= Aydin Mammadov =

Aydin Mammadov may refer to:

- Aydin Mammadov (historian)
- Aydin Mammadov (politician)
