= Asgarov =

Asgarov, Asgerov or Askerov (Azerbaijani: Əsgərov) is a Russianized Azerbaijani surname. "Askerov" may also be of other Turkic origin. They derive from the Turkic term "asker", 'soldier', which may also be a given name. Tts feminine counterparts are Asgarova, Asgerova or Askerova. Notable people with the surname include:

- Azad Asgarov (born 1971), Azerbaijani mixed martial artist
- Bahram Askerov (1933–2014), Azerbaijani physicist
- Dzhabar Askerov (born 1986), Russian kickboxer
- Elman Asgarov (born 1975), Azerbaijani freestyle wrestler
- Rafig Asgarov (born 1949), Commander of Azerbaijani Naval Forces
- Salatyn Asgarova (1961–1991), Azerbaijani journalist
- Shaig Asgarov (born 1966), Azerbaijan academic
- Shamil Asgarov (1929–2005), Kurdish scholar, poet, and researcher
- Toghrul Asgarov (born 1992), Azerbaijani wrestler
- Vugar Asgarov (born 1985), Azerbaijani football striker
- Ziyafat Asgarov (born 1963), Azerbaijani politician
