= Maleyka Abbaszadeh =

Azerbaijani politician (born 1953)

- Məleykə Abbaszadə

Rector of the Baku State University
- Incumbent
- Assumed office November 19, 2026
- President: Ilham Aliyev
- Preceded by: Elchin Babayev

Personal details
- Born: 1953 (age 72–73) Baku, Azerbaijan

Maleyka Mehdi qizi Abbaszadeh (Azerbaijani: Məleykə Abbaszadə, née Mustafayeva, born 1953, Baku) is an Azerbaijani academician. She has been the rector of the Baku State University since 2026, having previously served the Chair of the State Examination Center from 2016 to 2026, and its predecessor, the State Commission for Student Admissions, from 2000 to 2016.

== Career ==
Maleyka Abbaszadeh was born in Baku and attended Public School #189. In 1975, she graduated from Moscow State University majoring in calculus and cybernetics. She did an internship at the Azerbaijan National Academy of Sciences Institute of Cybernetics and, for the next two years, at the Institute of Calculus Mathematics of the USSR Academy of Sciences. In 1988, she defended her master's thesis in cybernetics at the Ukrainian Academy of Sciences Institute of Cybernetics. Until 1994, Abbaszadeh worked on a number of government and non-government projects in the field of education.

In 1994, she was appointed Deputy Chair of the State Students Admission Commission (SSAC), a newly established organisation in charge of the national entrance test for aspiring post-secondary students. In October 2000, she was appointed head of the said committee. As the Chair of the SSAC, Abbaszadeh was a vocal critic of the education policy under ex-Minister of Education Misir Mardanov, which, according to her, yielded lower examination scores among prospective students year after year. In 2012, she openly questioned the transparency of the Best School and Best Teacher award contest held by the Ministry of Education. In 2013, she accused the Ministry of reporting false numbers of students currently enrolled in secondary schools. Abbaszadeh also pointed out significant flaws and errors in the Ministry-approved textbooks.

According to opposition media, Abbaszadeh's towering criticism of Mardanov was in fact part of the behind-the-scenes campaign orchestrated by the Presidential Administration and aimed at removing Misir Mardanov from his position. Mardanov, one of the most controversial ministers, was replaced by Mikayil Jabbarov as the Education Minister on 19 April 2013 by a presidential decree.

== Personal life ==
Abbaszadeh was married to Ilgar Abbaszadeh but they later divorced. They have two daughters. Their daughter Nargiz Birk-Petersen was one of the three presenters of the Eurovision Song Contest 2012 held in Baku.
