= March 3 =

March 3 this year in various calendars
- Tuesday, 3 March 2026
Akan	Kurubene
Armenian	16 Areg 1475
Aztec	Tecuilhuitontli 12, 1 Xōchitl
Babylonian	13 Shabatu, 2336 SE
Balinese pawukon	Luang, Pepet, Pasah, Menala, Wage, Paniron, Anggara of Ugu, Uma, Nohan, Raja
Bengali	18 Falgun, BS 1432
Chinese	Yang Fire Rat・Wings Mansion; Fire Horse Year, Month 1, Day 15 (Yushui, 2 days until Jingzhe)
Common Era	3 March 2026 CE
Coptic	24 Meshir, AM 1742
Egyptian	21 Epiphi, 2774 NE
Ethiopian	24 Yakātit, 2018 Amätä Məhrät
French Republican	Décade II, Tridi de Ventôse de l'Année 234 de la République
Gregorian	3 March, AD 2026
Hebrew	14 Adar, AM 5786
Hindu	Maghā・Sukarman; Solar: 19 Phālguna, 1947 SE; Lunisolar: Pūrṇimā, Śukla pakṣa of Phālguna, 2082 VE; Rāudra・5126 KY・1,872,637
Icelandic	Þriðjudagur, 10 Góa 2025
Islamic	14 Ramadan, AH 1447 (using tabular method)
ISO week date	2026-W10-2
Japanese	15 Mutsuki, Reiwa 8 (Usui, 2 days until Keichitsu)
Julian	18 February, AD 2026 (AM 7534)
Julian day	2461103
Korean	15 Horangidal, 4359 DE
Maya	13.0.13.7.0; 18 Kayab, 1 Ahau
Roman	ante diem XII Kalendas Martias, MMDCCLXXIX AUC
Solar Hijri	12 Esfand, SH 1404
Tibetan	15 mchu, me pho rta 2153 or 1772 or 1000

<<	March					>>
Su	Mo	Tu	We	Th	Fr	Sa
1	2	3	4	5	6	7
8	9	10	11	12	13	14
15	16	17	18	19	20	21
22	23	24	25	26	27	28
29	30	31
2026

March 3 in recent years
2026 (Tuesday)
2025 (Monday)
2024 (Sunday)
2023 (Friday)
2022 (Thursday)
2021 (Wednesday)
2020 (Tuesday)
2019 (Sunday)
2018 (Saturday)
2017 (Friday)

March 3 is the 62nd day of the year (63rd in leap years) in the Gregorian calendar; 303 days remain until the end of the year.

== Events ==
=== Pre-1600 ===
- 473 – Gundobad (nephew of Ricimer) nominates Glycerius as emperor of the Western Roman Empire.
- 724 – Empress Genshō abdicates the throne in favor of her nephew Shōmu who becomes emperor of Japan.
- 880 – Emperor Basil I ratifies the decrees of the Fourth Council of Constantinople, confirming the reinstatement of patriarch Photios I of Constantinople.
- 1575 – Mughal Emperor Akbar defeats Sultan of Bengal Daud Khan Karrani's army at the Battle of Tukaroi.
- 1585 – The Olympic Theatre, designed by Andrea Palladio, is inaugurated in Vicenza.

=== 1601–1900 ===
- 1776 – American Revolutionary War: The first amphibious landing of the United States Marine Corps begins the Battle of Nassau.
- 1779 – American Revolutionary War: The Continental Army is routed at the Battle of Brier Creek near Savannah, Georgia.
- 1795 — The Fédon Rebellion breaks out in Grenada, the rebels seizing Grenville and later Gouyave.
- 1799 – The Russo-Ottoman siege of Corfu ends with the surrender of the French garrison.
- 1845 – Florida is admitted as the 27th U.S. state.
- 1849 – The Territory of Minnesota is created.
- 1857 – Second Opium War: France and the United Kingdom declare war on China.
- 1859 – The two-day Great Slave Auction, one of the largest such auctions in United States history, concludes.
- 1861 – Alexander II of Russia signs the Emancipation Manifesto, freeing serfs.
- 1873 – Censorship in the United States: The U.S. Congress enacts the Comstock Law, making it illegal to send any "obscene literature and articles of immoral use" through the mail.
- 1878 – The Russo-Turkish War ends with Bulgaria regaining its independence from the Ottoman Empire according to the Treaty of San Stefano.
- 1891 – Shoshone National Forest is established as the first national forest in the US and world.

=== 1901–present ===
- 1913 – Thousands of women march in the Woman Suffrage Procession in Washington, D.C.
- 1918 – Russia signs the Treaty of Brest-Litovsk, agreeing to withdraw from World War I, and conceding German control of the Baltic States, Belarus and Ukraine. It also conceded Turkish control of Ardahan, Kars and Batumi.
- 1923 – US magazine Time publishes its first issue.
- 1924 – The Ottoman Caliphate is abolished, when the Caliph Abdülmecid II of the Ottoman dynasty is deposed. The last remnant of the old monarchy gives way to the reformed Turkey of Kemal Atatürk.
- 1924 – The Free State of Fiume is annexed by the Kingdom of Italy.
- 1938 – Oil is discovered in Saudi Arabia.
- 1939 – In Bombay, Mohandas Gandhi begins a hunger strike in protest at the autocratic rule in British India.
- 1940 – Five people are killed in an arson attack on the offices of the communist newspaper Flamman in Luleå, Sweden.
- 1942 – World War II: Ten Japanese warplanes raid Broome, Western Australia, killing more than 100 people.
- 1943 – World War II: In London, 173 people are killed in a crush while trying to enter an air-raid shelter at Bethnal Green tube station.
- 1944 – The Order of Nakhimov and Order of Ushakov are instituted in USSR as the highest naval awards.
- 1944 – A freight train carrying stowaway passengers stalls in a tunnel shortly after departing from Balvano, Basilicata, Italy just after midnight, with 517 dying from carbon monoxide poisoning.
- 1945 – World War II: In poor visibility, the RAF mistakenly bombs the Bezuidenhout area of The Hague, Netherlands, killing 511 people.
- 1953 – A De Havilland Comet (Canadian Pacific Air Lines) crashes in Karachi, Pakistan, killing 11 people.
- 1958 – Nuri al-Said becomes Prime Minister of Iraq for the eighth time.
- 1969 – Apollo program: NASA launches Apollo 9 to test the lunar module.
- 1972 – Mohawk Airlines Flight 405 crashes as a result of a control malfunction and insufficient training in emergency procedures.
- 1974 – Turkish Airlines Flight 981 crashes at Ermenonville near Paris, France killing all 346 aboard.
- 1980 – The USS Nautilus is decommissioned and stricken from the Naval Vessel Register.
- 1985 – A magnitude 8.3 earthquake strikes the Valparaíso Region of Chile, killing 177 and leaving nearly a million people homeless.
- 1986 – The Australia Act 1986 commences, causing Australia to become fully independent from the United Kingdom.
- 1991 – An amateur video captures the beating of Rodney King by Los Angeles police officers.
- 1991 – United Airlines Flight 585 crashes on its final approach to Colorado Springs killing everyone on board.
- 2005 – James Roszko murders four Royal Canadian Mounted Police constables during a drug bust at his property in Rochfort Bridge, Alberta, then commits suicide. This is the deadliest peace-time incident for the RCMP since 1885 and the North-West Rebellion.
- 2005 – Steve Fossett becomes the first person to fly an airplane non-stop around the world solo without refueling.
- 2005 – Margaret Wilson is elected as Speaker of the New Zealand House of Representatives, beginning a period lasting until August 23, 2006, where all the highest political offices (including Elizabeth II as Head of State), were occupied by women, making New Zealand the first country for this to occur.
- 2013 – A bomb blast in Karachi, Pakistan, kills at least 48 people and injured 200 others in a predominantly Shia Muslim area.

== Births ==
=== Pre-1600 ===
- 1455 – John II of Portugal (died 1495)
- 1455 – Ascanio Sforza, Catholic cardinal (died 1505)
- 1506 – Luís of Portugal, Duke of Beja (died 1555)
- 1520 – Matthias Flacius, Croatian theologian and reformer (died 1575)
- 1583 – Edward Herbert, 1st Baron Herbert of Cherbury, English-Welsh soldier, historian, and diplomat (died 1648)
- 1589 – Gisbertus Voetius, Dutch minister, theologian, and academic (died 1676)

=== 1601–1900 ===
- 1606 – Edmund Waller, English poet and politician (died 1687)
- 1652 – Thomas Otway, English playwright and author (died 1685)
- 1678 – Madeleine de Verchères, Canadian rebel leader (died 1747)
- 1756 – William Godwin, English journalist and author (died 1836)
- 1778 – Frederica of Mecklenburg-Strelitz (died 1841)
- 1793 – William Macready, English actor and manager (died 1873)
- 1800 – Heinrich Georg Bronn, German geologist and paleontologist (died 1862)
- 1803 – Thomas Field Gibson, English manufacturer who aided the welfare of the Spitalfields silk weavers (died 1889)
- 1805 – Jonas Furrer, Swiss politician (died 1861)
- 1816 – William James Blacklock, English-Scottish painter (died 1858)
- 1819 – Gustave de Molinari, Dutch-Belgian economist and theorist (died 1912)
- 1825 – Shiranui Kōemon, Japanese sumo wrestler (died 1879)
- 1831 – George Pullman, American engineer and businessman, founded the Pullman Company (died 1897)
- 1839 – Jamsetji Tata, Indian businessman, founded Tata Group (died 1904)
- 1841 – John Murray, Canadian-Scottish oceanographer and biologist (died 1914)
- 1845 – Georg Cantor, Russian-German mathematician and philosopher (died 1918)
- 1847 – Alexander Graham Bell, Scottish-American engineer and academic, invented the telephone (died 1922)
- 1860 – John Montgomery Ward, American baseball player and manager (died 1925)
- 1863 – Arthur Machen, Welsh author and mystic (died 1947)
- 1866 – Fred A. Busse, American lawyer and politician, 39th Mayor of Chicago (died 1914)
- 1868 – Émile Chartier, French philosopher and journalist (died 1951)
- 1869 – Henry Wood, English conductor (died 1944)
- 1871 – Maurice Garin, Italian-French cyclist (died 1957)
- 1872 – Frida Felser, German opera singer and actress (died 1941)
- 1873 – William Green, American union leader and politician (died 1952)
- 1880 – Yōsuke Matsuoka, Japanese politician, Japanese Minister of Foreign Affairs (died 1946)
- 1882 – Elisabeth Abegg, German anti-Nazi resistance fighter (died 1974)
- 1882 – Charles Ponzi, Italian businessman and convicted con man (died 1949)
- 1883 – Paul Marais de Beauchamp, French zoologist (died 1977)
- 1891 – Damaskinos of Athens, Greek archbishop (died 1949)
- 1893 – Beatrice Wood, American illustrator and potter (died 1998)
- 1895 – Ragnar Frisch, Norwegian economist and academic, Nobel Prize laureate (died 1973)
- 1898 – Emil Artin, Austrian-German mathematician and academic (died 1962)
- 1900 – Edna Best, British stage and film actress (died 1974)

=== 1901–present ===
- 1902 – Ruby Dandridge, African-American film and radio actress (died 1987)
- 1903 – Vasily Kozlov, Belarusian general and politician (died 1967)
- 1911 – Jean Harlow, American actress (died 1937)
- 1911 – Hugues Lapointe, Canadian lawyer and politician, 22nd Lieutenant Governor of Quebec (died 1982)
- 1913 – Margaret Bonds, American pianist and composer (died 1972)
- 1913 – Harold J. Stone, American actor (died 2005)
- 1914 – Asger Jorn, Danish painter and sculptor (died 1973)
- 1916 – Paul Halmos, Hungarian-American mathematician (died 2006)
- 1917 – Sameera Moussa, Egyptian physicist and academic (died 1952)
- 1918 – Arthur Kornberg, American biochemist and academic, Nobel Prize laureate (died 2007)
- 1920 – Julius Boros, American golfer and accountant (died 1994)
- 1920 – James Doohan, Canadian-American actor and soldier (died 2005)
- 1920 – Ronald Searle, English-French soldier and illustrator (died 2011)
- 1921 – Diana Barrymore, American actress (died 1960)
- 1922 – Nándor Hidegkuti, Hungarian footballer and manager (died 2002)
- 1923 – Tamara Lisitsian, Soviet film director and screenwriter (died 2009)
- 1923 – Barney Martin, American police officer and actor (died 2005)
- 1923 – Doc Watson, American bluegrass singer-songwriter and musician (died 2012)
- 1924 – Tomiichi Murayama, Japanese soldier and politician, 52nd Prime Minister of Japan (died 2025)
- 1926 – James Merrill, American poet and playwright (died 1995)
- 1927 – Pierre Aubert, Swiss lawyer and politician (died 2016)
- 1930 – Ion Iliescu, Romanian engineer and politician, 2nd President of Romania (died 2025)
- 1932 – Roy Fisher, Australian rugby league player
- 1933 – Lee Radziwill, American socialite, sister of Jacqueline Kennedy Onassis (died 2019)
- 1934 – Peter Brooke, Baron Brooke of Sutton Mandeville, English politician, Secretary of State for Northern Ireland (died 2023)
- 1934 – Jimmy Garrison, American bassist and educator (died 1976)
- 1935 – Mal Anderson, Australian tennis player (died 2026)
- 1935 – Michael Walzer, American philosopher and academic
- 1935 – Zhelyu Zhelev, Bulgarian philosopher and politician, 2nd President of Bulgaria (died 2015)
- 1939 – Larry Burkett, American author and radio host (died 2003)
- 1939 – M. L. Jaisimha, Indian cricketer (died 1999)
- 1940 – Germán Castro Caycedo, Colombian author and journalist (died 2021)
- 1940 – Perry Ellis, American fashion designer, founded Perry Ellis (died 1986)
- 1940 – Jean-Paul Proust, French-Monégasque police officer and politician, 21st Minister of State of Monaco (died 2010)
- 1941 – Novella Jafaroghlu, Azerbaijani chemist and politician
- 1941 – Mike Pender, English singer-songwriter and guitarist
- 1945 – George Miller, Australian director, producer, and screenwriter
- 1945 – Hattie Winston, American actress
- 1947 – Clifton Snider, American author, poet, and critic (died 2021)
- 1947 – Jennifer Warnes, American singer-songwriter and producer
- 1947 – Willie Wise, American basketball player
- 1948 – Steve Wilhite, American computer scientist, developer of the GIF image format at CompuServe in 1987 (died 2022)
- 1949 – Ron Chernow, American historian, journalist, and author
- 1949 – Bonnie J. Dunbar, American engineer, academic, and astronaut
- 1949 – Jesse Jefferson, American baseball player (died 2011)
- 1950 – Kamal Ahmed Majumder, Bangladeshi politician
- 1951 – Lindsay Cooper, English composer, bassoon and oboe player (died 2013)
- 1951 – Andy Murray, Canadian ice hockey player and coach
- 1951 – Heizō Takenaka, Japanese economist and politician
- 1952 – Rudy Fernandez, Filipino actor and producer (died 2008)
- 1953 – Robyn Hitchcock, English singer-songwriter and guitarist
- 1953 – Zico, Brazilian footballer and coach
- 1954 – Keith Fergus, American golfer
- 1954 – Robert Gossett, American actor
- 1954 – John Lilley, American singer-songwriter and guitarist
- 1954 – Édouard Lock, Moroccan-Canadian dancer and choreographer
- 1955 – Michele Singer Reiner, American film producer (died 2025)
- 1955 – John Ribot, Australian rugby league player and administrator
- 1955 – Darnell Williams, English-American actor and director
- 1956 – Zbigniew Boniek, Polish footballer and manager
- 1956 – John Fulton Reid, New Zealand cricketer (died 2020)
- 1957 – Stephen Budiansky, American historian, journalist, and author
- 1957 – Thom Hoffman, Dutch actor and photographer
- 1958 – Johnny Moore, American basketball player and coach
- 1958 – Miranda Richardson, English actress
- 1959 – Ira Glass, American radio host and producer
- 1959 – Duško Vujošević, Montenegrin basketball player and coach (died 2026)
- 1961 – Mary Page Keller, American actress and producer
- 1961 – John Matteson, American biographer
- 1961 – Fatima Whitbread, English javelin thrower
- 1962 – Jackie Joyner-Kersee, American heptathlete and long jumper
- 1962 – Herschel Walker, American football player, mixed martial artist, and activist
- 1963 – Khaltmaagiin Battulga, Mongolian politician and wrestler, 5th President of Mongolia
- 1963 – Martín Fiz, Spanish runner
- 1964 – Raúl Alcalá, Mexican cyclist
- 1964 – Laura Harring, Mexican-American model and actress, Miss USA 1985
- 1964 – Glenn Kulka, Canadian ice hockey player and wrestler
- 1965 – Dragan Stojković, Serbian footballer and manager
- 1966 – Tone Lōc, American rapper, producer, and actor
- 1966 – Timo Tolkki, Finnish guitarist, songwriter, and producer
- 1968 – Brian Cox, English keyboard player and physicist
- 1968 – Brian Leetch, American ice hockey player
- 1970 – Julie Bowen, American actress
- 1970 – Inzamam-ul-Haq, Pakistani cricketer and coach
- 1971 – Charlie Brooker, English journalist, producer, and author
- 1971 – Tyler Florence, American chef and author
- 1972 – Darren Anderton, English footballer and sportscaster
- 1972 – Martin Procházka, Czech ice hockey player
- 1973 – Xavier Bettel, Luxembourger lawyer and politician, Prime Minister of Luxembourg
- 1974 – David Faustino, American actor
- 1975 – Patric Chiha, Austrian film director and screenwriter
- 1976 – Kampamba Mulenga, Zambian politician
- 1976 – Fraser Gehrig, Australian footballer
- 1976 – Isabel Granada, Filipino-Spanish actress (died 2017)
- 1976 – Keit Pentus-Rosimannus, Estonian politician, 28th Estonian Minister of Foreign Affairs
- 1977 – Ronan Keating, Irish singer-songwriter and actor
- 1977 – Buddy Valastro, American chef and television host
- 1979 – Albert Jorquera, Spanish footballer
- 1979 – Patrick Renna, American actor and film producer
- 1980 – Katherine Waterston, English-American actress
- 1981 – Lil' Flip, American rapper, songwriter, and producer
- 1981 – Julius Malema, South African politician
- 1981 – Emmanuel Pappoe, Ghanaian footballer
- 1981 – Tobias Forge, Swedish singer and songwriter
- 1982 – Jessica Biel, American actress, singer, and producer
- 1982 – Tolu Ogunlesi, Nigerian journalist and writer
- 1982 – Colton Orr, Canadian ice hockey player
- 1982 – Brent Tate, Australian rugby league player and sportscaster
- 1983 – Ashley Hansen, Australian footballer
- 1983 – Sarah Poewe, South African swimmer
- 1984 – Valerio Bernabò, Italian rugby player
- 1984 – Santonio Holmes, American football player
- 1984 – Ivar, American wrestler
- 1984 – Alexander Semin, Russian ice hockey player
- 1985 – Toby Turner, American Internet personality
- 1986 – Jed Collins, American football player
- 1986 – Stacie Orrico, American singer-songwriter
- 1986 – Mehmet Topal, Turkish footballer
- 1987 – Shraddha Kapoor, Indian actress, singer, and designer
- 1987 – Jesús Padilla, Mexican footballer
- 1987 – Andrei Zubarev, Russian ice hockey player
- 1988 – Teodora Mirčić, Serbian tennis player
- 1988 – Michael Morrison, English footballer
- 1988 – Jan-Arie van der Heijden, Dutch footballer
- 1988 – Max Waller, English cricketer
- 1989 – Erwin Mulder, Dutch footballer
- 1990 – Vlado Janković, Greek-Serbian basketball player
- 1991 – Park Cho-rong, South Korean singer-songwriter and actress
- 1991 – Anri Sakaguchi, Japanese actress
- 1993 – Gabriela Cé, Brazilian tennis player
- 1993 – Josef Dostál, Czech kayaker
- 1993 – Antonio Rüdiger, German footballer
- 1993 – Michael Thomas, American football player
- 1994 – Dilson Herrera, Colombian baseball player
- 1994 – Umika Kawashima, Japanese singer and actress
- 1995 – Bryan Cristante, Italian footballer
- 1995 – Maine Mendoza, Filipina actress
- 1996 – Cameron Johnson, American basketball player
- 1996 – Andile Phehlukwayo, South African cricketer
- 1997 – Camila Cabello, Cuban-American singer-songwriter and actress
- 1997 – David Neres, Brazilian footballer
- 1997 – Momoka Muraoka, Japanese para alpine skier
- 1998 – Jayson Tatum, American basketball player
- 1999 – Corey Kispert, American basketball player
- 2000 – Jevon Holland, Canadian-American football player
- 2001 – Jvke, American singer-songwriter

== Deaths ==
=== Pre-1600 ===
- 532 – Winwaloe, founder of Landévennec Abbey (born c. 460)
- 1009 – Abd al-Rahman Sanchuelo, Umayyad chief minister (born 983)
- 1195 – Hugh de Puiset, bishop of Durham (born c. 1125)
- 1239 – Vladimir IV Rurikovich, Grand Prince of Kiev (born 1187)
- 1311 – Antony Bek, bishop of Durham
- 1323 – Andrew Harclay, 1st Earl of Carlisle, English military leader
- 1383 – Hugh III, Italian nobleman
- 1459 – Ausiàs March, Catalan knight and poet (born 1397)
- 1542 – Arthur Plantagenet, 1st Viscount Lisle, illegitimate son of Edward IV
- 1554 – John Frederick I, Elector of Saxony (born 1503)
- 1578 – Sebastiano Venier, doge of Venice (born 1496)
- 1578 – Michael Kantakouzenos Şeytanoğlu, Ottoman Greek magnate
- 1588 – Henry XI, duke of Legnica (born 1539)
- 1592 – Michael Coxcie, Flemish painter (born 1499)

=== 1601–1900 ===
- 1611 – William Douglas, 10th Earl of Angus, Scottish nobleman (born 1552)
- 1616 – Matthias de l'Obel, Flemish physician and botanist (born 1538)
- 1700 – Chhatrapati Rajaram, 3rd Chhatrapati of Maratha Empire (born 1670)
- 1703 – Robert Hooke, English architect and philosopher (born 1635)
- 1744 – Jean Barbeyrac, French scholar and jurist (born 1674)
- 1765 – William Stukeley, English archaeologist and historian (born 1687)
- 1768 – Nicola Porpora, Italian composer and educator (born 1686)
- 1789 – Ghulam Kadir, leader of the Afghan Rohilla
- 1792 – Robert Adam, Scottish-English architect and politician, designed the Culzean Castle (born 1728)
- 1850 – Oliver Cowdery, American religious leader (born 1806)
- 1894 – Ned Williamson, American baseball player (born 1857)

=== 1901–present ===
- 1901 – George Gilman, American businessman, founded The Great Atlantic & Pacific Tea Company (born 1826)
- 1905 – Antonio Annetto Caruana, Maltese archaeologist and author (born 1830)
- 1927 – Mikhail Artsybashev, Ukrainian author and playwright (born 1878)
- 1927 – J. G. Parry-Thomas, Welsh race car driver and engineer (born 1884)
- 1929 – Katharine Wright, American educator (born 1874)
- 1932 – Eugen d'Albert, Scottish-German pianist and composer (born 1864)
- 1943 – George Thompson, English cricketer and umpire (born 1877)
- 1949 – Katherine Sleeper Walden, American environmental activist (born 1862)
- 1959 – Lou Costello, American actor and comedian (born 1906)
- 1961 – Azizul Haq, Bengali Islamic scholar (born 1903)
- 1961 – Paul Wittgenstein, Austrian-American pianist (born 1887)
- 1966 – Joseph Fields, American playwright, director, and producer (born 1895)
- 1966 – William Frawley, American actor and vaudevillian (born 1887)
- 1966 – Alice Pearce, American actress (born 1917)
- 1981 – Rebecca Lancefield, American microbiologist and researcher (born 1895)
- 1982 – Firaq Gorakhpuri, Indian poet and critic (born 1896)
- 1982 – Georges Perec, French author and screenwriter (born 1936)
- 1983 – Hergé, Belgian author and illustrator (born 1907)
- 1987 – Danny Kaye, American actor, singer, and dancer (born 1911)
- 1988 – Henryk Szeryng, Polish-Mexican violinist and composer (born 1918)
- 1988 – Sewall Wright, American biologist and geneticist (born 1889)
- 1990 – Charlotte Moore Sitterly, American astronomer (born 1898)
- 1991 – Arthur Murray, American dancer and educator (born 1895)
- 1991 – William Penney, Baron Penney, Gibraltar-born English mathematician, physicist, and academic (born 1909)
- 1993 – Mel Bradford, American author and critic (born 1934)
- 1993 – Carlos Marcello, Tunisian-American mob boss (born 1910)
- 1993 – Carlos Montoya, Spanish guitarist and composer (born 1903)
- 1993 – Albert Sabin, Polish-American physician and virologist (born 1906)
- 1994 – John Edward Williams, American author and academic (born 1922)
- 1995 – Howard W. Hunter, American religious leader, 14th President of The Church of Jesus Christ of Latter-day Saints (born 1907)
- 1996 – Marguerite Duras, French author and director (born 1914)
- 1996 – John Krol, American cardinal (born 1910)
- 1998 – Fred W. Friendly, American journalist and broadcaster (born 1915)
- 1999 – Gerhard Herzberg, German-Canadian chemist and astronomer, Nobel Prize laureate (born 1904)
- 1999 – Lee Philips, American actor and director (born 1927)
- 2000 – Toni Ortelli, Italian composer and conductor (born 1904)
- 2001 – Louis Edmonds, American actor (born 1923)
- 2001 – Maija Isola, Finnish textile designer (born 1927)
- 2001 – Eugene Sledge, American soldier, author, and academic (born 1923)
- 2002 – G. M. C. Balayogi, Indian lawyer and politician, 12th Speaker of the Lok Sabha (born 1951)
- 2003 – Horst Buchholz, German actor (born 1933)
- 2003 – Luis Marden, American linguist, photographer, and explorer (born 1913)
- 2003 – Goffredo Petrassi, Italian composer and conductor (born 1904)
- 2005 – Max Fisher, American businessman and philanthropist (born 1928)
- 2006 – Ivor Cutler, Scottish poet and songwriter (born 1923)
- 2006 – Else Fisher, Australian-Swedish dancer, choreographer, and director (born 1918)
- 2006 – William Herskovic, Hungarian-American humanitarian (born 1914)
- 2007 – Osvaldo Cavandoli, Italian cartoonist (born 1920)
- 2008 – Giuseppe Di Stefano, Italian tenor and actor (born 1921)
- 2008 – Norman Smith, English drummer and producer (born 1923)
- 2009 – Gilbert Parent, Canadian educator and politician, 33rd Speaker of the House of Commons of Canada (born 1935)
- 2010 – Keith Alexander, English footballer and manager (born 1956)
- 2010 – Michael Foot, English journalist and politician, Secretary of State for Employment (born 1913)
- 2011 – May Cutler, Canadian journalist, author, and politician (born 1923)
- 2012 – Ralph McQuarrie, American conceptual designer and illustrator (born 1929)
- 2012 – Ronnie Montrose, American guitarist, songwriter, and producer (born 1947)
- 2012 – Alex Webster, American football player and coach (born 1931)
- 2013 – Luis Cubilla, Uruguayan footballer and manager (born 1940)
- 2013 – James Strong, Qantas CEO from 1993 to 2001 (born 1944)
- 2015 – Ernest Braun, Austrian-English physicist and academic (born 1925)
- 2015 – M. Stanton Evans, American journalist and author (born 1934)
- 2016 – Hayabusa, Japanese wrestler (born 1968)
- 2016 – Berta Cáceres, Honduran environmentalist (born 1973)
- 2016 – Martin Crowe, New Zealand cricketer and sportscaster (born 1962)
- 2016 – Thanat Khoman, Thai politician and diplomat, Deputy Prime Minister of Thailand (born 1914)
- 2016 – Sarah Tait, Australian Olympic rower (born 1983)
- 2017 – René Préval, Haitian politician (born 1943)
- 2018 – Roger Bannister, English middle-distance athlete, first man to run a four-minute mile (born 1929)
- 2018 – Mal Bryce, Australian politician (born 1943)
- 2018 – Vanessa Goodwin, Australian politician (born 1969)
- 2018 – David Ogden Stiers, American actor, voice actor and musician (born 1942)
- 2019 – Peter Hurford OBE, British organist and composer (born 1930)
- 2020 – Charles J. Urstadt, American real estate executive and investor (born 1928)
- 2023 – Kenzaburō Ōe, Japanese novelist, 1994 Nobel Prize laureate in Literature (born 1935)
- 2023 – Tom Sizemore, American actor (born 1961)

== Holidays and observances ==
- Christian feast day:
  - Anselm, Duke of Friuli
  - Arthelais
  - Cunigunde of Luxembourg
  - Katharine Drexel
  - John and Charles Wesley (Episcopal Church (USA))
  - Marinus and Asterius of Caesarea
  - Winwaloe
  - March 3 (Eastern Orthodox liturgics)
- Hinamatsuri or "Girl's Day" (Japan)
- Liberation and Freedom Day (Charlottesville, Virginia, USA)
- Liberation Day (Bulgaria)
- Martyrs' Day (Malawi)
- Mother's Day (Georgia)
- Sportsmen's Day (Egypt)
- World Hearing Day
- World Wildlife Day
