= Magsud Mammadov =

Magsud Mammadov may refer to:

- Magsud Mammadov (dancer) (1929–2026), Soviet and Azerbaijani ballet dancer
- Magsud Mammadov (politician) (1897–1938), Azerbaijani politician
