= Solar myths =

Myths dealing with the sun

Ra — sun god, supreme deity in Ancient Egyptian religion

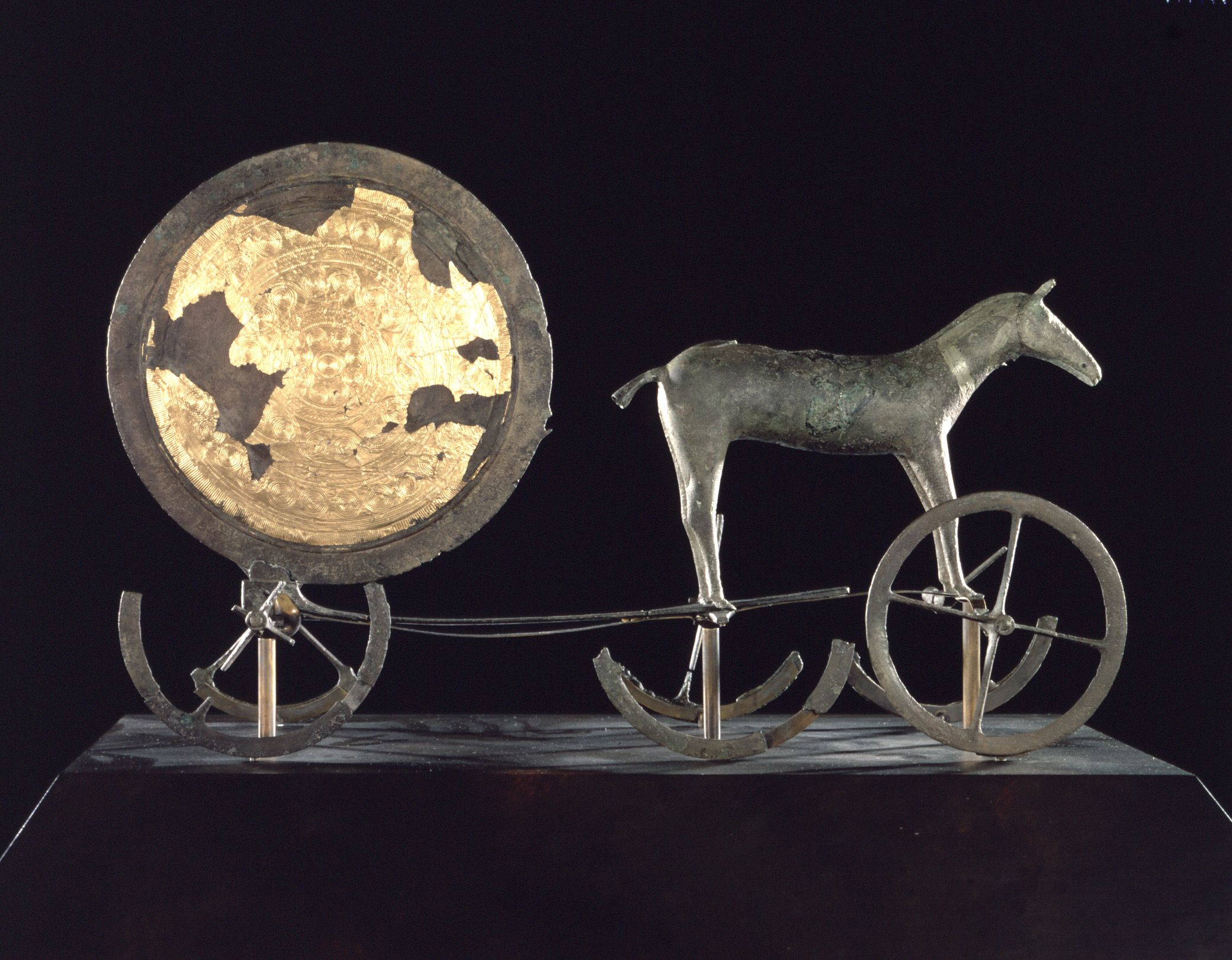
Sun chariot in Trundholm

Solar myth (Latin: solaris «solar») — mythologization of the Sun and its impact on earthly life; usually closely associated with lunar myths.

== Development ==
Contrary to the assumptions of ethnographers of the 19th and early 20th centuries, in the "primitive", archaic religious and mythological systems, a particularly revered "cult of the Sun" is not observed. In them, the Sun is perceived as a minor character or even an inanimate object. Among the archaic solar myths are myths about the emergence of the Sun and the destruction of superfluous suns, about the disappearance and return of the Sun, common among African, Siberian, and Australian peoples. As Vyacheslav Ivanov suggests, twin myths about the Sun and the Moon and the motif of the “heavenly wedding” also seem archaic. In the most ancient versions (in particular, among the Siberian peoples), the Sun in this pair represents a woman, and the Moon represents a man.

According to the ethnographer Arthur Hocart, the cult of the Sun comes to the fore in cultures where the role of the "sacred king" is increasing. In Sumerian-Akkadian mythology, the sun god Shamash is still inferior in importance to the moon god, but is already becoming one of the most revered deities. Solar cults play an important role in ancient Egyptian religion. Among the Egyptian solar deities are Ra, Horus, Amun, Atum, Khepri - the scarab god, rolling the Sun across the sky. In the 14th century BC Pharaoh Akhenaten attempts a radical religious reform and introduces a single cult of the Aten in Egypt (originally the personification of the solar disk).

== Historical ==
Solar cults occupy an important place in Indo-European mythology, where they are associated with the cult of the horse and the image of the divine twins (Ashvins, Dioscuri). According to Indo-European ideas, the Sun “travels” (or “carries”) across the sky on a horse-drawn cart, passing through the sky in a day. Examples of Indo-European solar deities are the ancient Indian Surya, the Greek Apollo and Helios, the Roman Sol. Solar origin has one of the main deities of late Zoroastrianism - Mitra.

Various researchers associate the Slavic gods Dazhbog, Khors with the cult of the Sun; the lack of information on Slavic pre-Christian mythology does not allow us to unambiguously confirm or refute these constructions.

Developed solar cults existed in South and Mesoamerica (Huitzilopochtli, Inti).

The supreme deity in the Japanese pantheon of Shinto is the sun goddess Amaterasu.

Azerbaijani historian Aydin Mammadov writes that in the pre-Islamic spiritual culture of the Azerbaijani people, beliefs and rituals associated with the cult of the Sun occupy a special place. The cult of the Sun arose in ancient times as a result of the natural human need for sunlight and warmth and is firmly rooted in the minds of people, in their mythologized thinking. In Azerbaijan, the cult of the daylight experienced its heyday in the Bronze Age. According to many researchers, dolmens and cromlechs known in Azerbaijan are also associated with the cult of the Sun.

== Interpretation ==
Ethnographers of the mythological school of the 18-19th centuries gave exaggerated significance to solar myths, declaring various cult heroes and mythological characters as personifications of the Sun, who in fact have no real connections with it. These exaggerations in their turn prompted parodic essays, which ostensibly demonstrated that figures such as Napoleon Bonaparte and Max Müller were solar myths.

== See also ==
- Solar deity

== Literature ==
- Солярные мифы / Иванов В. В. // Мифы народов мира : Энцикл. в 2 т. / гл. ред. С. А. Токарев. — 2-е изд. — М. : Советская энциклопедия, 1988. — Т. 2 : К—Я. — 719 с.
- Элиаде, М. Солнце и поклонение Солнцу // Избранные сочинения : Очерки сравнительного религиоведения : моногр. / Пер. с англ.. — М. : Ладомир, 1999. — С. 127–153. — 488 с. — 2200 экз. — ISBN 5-86218-346-9.
- Олкотт, У. Т. Мифы о солнце / Пер. с англ.. — М. : Центрполиграф, 2013. — 218 с. — ISBN 978-5-9524-5070-7.
- Мамедов, А. Б. Культ Солнца в древней системе верований азербайджанцев : арх. 23 ноября 2018 // İrs-Наследие : журн. — 2017. — № 5 (89). — С. 32–37.
