= Mammad Yaqubov =

Azerbaijani scientist

Mammad Hagverdi Yaqubov (Məmməd Haqverdi oğlu Yaqubov) is an Azerbaijani scientist and professor, Doctor of Physical and Mathematical Sciences.

Mammad Hagverdi Yaqubov was born on February 2, 1941, in the village of Mils, Julfa region of the Nakhchivan Autonomous Republic. In 1962, he graduated from the Faculty of Mechanics and Mathematics at Baku State University. Since 1965, he has been working at Baku State University.

In 1966, he defended his Candidate of Science thesis, entitled "The Continuation and Stability of a Class of Integro-Differential Equations", in Physical and Mathematical Sciences. In 1992, he defended his doctoral dissertation and was awarded the degree of Doctor of Physical and Mathematical Sciences for his work entitled "Optimal Sliding Regimes in Systems with Distributed Parameters and Necessary Conditions for Optimality".

Since 1996, Yaqubov has been the Head of the Department of Mathematical Methods of Control Theory at the Faculty of Mechanics and Mathematics of Baku State University.

He has participated in numerous international seminars, symposiums and conferences. For his contributions to the development of science in Azerbaijan, by the decree of the President of the Republic of Azerbaijan, he was awarded the Order of Glory (Şöhrət ordeni) on October 30, 2009.

Mammad Hagverdi Yaqubov was awarded the diploma "The Best Patriotic Researcher" in 2014 by the European Publishing Press House.

He is the author of more than 100 scientific publications.

== Works ==
Books and monographs:

1. Ordinary Differential Equations course. Manual for high schools. "Education" publishing house. Baku, 1978. (Q.Ehmedov, KHəsənov)

2. Mathematics for classes V dərsliyi secondary schools of Baku, Çaşıoğlu, 2007

3. Mathematics for classes VI dərsliyi secondary schools of Baku, Çaşıoğlu, 2007

4. Algebra manual for classes VII secondary schools of Baku, Çaşıoğlu, 2007

5. Algebra manual for classes VIII secondary schools of Baku, Çaşıoğlu, 2007

6. Algebra manual for classes IX secondary schools of Baku, Çaşıoğlu, 2007

7. Algebra and beginning in the analysis manual for classes X secondary schools of Baku, Çaşıoğlu, 2007

8. Algebra and beginning in the analysis for classes XI secondary schools of Baku, Çaşıoğlu, 2007

9. Ordinary differential equations. Baku, Maarif, 1978, 444 p.

10. A tidy ordinary differential equations. – Baku, 1999, 161 p.

11. Maximum and minimum problems-Baku, Çaşıoğlu, 1999, 84 p.

12. Mathematics. – Baku, Entrant, 2006, 2007, 2008, 840 p.

13. Mathematics. İssue and Examples-Baku, Çaşıoğlu, 2008, 543 p.

14. V-VI Olympic Exercises. – Baku, Kismet, 2008, 115 p.

15. Mathematics. Issue and examples. Baku, "Chashioglu" Publishing House, 2009. 542 p.

16. V-XI classes of secondary school mathematics teaching material for thematic work plan and review writing samples. Baku, "AM 965" LLC Publishing House, 2009. 196 p.

17. Secondary schools mathematics teaching material for the class X thematic work plan and review writing samples. Baku, MBM Publishing House, 2009. 39 p.

18. Mathematics. Translation from Azerbaijani language, "Abiturient" Baku, 2010. 890 p.

19. V-XI classes of secondary school mathematics teaching material for thematic work plan and review writing samples. "AM 965" MMC publishing house, Baku, 2010. 184 p.

Main articles:

1. Some integral inequalities, Izv.ANU Uz.SSR Ser. fiz.mat.nauk 1972, number 1, str.16–22

2. The solution of the boundary-value differential problems. equation with a parameter methods o.f.p.- Dokl. Academy of Sciences of Azerbaijan SSR 1973, number 9

3. The necessary optimality conditions for a class of control systems with distributed parametrami.- Izv.AN.Az.SSR, ser.fiz.tehn.i mat. Sciences, 1974, № 2

4. On the optimal control problem for elliptic equations, Izv. Universities. Mat. 1975, number 7, p. 92–98

5. Approximate solution of nonlinear integral equation with a parameter via soche-Tania methods kvazilinearizaatsii and o.f.p.- Dokl.AN Azerbaijan SSR 1975, number 4, p. 3–7

6. Properties of solutions of differential inclusions and their applications in the optimal upravlenii.- Izv.AN Azerbaijani SSR, ser.fiz.teh. and mate. Science 1982, number 5, p. 137–143

7. Optimal sliding modes of elliptic type Dokl.AN USSR, 1984, t.274, number 5

8. Optimal sliding mode in systems described by the equations of elliptic type Izv.AN Azerbaijani SSR, ser.fiz.mat.nauk 1984, number 3. p. 124–129

9. On the extension of the control problem and the theorem of existence of an optimal control by nonlinear elliptic uravneniyami.-Dokl.AN USSR, 1986, t.286, № 6. 1316–1319

10. On the sliding modes in a single system with distributed parameters. IMM -Trudy the Azerbaijan Academy of Sciences. 1998, t.VIII, / XVI / .210–215

11. Necessary conditions for optimality in a problem described by equation variable tipa.- Azərbaycan EA-nın xəbərləri, IV fizika-riyaziyyat və texniki elmlər seriyası, c.HHIV №3, 2004, p. 50–53

12. Some of the necessary conditions for optimality for systems with impulse vozdeystviyami.- Əməkdar elm xadimi, akademik Ə.İ.Hüseynovun 100 illik yubleyinə həsr olunmuş elmi konfransın tezisləri. Baku, 2007, p. 168

13. Gradient of the functional in a control problem in processes described by partial differential equation of third order, tezis. Modern problems of applied mathematics and information technologies – Al Khorezmiy 2009, Tashkent, September 18–21, 2009. p. 132

14. Gradient of the functional in a control problem in processes described by partial differential equation of third order.məqalə Transactions of the international scientific conference "Modern problems of aprlted mathe-matics and information technologies-Al Khorezmiy 2009", Tashkent, September 18–21, 2009. p. 38–40.

15. On the relationship between the sets of decisions and convexified main tasks in a problem upravleniya.Bakı, AMEA-nın məruzələri, T.LXV, c.3, 2010. p. 3 -7.

16. On the relationship between the solution sets the basic and advanced tasks for managing tasks in elliptic equations. International Scientific and Technical Journal "Problems of control and informatics", №4, Kyiv, 2010, 43–52.

17. Elliptic equation slippery regime described in the management of properties. Students, undergraduates, graduate students and young researchers, "Actual problems of mathematics and mechanics", a traditional conference, Baku, 2010. p. 53–55.

18. On the issue of the management of elliptic equation, which describes the presence of optimal control. Students, undergraduates, graduate students and young researchers, "Actual problems of mathematics and mechanics", a traditional conference, Baku, 2010. p. 55–56.

19. On the sliding regimes in the processes, described by the third order nonlinear equation. The Third International Conference Problems of Cuber-netcs and Informatics, Baku, september 6–8, 2010. p. 101–102.
