= Elchin Babayev =

Azerbaijani scientist

- Elçin Babayev
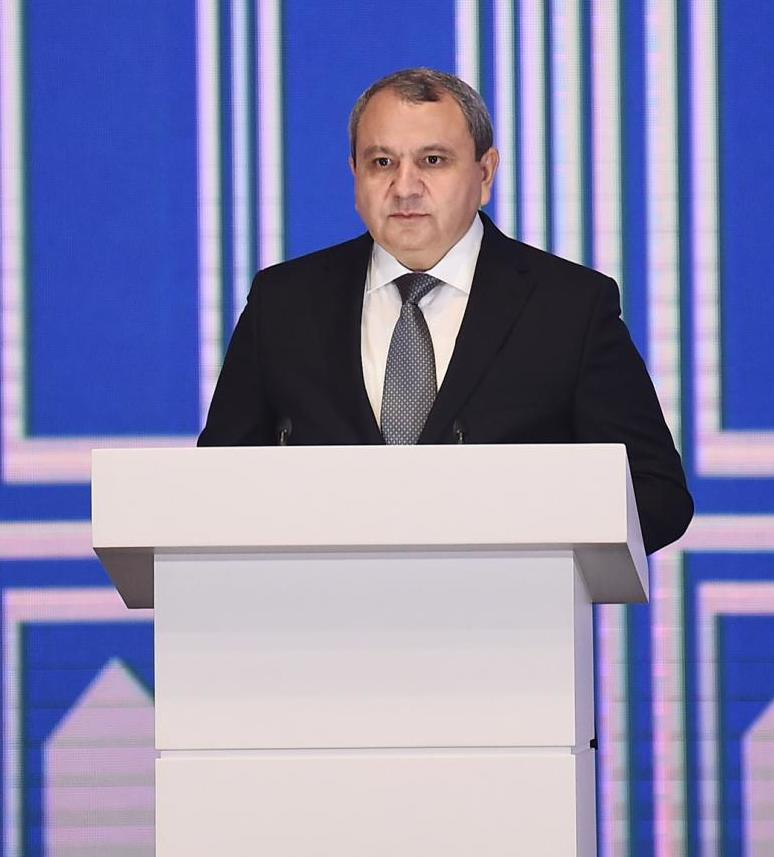
- Born: 4 April 1965 (age 61); Nakhchivan, Azerbaijan SSR, Soviet Union
- Citizenship: Azerbaijan
- Awards: Baku State University 100th anniversary medal
- Scientific career
- Fields: Astrophysics
- Workplaces: Baku State University

Elchin Safarali oglu Babayev (Azerbaijani: Elçin Səfəralı oğlu Babayev; born April 4, 1965, in Nakhchivan) is an Azerbaijani scientist, Doctor of Philosophy in physical and mathematical Sciences, associate professor. Rector of Baku State University (March 11, 2019 - November 19 2026)

== Biography ==
Babayev was born on April 4, 1965, in the city of Nakhichivan.

For some time he worked as deputy director of the Shamakhi Astrophysical Observatory named after Nasraddin Tusi of the National Academy of Sciences of Azerbaijan.

In 1996–1997 he was engaged in teaching activities at the Azerbaijan State Pedagogical University; in 1998–1999 at the Baku State University; in 1996–1999 at the Academy of Labor and Social Relations.

Executive Director of the Science Development Foundation under the president of the Republic of Azerbaijan (2009–2019).

He is the head of the Department of Space Plasma and Heliogeophysical Problems of the Shemakha Astrophysical Observatory.

He is a member of the International Astronomical Union, European Astronomical Society, Eurasian Astronomical Society, International Biometric Society.

In September 2005, he was awarded the Taraggi Medal.
