= Aydin Mammadov (historian) =

Azerbaijani historian

- Aydın Məmmədov
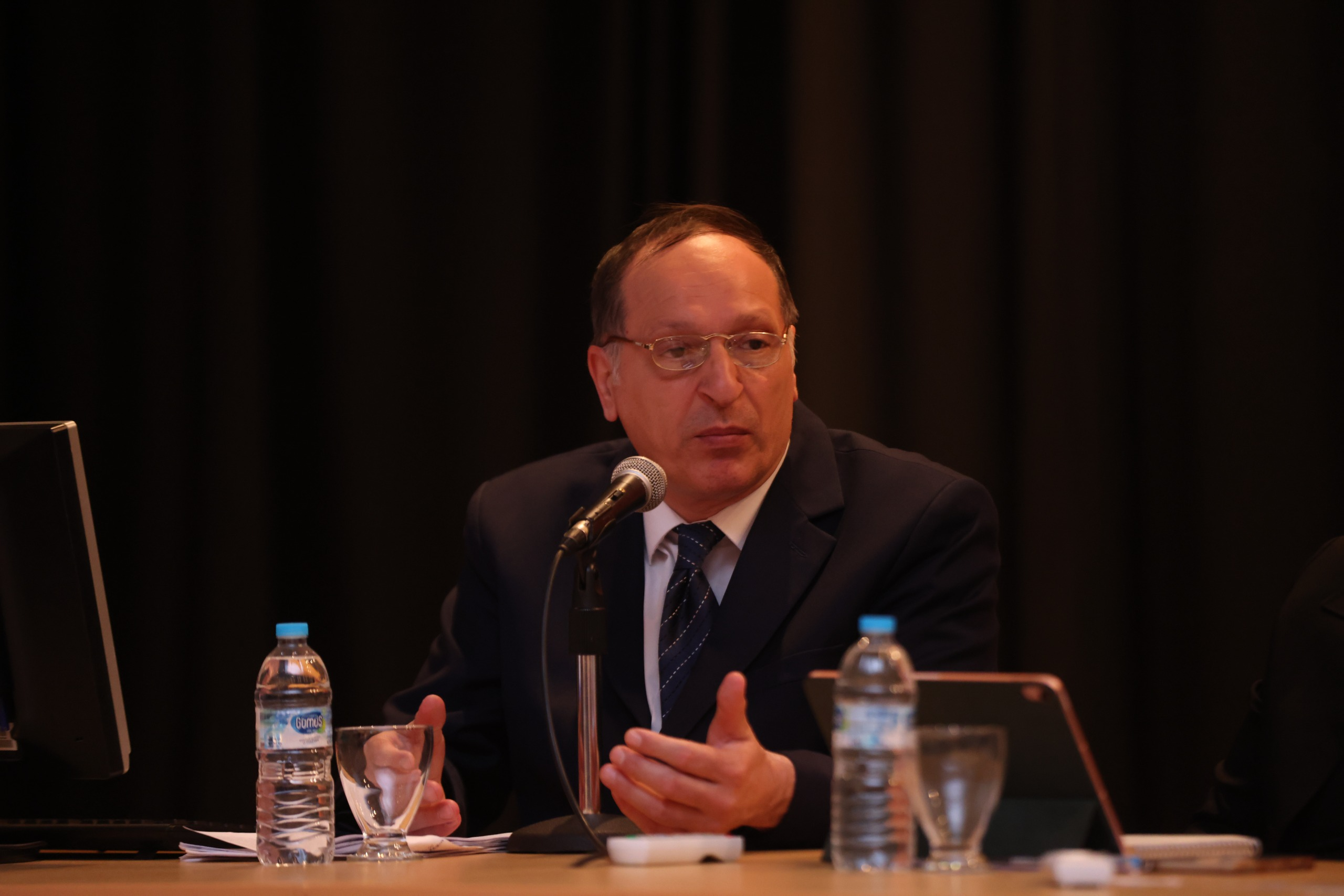
- Born: 21 November 1967 (age 58); Sumgait, Azerbaijan SSR, Soviet Union
- Citizenship: Azerbaijan
- Awards: Baku State University 100th anniversary medal
- Scientific career
- Fields: History
- Institutions: Baku State University

Aydin Balamirza oghlu Mammadov (Azerbaijani: Aydın Balamirzə oğlu Məmmədov) is an Azerbaijani historian, scientist-demographer, specialist on historical demography, Ph.D. in history, and associate professor of the department of "source study, historiography and methods" of Baku State University.

== Biography ==
Aydin Mammadov was born in 1967 in Sumgait. In 1975–1983, he studied at secondary school number 10 in Sumgait. He graduated from the Baku Pedagogical College named after Mirza Alakbar Sabir in 1983 and served in the Soviet Army in 1987–1989. He graduated with honours from the History faculty of Baku State University In 1989–1994 and was awarded a scholarship named after Karl Marx for excellent study at the university. He worked at Sumqayit State University and at various preparatory courses in 1994–1997.

In 2013, he received a PhD in history on the topic "Turkish policy of Germany and its historiography at the end of the 19th and beginning of the 20th centuries", speciality 5509.01 – "Historiography, source study and methods".

Since 2001, he has been working at the Department of Baku State University, "Source Studies, Historiography, and Methods".

In 2019, Aydin Mammadov wrote the first textbook "Historical Demography" in Azerbaijani language. In the same year, he was awarded “Baku State University 100th anniversary medal”.

In 2020-2025, he studied in the doctoral program of the Faculty of History of the Baku State University in the specialty 5509.01 – "Historiography, source studies and methods of historical research" for the degree of Doctor of Historical Sciences. He is conducting research on his doctoral dissertation on the topic "Current issues of historical demography in Azerbaijani and Russian historiography of the second half of the 20th century – early 21st century."

On April 9–11, 2025, he presented papers at panel conferences held in the cities of Izmir and Eskisehir in Turkey.

Mammadov is the author of about 100 scientific articles, 4 textbooks and teaching aids. He regularly holds scientific seminars at Baku State University on various topics, including “Scientific Features and Importance of Using Mathematical Methods in Historical Science.”

== Participation in international conferences, symposia, seminars ==
- Attempts by Germany to use national, moral and cultural values in Turkish politics of the late 19th - early 20th centuries // Cultural diversity as a socio-political value II National Forum of Cultural Studies Baku, 2010, pp. 201–203.
- Turkish policy of Germany in the late 19th - early 20th centuries and its historiography // Azerbaijan on the way to a developed society: realities, prospects: Materials of the republican scientific-practical conference of young researchers dedicated to February 2 - Youth Day. Baku, Azerbaijan University, February 2, 2011, pp. 221–222.
- Economic and political roots of Germany's attempts to gain a foothold in Turkey in the context of historiography // Materials of the International Scientific Conference "Actual Problems of Sustainable Development in the Context of Globalization" dedicated to the 88th anniversary of national leader Heydar Aliyev and the 93rd anniversary. Modern Azerbaijani statehood Baku, Azerbaijan University May 4–5, 2011, pp. 460–461.
- "The role of museums in strengthening student memory in history lessons." The I Republican Scientific Conference "Research, popularization, protection and restoration of national values protected in museums, archives and libraries" was held at the National History Museum of Azerbaijan, June 20, 2017, pp. 141–145.
- The role of museums in teaching historical demography in history lessons. II Republican scientific conference "Research, popularization, protection and restoration of national values protected in museums, archives and libraries", 2018, pp. 170–175.
- Issues of historical demography in the studies of Ahmad bey Agaoglu. PROCEEDING International Conference on Sustainable Development And Actual Problems of Humanitarian Sciences, May 14–15, 2018, pp. 469–475.
- Scientific knowledge on the historical demography of the Azerbaijani people. The place and role of the Faculty of History of Baku State University in the socio-political life of Azerbaijan. Republican scientific conference. Baku, October 8–9, 2019.
- Impact of the Second World War on the socio-economic and demographic situation of the population in Azerbaijan // International Scientific Conference "Azerbaijan during the Second World War", June 22, 2020.
- Issues of historical demography in the historiography of Azerbaijan in the second half of the twentieth century. III International Scientific Conference on Humanities and Social Sciences, April 6, 2021.
- Issues of historical demography in the studies of Azerbaijani historians of the second half of the twentieth century. Materials of the IV Republican Scientific and Practical Conference of Young Researchers, April 9, 2021.
- Demographic views on the influence of natural factors on the population in the work of Nizami Ganjavi. PROCEEDING International Conference on Works by Nizami Ganjavi as a literary and historical source, May 7, 2021, Baku, pp. 82–85.
- Historical and demographic views on the family model in the work of Nizami Ganjavi // Materials of the scientific-theoretical conference dedicated to the 880th anniversary of Nizami Ganjavi "Nizami Ganjavi: predecessors and successors - Medieval manuscripts and historical problems of Azerbaijani culture", Institute of Manuscripts named after Muhammad Fizuli ANAS, 22 November 2021.
- Population problems in studies on primitive society in the historiography of Azerbaijan in the second half of the 20th century // Proceedings of the I International Conference on the Fundamentals of the Humanities and Social Sciences, Baku, December 24, 2021.
- Problems of historical demography in studies on the territorial and demographic issues of Azerbaijan in the 19th century in the historiography of Azerbaijan in the second half of the 20th century - the beginning of the 21st century. IV International Scientific Conference "World Azerbaijanis: History and Modernity", Baku, December 29–30, 2021
- Issues of historical demography in the study of the processes associated with the ethnogenesis of the Azerbaijani people in the national historiography in the second half of the 20th century - the beginning of the 21st century. Proceedings International conference “Ethnogenesis of the Azerbaijani people and the national identity issues”, Baku, October 28, 2022.
- Influence of political processes taking place in Northern Azerbaijan in the 19th century on the demographic situation of Shusha in the historiography of Azerbaijan in the 21st century. Republican scientific conference "Historical and cultural heritage of Karabakh in the museum", Baku, November 1, 2022
- Historical and demographic issues in the scientific creativity of Azerbaijani historian and archeologist Mammadali Huseynov. AICNHS 1st International Conference on new horizons in science, January 12–15, 2023, Cairo, Egypt. pp. 108–113.
- Issues of historical demography in the research works of Azerbaijani historians on medieval period in the second half of 20th century // I International Scientific and Practical Conference «Modern science: experience, traditions, innovations», January 31 – February 1, 2023, Berlin. Germany. pp. 27–32.
- Historical-demographic characteristics of large families in Russian historiography of the second half of the 20th – early 21st centuries. XIV International Scientific and Practical Conference "Historical Experience of World Civilizations and Russia", Vladimir, Russia, December 4–5, 2025.
- Historical-demographic issues related to population settlement and growth in the report of V.V. Bartold, who participated in the First Turkological Congress. Materials of the International Scientific Conference on “Teaching Turkic Languages, Literatures and History in the Context of Modern Challenges”, Baku, June 29-30, 2026

== Selected works ==
=== Featured articles and programs ===
==== In Azerbaijani ====
- Almaniyanın Osmanlı imperiyasına müdaxiləsinin iqtisadi-siyasi köklər alman - rus tarixşünaslığın kontekstində // Tarix və Onun preblemlər No. 3, 2006
- XIX əsrin sonu XX əsrin əvvələrində Almaniyanın Türkiyəyə müdaxiləsi və alman-inglis ziddiyyətləri rus - alman tarixşünaslığında // ADPU "Xəbərlər" Humanitar elmlər seriyası, No. 1., 2004
- [http://static.bsu.az/w8/Tarix%20ve%20onun%20problem/2013%20%20%202/seh.346-350.pdf XIX sonu - XX əsrin əvvəllərində Almaniyanın Türkiyəyə dair bank - kredit siyasəti alman və rus tarixşünaslığında // Tarix və Onun problemləri Bakı, 2013 № 2 s.346-351]
- Azərbaycan xalqının qədim inancları tarixi tədqiqatlarda. Tarix və onun problemləri N3, səh.267-272, 2015.
- Tarix fənninin tədrisində incəsənətlə tərbiyə BDU-nun Xəbərləri humanitar seriyası N3, səh.123-128, 2015.
- Anar İsgəndərov, Adil Mövlayi. Şeyxülislamlığın tarixi. Bakı, 2016 (tarixi mənbələrini tərcümə etmişdir.)
- Xalqımızın Novruz Bayramı ilə bağlı inancları. Tarix və Onun problemləri N2, 2016. səh. 327-331.
- Azərbaycan Xalqının Günəş kultuna dair inanclar. Tarix və Onun Problemlər No.1 Tarix və Onun No. 1, Bakı 2017
- Azərbaycan xalqının qədim inanc, adət və mərasimlərində demoqrafik baxışlar. Tarix və Onun Problemləri No. 1, 2018, 344–349
- Azərbaycan Xalqının daşla bağlı inanclarında tarixi demoqrafiya məsələləri. GeoStrategiya No. 02 (44) mart-aprel, 2018 il, s. 37-40.
- Azərbaycan Xalq Cümhuriyyəti Xadimlərinin əsərlərində tarixi demoqrafik baxışlar. Tarix və Onun Problemləri No. 2. 2018. s. 51-57
- Tarixi demoqrafiya proqramı // Mənbəşünaslıq, tarixşünaslıq və metodika kafedrası Bakalavr seviyyəsi üçün Tarix fakültəsinin Tarixçi - 050206 üzrə İPF-B01. Bakı. 2018
- Azərbaycan xalqının qədim ailə institutu milli adət və inanclar sistemində // AMEA Məhəmməd Füzuli adına Əlyazmalar İnstitutu. Elmi Əsərlər N1(6), 2018. s. 80-87
- Azərbaycan xalqının Günəşlə bağlı folklor nümunələrində tarixi demoqrafiya məsələləri. //AMEA- Məhəmməd Füzuli adına Əlyazmalar İnstitutu. Elmi Əsərlər N2(7), 2018. s. 18-23.
- zərbaycan xalqının təbiətlə bağlı inanclarında tarixi demoqrafiya məsələlərinin tədqiqi // Tarix və Onun problemləri, N3, 2018, s. 316-321.
- İbn Xəldunun tarixi-demoqrafik baxışları. Tarix və onun problemləri. N4, 2018. s. 269-272.
- Azərbaycan Tarixşünaslığında Xalqımızın İslamqədərki Dəfn Mərasimlərində Tarixi Demoqrafik Məsələlərin Tədqiqi. BDU-Xəbərləri ( humanitar seriyası) N3, 2018, s. 78-85
- Tarixi demoqrafiyanın aktual məsələlərinə dair. Tarix və onun problemləri No.1, 2019. s. 269-275.
- İbn Sinanın tarixi-demoqrafik baxışları. Tarix və onun problemləri №2, 2019. s. 382-386.
- Azərbaycan xalqının ağac və bitkilərlə bağlı qədim inanc, adət və mərasimlərində demoqrafik baxışlar."Folklorşünaslıq" beynəlxalq elmi-nəzəri jurnal, 2019. s. 37-43.
- Antik dövr mütəfəkkir və alimlərinin demoqrafik baxışları. Tarix və Onun Problemləri, 2019, N3, s. 357-361.
- Azərbaycanın 20-30-cu illər tarixşünaslığında tarixi demoqrafiya məsələləri. Tarix və Onun Problemləri, 2019, N4, s. 270-275.
- Azərbaycanın qədim və orta əsrlər şəhər və əhalisi tarixi mənbələrdə. BDU-nun Xəbərləri humanitar seriyası N2, 2019, s.101-106.
- Azərbaycan xalqının su ilə bağlı qədim inanc, adət və mərasimlərində tarixi-demoqrafik baxışlar. AMEA Məhəmməd Füzuli adına Əlyazmalar İnstitutu. Elmi Əsərlər N2(9), 2019. s. 26-32.
- Azərbaycan folklorunda ana ilə bağlı nümunələrdə tarixi-demoqrafiya məsələləri. AMEA Məhəmməd Füzuli adına Əlyazmalar İnstitutu. Elmi Əsərlər N1 (10) yanvar-iyun, 2020. s. 36-41.
- XIX əsrdə Azərbaycanda cərəyan edən siyasi proseslərin demoqrafik vəziyyətə təsiri. Dünya azərbaycanlıları: tarix və müasirlik (elmi-nəzəri toplu), VII buraxılış, Bakı, "Füyuzat", 2020, s.91-97.
- Azərbaycan xalqının Vətənin müdafiəsi və ananın yenilməzliyi ilə bağlı inanclar sistemində tarixi demoqrafiya məsələləri. Dünya azərbaycanlıları: tarix və müasirlik (elmi-nəzəri toplu), VII buraxılış, Bakı, "Füyuzat", 2020, s. 141-148.
- Azərbaycan xalqının daşla bağlı inanclarında şəhid ruhlarına ehtiram və nəsil artımı ilə bağlı tarixi demoqrafik baxışlar. Tarix və Onun Problemləri, Bakı, 2020, Xüsusi buraxılış, s.113-119.
- Azərbaycanın XX əsrin ikinci yarısı tarixşünaslığında tarixi demoqrafiya məsələləri. Humanitar və ictimai elmlər üzrə III Beynəlxalq Elmi konfransın materialları, Bakı, 2021, s.16-22
- Azərbaycan 40-50-ci illər tarixşünaslığında tarixi demoqrafiya məsələləri. Tarix və Onun Problemləri, 2021, N1, s.165-168.
- Dahi Azərbaycan şairi Nizami Gəncəvinin ailə modeli və nəsil artımı ilə bağlı tarixi demoqrafik baxışları. Tarix və Onun Problemləri, 2021, N2, s.257-261.
- Nizami Gəncəvinin əsərlərində ətraf mühit, təbii-coğrafi amillər və məskunlaşma problemləri. İpək yolu, No.2, 2021, s.5-12.
- Azərbaycan 60–70-ci illər tarixşünaslığında tarixi demoqrafiya məsələləri. Tarix və Onun Problemləri, 2021, N3, s.212–217.
- "Kitabi-Dədə Qorqud" eposunda Azərbaycan xalqının əhali artımı ilə bağlı tarixi-demoqrafik baxışları. Dədə Qorqud dünyası elmi-nəzəri jurnal, № 1 (3), 2021, s.71–80
- XX əsrin ikinci yarısı Azərbaycan və Rusiya tarixçilərinin ibtidai cəmiyyətdə məskunlaşma və ona təsir edən amillərlə bağlı tədqiqat əsərlərində tarixi demoqrafiya məsələləri. Tarix və Onun Problemləri, 2021, N4, s.254–262.
- XX əsrin ikinci yarısı Azərbaycan tarixçilərinin orta əsrlər dövrünə dair tədqiqat əsərlərində tarixi demoqrafiya məsələləri. Dünya azərbaycanlıları: tarix və müasirlik (elmi-nəzəri toplu), VIII buraxılış, Bakı, "Füyuzat", 2021, 160 s, s.91–99.
- XX əsrin ikinci yarısı – XXI əsrin əvvəllərində Azərbaycan tarixçilərinin 1918-ci ilin mart soyqırımları ilə bağlı tədqiqat əsərlərində tarixi demoqrafiya məsələləri. Tarix və Onun Problemləri, 2022, N1, s.52–61.
- XX əsrin ikinci yarısı – XXI əsrin əvvəlləri Azərbaycan və Rusiya tarixçilərinin orta əsrlər dövrünə dair tədqiqat əsərlərində tarixi demoqrafiya məsələləri. Tarix, insan və cəmiyyət, 1 (34), 2022, s.21–32.
- “Kitabi-Dədə Qorqud” eposunda doğum və ölümlə bağlı tarixi demoqrafiya məsələlər. Dədə Qorqud dünyası elmi-nəzəri jurnal, № 1, 2022, s.28-38.
- Azərbaycan xalçalarındakı naxışlarda tarixi demoqrafiya elementləri. Bakı Universitetinin xəbərləri (humanitar elmlər seriyası), № 1, 2022, s.73–84.
- XX əsrin ikinci yarısı Azərbaycan tarixşünaslığında ibtidai dövrdə Qarabağda məskunlaşma ilə bağlı tarixi demoqrafiya məsələləri. Tarix və onun problemləri, 2022, № 2, s.249–254.
- XX əsrin ikinci yarısı – XXI əsrin əvvəlləri Vətən tarixşünaslığında Azərbaycanın orta əsr şəhərlərinə dair tədqiqat əsərlərində tarixi demoqrafiya məsələləri. Tarix, insan və cəmiyyət, 2 (35), 2022, s.11-20.
- XX əsrin II yarısı Vətən tarixşünaslığında ermənilərin xalqımıza qarşı törətdikləri soyqırımları və sosial-iqtisadi dağıntıların qarşısının alınmasında Azərbaycan-Türkiyə qardaşlığının tədqiqi. Azərbaycan və Türkiyənin iqtisadi əməkdaşlığının strateji istiqamətləri. Beynəlxalq elmi konfrans (26-27 may 2022). Sumqayıt, 2022, s.404-409.
- XX əsrin II yarısı Azərbaycan tarixşünaslığında antik dövr şəhərlərinə dair tədqiqat əsərlərində tarixi demoqrafiya məsələləri. Tarix, insan və cəmiyyət, 3 (36), 2022, s.13-25.
- Azərbaycan arxeoloq-tarixçisi Fazil Osmanovun XX əsrin II yarısı – XXI əsrin əvvəllərinə dair elmi tədqiqat əsərlərində tarixi demoqrafiya məsələləri. Bakı Universitetinin xəbərləri (humanitar elmlər seriyası), № 3, 2022, s.62–74.
- XX əsrin əvvəllərində erməni-daşnak birləşmələrinin Şuşada törətdikləri soyqırımlarının Azərbaycanın demoqrafik vəziyyətinə təsiri XXI əsr Vətən tarixşünaslığında. Tarix, insan və cəmiyyət, 4 (37), 2022, s.126-136.
- XIX əsrdə Azərbaycanın tarixi demoqrafiya problemləri Vətən tarixşünaslığında. Dünya azərbaycanlıları: tarix və müasirlik (elmi-nəzəri toplu), IX buraxılış, Bakı, "Füyuzat", 2022/2023, s.72–80.
- XX əsrin II yarısı Rusiya alimlərinin ailə ilə bağlı tədqiqat əsərlərində tarixi demoqrafiya məsələləri. Tarix və onun problemləri, 2023, № 1, s. 249-254
- Məmmədəli Hüseynovun tədqiqat əsərlərində əhali artımı və məskunlaşmasına dair tarixi demoqrafiya məsələləri. “Pedaqoji Universitetin Xəbərləri” Humanitar, ictimai və pedaqoji-psixoloji elmlər seriyası, c.71, №1, 2023, s. 67-77.
- XX əsrin II yarısı Azərbaycan və Rusiya tarixşünaslığında tarixi demoqrafiyanın aktual məsələləri. Tarix, insan və cəmiyyət, 1 (38), 2023, s.66-78.
- Heydər Əliyev və Azərbaycan Respublikasının Demoqrafik İnkişaf Konsepsiyası. Tarix və onun problemləri, 2023, № 2, Xüsusi buraxılış, s.107–115
- XX əsrin ikinci yarısı – XXI əsrin əvvəlləri Rusiya tarixşünaslığında əhalinin təbii artım tempinin azalması ilə bağlı tarixi demoqrafiyanın aktual problemləri. Tarix və onun problemləri, 2023, № 4, s.185–192.
- XX əsrin II yarısı – XXI əsrin əvvəlləri Rusiya tarixşünaslığında əhali artımının tənzimlənməsinə dair tarixi demoqrafiya məsələləri. Bakı Universitetinin xəbərləri (humanitar elmlər seriyası), № 3, 2023, s.5–14.
- B.Urlanisin tədqiqat əsərlərində tarixi demoqrafiya məsələləri. Tarix və onun problemləri, 2024, № 2, s. 218-227.
- Azərbaycan xalça naxışlarında xalqımızın əhali artımı ilə bağlı tarixi demoqrafik baxışları. Mahmud Kaşğarlı, Cild II, №1, 2024, s.124-134.
- XX əsrin ikinci yarısı Vətən tarixşünaslığında ibtidai cəmiyyətdə əhali problemlərinə dair tarixi demoqrafiya məsələləri. Tarix, insan və cəmiyyət, 1 (42), 2024, s.3-14.
- XX əsrin ikinci yarısı - XXI əsrin əvvəllərində Bakı Dövlət Universitetinin tarixçi-məzunlarının tədqiqat əsərlərində tarixi demoqrafiya məsələləri. Tarix və onun problemləri, 2024, № 3, Xüsusi buraxılış, s. 43-53.
- XIX əsrdə Qərbi Azərbaycanın tarixi demoqrafiya məsələlərinə dair. Bakı Universitetinin xəbərləri (humanitar elmlər seriyası), № 3, 2024, s.5–12.
- Tarixçi-demoqraf Kərim Şükürovun tədqiqat əsərlərində Azərbaycanın tarixi demoqrafiya məsələləri. Tarix, insan və cəmiyyət, 2 (47), 2025, s.14-21.
- “Kitabi-Dədə Qorqud” dastanında ailə institutu ilə bağlı tarixi demoqrafiya məsələləri. "Dədə Qorqud Dünyası" Beynəlxalq elmi jurnal, Cild 7, Sayı 2, 2025, s.31-36.
- Tədqiqat analitikasının aktual məsələlərinə dair. Tarix və onun problemləri, 2026, № 2, s.263-274.

==== In English ====
- Study of historical demographic issues in pre-Islamic funeral ceremonies of Turkic peoples in Azerbaijani historiography. Akademik Tarih ve Düşünce Dergisi, Cilt:8/sayı:2/Haziran, Ankara, 2021, pp. 481-494.
- Demographic situation in Azerbaijan in the middle ages in Azerbaijani historiography of the second half of the XX century - the beginning of the XXI century. Annali d’Italia, №40, 2023, pp.24–28.
- Historical and demographic views on environmental, natural geographical and population settlement issues in the works of Nizami Ganjavi. Norwegian Journal of development of the International Science, №102, 2023, pp.43-46.
- Historical and demographic issues related to ancient beliefs, customs and ceremonies of the Azerbaijani people (on the basis of Azerbaijani historiography in second half of the XX - early XXI centuries). Deutsche internationale Zeitschrift für zeitgenössische Wissenschaft, №57, 2023, pp.15-16
- The history of the development of the historical and demographic thought in Azerbaijan in the Azerbaijani historiography of the second half of the XX century – the beginning of the XXI century. Scientific discussion, Vol 1, No 77, 2023, pp.10-15
- The history of the development of the historical and demographic thought in Azerbaijan in the Azerbaijani historiography of the second half of the XX century – the beginning of the XXI century. Danish scientific journal, № 85, 2024, pp.37-42.
- Historical-Demographic Dynamics of Medieval Azerbaijan: A Comparative Historiographical Examination of Population Structure, Ethnicity, Migration, and Socio-Political Transformations. Architecture Image Studies, Vol.6, Issue 3, 2025, pp.1125-1135.

==== In Russian ====
- Попытки усиления Германии в Турции в конце XIX начале XX века на материалах русской и германской историографии // Межкультурные коммуникации. Тбилиси, No. 8. 2009. стр. 107–116.
- Историография банковско - кредитной политики Германии в Турции в конце XIX - начале XX века // Гилея. Научный вестник - Сборник научных статей по истории, философии и права Украинской Академии Наук. Киев, 2014 г. выпуск 83 (No.4) стр. 131 - 134.
- Программа Историографии по истории США., БГУ, 2016.
- Культ Солнца в доисламской системе верований Азербайджанского народа. Akademik Tarih ve Düşünce Dergisi, Uluslararası Hakemi Dergi Cilt:IV/sayı:XI/Mayıs/MMXVII, Ankara Üniversitesi, 2017. стр. 200–209.
- Культ Солнца в древней системе верований азербайджанцев. İrs-Наследие, №5 (89), 2017. стр. 32–37.
- К символике орнамента на азербайджанских коврах. İrs-Наследие, №110, 2021, стр.40-44.
- Историко-демографические особенности многодетности в российской историографии второй половины XX– начала XXI века. Матералы XIV Международной научно-практической конференции «Исторический опыт мировых цивилизаций и Россия» (4 – 5 декабря 2025 г.). Владимир, Изд-во ВлГУ, 2026, 555 с. стр.193-206.
- Роль древних историко-демографических представлений и верований азербайджанского народа в укреплении института семьи в отечественной историографии. Science and education: modern time, №20, 2026, стр.90-96.

==== In Spanish ====
- Sobre la ornamentación y simbolismo de las alfombras Azerbaiyanas. İrs-Herencia, № 15, 2023, p.28-32.

=== Scientific books ===
- Искендеров А., Мамедов А. Историческая демография. Баку, "Elm və təhsil", 2017, 164 с.
- Мамедов А., Халилзаде А. Историография истории США. Учебное Пособие по специальности 050211 Регионоведение (американистика). Баку, "АГУКИ", 2018, 142 с.
- Məmmədov A. Tarixi demoqrafiya. Dərslik. Bakı, 2019, 232 s.
- İsgəndərov A., Məmmədov A. Tarix və onun metodologiyası. Ali məktəblər üçün dərslik. Bakı, "ADMİU", 2024, 312 s.
