= Baku State University =

Public university in Baku, Azerbaijan

- Bakı Dövlət Universiteti
- Other name: BDU
- Former name: Azerbaijan State University (1924–1991)
- Other campuses: Quba; Khizi; Gazakh
- Type: Public
- Established: 1 September 1919; 107 years ago
- Founder: Parliament of the Azerbaijan Democratic Republic
- Rector: Maleyka Abbaszadeh
- Faculty: 3,000
- Students: 26,000
- Location: AZ1148, Academician Zahid Khalilov str. 33, Baku, Azerbaijan; 40°22′23″N 49°48′41″E
- Campus: Urban (8.62 ha) 4 buildings
- Newspaper Television: Bakı Universiteti; BDUTV
- Transportation: Metro: Line 2 Elmlər Akademiyası station Bus №: 3, 6, 10, 17, 18, 29, 53, 96, 206
- Colors: Beige and blue
- Mascot: The university doesn’t have a mascot
- Website: bsu.edu.az

Baku State University (BSU) (BDU; Azerbaijani: Bakı Dövlət Universiteti) is a public university located in Baku, Azerbaijan. Established on 1 September 1919 by the Parliament of Azerbaijan Democratic Republic, the university started with faculties of history and philology, physics and mathematics, and law and medicine, with an initial enrollment of 1094. The first rector of BSU was V.I.Razumovsky, a former professor of surgery at Kazan University.

In 1930, the government of the Azerbaijan Soviet Socialist Republic ordered the university shut down in accordance with a reorganization of higher education, and the university was replaced with the Supreme Pedagogical Institute. However, in 1934 the university was reestablished again and continued to work through the difficult years of World War II experiencing a shortage of faculty members.

By its 40th anniversary in 1959, the university already had 13 faculties. The Azerbaijan Medical University and Azerbaijan State Economic University were both spun-offs of the original respective faculties at BSU.

Among the graduates of BSU were two former presidents of Azerbaijan, Abulfaz Elchibey and Heydar Aliyev. The former graduated from the Faculty of Arabic Language and Literature, while the latter, who dominated Azerbaijan's political life for over 30 years, from the Faculty of History. Nobel Prize-winning physicist Lev Landau studied at BSU between 1922 and 1924.

BSU is the only university from Azerbaijan ranked by international ranking organizations, such as University Ranking by Academic Performance and currently ranks at 1872 in the University Ranking by Academic Performance.

== History ==
Coat of arms of Baku State University in 1919.

BSU was established on September 1, 1919, by the decision of the Parliament of Azerbaijan Democratic Republic. The university was established as a part of 4 faculties (history and philology, physics and mathematics, lawing, and medicine). The first rector of the university was the famous surgeon V. I. Razumovsky. Among the leading professors in 1920-40 were Azerbaijani writer Abdurrahim bey Hagverdiyev, Orientalist Professor P.K. Juze, Professor A.O. Makovelski, Professor A.O. Mishel and other scholars. During that period the administration of the university invited to Baku such teachers as N.Y. Marr, V.V. Bartold, the academician of the Eastern Science Academy Fuad bek Kuprulluzade.

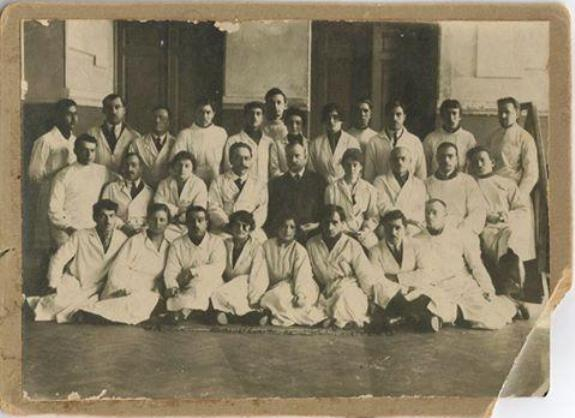
The students of Medical Faculty of Baku Student University in 1923.

The university was liquidated in 1930 in accordance with the decision made by the Council of the People's Commissar on reorganization. The High Pedagogical Institute was created as a replacement. The university resumed its activity in 1934 and soon became the republic's scientific-pedagogical center. Despite the shortage of university teachers caused by their service in the Second World War, the university managed to maintain its leading position. In 1945, the teachers took an active part in founding the Azerbaijan Academy of Science. The majority of the republic's top universities — such as Azerbaijan Medical University, Azerbaijan University of Economy, Azerbaijan State Pedagogical University and others — were founded on the basis of Baku State University.

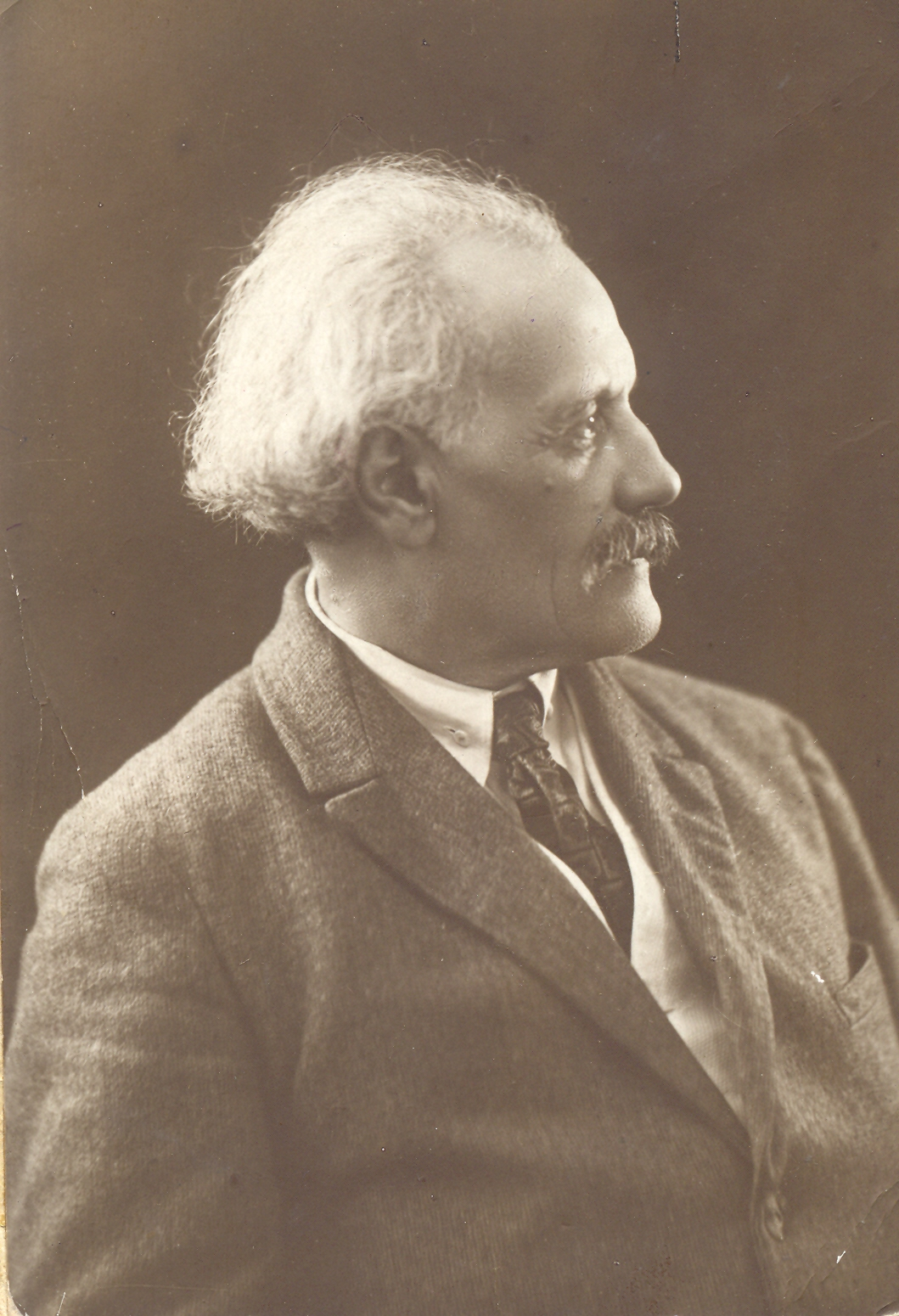
Abdurrahim bey Hagverdiyev, one of the lecturers of Baku State University.

The years following 1969 can be considered as a period of further development in the direction of knowledge and science. Faculties on modern specialties, departments and about 30 scientific research laboratories were founded during this period of time. The university continued to grow and develop under the presidency of Heydar Aliyev, with further specialties, departments, and scientific laboratories beginning their operation. Given its extensive historical background, Baku State University was always a major scientific and educational center in Azerbaijan. Famous scientists, intellectuals and politicians and Azerbaijan's outstanding politician, Heydar Aliyev graduated from Baku State University. As of May 2021, Baku State University offers 16 majors with 55 bachelor and 153 master's degrees.

The 100th anniversary of Baku State University was commemorated throughout during the year 2019 in Azerbaijan and also in Vienna, Austria (September 2019) and at the headquarters of UNESCO in Paris (June 2019). A special medal in honor of the 100th anniversary of BSU - "The 100th jubilee (1919-2019) medal of Baku State University" was issued by the Presidential Decree in November 2019, with 113 people being subsequently awarded this Medal.

== International relations ==
Currently, BSU is a member of various associations and institutions such as the Association of Universities of Eurasia, which unites most universities of the former USSR. Between 2002 and 2004, BSU led the Association of Universities of Black Sea States. The university has also signed agreements on scientific and technical cooperation and student-teacher exchange programs with the Moscow State University, Middle East Technical University, Nice-Sofia Antipole University, Indiana University, Kyiv National University, Vienna University, and several other high-ranking institutions. As a result of these initiatives, the university holds joint scientific conferences, workshops, and publishes textbooks.

== Academics ==
University rankings

Global – Overall
- ARWU World: 401-500
- QS World: =688 (2026)
- RUR World: 962
- THE World: =1501

Global – Science and engineering
- THE Engineering: 1001-1250
- THE Physical Sciences: =1001

Regional – Overall
- QS Emerging Europe and Central Asia: 251-300
- QS Europe: 336

National – Overall
- ARWU National: 2
- QS National: 1
- THE National: 1

Baku State University (BSU) is regarded as one of the most prestigious universities in Azerbaijan. It is the oldest institution of higher education in the country, and has played a significant role in the development of Azerbaijan's educational system. The university offers various academic programs across fields such as natural sciences, humanities, social sciences, and engineering. BSU is known for its academic and research activities, with a focus on both theoretical and applied sciences. It has a faculty composed of scholars and professionals, and it maintains collaborations with other academic institutions internationally. The university provides facilities such as laboratories, libraries, and research centers to support its academic and research endeavors.

BSU provides education at three levels: bachelor's, master's, and doctoral programs, according to the European Credit Transfer System. The university operates in accordance with the Constitution of the Republic of Azerbaijan, the Law on Education, and decrees of the Ministry of Science Education and other relevant ministries. The university currently has 17 faculties covering 60 bachelor's specialities, 197 master's specialities, and 70 doctoral specialities. Training is available in Azerbaijani, Russian, and English. Some 1,000 foreign students are studying at the university. The university employs a staff of some 1,500 professors with 127 as independent departments. BSU consists of several research institutes and centers, including Applied Mathematics, Physics, Azerbaijani Language and Literature, History, Genetics, and Nanotechnology. The University has more than 30 research laboratories that are involved in different scientific works.

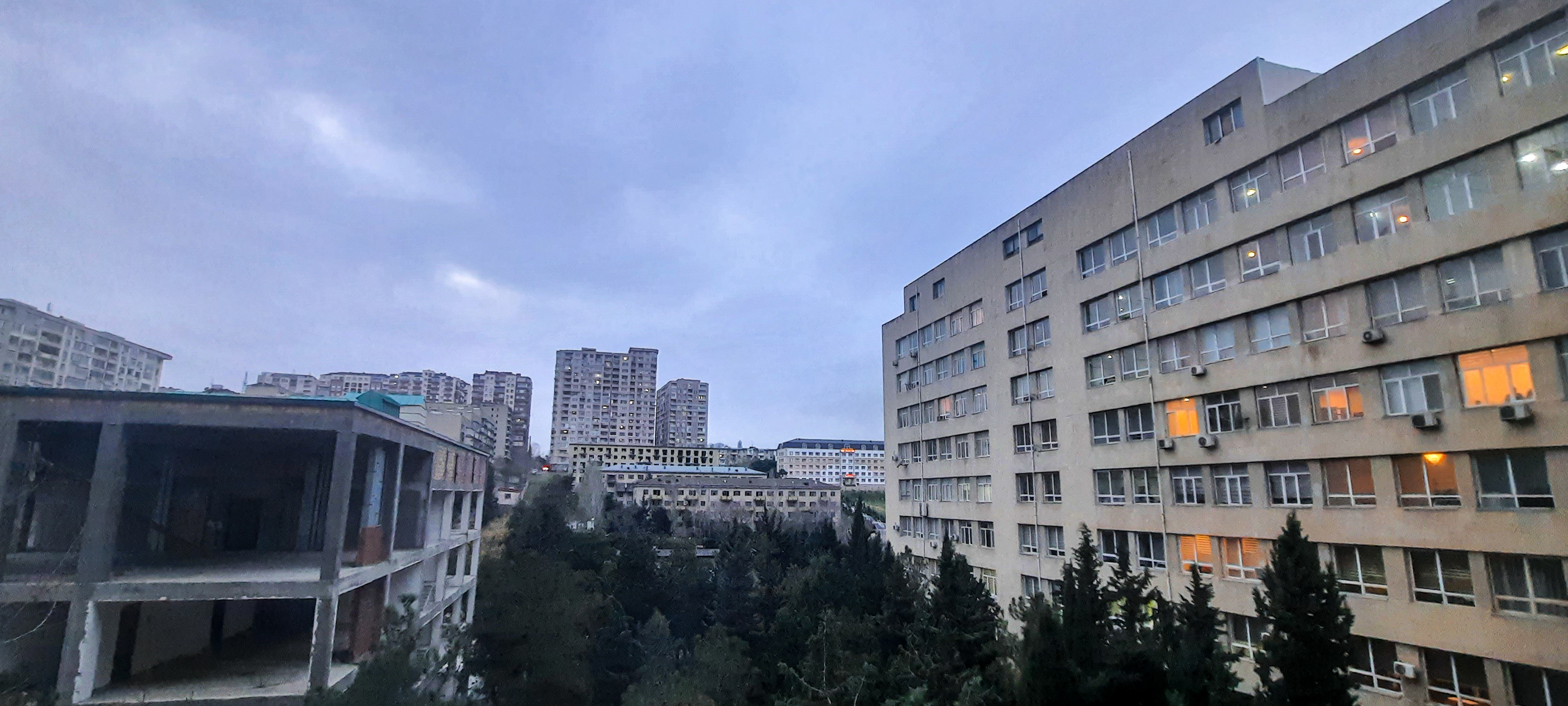
Backyard of Baku State University.

Starting from the academic year 2011-2012, English-language programs were expanded in 16 disciplines: mathematics, physics, chemistry, biology, computer science, law, international relations, economics, and journalism. SABAH groups, established in 2014-2015, provide students with field-specific and competitive training; the curriculum is carried out in modern-equipped classrooms. For future teachers, pedagogical training programs are available in subjects such as mathematics, physics, chemistry, history, and languages, associated with a scholarship program for high-achieving students. Students take part in teaching, research, and industrial internships with partner institutions including Coca-Cola, SOCAR, and pharmaceutical companies. On a faculty level, there are specific internships also conducted in pre-identified research and industry sites. It also has training and research facilities, such as the Quba Training, Experience, and Recreation Center, which opened in 2013, serving students and staff for field training and research. It houses conference halls, laboratories, and sports facilities. Altıağac Training and Practice Base, established in 1990, supports field studies in ecology, soil science, and biology.

=== Baku State University Scientific Library ===
The Scientific Library of Baku State University, having been set up in 1919 alongside the university, is the largest academic library in Azerbaijan. This is one of the central facilities for students, professors, and researchers alike. The library contains vast resources in the form of books, journals, and other academic materials on many disciplines. It cooperates within its academic network with other university libraries of Azerbaijan and participates in international exchange with 49 universities and publishing houses from 21 countries. The library is one of the BSU support centers for research and education.

== Faculties and institutes ==
=== Faculties ===
1. Mechanics and Mathematics
2. Applied Mathematics and Cybernetics
3. Physics
4. Chemistry
5. Biology
6. Ecology and Soil sciences
7. Geography
8. Geology
9. Philology
10. History
11. International Relations and Economics
12. Law
13. Journalism
14. Librarian-information
15. Oriental Studies
16. Social Sciences and Psychology

== Rectors ==
- Vasily Razumovsky (1919-1920)
- Sergey Nikolayevich Davidenkov (1920-1923)
- Alexander Dmitrievich Gulyayev (1923-1926)
- Taghi Shahbazi Simurg (1926-1929)
- Vladimir Yelpatyevsky (1929)
- Magsud Mammadov (1929-1930)
- Mammadkazim Alakbarli (1934-1935)
- Bala Bey Hasanbeyov (1935-1937)
- Aziz Aliyev (1937)
- Jabrayil Alasgarov (1937-1941)
- Shamil Aliyev (1941-1944)
- Abdulla Garayev (1944-1950)
- Jafar Hajiyev (1950-1954)
- Yusif Mammadaliyev (1954-1958)
- Shafayat Mehdiyev (1958-1965)
- Mehdi Aliyev (1965-1970)
- Faig Bagirzade (1970-1987)
- Yahya Mammadov (1987-1989)
- Jamil Guliyev (1989-1990)
- Mirabbas Gasimov (1990-1992)
- Firudin Samandarov (1992-1993)
- Murtuz Alasgarov (1993-1996)
- Misir Mardanov (1996-1998)
- Abel Maharramov (1999-2018)
- Firudin Gurbanov (2018-2019)
- Elchin Babayev (2019–2026)
- Maleyka Abbaszadeh (2026–present)

=== Research institutes ===
1. Scientific Research Institute of Applied Mathematics
2. Institute of Problems of Theoretical Physics

== Affiliations ==
The university is a member of the Caucasus University Association.

== Alumni ==
See for more information on:

- Abulfaz Elchibey – 2nd President of Azerbaijan
- Alec Rasizade – Azerbaijani-American professor of history and political science
- Ali Omarov – Prosecutor General of the Republic of Azerbaijan
- Alik Ismail-Zadeh – mathematical geophysicist
- Arif Acaloğlu – folklorist, Turkologist, anthropologist, translator, and former advisor
- Arif Yunus – historian
- Aslan Aslanov – Director General of the Azerbaijan State Telegraph Agency
- Aydin Kazimzade – cinematographer
- Bakhtiyar Sirajov – nuclear scientist
- Heydar Aliyev – 3rd President of Azerbaijan
- Hikmat Ziya – poet, children's writer
- Intigam Aliyev – human rights activist
- Lev Landau – theoretical physicist
- Mikayil Jabbarov – current Minister of Economу of the Republic of Azerbaijan
- Rafig Hashimov – newscaster and screenwriter
- Rauf Mirgadirov – journalist
- Shaig Asgarov – economist
- Vougar Aslanov – writer and journalist
- Nahide Babashli – singer
- Kamala Abiyeva – judge
- Novella Jafaroghlu – chemist and politician
- Mammad Yaqubov – scientist
- Yusif Mammadov – scientist

== See also ==
- List of universities and colleges in Azerbaijan
