= Asterius of Caesarea =

Roman senator and Christian martyr

Saint Asterius

Martyr
- Died: 262; Caesarea, Palaestina
- Venerated in: Roman Catholic Church, Eastern Orthodox Church
- Canonized: Pre-congregation
- Feast: 3 March Roman Catholic; 7 August Eastern Orthodox

Asterius of Caesarea was a Roman senator who became a Christian martyr. After Asterius gave a Christian burial to the Roman soldier Marinus of Caesarea, who suffered martyrdom, he too was condemned to death and beheaded.

Both saints share a feast day on March 3 in the Catholic Church.
