= Bakhtiyar Sirajov =

Azerbaijani physicist (born 1957)

- Bəxtiyar Siracov
- Born: 21 October 1957 (age 68); Baku, Azerbaijan SSR, USSR
- Education: Baku State University
- Awards: Nobel Peace Prize (Note: In some categories, the Nobel Prize is awarded not to individuals, but to a team as a whole. These cases are observed when awarding economics, physics and chemistry. At this time, the International Nobel Commission evaluates the work done by that team and presents them with a common prize. The prize money won is distributed among the team members.)

Bakhtiyar Sirajov (Azerbaijani: Bəxtiyar Tahir oğlu Siracov/Бəxтияр Тaһир oғлу Сирaҹoв, Azerbaijani pronunciation: [bæxtiˈjɑɾ ˈtɑːhiɾ oɣˈlu siɾɑˈdʒov]; born 21 October 1957) is an Azerbaijani nuclear scientist who has worked for International Atomic Energy Agency (IAEA) since 1995. His team was awarded the 2005 Nobel Peace Prize. He is holding PhD degrees in physics and mathematics.

== Biography ==
Bakhtiyar Sirajov was born in 1957 in Baku. After graduating school in Baku in 1974, he was enrolled to the Applied Mathematics Faculty of Azerbaijan State University (now Baku State University).

After graduating from university in 1979, Sirajov started working at Azerbaijan National Academy of Sciences. Between 1980 and 1981, he engaged in scientific researches in Russian Academy of Sciences. From 1987 to 1988, he worked in Slovak Academy of Sciences in Bratislava, Slovakia. In 1990, he defended his thesis and became a PhD. After participating in developing various software projects in a private IT company from 1992 to 1995, Sirajov started working at International Atomic Energy Agency in Vienna, Austria.

=== Nobel Peace Prize ===
In 2005, Mohamed ElBaradei and the IAEA, of which Bakhtiyar Sirajov was part of the team, were jointly awarded the Nobel Peace Prize "for their efforts to prevent nuclear energy from being used for military purposes and to ensure that nuclear energy for peaceful purposes is used in the safest possible way".

== Publications ==
- Tank Monitoring Evaluation Systems: Methods and Algorithms (2009)
