= Rafig Hashimov =

Azerbaijani journalist (born 1966)

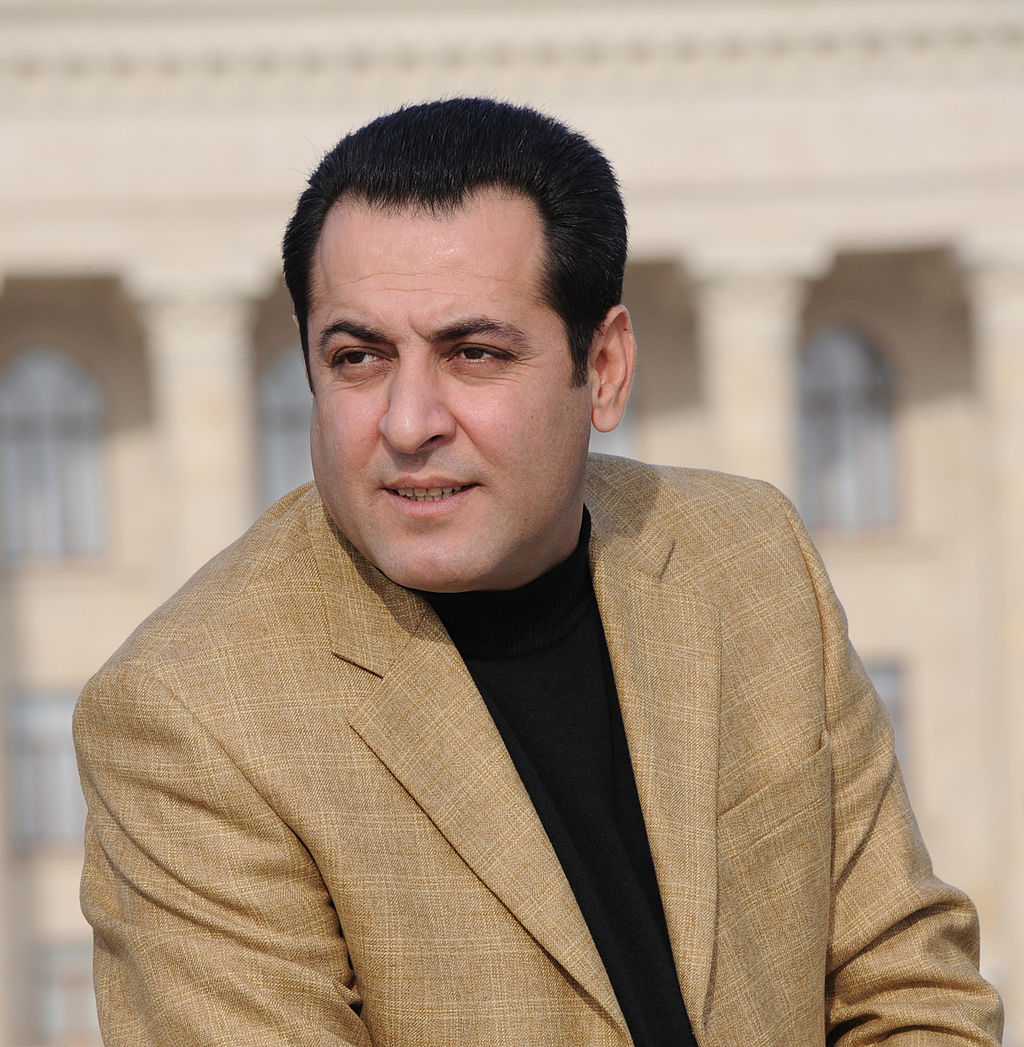
- Born: Rafiq Həşimov; August 11, 1966 (age 59); Ujar, Azerbaijan
- Occupations: Journalist, Speaker, Screenwriter, Director
- Years active: 1987–present

Rafig Hashimov (born August 11, 1966) is an announcer of AzTV, tele-journalist, essayist, director.

== Early life and education ==
Hashimov Rafig Mahammad was born in 1966. He graduated from “Television and radio equipment” faculty of Baku Communication Electronics technical school in 1985. He served in the Soviet Army in 1985–1987.

== Career ==
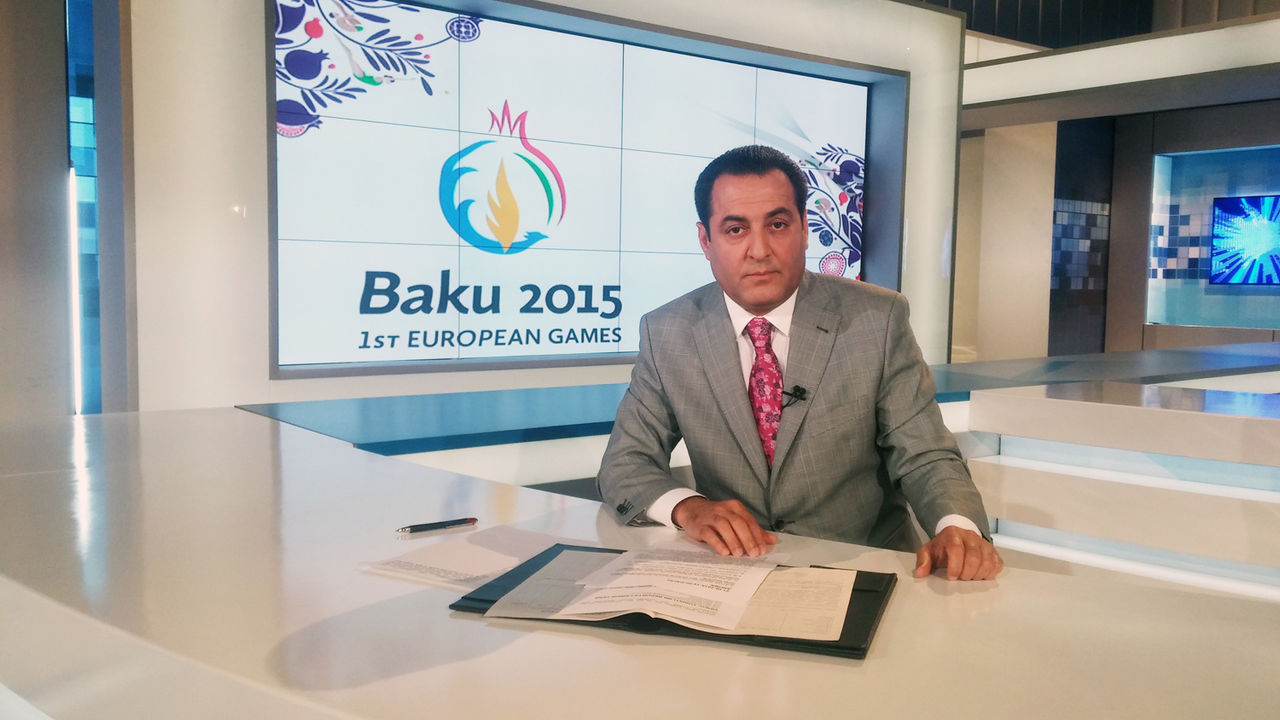
Rafig Hashimov in 2015

In 1987, has started to work at Azerbaijan State Tele-radio Broadcast Company as technician. Afterwards, he worked as videographer, erector. Since 1990, works as an announcer. In 1997, has graduated “Journalism” faculty of Baku State University. During these years, he was an announcer of “News”, different state events, “XX century” author program, “Morning” program. He trained the announcers from “Space”, “Leader” and “Khazar” channels with their speeches, taught speech culture at “Khazar” university for 4 years. His stories and essays, translations into Azerbaijani from the world classics literature, as well as from Nobel Prize laureate Hermann Hesse, Czeslaw Milosz, Jorge Luis Borxes, were published in the magazines and newspapers in our country. Over 20 featured-documentary films had been shot based on his scenarios. . According to the request by the Ministry of Culture and Tourism, he had produced feature-documentary film named “Unfinished dairy” dedicated to the Martyr Fuad Asadov in 2011 and documentary film named “Sattar’s Azerbaijan” dedicated to prominent Azerbaijani artist Sattar Bahlulzadeh in 2014. He prepared films and programs dedicated to the prominent figures of science, culture and art as the author and announcer of the cultural author program series “XX century”. Since 2008, he is a member of the Writer's Union of Azerbaijan. On November 4, 1998, he was awarded to the title of the "Honored Artist of Azerbaijan" according to the decree by Nationwide Leader Heydar Aliyev.

== Filmography ==
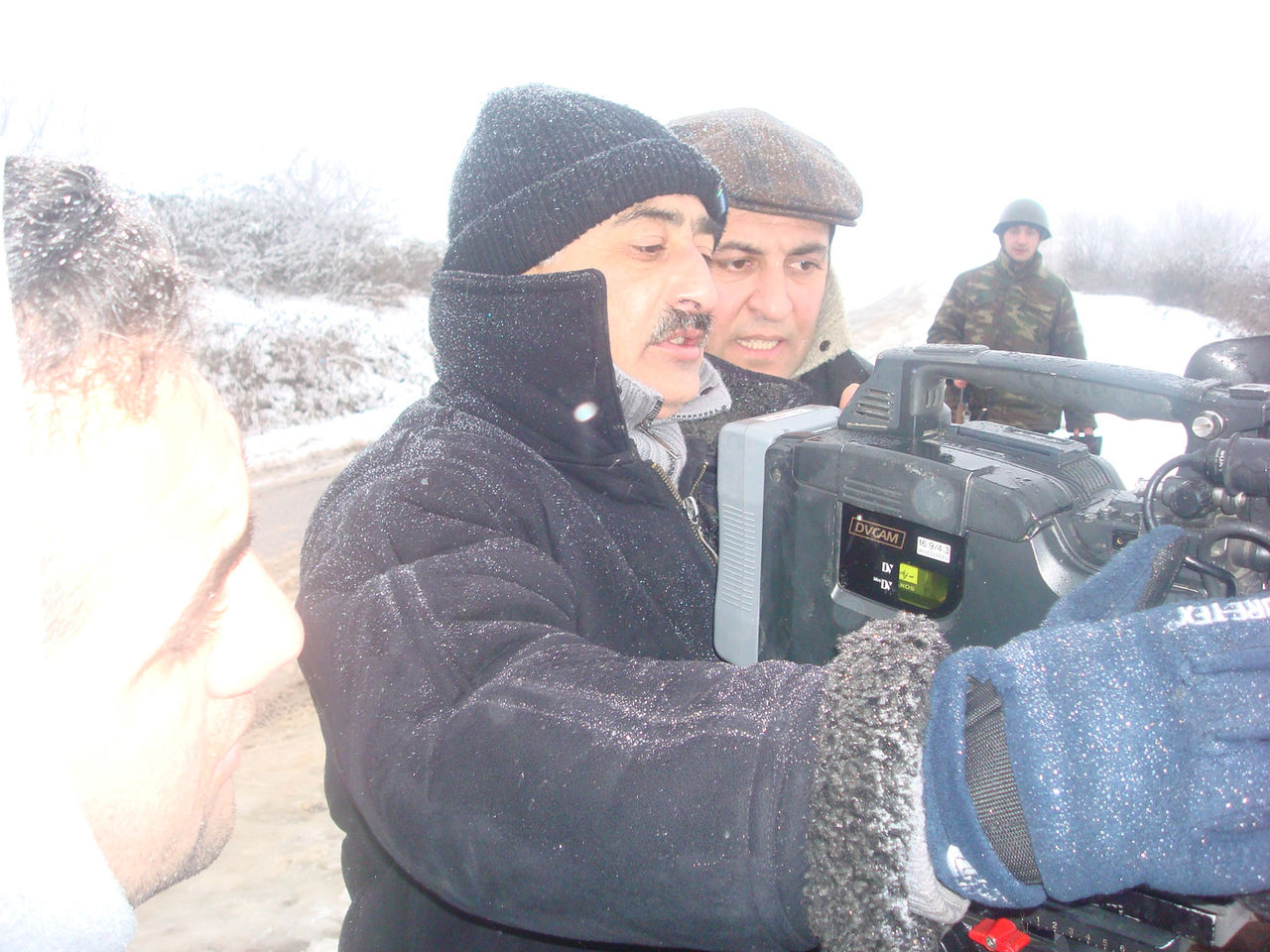
Rafig Hashimov in 2011

- 1996 - “The third side of the gramophone record” - documentary - screenwriter - with Vali Sayyadi
- 1997 - “A grain of sand” - documentary - screenwriter - with Elchin Musaoglu
- 1997 - “Dairy of the traveler” - documentary - screenwriter
- 1999 - “Magister dixit” - documentary - screenwriter
- 2000 - “The sun and the cloud” - documentary - screenwriter
- 2003 - "Phenomenon of two centuries" - documentary - screenwriter and director
- 2003 - “Light of my eyes” - documentary - screenwriter
- 2004 - "I call the stars with your name” - documentary - screenwriter and director
- 2006 - “Dreams of the reed city” - documentary - screenwriter - with Salim Babullaoglu
- 2006 - “Announcer” - documentary - screenwriter and director
- 2011 - “Unfinished dairy” - documentary - screenwriter (with Vali Sayyadi) and director
- 2013 - "Sattar's Azerbaijan" - documentary - screenwriter and director
- 2015 - "Water of Fireland" - documentary - screenwriter and director

== Stories ==
- ”Nest” - 1999
- ”One Hour” - 2010
- ”In the fear of the God” - 2005
- ”The Bridge” - 1999
- ”Qaraböcək” - 1999

== Essays ==
- “The Book” - 1995
- “A Word” - 1999
- “The History” - 2004
- “The Children” - 1995
- “To Zahra” - 2011

== Translations ==
- Hermann Hesse - “The world history” — translation from Russian language
- Hermann Hesse - “Shelter” — translation from Russian language
- Jorge Luis Borges - “The Book” — translation from Russian language
- Czeslaw Milosz — “A puppy on the roadside” — translation from Russian language

== Author programs ==
- "XX century" — 1995-1999
