= Hikmat Ziya =

Azerbaijani poet and writer (1929-1995)

Hikmat Ziya Hikmət Ziya
- Hikmət Ziya oğlu Əfəndiyev
- Born: May 13, 1929; Shaki, Azerbaijan, Azerbaijan SSR, TSFSR, USSR
- Died: August 2, 1995 (aged 66); Baku, Azerbaijan
- Education: Baku State University
- Occupations: poet, screenwriter, children's writer
- Writing career
- Pen name: Hikmat Afandiyev (ca. 1957-1960)
- Notable awards: Honored Art Worker of the Azerbaijan SSR Advanced Educationist

Hikmat Ziya oghlu Afandiyev (Azerbaijani: Hikmət Ziya oğlu Əfəndiyev, May 13, 1929–August 2, 1995) was an Azerbaijani poet, translator, and children's writer. He was a member of the Union of Azerbaijani Writers (1958), member of the Union of Journalists of Azerbaijan (1959), Advanced Educator (1978), Honored Art Worker of the Azerbaijan SSR (1986).

== Biography ==
=== Early life and education ===
Hikmat Ziya was born on May 13, 1929, in Shaki, Azerbaijan and grew up in Karabakh. After graduating from secondary school No. 1 in Aghdam, he studied at the journalism department of the Faculty of Philology of Baku State University (1947-1952).

=== Career ===
He worked as a literary worker, head of the literature and art department (1952-1969) in the Azerbaijan Pioneer newspaper editorial office, and as the head of the poetry department (1969-1984) and responsible secretary (1984) in the Goyarchin magazine editorial office.

He started his literary work in 1952 with his first poem "To Gogol" published in "Azerbaijan Pioneer" newspaper. The first satirical poems, as well as "My father's gift" (1957), "Is spring beautiful, or winter?" (1959), "Heart of a Fly" (1960) books were published under the signature of Hikmat Afandiyev. The plays "Trial" and "Twin Brothers" were staged. Music was composed for his librettos ("Grandmother's Tale", "Adventures of Two", "Pale Flowers") and poems. His works have been translated into the languages of the peoples of the post-Soviet states.

He participated in the children's and youth book weeks held in different cities of the country, as well as trips with the campaign train and jubilee celebrations. He was a member of the editorial board of Mozalan satirical film-magazineMozalan (film-magazine), All-Union Children's and Youth Literature Council, Azerbaijan Pioneer and Literaturny Azerbaijan magazines.

=== Awards ===
He was awarded the Honorary Decree of the Presidium of the Supreme Soviet of the Republic of Azerbaijan (1988) and the honorary title of Honored Art Worker of the Azerbaijan SSR (1986).

=== Death ===
Hikmat Ziya died on August 2, 1995, in Baku. After the poet's death, the "Hikmat Ziya" literary award was established in his name.
