= Bahram Askerov =

Azerbaijani physicist (1933-2014)

Askerov Bahram Mehrali oglu (5 October 1933 - 12 March 2014) was a physicist. He was born in the village of Ahmedabad, Tovuz district, Republic of Azerbaijan. In 1957 he graduated from the Physics and Mathematics Faculty of Baku State University. He went on to graduate study at Institute of Semiconductors in Saint Petersbourg, Russia, where he worked under the supervision of A.I.Anselm. In 1966 he was invited to teach at Baku State University, since 1971 he headed the chair for solid state Physics at the University. Works on the theory of solid state. He developed (together with A.I.Anselm) a quantum theory of thermomagnetic phenomena in semiconductors and metals. They proposed a method for calculating dissipative thermomagnetic currents in quantized magnetic fields, when the usual transport equation is not applicable. B.M.Askerov generalized the W.W.Adams and L.J.Goldstein's density matrix method, underlying the quantum theory of transverse thermomagnetic phenomena in semiconductors, to the case of the indium-antimonide-type conduction band. He elaborated a theory of electron transport phenomena in quantum wells, classical and size-quantized films, and superlattices.

== Books ==
1. Kinetic phenomena in semiconductors, Nauka, St.Petersbourg, Russia, 1970, 303p.
2. Electron kinetic phenomena in semiconductors, Nauka, Moscow, Russia, 1985, 320p.
3. Electron transport phenomena in semiconductors, World Scientific, Singapore, 1994, 394p.
4. Thermodynamics, Gibbs Method and Statistical Physics of Electron Gases, Springer, Heidelberg, Germany, 2010, 374p. (coauthor S.R.Figarova)
