= Marinus of Caesarea =

Roman soldier and Christian martyr

Saint Marinus of Caesarea

Martyr
- Born: 3rd century
- Died: 262; Caesarea, Palaestina
- Venerated in: Eastern Orthodox Church; Roman Catholic Church
- Canonized: Pre-congregation
- Feast: Mar 17, Aug 7, Dec 16 (Orthodoxy); March 3 (Catholicism)

Marinus of Caesarea (Greek: Μαρῖνος) was a Roman soldier and a Christian martyr.

== Life ==
Marinus was a Roman soldier stationed in Caesarea in Palestine. He was from a rich and noble family in this city, and being capable and conscientious, he had made a successful career in the Roman army. A soldier in a Roman legion, Marinus was promoted to the position of centurion. Before he was able to assume the post, a rival claimed that before a centurion could accept the post, he was to offer a sacrifice to the emperor, according to ancient law. Marinus, who until that point was a secret Christian, professed his true faith, and explained that it prevented him from offering this sacrifice. Marinus was then given three hours to change his decision.

He went to a local church to speak with the bishop, who went by the name of Theotecnus. Bishop Theotecnus led Marinus to the altar. He pointed to Marinus' sword and a Gospel book, and then asked which Marinus preferred. Without hesitation, Marinus chose the Gospel book with his right hand. The bishop told him: “Hold fast to God. By the strength he has given you, you can achieve the fruit of yours. Now go in peace”.

Marinus returned to the legion and refused to make the ritual sacrifice. He was then beheaded.

== Aftermath ==
The remains of Marinus were buried by a Roman senator, St Asterius of Caesarea, who was himself martyred. However, the evidence for this is not very reliable. Both saints have their feast day commemorated on March 3 in Catholicism.
