= Yusif Mammadov =

Azerbaijani academic (born 1950)

Yusif Mammadov (born 24 January 1950) is an Azerbaijani academic.

== Life ==
Yusif Mammadov was born in the village of Dastakert, in Sisyan, Western Azerbaijan on 24 January 1950. He graduated from secondary school in 1966 with a gold medal and entered the mechanics and mathematics faculty of Azerbaijan State University. Mammadov was appointed in the Department of equations of mathematical physics of Azerbaijan State University in 1971 after he graduated from university. He rose to from assistant to professor in this department. He worked as the first pro-rector of Baku State University in 2000-2004 and was an active member of Azerbaijan National Academy of Sciences (2017).

- He defended a nomination in 1974 and a thesis in 1990.
- He was awarded honorary title of "Honored Scientist" with president of Azerbaijan Haydar Aliyev's order in 2000.
- He was selected correspondent member of NASA in 2001.
- He is mathematician, expert in equations of mathematical physics and differential. He authored over 100 scientific publications.
- He trained 10 candidates of science and 1 doctor of science.
- He is member of Azerbaijan National Committee of ethics of scientific knowledge and technologies of UNESCO.
- He is chairman of expert council in mathematics and mechanics of Higher Attestation Commission under the President of the Republic of Azerbaijan.
- He worked as a rector of Azerbaijan State Pedagogical University from 21 April 2006 till 6 May 2016.
- He was appointed consultant of the Ministry of Education of Azerbaijan Republic since 7 May 2016.
