= Kamala Abiyeva =

Azerbaijani judge (born 1979)

- Kəmalə Abiyeva

Justice of the Supreme Court of Azerbaijan
- Incumbent
- Assumed office 2020

Personal details
- Born: 1979 (age 46–47)
- Education: Baku State University

Kamala Abiyeva (Azerbaijani: Kəmalə Abiyeva; born 1979) is an Azerbaijani judge. She has been serving as justice of the Supreme Court of Azerbaijan and chairwoman of its commercial chamber since 2020.

== Early life and education ==
Abiyeva got a degree in law from the Baku State University in 2000, where got a master's degree in civil and commercial law in 2002 and was PhD candidate in civil law between 2007 and 2011.

== Career ==
She began working in 2000 as a court clerk at the Economic Court, and between 2006 and 2011 she worked at the Supreme Court of Azerbaijan as an adviser, clerk and deputy judge. In 2011, she became a judge at the No. 2 Administrative and Economic Court in Baku, and in 2013 she began serving as a judge at the capital’s Court of Appeal, serving as vice-president between 2018 and 2020. In 2016 Abiyeva was one of the candidates for the post of judge of the European Court of Human Rights with respect to Azerbaijan.

Abiyeva became justice of the Supreme Court in May 2020, becoming chairwoman of its commercial chamber, after her nomination was approved by the National Assembly. In February 2026, she argued that AI can be useful for technical and support tasks, but that it should not replace judges in decision-making on matters with significant legal implications, due to the risks of algorithmic bias and the potential impact on the right to a fair trial.
