= Novella Jafaroghlu =

Azerbaijani poet

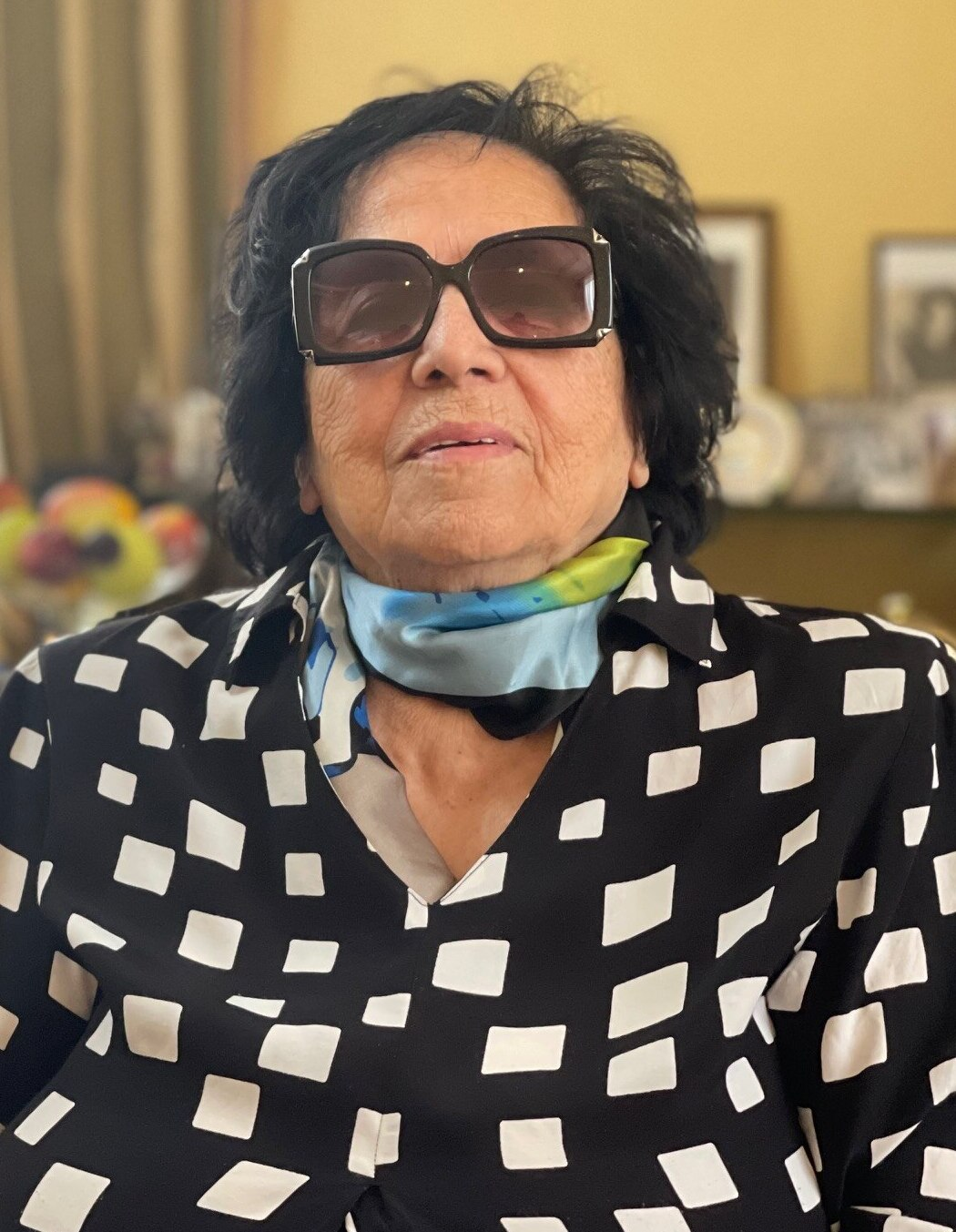
- Born: Novella Cəfəroğlu; 3 March 1941 (age 85); Nakhchivan, Azerbaijan
- Occupations: politic, writer
- Awards: Shohrat Order

Novella Jafaroghlu (Azerbaijani: Novella Cəfəroğlu; 3 March 1941) is an Azerbaijani chemist and politician, human rights defender, and president of the Dilara Aliyeva Society for the Protection of Women's Rights in Azerbaijan.

== Biography ==
Born in 1941, Novella Jafaroghlu obtained her university degree in 1963. After graduating, she began working as a chemical engineer in a central regional laboratory.

She held various positions at institutions such as the Southern Geological Expedition (Cənub Geoloji Ekspedisiyası), the General Directorate of Geology, and the Azerbaijan Non-Ferrous Metals Metallurgy Research Laboratory. In 1986, she began working at Baku State University.

In 1993, she was elected president of the Dilara Aliyeva Azerbaijan Society for the Protection of Women's Rights, which had been founded in 1989. She also took part in Azerbaijan's national liberation movement. In 2007, she was selected as a human rights expert for the Council of Europe. From 2014 onwards, she joined a human rights working group as well as the South Caucasus Human Rights Defenders Network, and helped found the South Caucasus Women's Congress.

She coordinated over 500 projects and published both academic articles and books. She was a member of the Azerbaijani Popular Front Party. During the split within the Azerbaijan Popular Front Party in 2000, she began campaigning with the "Originals" (or "Traditionalists") faction, led by Mirmahmud Miralioghlu.

== Awards ==
- 1998 : Marshall Scholarship, for her contribution to the development of an open society
- 2007 : International Women of Courage Award, U.S. State Department
- 2021 :
  Shohrat Order, for her significant contribution to the public life of the Republic of Azerbaijan
