= Magsud Mammadov (politician) =

Azerbaijani politician (1897–1938)

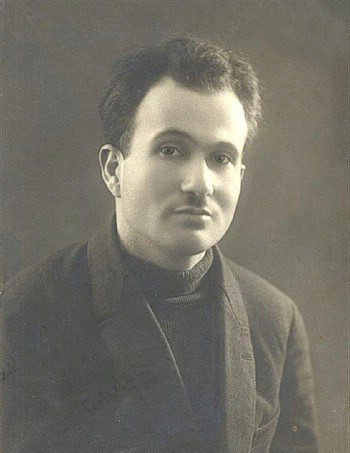
- Maqsud Mammadov.jpg
- Born: December 1897; Erivan, Russian Empire
- Died: 5 January 1938 (aged 40); Baku, Azerbaijan SSR, USSR
- Occupations: Politician and revolutionary

Magsud Mammad oglu Mammadov (Azerbaijani: Maqsud Məmməd oğlu Məmmədov; December 1897 – 5 January 1938) was an Azerbaijani statesman and politician. He served as the head of the Baku Administration of the People's Commissariat of Food (1920–1923), the Nakhchivan People's Commissariat of Finance (1925–1927), the Extraordinary People's Commissariat of Finance (1929–1930), the rector of the Azerbaijan State Institute (1929–1930), the People's Commissar of Education of the Azerbaijan SSR (1930–1931), the director of the Party History Institute at the Central Committee of the Communist Party of Azerbaijan (1933–1934), and prior to his arrest from July 29, 1937, to September 19, 1937, he was the director of the Azerbaijan State Publishing House.

== Life and career ==
Magsud Mammadov was born in 1897 in Erivan into a peasant family. Starting from 1920, Mammadov began to hold various leadership positions within the party. Before his appointment as a rector, he worked in the Ministry of Food of the Azerbaijani SSR, the Extraordinary Commissariat of Finance in Nakhchivan, and so on. In 1929, he was appointed as the rector of the Baku State University, and he served in this position for one year. From 1931, Mammadov held high positions as the People's Commissar of Education of the Azerbaijani SSR, and from 1931 to 1933, he was the Secretary of the Central Committee of the Communist (Bolshevik) Party of Azerbaijan.

With the appointment of Mir Jafar Baghirov as the leader of Azerbaijan, persecutions began against this distinguished statesman and scholar. He authored numerous articles from the perspective of Marxist–Leninist methodology, dialectical and historical materialisms, the resolution of national issues in the USSR, and more. After Mammadov's arrest and execution in 1937, these materials were destroyed and lost. Magsud Mammadov was executed by firing squad on January 5, 1938. He is buried in the city of Baku. He was posthumously rehabilitated in 1957.

== See also ==
- Great Purge

== Sources ==
- Hüseynov, Ə (2002). Hüseyn Heydər oğlu Həsənov // Məşhur biologiya alimləri. Baku: Maarif.
