= Aslan Aslanov =

Azerbaijani journalist

Aslan Ahmad Aslanov (Azerbaijani: Aslanov Aslan Əhməd oğlu) is an Azerbaijani journalist. From 2018 to 2022, he was chairman of the board of the Azerbaijan State News Agency (AZERTAC).

== Biography ==
From 12 December 2007, he has been a member of the executive board of the Organization of Asia-Pacific News Agencies (OANA). In September 2013, Aslan Aslanov was elected Vice President of OANA. He was elected member of the National Commission of the Republic of Azerbaijan for UNESCO by the decree of the Azerbaijani President. In 2016–2019, he was the president of the New Agencies World Congress and the Organization of Asia-Pacific News Agencies (OANA) From March 2018-December 2022, he was chairman of the board of Azerbaijan State News Agency.

== Awards ==
- "For Service to Motherland" 1st Class Order (2021)
- Jubilee medal "100th anniversary of Heydar Aliyev (1923-2023)" (2024)

== Books ==
- "Heydar Aliyev and AzerTAc". Baku, 2005.
- "From AzerTAc to AzerTAc: Difficult and Glorious Path". Baku, "Şərq-Qərb", 2008, 184 pages.
- "AzerTAc-90". Baku, 2011.
- "AzerTAc's place in the world information network: establishment history and development stages". Baku: "Azərnəşr", 2012, 224 pages.
- "Information provision of state policy". Baku, "Şərq-Qərb", 2013, 620 pages.
- Media and challenges of time. Baku, 2017, 477 pages.
