= Shaig Asgarov =

Azerbaijani economist (born 1966)

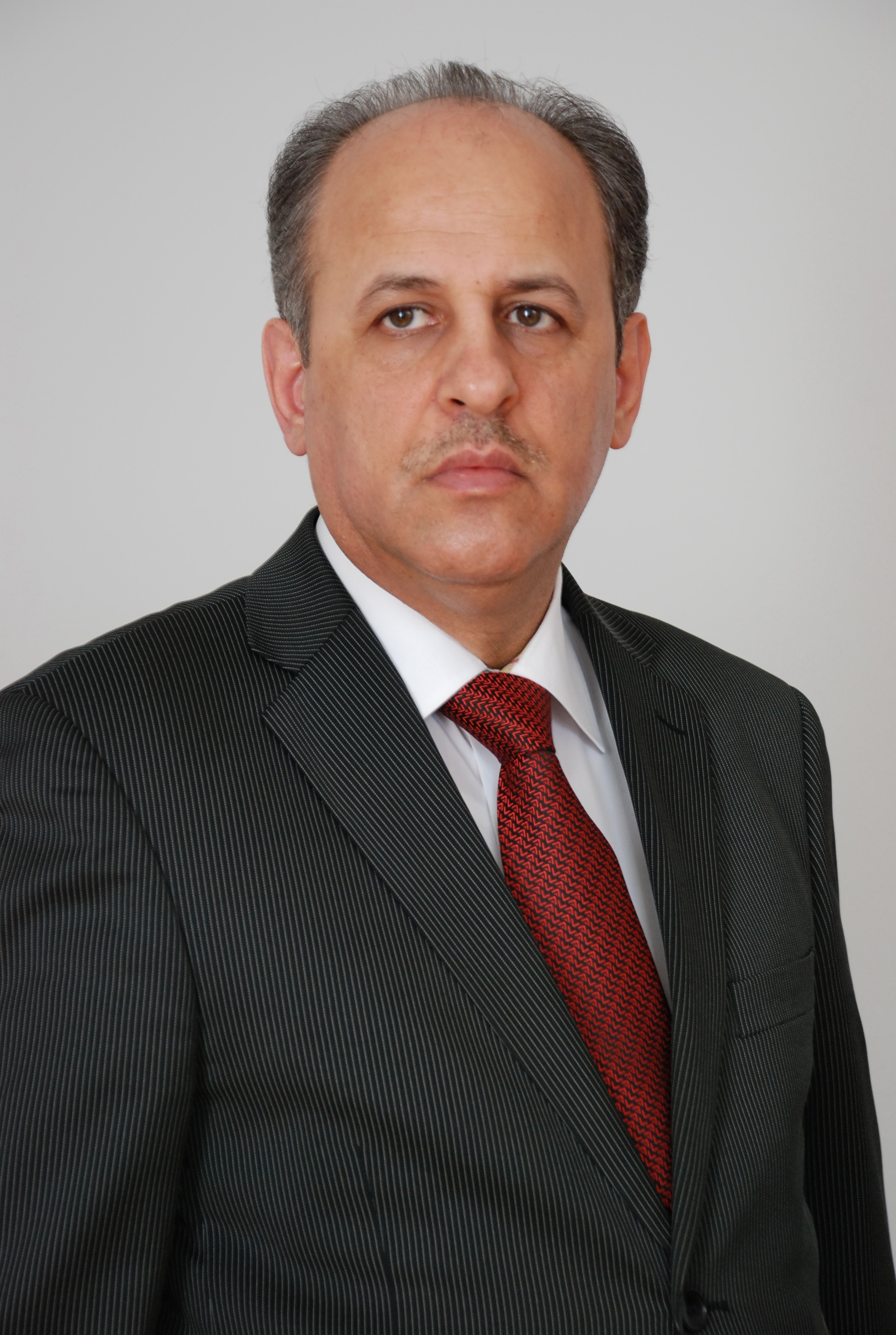
- Asgarov Shaig Ahad oglu
- Born: January 10, 1966 (age 60); Agsu
- Scientific career
- Fields: Economy
- Workplaces: Independent Trade Union of Azerbaijan Education Employees

Shaig Asgarov (born 10 January 1966, in Agsu, Azerbaijan) is an Azerbaijani academic and public figure.

== Biography ==
Upon leaving Agsu city high school No. 2 in 1993, he did his military service in the Far East in 1984–1986. He graduated from Journalism Department of Baku State University in 1992 and Foreign Economic Relations Building and Public Regulation Department of Azerbaijan State Economic University in 1997. In 2002, Asgarov successfully completed "Public and Municipality Administration" specialty at the Academy of Public Administration under the President of the Republic of Azerbaijan, and under the appointment of the Ministry of Education, the "Strategic Researches and Public Defense Administration" academic course of Azerbaijan Republic Armed Forces Military Academy.

Asgarov, at various years, worked as craftsman, corrector, correspondent, deputy secretary responsible, editor and editor-in-chief. From 2001 to 2006, he worked at Azerbaijan State Economic University as the Vice-Rector for educational issues. Asgarov has been the vice-president of Independent Trade Union of Azerbaijan Education Employees since 2006.

On January 10, 2007, Asgarov defended his dissertation paper on "Marketing study of advertising market in electronic information tools and its development perspectives" and obtained the scientific title, Candidate of Economic Sciences, under 10 July 2007 decision (protocol No 24-k) of Supreme Attestation Commission. He published 16 scientific works, including 14 articles, 1 manual (1 chapter) and 1 methodical aid on his dissertation theme.

For his efforts in promoting economic knowledge and the solution of socio-economic problems, his services in the economic and cultural revival, and his achievements in his personal activities, Asgarov has been awarded with "Azarbaycan bayragi" ("Flag of Azerbaijan") diploma, "Nurlu qalam ustasi” ("Bright master of pen") prize, honorary decrees of the Ministry of Education and the honorary title of "Progressive Education Worker". He has been awarded with "Taraqqi" ("Progress") medal by the order of the President of Azerbaijan Republic on February 4, 2013.

He is married with two children and a granddaughter.
