= Aydin Mammadov (politician) =

Azerbaijani politician (1932–2022)

Member of the Supreme Soviet of the Azerbaijan Soviet Socialist Republic
- In office 1971–1990

Personal details
- Born: Aydin Yusif oğlu Mammadov; 15 February 1932 Kvemo-Bolnisi, Transcaucasian SFSR, Soviet Union
- Died: 1 November 2022 (aged 90)
- Party: CPSU
- Education: Azerbaijan Technical University; Higher Party School at the Central Committee of the CPSU; Academy of Social Sciences of the Central Committee of CPSU
- Occupation: Trade unionist

Aydin Yusif oğlu Mammadov (Azerbaijani: Aydın Yusif oğlu Məmmədov; 15 February 1932 – 1 November 2022) was a Soviet and Azerbaijani politician. A member of the Communist Party, he served on the Supreme Soviet of the Azerbaijan Soviet Socialist Republic from 1971 to 1990.
