= Azerbaijan State News Agency =

News agency of the Republic of Azerbaijan

- Native name: Azərbaycan Dövlət İnformasiya Agentliyi
- Type: Agency
- Industry: News media
- Founded: 1 March 1920; 106 years ago
- Headquarters: Baku, Azerbaijan
- Key people: Vugar Aliyev
- Products: Wire service
- Owner: Government of Azerbaijan
- Website: azertag.az/en

Azerbaijan State News Agency (AZERTAC; Azerbaijani: Azərbaycan Dövlət İnformasiya Agentliyi, shortened as AZƏRTAC, from Azərbaycan Teleqraf Acentəsi, 'Telegraph Agency of Azerbaijan') is the official news agency of the Republic of Azerbaijan. From November 2022, Vugar Aliyev served as chairman of the board.

Along with the official state news, Azerbaijan State News Agency releases information on politics, economy, education, science, culture, health, sports and environment in eight languages such as Azerbaijani, Russian, English, French, German, Spanish, Arabic and Chinese.

== History ==
AZERTAC was established on 1 March 1920. Throughout the Soviet period, the agency held various names and after restoration of Azerbaijani independence in 1991, the agency name was restored. From 1995 to 2000, the agency was named State Telegraph Agency under Cabinet of Ministers, then was renamed to Azerbaijan State Telegraph Agency. On 26 February 2015, president Ilham Aliyev signed an order to rename Azerbaijan State Telegraph Agency to the Azerbaijan State Information Agency (AZERTAC).

== International cooperation ==
On 26 April 2012, AZERTAC and the Polish Press Agency signed a memorandum of understanding on cooperation. In September 2019, AZERTAC signed a memorandum of understanding on cooperation with the Israeli Tazpit Press Service. On 26 October 2019, AZERTAC and the Cuban agency Prensa Latina signed a memorandum of understanding on cooperation.

== Directors ==
- Gubad Gasimov (14 July 1921 – 1928)
- Mikhail Sinitsyn (1928–1930)
- Vasily Khaldeyev (1937–1938)
- Efim Gurvich (23 May 1942 – 1958)
- Hasai Vezirov (July 1958 – September 1962)
- Efim Gurvich (1962 – 26 December 1986)
- Rafig Zeynalov (26 December 1986 – 26 June 1988)
- Azad Sharifov (10 October 1988 – 3 April 1992)
- Fikret Sadygov (3 April 1992 – 6 August 1992)
- Vagif Rustamov (6 August 1992 – 26 August 1994)
- Shamil Shakhmamedov (22 January 2000 – 30 October 2002)
- Aslan Aslanov (30 October 2002 – 19 November 2022)
- Vugar Aliyev (since 28 November 2022)
