= Baku State University 100th anniversary medal =

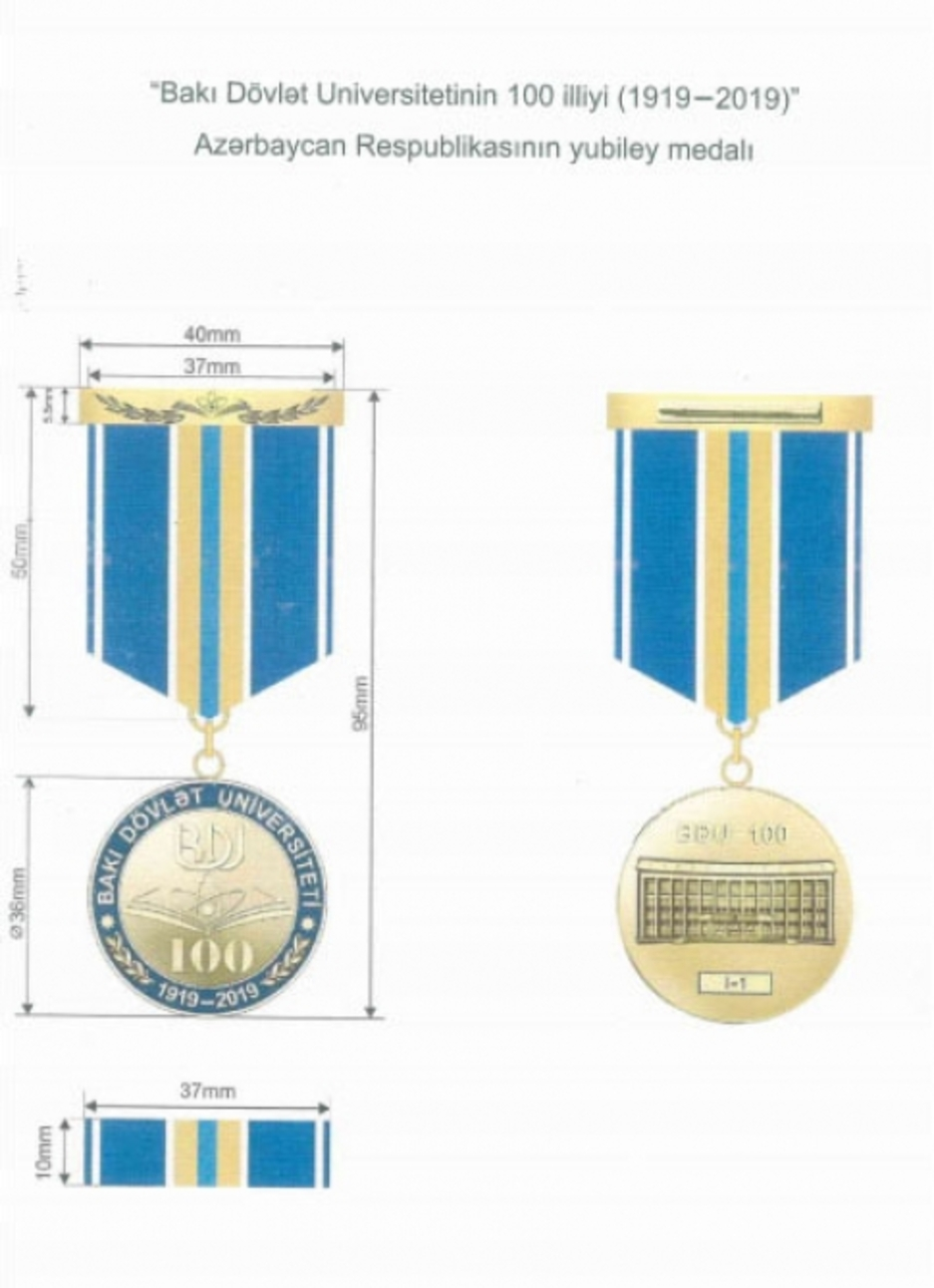
Baku State University 100th anniversary medal

The Jubilee medal of "100th Anniversary of Baku State University (1919-2019)” (Azerbaijani: Bakı Dövlət Universitetinin 100 illiyi (1919-2019)” Azərbaycan Respublikasının yubiley medalı) is a state award of Azerbaijan dedicated to the 100th anniversary of the establishment of Baku State University. The award was established on October 22, 2019 in accordance with the amendments to the “Law on Establishment of Orders and Medals of Azerbaijan”.

== Award description ==
The medal “100 years of Baku State University (1919-2019)” is a circular shaped plaque with a diameter of 36 mm. The plaque is made of bronze which covered by golden surface. The front of the medal is contoured with two circles. “Baku State University” is inscribed along the upper arc between the outer and inner circles, and “1919-2019” is written on the lower arch. There is an octagonal star on the left and right sides of the inscription. Wreathes with ears are inscribed on the left and right sites of the “1919-2019” along the lower arch. In the center of the inner circle of the medal, there is a composite consisting of a book (symbolizing education) and an atom (symbolizing science) description. “BDU” (abbreviation of Baku State University (BSU) in Azerbaijani) is engraved above the book-atomic composition, while “100” is below the composition.

The octagonal star, the outline of the circle, the atom and the book images, the words and figures, the "BSU" logo and the wreathes are gold color. Between the two circles, the arch is dark blue, the background of the inner circle is gold.

In the upper part of the reverse side of the medal, the words “BDU-100” are embed, also the sketch of the main building of the BSU is engraved in the center.

=== Elements of the medal ===
The circular plaque is attached to the five-pointed moire ribbon on which the colors dark blue, white and gold vertical stripes are illustrated. A bronze rectangular plate of 37mm x 5.5mm featuring the composition of a book and an atomic description, as well as the wreathes is attached to the top of the striped ribbon. The plate is covered with a golden layer.

== Criteria for award ==
The Jubilee Medal is awarded to:

BSU employees, alumni, veterans who

- have gained outstanding achievements in the fields of science and education
- have made significant contribution to the development of the fields of science and education
- are actively involved in socio-cultural development

The citizens of Azerbaijan, foreigners and stateless persons who

- have special services in the implementation of the state policy in the field of science, education and international cooperation
- have special services in the progress of the BSU.

== Awarding body ==
The awarding body is defined in accordance with Article 23, Clause 23 (Powers of the President) of the Constitution of Azerbaijan. The Minister of Education of Azerbaijan has been authorized to award the anniversary medal based on the Presidential decree dated 22 October 2019.

The Education Minister of Azerbaijan Jeyhun Bayramov awarded 113 academic staff members of Baku State University on November 25ç 2019.

== The way of wearing ==
This medal is worn on the left side of the chest, if there is any other orders and medals of Azerbaijan, it is placed after them.

== See also ==
- Orders, decorations, and medals of Azerbaijan
- National symbols of Azerbaijan
