= Böyük =

Böyük or Boyuk may refer to:

- Böyük Şamlıq (also, Boyuk Shamlyg) is a village in the Tovuz District of Azerbaijan
- Böyük Əmili (also, Boyuk Emili) is a village and municipality in the Qabala District of Azerbaijan
- Böyük Alatəmir (also, Boyuk Alatemir, Boyuk Alatemir, and Boyuk-Alateymur) is a village and municipality in the Qakh District of Azerbaijan
- Böyük Bəhmənli (also, Boyuk Bahmanli and Boyuk-Bahmanli) is a village and most populous municipality in the Fizuli District of Azerbaijan
- Böyük Dəhnə (also, Boyuk Dahna, Boyuk Dehne, Boyuk-Dahna, Boyuk-Dehne, and Boyuk Dahne) is a village and municipality in the Shaki District of Azerbaijan
- Böyük Dəkkə (also, Boyuk Dakka) is a village in the Zardab District of Azerbaijan
- Böyük Göyüşlü (also, Boyuk Goyushlu) is a village and municipality in the Barda District of Azerbaijan
- Böyük Galadərəsi (also, Boyukgaladeresi, Boyuk Galadarasi, Mets Shen, Metsgaladeresi, and Metsgaladarasi) is a village in the Shusha District of Azerbaijan
- Böyük Gilətağ (also, Boyuk Gilatagh and Boyuk Giletagh) is a village in the Zangilan District of Azerbaijan
- Böyük Həmyə (also, Arab Ham’ya and Boyuk Ham’ya) is a village and municipality in the Siazan District of Azerbaijan
- Böyük Külatan (also, Boyuk Kulatan, Boyuk Kolatan, and Kulatan) is a village in the Masally District of Azerbaijan
- Böyük Kəhrizli (also, Boyuk Kahrizli, Boyuk-Karizli, and Kahrizli-Nasirbeyli) is a village and municipality in the Aghjabadi District of Azerbaijan
- Böyük Kəngərli (also, Boyuk Kengerli, and Boyuk-Kengerli) is a village and municipality in the Kurdamir District of Azerbaijan
- Böyük Kəsik (formerly, V.İ.Lenin) is a village and municipality in the Aghstafa District of Azerbaijan
- Böyük Mərcanlı (also, Boyuk Marjanly) is a village in the Jabrayil District of Azerbaijan
- Böyük Muruq (also, Boyuk Murug and Boyuk-Murug) is a village and municipality in the Qusar District of Azerbaijan
- Böyük Oyun (English: "The Great Game") is an Azerbaijani football rivalry involving two of the most successful clubs in Azerbaijan
- Böyük Pirəli (also, Boyuk Pirali, and Boyuk-Pirali) is a village and municipality in the Qabala District of Azerbaijan
- Böyük Qışlaq (also, Böyükqışlaq, Boyuk Gyshlag, and Boyug-Gyshlag) is a village and municipality in the Tovuz District of Azerbaijan
- Böyük Qəcər (also, Boyuk Gajar and Böyük Qacar) is a village and municipality in the Barda District of Azerbaijan
- Böyük Qaramurad (also, Boyuk Garamurad) is a village and municipality in the Gadabay District of Azerbaijan
- Böyük Söyüdlü (also, Boyuk Soyudlyu, Boyuk-Seyudlu, and Boyuk-Sogutlu) is a village and municipality in the Oghuz District of Azerbaijan
- Böyük Tağlar (also, Mets T’aghlar, Mets Taghk, and Metstaghlar) is a village in the Khojavend District of Azerbaijan
- Böyük Xınıslı, a village and municipality in the Shamakhi Rayon of Azerbaijan
- Böyük Xoşdarlı (also, Boyuk Khoshdarly), a village in the municipality of Yanıqlı in the Tovuz District of Azerbaijan
- Böyük Xocavar (also, Boyuk Khojavar), a village and municipality in the Masally District of Azerbaijan
- Boyuk Alagol (Azerbaijani: Böyük Alagöl) is a lake of Azerbaijan
- Boyuk Khanlu, a village in the Ardabil Province of Iran
- Boyuk Shor Highway (Azerbaijani: Böyük Şor yolu) is a highway in Baku, Azerbaijan
- Qurudərə, Böyük Qaramurad (also, Kurudere) is a village in the Gadabay District of Azerbaijan
