= Qaravəlli =

Qaravəlli or Qaravəlili or Karavelli or Kara-Vali or Kora-Velly may refer to:

- Karavelli, Neftchala, Azerbaijan
- Qaravəlli, Aghjabadi, Azerbaijan
- Qaravəlli, Agsu, Azerbaijan
- Qaravəlli, Ismailli, Azerbaijan
- Qaravəlli, Shamakhi, Azerbaijan
- Qaravəlli, Zardab, Azerbaijan
- Qaravəlili, Balakan, Azerbaijan
- Qaravəlili, Imishli, Azerbaijan
- Qarah Vali, Iran
