= Pir Ali =

Pir Ali or Pirali may refer to:

== Persons ==
- Pir Ali (Yezidi saint)

== Places ==
- Pir Ali, Ardabil
- Pir Ali, Chaharmahal and Bakhtiari
- Pirali, Fars
- Pir Ali, Khuzestan
- Pir Ali, North Khorasan
- Pirali, West Azerbaijan
- Pirali, Horasan

== See also ==
- Böyük Pirəli
- Ali Pir
