= Şahsevən =

Şahsevən or Shakhsevan may refer to:

- Şahsevən, Aghjabadi, Azerbaijan
- Şahsevən, Kurdamir, Azerbaijan
- Şahsevən Təzəkənd, Azerbaijan
- Shakhsevan Tretye, Azerbaijan
- Birinci Şahsevən, Azerbaijan
- İkinci Şahsevən, Azerbaijan
