= Qajar (disambiguation) =

Qajar Iran was an Iranian empire ruled by the Qajar dynasty.

There are some derived meanings:

- Qajar dynasty in Iran
  - Qajar art
- Qajar (tribe), also spelled Ghajars, Kadjars, Kajars, Kadzhars, Cadzhars, Qachars and so on; in Azerbaijani: Qacar, an Oghuz Turkic people

== Geography ==
Qəcər, Qacar, Qajar, Kajar or Kadzhar may refer to the following:

=== Azerbaijan ===
- Bala Qəcər
- Böyük Qəcər
- Kadzhar, Agsu
- Qacar, Fizuli
- Qacar Zeyid

=== Iran ===
- Qajar, Khuzestan, Iran
- Qajar, Zanjan, Iran
- Qajar-e Takht Rostam, Iran

== Vehicles ==
- Renault Kadjar
