= Söyüdlü =

Söyüdlü or Sëyudlyu or Seyudlu or Segyutlyu or Sogyutlyu or Seyudlyu or Sogyultlu may refer to:

- Sarnaghbyur, Armenia
- Söyüdlü, Gadabay, Azerbaijan
- Söyüdlü, Jalilabad, Azerbaijan
- Söyüdlü, Jabrayil, Azerbaijan
- Bala Söyüdlü, Azerbaijan
- Böyük Söyüdlü, Azerbaijan
