= Şotlanlı =

Şotlanlı may refer to:

- Şotlanlı, Agdam, Azerbaijan
- Şotlanlı, Aghjabadi, Azerbaijan
- Şotlanlı, Qubadli, Azerbaijan
