= İmamqulubəyli =

İmamqulubəyli or Imamkulubeyli or Imankulubeyli or İmanqulubəyli may refer to:

- İmamqulubəyli, Agdam, Azerbaijan
- İmamqulubəyli (village), Agdam, Azerbaijan
- İmamqulubəyli, Aghjabadi, Azerbaijan
- İmamqulubəyli, Barda, Azerbaijan
