= Əmili =

Əmili or Emili or Amili may refer to:

- Böyük Əmili, Azerbaijan
- Kiçik Əmili, Azerbaijan
- Al-'Amili
