= Khudadat bey Malik-Aslanov =

Azerbaijani politician and university professor

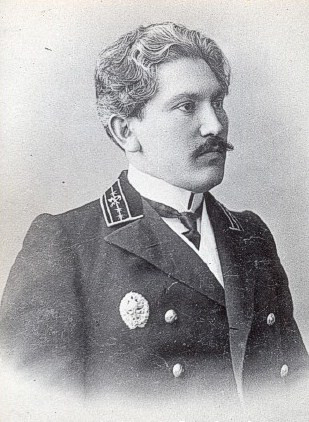

Minister of Railway Communications of the Democratic Republic of Azerbaijan
- In office 28 May 1918 – 28 April 1920

Head of the Department of Railway Communications of the Azerbaijan SSR Supreme Soviet of the National Economy
- In office 1921–1933

Personal details
- Born: April 1879 Taynaq, Shusha uezd, Russian Empire
- Died: 23 July 1935 (aged 56) Baku, Azerbaijan SSR
- Party: Independent; Azerbaijan Communist Party
- Spouse: Maria Malik-Aslanova
- Occupation: Railwayman, Ph.D.

Khudadat bey Agha bey oghlu Malik-Aslanov (Azerbaijani: خداداد بگ آقا بگ اوغلی ملک اصلانوف, Xudadat bəy Ağa bəy oğlu Məlik-Aslanov) (April 1879 – 23 July 1935) was an Azerbaijani engineer, politician and university professor.

== Early life ==
Khudadat Malik-Aslanov was born to the wealthy Malik-Aslanov family in the village of Taynaq in Shusha Uyezd of the Elisabethpol Governorate of the Russian Empire (now in Azerbaijan's Aghjabadi District). After graduation from the Shusha Realschule in 1899, he was sponsored by philanthropist Zeynalabdin Taghiyev to enter the Saint Petersburg Institute of Railway Transportation. He graduated from the institute with honours in 1904. He then was sent to work in the pioneering of the Saint Petersburg – Vologda railway. In 1905 Malik-Aslanov was assigned a position in the Transcaucasian Railway Department in Tiflis, of which he soon became the chairman. He earned a Ph.D. degree after publishing more than 10 works on railway communications.

== Career in the Democratic Republic of Azerbaijan ==
After the February Revolution of 1917, the Russian Provisional Government appointed Malik-Aslanov Commissioner for the Communications of Transcaucasia. In April 1918 he became Minister of Railway Communications of the newly established and short-lived Transcaucasian Democratic Federative Republic seated in Tiflis. After the dissolution of the federation in May 1918 Malik-Aslanov held the same post in the Azerbaijan Democratic Republic in four of the five cabinets. He was one of the members of the Azerbaijani National Council who signed the Declaration of Independence of 28 May 1918 proclaiming Azerbaijan's sovereignty, and became one of Members of Parliament of the newly founded state. In 1919 Malik-Aslanov was also selected to be member of the State Committee of Defense and the special committee for Romanization of the Azerbaijani alphabet. He initiated the establishment of a bilingual Azerbaijani-Russian institution of higher education to train specialists in the field of railway communications (later reorganized into the Baku College of Railway Transportation). He did not join any party throughout his pre-Soviet political career.

== Career in Soviet Azerbaijan ==
From 1921 to 1930 Khudadat bey Malik-Aslanov served as Dean of the Faculty of Building Engineering at the Azerbaijan Polytechnic Institute. He was also Head of the Department of Railway Communications of Azerbaijan's Supreme Soviet of the National Economy. Malik-Aslanov assisted in the building of a railway from Baku to Julfa and in the introduction of the first elektrichka in the Soviet Union, which took place in Azerbaijan. In 1929, he proposed establishing metro system in Baku (the project was fulfilled in 1967).

== Family ==
In 1906 Khudadat bey Malik-Aslanov married Maria Alexandrova, the daughter of his landlord in Saint Petersburg. They did not have children of their own and adopted the sons of Malik-Aslanov's sister Khurshid.

== Arrest and death ==
Similar to many of those involved in the political affairs of the Azerbaijan Democratic Republic in 1918–1920, Malik-Aslanov was subject to Stalinist persecutions. He was arrested for the first time in 1930 but was released upon Mir Jafar Baghirov's request in 1933. In August 1934 Malik-Aslanov was arrested again on the grounds of not having served his 5-year sentence. In 1935 he died in the Bailov prison. According to the official version, Malik-Aslanov died of natural causes. His family believed he was done away with by someone named Gerasimov. Malik-Aslanov's body was never shown to his family and was buried in a mass grave in the Chemberekend Cemetery. He was officially exonerated in 1959.
