= Kəhrizli =

Kəhrizli or Kyagrizli or Khagrizli may refer to:

- Bala Kəhrizli, Azerbaijan
- Böyük Kəhrizli, Azerbaijan
- Kəhrizli, Goranboy, Azerbaijan
