= Qarah Vali =

Qarah Vali or Qareh Vali (Persian: قره ولي), also rendered as Qaravali or Qarawali, may refer to:

- Qarah Vali, Ardabil, Iran
- Qarah Vali, East Azerbaijan, Iran
- Qarah Vali, Kermanshah, Iran
- Qareh Vali, Zanjan, Iran

== See also ==
- Qaravəlli (disambiguation), places in Azerbaijan
