= Həmyə =

Həmyə or Gam’ya may refer to:

- Balaca Həmyə, Azerbaijan
- Böyük Həmyə, Azerbaijan
