= Göyüşlü =

Göyüşlü or Gëyushlyu may refer to:

- Bala Göyüşlü, Azerbaijan
- Böyük Göyüşlü, Azerbaijan
