= Pərioğlular =

Pərioğlular or Perioglular or Peioglylar or Parioglylar may refer to:

- Pərioğlular, Agdam, Azerbaijan
- Pərioğlular, Aghjabadi, Azerbaijan
