= Xocavar =

Xocavar may refer to:

- Binə Xocavar, Azerbaijan
- Böyük Xocavar, Azerbaijan
