= Nəcəfqulubəyli =

Nəcəfqulubəyli or Nəcəfqulubəli or Nadzhafkulubeyli or Nəcəfqulubəjli or Nadzhafkulibeyli or Nadzhafulibeyli may refer to:

- Nəcəfqulubəyli, Aghjabadi, Azerbaijan
- Nəcəfqulubəyli, Barda, Azerbaijan
