= Qafarli =

Qafarli may refer to:

- Qafarlı, Azerbaijan
- Qəfərli, Azerbaijan
