= Kürdlər =

Kürdlər or Kyurtlar or Kurdlyar may refer to:

- Kürdlər, Aghjabadi, Azerbaijan
- Kürdlər, Agdam, Azerbaijan
- Kürdlər, Fizuli, Azerbaijan
- Kürdlər, Jalilabad, Azerbaijan
- Kürdlər, Jabrayil, Azerbaijan
- Qurdlar (disambiguation), Azerbaijan
