= Ağabəyli =

Ağabəyli or Ağabeyli or Agabeyli or Agabayli or Agebeyli may refer to:

- Ağabəyli, Aghjabadi, Azerbaijan
- Ağabəyli, Agsu, Azerbaijan
