= Bəhmənli =

Bəhmənli or Bekhmenli or Bekhmanli may refer to:

- Bala Bəhmənli, Azerbaijan
- Böyük Bəhmənli, Azerbaijan
