= Qurdlar =

Qurdlar or Kyurdlyar or Kurtlar may refer to:

- Kürdlər (disambiguation), Azerbaijan
- Qurdlar, Agdam, Azerbaijan
- Qurdlar, Barda, Azerbaijan
- Kurtlar, Acıpayam
- Kurtlar, Dursunbey, Turkey
- Kurtlar, Mudurnu, Turkey
