= Anar Isgandarov =

Azerbaijani historian (born 1956)

- Azerbaijani: Anar İsgəndərov
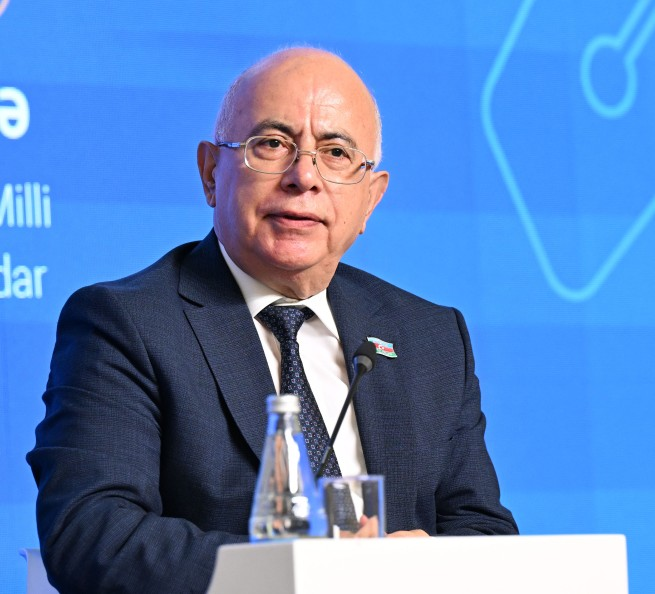
- Born: 10 January 1956 (age 70); Boyuk Kolatan, Masally District, Azerbaijan SSR, Soviet Union
- Citizenship: Azerbaijan
- Awards: Honorary Diploma of President (Azerbaijan); Taraggi; For service to the Fatherland Order; Azerbaijan Democratic Republic 100th anniversary medal Baku State University 100th anniversary medal Shohrat Order
- Scientific career
- Fields: History

Anar Jamal oghlu Isgandarov (Azerbaijani: Anar Camal oğlu İsgəndərov) Azerbaijani historian, Doctor of historical sciences, professor and Chief of the department of "Source Study, Historiography and Methods" of Baku State University., Deputy of the Milli Mejlis of Azerbaijan of the VI, VII convocations (from 2020).

== Early life and education ==
Anar Isgandarov was born in the Boyuk Kolatan village of the Masally District in 1956. From 1973 to 1978, he studied at and graduated with honors from the Department of History, Baku State University.

== Career ==
From 1978 to 1981. he worked as a history teacher in the Masally district, Azerbaijan. From 1982 to 1984, he worked as the Head of the Cabinet at the Department of Philosophy of the Azerbaijan State Oil Academy. From 1984 to 1999, he worked at BSU in the Department of Source Studies, Historiography and Methods as a senior laboratory assistant, teacher, senior teacher and assistant professor. Beginning in1999 he began serving as head of the department.

He lectures and conducts seminars in: “Historiography of the history of Azerbaijan”; "Sources of the history of Azerbaijan"; “Actual problems of historical science”; "Methodological problems of historical research."

In 1989, he defended his thesis on the topic: “Historiography, the establishment and strengthening of Soviet power in Azerbaijan".

In 2004, he defended his doctoral dissertation on the topic: “Historiography of the problem of the genocide of the Turks in Azerbaijan 1917-1918.”

== Awards ==
On January 11, 2016, he was awarded the Order for Service to the Fatherland, III degree, for his services in the study of the period of the Azerbaijan Democratic Republic.

On January 9, 2026, he was awarded the Order of "Glory" for his fruitful activity in the socio-political life of the Republic of Azerbaijan.

== Selected works ==
- Historiography of March genocide 1918. Baku, 1997
- Azerbaijan People Republic. Baku, 2003
- Azerbaijan People Republic. (bibliography). Baku, 2003
- Historiography of the problem of Turkish-Muslim genocide in Azerbaijan in 1918–1920. Baku, 2006
- The Caucasian İslamic Army and The Salvation of Azerbaijan, Baku, Turkhan NPB publisher, 2019, p. 120

== Awards ==
- Honorary Diploma of President (Azerbaijan)
- Taraggi Medal
- For service to the Fatherland Order
- Azerbaijan Democratic Republic 100th anniversary medal
- Baku State University 100th anniversary medal
- Shohrat Order
