= Şahsevən Təzəkənd =

Shahseven Tazakend
- Municipality
- Azerbaijani: Şahsevən Təzəkənd
- Location within Azerbaijan Location within Karabakh Economic Region
- Coordinates: 40°00′50″N 47°14′24″E
- Country: Azerbaijan
- District: Aghjabadi

Population
  - Total: 651
- Time zone: UTC+4 (AZT)
  - Summer (DST): UTC+5 (AZT)

Şahsevən Təzəkənd (also, Shahseven Tazakend and Tazakend) is a village and municipality in the Aghjabadi District of Azerbaijan. It has a population of 651. It is closest to the villages of Minakhorlu and Mughanly.
