= Qajariyeh =

Qajariyeh (Persian: قجريه) may refer to:

- Qajariyeh 1, Khuzestan Province
- Qajariyeh 2, Khuzestan Province
- Qajariyeh, Tehran
