= Qaradolaq =

Qaradolaq may refer to:

- Qaradolaq, Aghjabadi, Azerbaijan
- Qaradolaq, Qakh, Azerbaijan
