= Şatırlı =

Şatırlı or Shatyrly may refer to:

- Şatırlı, Barda, Azerbaijan
- Şatırlı, Jalilabad, Azerbaijan
