= Otuzikilər =

- Municipality
- Location within Azerbaijan Location within Karabakh Economic Region
- Coordinates: 40°23′08″N 47°14′00″E
- Country: Azerbaijan
- Rayon: Barda

Population
  - Total: 2,280
- Time zone: UTC+4 (AZT)
  - Summer (DST): UTC+5 (AZT)

Otuzikilər (also, Otuzikilyar) is a village and municipality in the Barda Rayon of Azerbaijan. It has a population of 2,280.
