= Seviyan =

Seviyan may refer to:

- Seviyan, Azerbaijan
- Seviyan (food)
