= Şərəfxanlı =

- Municipality
- Location within Azerbaijan Location within Karabakh Economic Region
- Coordinates: 40°03′09″N 47°10′39″E
- Country: Azerbaijan
- Rayon: Aghjabadi

Population
  - Total: 725
- Time zone: UTC+4 (AZT)
  - Summer (DST): UTC+5 (AZT)

Şərəfxanlı (also known as Şərəfxanli and Sharafkhanly) is a village and municipality in the Aghjabadi Rayon of Azerbaijan. It has a population of 725.
