= Mirzəxan Qaraqoyunlu =

- Municipality
- Location within Azerbaijan Location within Karabakh Economic Region
- Coordinates: 40°23′N 47°11′E
- Country: Azerbaijan
- Rayon: Barda

Population
  - Total: 525
- Time zone: UTC+4 (AZT)
  - Summer (DST): UTC+5 (AZT)

Mirzəxan Qaraqoyunlu (also, Mirzakhankarakoyunlu) is a village and municipality in the Barda Rayon of Azerbaijan. It has a population of 525.
