= Mollaisalar =

- Municipality
- Location within Azerbaijan Location within Karabakh Economic Region
- Coordinates: 40°22′28″N 47°13′36″E
- Country: Azerbaijan
- Rayon: Barda

Population
  - Total: 719
- Time zone: UTC+4 (AZT)
  - Summer (DST): UTC+5 (AZT)

Mollaisalar is a village and municipality in the Barda Rayon of Azerbaijan. It has a population of 719.
