= Gərənə =

- Municipality
- Location within Azerbaijan Location within Karabakh Economic Region
- Coordinates: 40°25′54″N 47°06′31″E
- Country: Azerbaijan
- Rayon: Barda

Population
  - Total: 1,718
- Time zone: UTC+4 (AZT)
  - Summer (DST): UTC+5 (AZT)

Gərənə (also, Gërana and Kyarana) is a village and municipality in the Barda Rayon of Azerbaijan. It has a population of 1,718.
