= Şahmalılar =

- Municipality
- Location within Azerbaijan Location within Karabakh Economic Region
- Coordinates: 40°03′22″N 47°10′27″E
- Country: Azerbaijan
- Rayon: Aghjabadi

Population
  - Total: 227
- Time zone: UTC+4 (AZT)
  - Summer (DST): UTC+5 (AZT)

Şahmalılar (also, Şahmallar, Shakhmalar, Shakhmallar, and Shakkmalar) is a village and the least populous municipality in the Aghjabadi Rayon of Azerbaijan. It has a population of 227.
