= Köbərkənd =

- Municipality
- Location within Azerbaijan Location within Karabakh Economic Region
- Coordinates: 40°22′51″N 47°11′10″E
- Country: Azerbaijan
- Rayon: Barda

Population
  - Total: 570
- Time zone: UTC+4 (AZT)
  - Summer (DST): UTC+5 (AZT)

Köbərkənd (also, Kəbərkənd, Keberkend, and Kiberkend) is a village and municipality in the Barda Rayon of Azerbaijan. It has a population of 570.
