= Xanxanımlı =

- Municipality
- Location within Azerbaijan Location within Karabakh Economic Region
- Coordinates: 40°16′21″N 47°10′38″E
- Country: Azerbaijan
- Rayon: Barda

Population
  - Total: 359
- Time zone: UTC+4 (AZT)
  - Summer (DST): UTC+5 (AZT)

Xanxanımlı (also, Khankhanymly) is a village and municipality in the Barda Rayon of Azerbaijan. It has a population of 359.
