= Xanağalı =

- Municipality
- Location within Azerbaijan Location within Karabakh Economic Region
- Coordinates: 40°16′28″N 47°10′39″E
- Country: Azerbaijan
- Rayon: Barda

Population
  - Total: 565
- Time zone: UTC+4 (AZT)
  - Summer (DST): UTC+5 (AZT)

Xanağalı (also, Xanagahlı and Khanagaly) is a village and municipality in the Barda Rayon of Azerbaijan. It has a population of 565.
