= Agalarbeyli =

- Location within Azerbaijan Location within Karabakh Economic Region
- Coordinates: 40°03′29″N 47°06′41″E
- Country: Azerbaijan
- Rayon: Aghjabadi
- Elevation: 169 m (554 ft)
- Time zone: UTC+4 (AZT)
  - Summer (DST): UTC+5 (AZT)

Agalarbeyli is a village in the Aghjabadi Rayon of Azerbaijan.
