= Tağılar =

Tağılar or Tagilar Taghilar or Taghylar or Taglar may refer to:

- Tağılar, Barda, a village in the Barda District of Azerbaijan
- Tağılar, Kalbajar, a village in the Kalbajar District of Azerbaijan
