= Aşağı Avşar =

Coordinates: 40.04636°N 47.41725°E

Aşağı Avşar is a village and municipality in the Aghjabadi Rayon of Azerbaijan. It has a population of 1,900.
