= Xanərəb =

- Municipality
- Location within Azerbaijan Location within Karabakh Economic Region
- Coordinates: 40°13′50″N 47°10′51″E
- Country: Azerbaijan
- Rayon: Barda

Population
  - Total: 2,079
- Time zone: UTC+4 (AZT)
  - Summer (DST): UTC+5 (AZT)

Xanərəb (also, Khanarab) is a village and municipality in the Barda Rayon of Azerbaijan. It has a population of 2,079.
