= Hüsülü =

Hüsülü or Gusyulyu or Gyusyulu or Gyusyulyu may refer to:

- Hüsülü, Aghjabadi, Azerbaijan
- Hüsülü, Lachin, Azerbaijan
