= Mirzalıbəyli =

- Municipality
- Location within Azerbaijan Location within Karabakh Economic Region
- Coordinates: 40°23′N 47°09′E
- Country: Azerbaijan
- Rayon: Barda

Population
  - Total: 808
- Time zone: UTC+4 (AZT)
  - Summer (DST): UTC+5 (AZT)

Mirzalıbəyli (also, Mirzalybeyli) is a village and municipality in the Barda Rayon of Azerbaijan. It has a population of 808.
