= Mirzəhaqverdili =

- Municipality
- Location within Azerbaijan Location within Karabakh Economic Region
- Coordinates: 39°58′55″N 47°06′38″E
- Country: Azerbaijan
- Rayon: Aghjabadi

Population
  - Total: 466
- Time zone: UTC+4 (AZT)
  - Summer (DST): UTC+5 (AZT)

Mirzəhaqverdili (also known as Mirzaakhverdili and Mirza-Akhverdly) is a village and municipality in the Aghjabadi Rayon of Azerbaijan. It has a population of 466.
