= Məşədiibişli =

- Municipality
- Location within Azerbaijan Location within Karabakh Economic Region
- Coordinates: 40°22′48″N 47°21′01″E
- Country: Azerbaijan
- Rayon: Barda

Population
  - Total: 330
- Time zone: UTC+4 (AZT)
  - Summer (DST): UTC+5 (AZT)

Məşədiibişli (also, Məşədi Ibişli) is a village and municipality in the Barda Rayon of Azerbaijan. It has a population of 330.
