= Khalfaraddin =

- Location within Azerbaijan Location within Karabakh Economic Region
- Coordinates: 40°03′42″N 47°24′01″E
- Country: Azerbaijan
- Rayon: Aghjabadi
- Time zone: UTC+4 (AZT)
  - Summer (DST): UTC+5 (AZT)

Khalfaraddin (also, Khalfaradinlu) is a village in the Aghjabadi Rayon of Azerbaijan.
