= Rəncbərlər =

- Municipality
- Location within Azerbaijan Location within Karabakh Economic Region
- Coordinates: 40°03′10″N 47°17′57″E
- Country: Azerbaijan
- Rayon: Aghjabadi

Population
  - Total: 2,062
- Time zone: UTC+4 (AZT)
  - Summer (DST): UTC+5 (AZT)

Rəncbərlər (also, Randzhbarlar and Randzhbarlyar) is a village and municipality in the Aghjabadi Rayon of Azerbaijan. It has a population of 2,062.
