= Gyalmya =

- Location within Azerbaijan Location within Karabakh Economic Region
- Coordinates: 40°11′N 47°41′E
- Country: Azerbaijan
- Rayon: Aghjabadi
- Time zone: UTC+4 (AZT)
  - Summer (DST): UTC+5 (AZT)

Gyalmya (also, Gyal’mya, Gal’mya, and Gyal’ma) is a village in the Aghjabadi Rayon of Azerbaijan.
