= Mehdixanlı =

- Municipality
- Location within Azerbaijan Location within Karabakh Economic Region
- Coordinates: 40°27′50″N 47°02′46″E
- Country: Azerbaijan
- Rayon: Barda

Population
  - Total: 178
- Time zone: UTC+4 (AZT)
  - Summer (DST): UTC+5 (AZT)

Mehdixanlı (also, Mekhdikhanly and Mekhtikhanly) is a village and municipality in the Barda Rayon of Azerbaijan. It has a population of 178.
