= Körpüsındıran =

- Municipality
- Location within Azerbaijan Location within Karabakh Economic Region
- Coordinates: 40°21′N 47°04′E
- Country: Azerbaijan
- Rayon: Barda

Population
  - Total: 550
- Time zone: UTC+4 (AZT)
  - Summer (DST): UTC+5 (AZT)

Körpüsındıran (also, Kërpyusyndyran) is a village and municipality in the Barda Rayon of Azerbaijan. It has a population of 550.
