= Uğurbəyli =

Village and municipality in the Barda Rayon of Azerbaijan

Coordinates: 40°19′N 47°07′E

Uğurbəyli (known as Təzəkənd until 1991) is a village and municipality in the Barda Rayon of Azerbaijan. It has a population of 1,799.
