= Nifçi =

- Municipality
- Location within Azerbaijan Location within Karabakh Economic Region
- Coordinates: 40°25′N 47°17′E
- Country: Azerbaijan
- Rayon: Barda

Population
  - Total: 259
- Time zone: UTC+4 (AZT)
  - Summer (DST): UTC+5 (AZT)

Nifçi (also, Nifchi) is a village and municipality in the Barda Rayon of Azerbaijan. It has a population of 259.

The estimate terrain elevation above sea level is 17 metres.
