= Mirasəfli =

Village and municipality in Azerbaijan

Coordinates: 40°28′N 47°04′E

Mirasəfli is a village and municipality in the Barda Rayon of Azerbaijan. It has a population of 283.
