= Mirzəcəfərli =

- Municipality
- Location within Azerbaijan Location within Karabakh Economic Region
- Coordinates: 40°28′30″N 47°09′55″E
- Country: Azerbaijan
- Rayon: Barda

Population
  - Total: 546
- Time zone: UTC+4 (AZT)
  - Summer (DST): UTC+5 (AZT)

Mirzəcəfərli (also, Mirdazhafarli and Mirzadzhafarli) is a village and municipality in the Barda Rayon of Azerbaijan. It has a population of 546.
