= Bala Ərəblər =

- Municipality
- Location within Azerbaijan Location within Karabakh Economic Region
- Coordinates: 40°24′37″N 47°08′03″E
- Country: Azerbaijan
- Rayon: Barda

Population
  - Total: 941
- Time zone: UTC+4 (AZT)
  - Summer (DST): UTC+5 (AZT)

Bala Ərəblər (known as Güloğlular until 2000) is a village and municipality in the Barda Rayon of Azerbaijan. It has a population of 941.
