= Yeni Əyricə =

- Municipality
- Location within Azerbaijan Location within Karabakh Economic Region
- Coordinates: 40°25′32″N 47°14′40″E
- Country: Azerbaijan
- Rayon: Barda

Population
  - Total: 1,572
- Time zone: UTC+4 (AZT)
  - Summer (DST): UTC+5 (AZT)

Yeni Əyricə (also, Ibragimbeyli, Ragimbeyli, and Yeniayridzha) is a village and municipality in the Barda Rayon of Azerbaijan. It has a population of 1,572.
