= Qarağacı =

- Municipality
- Location within Azerbaijan Location within Karabakh Economic Region
- Coordinates: 40°27′50″N 47°08′44″E
- Country: Azerbaijan
- Rayon: Barda

Population
  - Total: 1,297
- Time zone: UTC+4 (AZT)
  - Summer (DST): UTC+5 (AZT)

Qarağacı (also, Qarahacı, Harahacı, Karagaadzhi, and Karagadzhy) is a village and municipality in the Barda Rayon of Azerbaijan. It has a population of 1,297.

The village name was changed officially to Qarağacı on May 22, 2007.
