= Sordzha =

- Location within Azerbaijan Location within Karabakh Economic Region
- Coordinates: 40°04′N 47°21′E
- Country: Azerbaijan
- Rayon: Aghjabadi
- Time zone: UTC+4 (AZT)
  - Summer (DST): UTC+5 (AZT)

Sordzha (also, Shordzha) is a village in the Aghjabadi Rayon of Azerbaijan.
