= Hacıbədəlli =

- Municipality
- Location within Azerbaijan Location within Karabakh Economic Region
- Coordinates: 40°03′57″N 47°21′57″E
- Country: Azerbaijan
- Rayon: Aghjabadi

Population (2024)
  - Total: 3,706
- Time zone: UTC+4 (AZT)
  - Summer (DST): UTC+5 (AZT)

Hacıbədəlli (also, Hacıbadəlli, Gadzhibedelli, and Gadzhybedelli) is a village and municipality in the Aghjabadi Rayon of Azerbaijan. It has a population of 3,706.
