= Dördüncü Barak =

- Location within Azerbaijan Location within Karabakh Economic Region
- Coordinates: 39°51′44″N 47°27′23″E
- Country: Azerbaijan
- Rayon: Aghjabadi
- Time zone: UTC+4 (AZT)
  - Summer (DST): UTC+5 (AZT)

Dördüncü Barak is a village in the Aghjabadi Rayon of Azerbaijan.
