= Umudalılar =

- Municipality
- Location within Azerbaijan Location within Karabakh Economic Region
- Coordinates: 40°29′N 47°05′E
- Country: Azerbaijan
- Rayon: Barda

Population
  - Total: 96
- Time zone: UTC+4 (AZT)
  - Summer (DST): UTC+5 (AZT)

Umudalılar (also, Umudalylar and Umudallar) is a village and the least populous municipality in the Barda Rayon of Azerbaijan. It has a population of 96.
