= Seyid Yusifli =

- Municipality
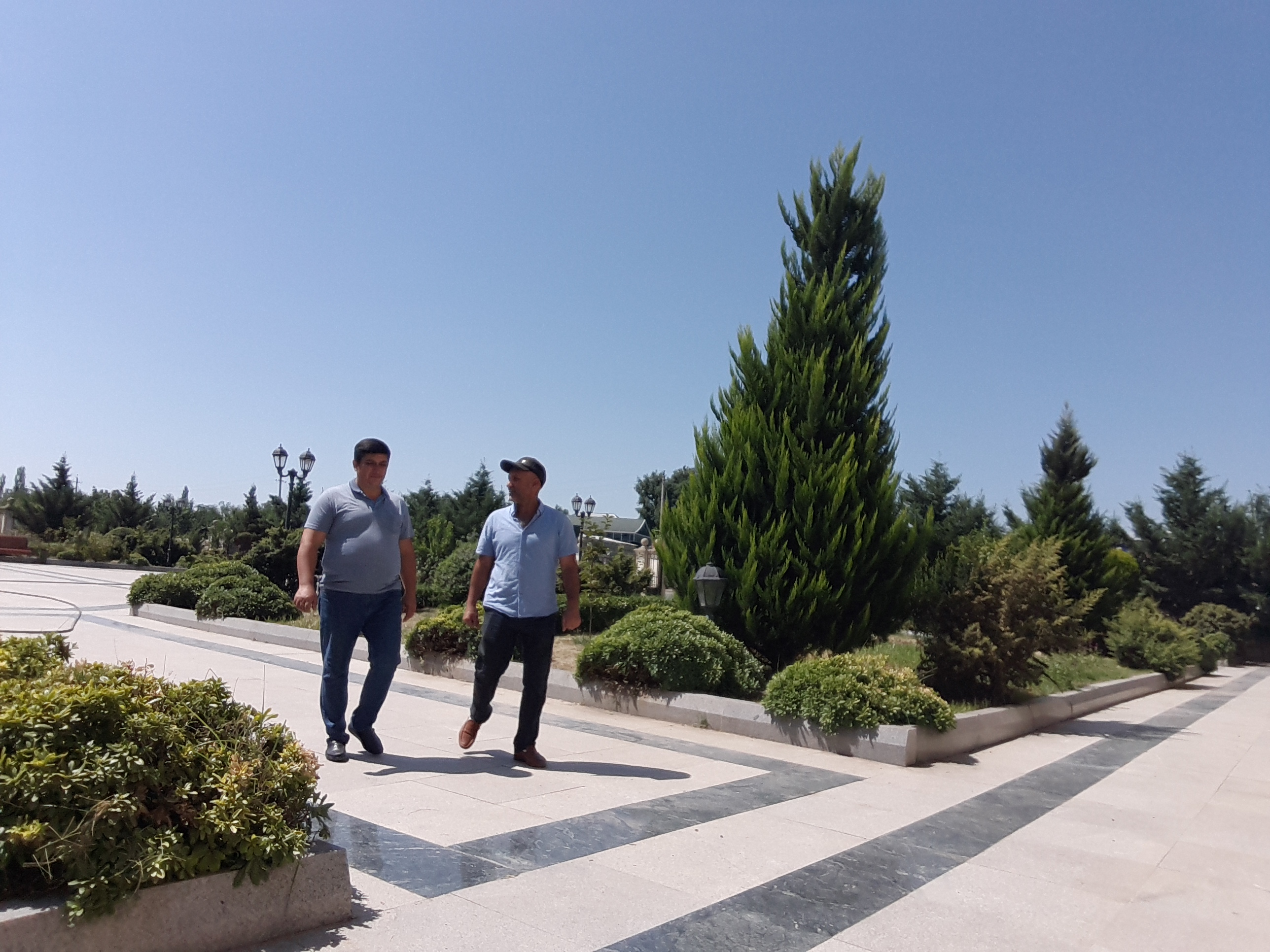

- Location within Azerbaijan Location within Karabakh Economic Region
- Coordinates: 40°28′N 47°02′E
- Country: Azerbaijan
- Rayon: Barda

Population
  - Total: 302
- Time zone: UTC+4 (AZT)
  - Summer (DST): UTC+5 (AZT)

Seyid Yusifli (known as Canavarlı or Dzhanavarly until 2008) is a village and municipality in the Barda Rayon of Azerbaijan. It has a population of 302.
