= Kürdborakı =

- Municipality
- Location within Azerbaijan Location within Karabakh Economic Region
- Coordinates: 40°24′N 47°02′E
- Country: Azerbaijan
- Rayon: Barda

Population
  - Total: 693
- Time zone: UTC+4 (AZT)
  - Summer (DST): UTC+5 (AZT)

Kürdborakı (also, Kürdboragi, Kyurdboragi, and Kyurtboragy) is a village and municipality in the Barda Rayon of Azerbaijan. It has a population of 693.

== Climate ==
Kürdborakı is a steppe climate, with an average of 379 mm (about 15 in.) of precipitation annually. Its low rainfall classifies it as a BSk according to the Köppen-Geiger classification system.
