= Darğalar =

- Municipality
- Location within Azerbaijan Location within Karabakh Economic Region
- Coordinates: 40°21′31″N 47°06′16″E
- Country: Azerbaijan
- Rayon: Barda

Population
  - Total: 386
- Time zone: UTC+4 (AZT)
  - Summer (DST): UTC+5 (AZT)

Darğalar is a village and municipality in the Barda Rayon of Azerbaijan. It has a population of 386.

== History ==
It is believed that the village was founded by Mongol tax officials, descendants of the Dargas, and took its name from them.
