= Qiyaməddinli =

- Municipality
- Location within Azerbaijan Location within Karabakh Economic Region
- Coordinates: 39°58′27″N 47°07′02″E
- Country: Azerbaijan
- Rayon: Aghjabadi
- Time zone: UTC+4 (AZT)
  - Summer (DST): UTC+5 (AZT)

Qiyaməddinli (also, Kiyəməddinli, Kiamadani, Kiyamadinli, and Kiyamandynly) is a village and municipality in the Aghjabadi Rayon of Azerbaijan.
