= Ataxal =

- Location within Azerbaijan
- Coordinates: 40°36′01″N 45°36′15″E
- Country: Azerbaijan
- Rayon: Gadabay
- Municipality: Böyük Qaramurad
- Time zone: UTC+4 (AZT)
  - Summer (DST): UTC+5 (AZT)

Ataxal (also, Atakhal) is a village in the Gadabay Rayon of Azerbaijan. The village forms part of the municipality of Böyük Qaramurad.
