= Yuxarı Qiyaməddinli =

- Municipality
- Location within Azerbaijan Location within Karabakh Economic Region
- Coordinates: 40°07′54″N 47°15′58″E
- Country: Azerbaijan
- Rayon: Aghjabadi
- Time zone: UTC+4 (AZT)
  - Summer (DST): UTC+5 (AZT)

Qiyaməddinli (also, Kiyamadinli and Kiyamadynly) is a village and municipality in the Aghjabadi Rayon of Azerbaijan.
