= Şatırlı, Barda =

Şatırlı
- Municipality
- Location within Azerbaijan Location within Karabakh Economic Region
- Coordinates: 40°24′23″N 47°02′13″E
- Country: Azerbaijan
- Rayon: Barda

Population
  - Total: 568
- Time zone: UTC+4 (AZT)
  - Summer (DST): UTC+5 (AZT)

Şatırlı (also, Shatyrly) is a village and municipality in the Barda Rayon of Azerbaijan. It has a population of 568.
