= Minaxorlu =

Minakhorlu
- Municipality
- Azerbaijani: Minaxorlu
- Location within Azerbaijan
- Coordinates: 39°58′58″N 47°12′05″E
- Country: Azerbaijan
- Rayon: Aghjabadi

Population
  - Total: 1,920
- Time zone: UTC+4 (AZT)
  - Summer (DST): UTC+5 (AZT)

Minaxorlu (also, Minəxorlu and Minakhorlu) is a village and municipality in the Aghjabadi District of Azerbaijan. The population of the village is 1,920.
