= Qaradolaq, Aghjabadi =

Qaradolaq
- Municipality
- Location within Azerbaijan Location within Karabakh Economic Region
- Coordinates: 39°55′33″N 47°28′05″E
- Country: Azerbaijan
- Rayon: Aghjabadi

Population
  - Total: 2,746
- Time zone: UTC+4 (AZT)
  - Summer (DST): UTC+5 (AZT)

Qaradolaq (known as Şaumyankənd until 1991) is a village and municipality in the Aghjabadi Rayon of Azerbaijan. It has a population of 2,746.
