= Kazim Mammadov =

Azerbaijani soldier

- Born: September 1, 1969; Boyuk Marjanly, Jabrayil District, Azerbaijan SSR, USSR
- Died: November 15, 1991 (aged 22); Derekend, Khojavend District, Azerbaijan
- Military career
- Allegiance: Republic of Azerbaijan
- Service years: 1991
- Conflicts: First Nagorno-Karabakh War
- Awards: National Hero of Azerbaijan; 1992

Kazim Ershad oghlu Mammadov (Azerbaijani: Kazım Ərşad oğlu Məmmədov) (1 October 1969, Boyuk Marjanly, Jabrayil District, Azerbaijan – 15 November 1991, Derekend, Azerbaijan) was the National Hero of Azerbaijan, and warrior of the First Nagorno-Karabakh War.

== Early life and education ==
Kazim Mammadov was born on 1 October 1969 in Bëyuk Mardzhanly village of Jabrayil District of Azerbaijan SSR. In 1986, he completed his secondary education at Bëyuk Mardzhanly village secondary school. From 1988 through 1990, Mammadov served in the Soviet Armed Forces. After completing his military service, he returned to Ganja, Azerbaijan.

== First Nagorno-Karabakh War ==
The Armenians attacked the territories of Azerbaijan in 1991. At that time, he started to work as a police officer in the Jabrayil District Internal Affairs Department, and was assigned to the frontlines. Mammadov took part in several battles around the villages of Khojavend District.

On November 15, 1991, Mammadov was killed in a fight when Armenian soldiers attacked the Darakand village of Khojavend District.

== Honors ==
By the Decree of the President of Azerbaijan No. 264 dated October 8, 1992, Mammadov was posthumously awarded the title of the National Hero of Azerbaijan.

He was buried at a cemetery in Bëyuk Mardzhanly. A school in Bëyuk Mardzhanly was named after him.

== See also ==
- First Nagorno-Karabakh War
- National Hero of Azerbaijan

== Sources ==
- Vugar Asgarov. Azərbaycanın Milli Qəhrəmanları (Yenidən işlənmiş II nəşr). Bakı: "Dərələyəz-M", 2010, səh. 198.
