= Pərioğlular, Aghjabadi =

Pərioğlular
- Municipality
- Location within Azerbaijan Location within Karabakh Economic Region
- Coordinates: 40°05′20″N 47°21′26″E
- Country: Azerbaijan
- Rayon: Aghjabadi

Population
  - Total: 1,476
- Time zone: UTC+4 (AZT)
  - Summer (DST): UTC+5 (AZT)

Pərioğlular (also, Pərioğullar, Parioglylar, and Perioglular) is a village and municipality in the Aghjabadi Rayon of Azerbaijan. It has a population of 1,476.
