= Bala Kəhrizli =

- Municipality
- Location within Azerbaijan Location within Karabakh Economic Region
- Coordinates: 40°00′N 47°11′E
- Country: Azerbaijan
- Rayon: Aghjabadi

Population
  - Total: 1,106
- Time zone: UTC+4 (AZT)
  - Summer (DST): UTC+5 (AZT)

Bala Kəhrizli (also, Bala Kyagrizli and Kyagrizli-Akhmedbeyli) is a village and municipality in the Aghjabadi Rayon of Azerbaijan. It has a population of 1,106.
