= Sarıcalı, Aghjabadi =

Sarıcalı
- Municipality
- Location within Azerbaijan Location within Karabakh Economic Region
- Coordinates: 40°08′28″N 47°11′22″E
- Country: Azerbaijan
- Rayon: Aghjabadi

Population
  - Total: 1,540
- Time zone: UTC+4 (AZT)
  - Summer (DST): UTC+5 (AZT)

Sarıcalı (also, Sarydzhaly) is a village and municipality in the Aghjabadi Rayon of Azerbaijan. It has a population of 1,540.
