= Göyük, Aghjabadi =

Göyük
- Municipality
- Location within Azerbaijan Location within Karabakh Economic Region
- Coordinates: 40°02′N 47°15′E
- Country: Azerbaijan
- Rayon: Aghjabadi

Population
  - Total: 737
- Time zone: UTC+4 (AZT)
  - Summer (DST): UTC+5 (AZT)

Göyük (also, Köyük, Gëyuk and Keyuk) is a village and municipality in the Aghjabadi Rayon of Azerbaijan. It has a population of 737.
