= Bala Göyüşlü =

Village in Barda District, Azerbaijan

- Municipality
- Location within Azerbaijan Location within Karabakh Economic Region
- Coordinates: 40°20′N 47°15′E
- Country: Azerbaijan
- Rayon: Barda

Population
  - Total: 306
- Time zone: UTC+4 (AZT)
  - Summer (DST): UTC+5 (AZT)

Bala Göyüşlü (also, Bala Gëyushlyu) is a village and municipality in the Barda District of Azerbaijan. It has a population of 306.
