= Şahsevən, Aghjabadi =

Şahsevən
- Municipality
- Location within Azerbaijan Location within Karabakh Economic Region
- Coordinates: 40°01′29″N 47°15′28″E
- Country: Azerbaijan
- Rayon: Aghjabadi

Population
  - Total: 375
- Time zone: UTC+4 (AZT)
  - Summer (DST): UTC+5 (AZT)

Şahsevən (also, Shakhsevan) is a village and municipality in the Aghjabadi Rayon of Azerbaijan. It has a population of 375.
