= Yeni Qaradolaq =

- Municipality
- Location within Azerbaijan Location within Karabakh Economic Region
- Coordinates: 39°54′23″N 47°25′18″E
- Country: Azerbaijan
- Rayon: Aghjabadi

Population
  - Total: 2,282
- Time zone: UTC+4 (AZT)
  - Summer (DST): UTC+5 (AZT)

Yeni Qaradolaq (also, Yenikaradolak) is a village and municipality in the Aghjabadi Rayon of Azerbaijan. It has a population of 2,282.
