= Yagub Mammadov (singer) =

Yagub Mammadov Yaqub Məmmədov
- Born: 5 May 1930; Aghjabadi District, Azerbaijan SSR, TSFSR, USSR
- Died: 5 June 2002 (aged 72); Baku, Azerbaijan
- Genres: mugham
- Occupation: khananda
- Years active: 1949–2002
- Awards

Yagub Mammad oghlu Mammadov (Azerbaijani: Yaqub Məmməd oğlu Məmmədov, 5 May 1930 – 5 June 2002) was an Azerbaijani khananda, or mugham singer.

== Biography ==
Yagub Mammadov was born on 5 May 1930 in Aghjabadi District. In 1956 he came to Baku for the Republican Youth Festival and became a laureate of the festival. Then he was invited to the Azerbaijan State Philharmonic Hall. Mammadov had been working at the Philharmonic since 1958 and simultaneously studying in the class of Seyid Shushinski at the Asaf Zeynalli Music College. Mammadov was a soloist at the Azerbaijan State Philharmonic Hall for many years and performed at concerts. His mugham performances, recorded on gramophone shafts, have spread throughout the Near and Middle East.

Mammadov died on 5 June 2002 in Baku.

== Awards ==
- People's Artists of the Azerbaijan SSR – 29 October 1990
- Honored Artist of the Azerbaijan SSR – 1 December 1982
- Shohrat Order – 3 December 2001
