= Cəfərbəyli =

Jafarbeyli
- Municipality
- Azerbaijani: Cəfərbəyli
- Location within Azerbaijan Location within Karabakh Economic Region
- Coordinates: 40°04′50″N 47°24′20″E
- Country: Azerbaijan
- District: Aghjabadi

Population
  - Total: 750
- Time zone: UTC+4 (AZT)
  - Summer (DST): UTC+5 (AZT)

Cəfərbəyli (also, Jafarbeyli) is a village and municipality in the Aghjabadi District of Azerbaijan. It has a population of 750.
