= İsaqbağı =

- Municipality
- Location within Azerbaijan
- Coordinates: 40°11′11″N 47°45′44″E
- Country: Azerbaijan
- Rayon: Zardab

Population
  - Total: 1,195
- Time zone: UTC+4 (AZT)
  - Summer (DST): UTC+5 (AZT)

İsaqbağı (also, Isakbagi and Isakbagy) is a village and municipality in the Zardab Rayon of Azerbaijan. It has a population of 1,195. The municipality consists of the villages of İsaqbağı and Böyük Dəkkə.
