= Tağılar, Barda =

Tağılar
- Municipality
- Location within Azerbaijan Location within Karabakh Economic Region
- Coordinates: 40°29′N 47°03′E
- Country: Azerbaijan
- Rayon: Barda

Population
  - Total: 277
- Time zone: UTC+4 (AZT)
  - Summer (DST): UTC+5 (AZT)

Tağılar (also, Tagilar and Tagylar) is a village and municipality in the Barda Rayon of Azerbaijan. It has a population of 277.
