= Aghjabadi =

Aghjabadi Ağcabədi
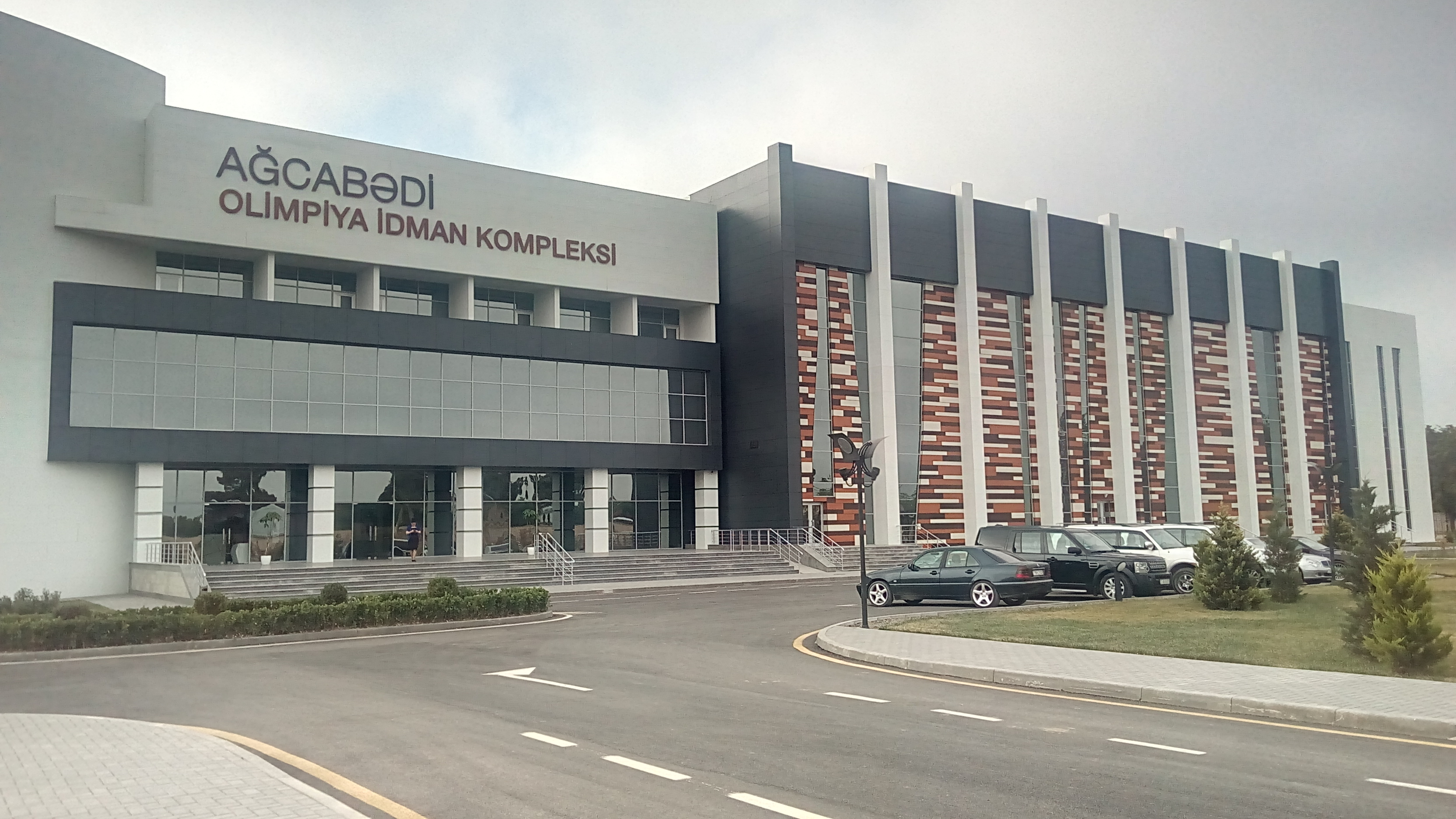
- Agjabedi Olympic Complex

- Location within Azerbaijan Location within Karabakh Economic Region
- Coordinates: 40°03′10″N 47°27′41″E
- Country: Azerbaijan
- District: Aghjabadi
- Founded: 1962
- City status: 1965
- Elevation: 16 m (52 ft)

Population (2020)
  - Total: 43,000
- Time zone: UTC+4 (AZT)
- AZ 0400: Postal code
- Area code: +994 113
- Vehicle registration: 04
- Website: agcabedi-ih.gov.az

Aghjabadi (Azerbaijani: Ağcabədi) is a city in and the capital of the Aghjabadi District of Azerbaijan. It is situated in central Azerbaijan.

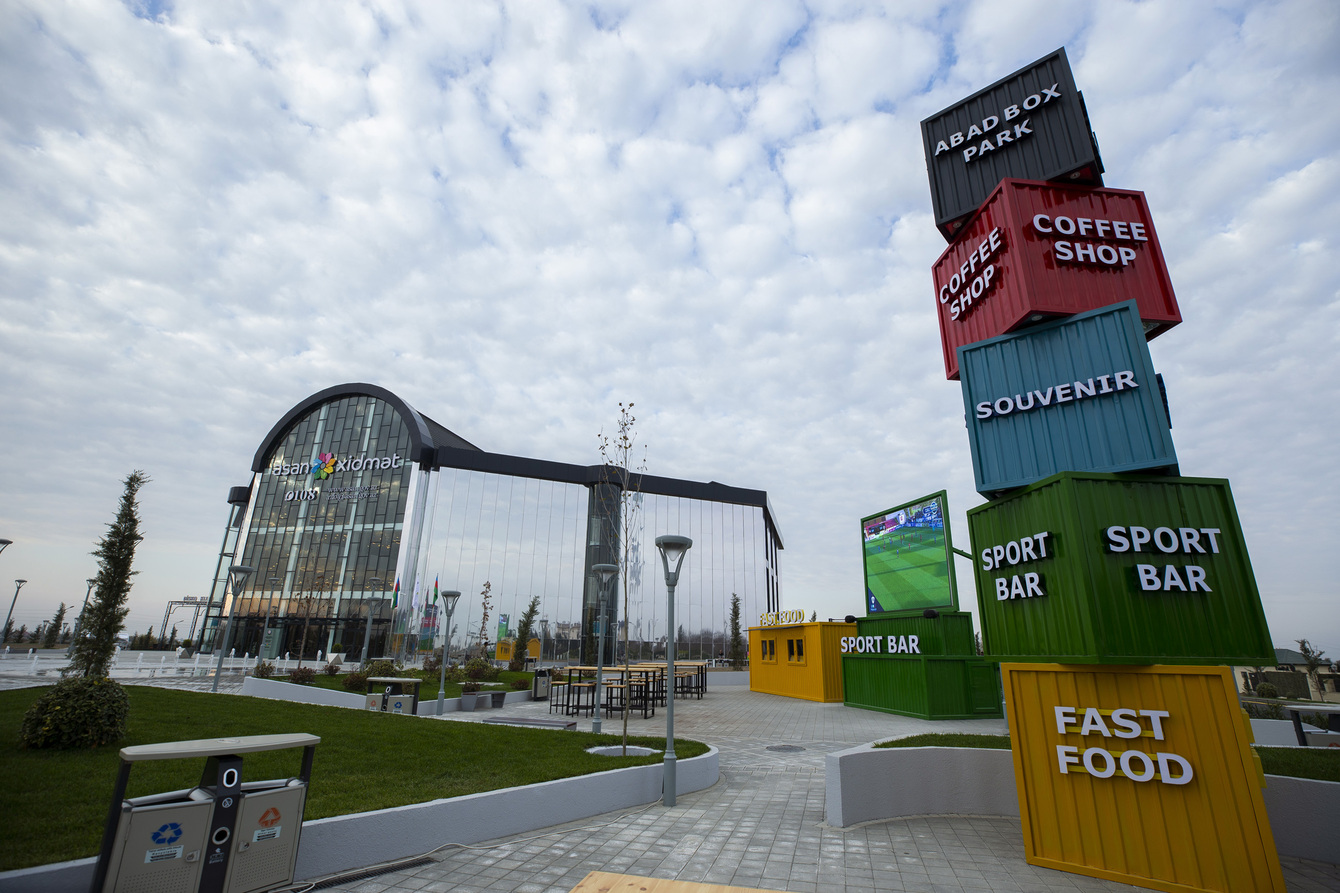
ASAN service Agjabedi

== Etymology ==
In Azerbaijani, the city is known as Aghjabadi (Azerbaijani: Ağcabədi) which means "large settlement" ("aghja" – large, "badi" – residence, settlement).

== Notable natives ==
- Uzeyir Hajibeyov — composer. He is recognized as the father of Azerbaijani classical music and opera. Hajibeyov composed music for the national anthem of Azerbaijan and the state anthem of Azerbaijan SSR. He is the first Muslim author of an opera; People's Artist of USSR (1948).
- Vilayat Guliyev — Minister of Foreign Affairs of Azerbaijan (1999–2004).

== Twin towns ==
- (Georgia (country)) Batumi, Georgia
- Rize, Turkey
