= Gələbədin =

- Municipality
- Location within Azerbaijan Location within Karabakh Economic Region
- Coordinates: 40°08′30″N 47°14′55″E
- Country: Azerbaijan
- Rayon: Aghjabadi

Population
  - Total: 1,180
- Time zone: UTC+4 (AZT)
  - Summer (DST): UTC+5 (AZT)

Gələbədin (also, Kələbədin and Gelebedin) is a village and municipality in the Aghjabadi Rayon of Azerbaijan. It has a population of 1,180.
