= Toplar =

Village in Gadabay District, Azerbaijan

- Village
- Location in Azerbaijan
- Coordinates: 40°34′N 45°37′E
- Country: Azerbaijan
- Rayon: Gadabay
- Municipality: Böyük Qaramurad
- Time zone: UTC+4 (AZT)

Toplar is a village in the municipality of Böyük Qaramurad in the Gadabay Rayon of Azerbaijan.
