= Janavartepe =

Archaeological site in Azerbaijan

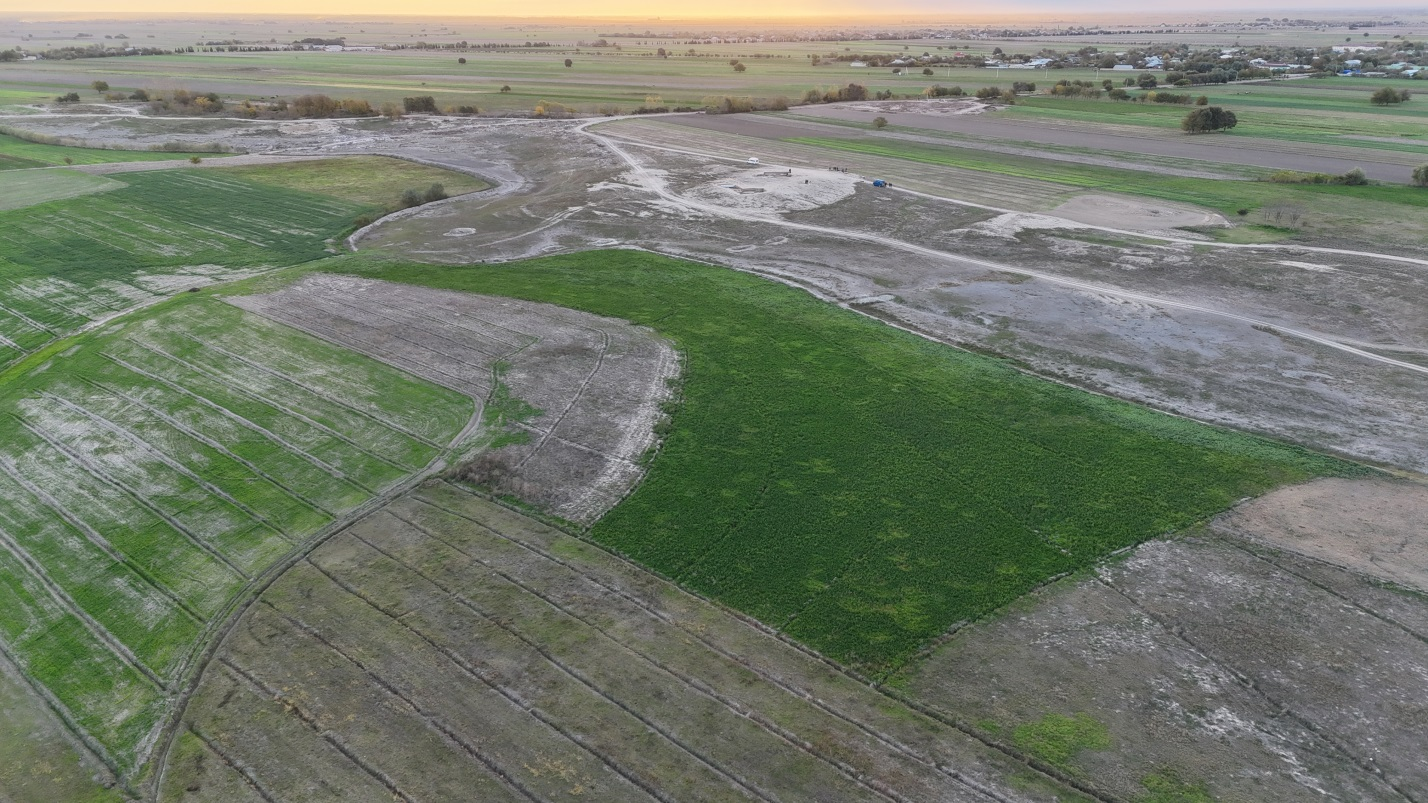
Archaeological site of Janavartepe

The Janavartepe archaeological settlement is located approximately 700 meters north of Tainaq village in the Aghjabadi District of Azerbaijan. The site lies on the right slope of the Shirkhan Gobu ravine and is positioned atop a natural hill that rises up to 4 meters in height. Measuring roughly 120 meters in diameter, Janavartepe is a part of the Leylatepe culture of the Chalcolithic period. The southeastern portion of the settlement has sustained damage from modern bulldozing, with disturbances reaching a depth of approximately 2.3 meters. According to radiocarbon analysis, the Chalcolithic settlement of Janavartepe dates to the 39th-35th centuries BC.

== Archaeology ==
The first archaeological investigations at the site were carried out over two field seasons between 2022 and 2024, as part of the Lowland Karabakh Research and Excavation Project. Initial excavations commenced in 2022. The research was jointly conducted by the Institute of Archaeology and Anthropology of ANAS and the Eurasia Department of the German Archaeological Institute, under the direction of Khagani Almemmedov and Mark Isserlis.

Excavations revealed dense stratigraphic sequences, including four layers from the Late Chalcolithic period, as well as burials from Kura-Araxes, Bedeni and Late Bronze Age-Early Iron Age periods. Three rounded and one oval dugout, along with cretulae (clay lumps, used to seal containers or doors) were uncovered during two excavation seasons. Burials associated with the Kura-Araxes, Bedeni and Khojaly-Gadabay cultures were also discovered at Janavartepe.

== See also ==
- Archaeological site of Selbir
- Stone Age in Azerbaijan
- Archaeological site of Tava tepe
