= Şotlanlı, Aghjabadi =

Şotlanlı
- Municipality
- Location within Azerbaijan Location within Karabakh Economic Region
- Coordinates: 40°02′50″N 47°10′00″E
- Country: Azerbaijan
- Rayon: Aghjabadi

Population
  - Total: 285
- Time zone: UTC+4 (AZT)
  - Summer (DST): UTC+5 (AZT)

Şotlanlı (also, Shotlanly) is a village and municipality in the Aghjabadi Rayon of Azerbaijan. It has a population of 285.
