= Şənlik =

- Municipality
- Location within Azerbaijan
- Coordinates: 40°08′06″N 47°25′58″E
- Country: Azerbaijan
- Rayon: Aghjabadi

Area
  - Municipality: 4.54 km^{2} (1.75 sq mi)
  - Urban: 1.99 km^{2} (0.77 sq mi)
- Elevation: 5 m (16 ft)

Population
  - Municipality: 2,821
- Time zone: UTC+4 (AZT)
  - Summer (DST): UTC+5 (AZT)

Şənlik is a village and municipality in the Aghjabadi Rayon of Azerbaijan. It has a population of 2,821.
