= Ağabəyli, Aghjabadi =

Ağabəyli
- Municipality
- Location within Azerbaijan Location within Karabakh Economic Region
- Coordinates: 40°03′47″N 47°22′04″E
- Country: Azerbaijan
- Rayon: Aghjabadi

Population
  - Total: 462
- Time zone: UTC+4 (AZT)
  - Summer (DST): UTC+5 (AZT)

Ağabəyli (also, Agabeyli and Agebeyli) is a village and municipality in the Aghjabadi Rayon of Azerbaijan. It has a population of 462.
