= Arazbar =

- Municipality
- Location within Azerbaijan Location within Karabakh Economic Region
- Coordinates: 39°59′06″N 47°08′41″E
- Country: Azerbaijan
- Rayon: Aghjabadi

Population
  - Total: 1,279
- Time zone: UTC+4 (AZT)
  - Summer (DST): UTC+5 (AZT)

Arazbar (also, Arasbar, Arazbarı, Araspar, Arasparlu, and Arazbary) is a village and municipality in the Aghjabadi Rayon of Azerbaijan. It has a population of 1,279.
