= Hacılar, Aghjabadi =

Hacılar
- Municipality
- Location within Azerbaijan Location within Karabakh Economic Region
- Coordinates: 40°03′07″N 47°06′50″E
- Country: Azerbaijan
- Rayon: Aghjabadi

Population
  - Total: 1,240
- Time zone: UTC+4 (AZT)
  - Summer (DST): UTC+5 (AZT)

Hacılar (also, Gadzhylar) is a village and municipality in the Aghjabadi Rayon of Azerbaijan. It has a population of 1,240.
