= İmamqulubəyli, Barda =

İmamqulubəyli
- Municipality
- Location within Azerbaijan Location within Karabakh Economic Region
- Coordinates: 40°23′0″N 47°05′0″E
- Country: Azerbaijan
- Rayon: Barda
- Elevation: 102 m (335 ft)

Population
  - Total: 624
- Time zone: UTC+4 (AZT)
  - Summer (DST): UTC+5 (AZT)

İmamqulubəyli (also, Imamkulubeyli) is a village and municipality in the Barda Rayon of Azerbaijan. It has a population of 624.
