= Xocavənd, Aghjabadi =

Xocavənd
- Municipality
- Location within Azerbaijan Location within Karabakh Economic Region
- Coordinates: 40°02′07″N 47°25′19″E
- Country: Azerbaijan
- Rayon: Aghjabadi

Population
  - Total: 3,018
- Time zone: UTC+4 (AZT)
  - Summer (DST): UTC+5 (AZT)

Xocavənd (also, Khodzhavend) is a village and municipality in the Aghjabadi Rayon of Azerbaijan. It has a population of 3,018.

== Notable natives ==
- Sadig Huseynov — National Hero of Azerbaijan.
