= Seviyan, Azerbaijan =

Seviyan
- Village
- Location within Azerbaijan
- Coordinates: 40°19′58″N 47°04′05″E
- Country: Azerbaijan
- Rayon: Barda
- Time zone: UTC+4 (AZT)
  - Summer (DST): UTC+5 (AZT)

Seviyan is a village in the Barda Rayon of Azerbaijan.

This village may have undergone a name change or may no longer exist as an area of human habitation, since no Azerbaijani website seems to mention it under this name.
