= Bala Qəcər =

- Municipality
- Location within Azerbaijan Location within Karabakh Economic Region
- Coordinates: 40°19′N 47°09′E
- Country: Azerbaijan
- Rayon: Barda

Population
  - Total: 797
- Time zone: UTC+4 (AZT)
  - Summer (DST): UTC+5 (AZT)

Bala Qəcər (also, Bala Kadzhar and Bala Qacar) is a village and municipality in the Barda Rayon of Azerbaijan. It has a population of 797.
