= Böyük Kəhrizli =

- Municipality
- Location within Azerbaijan Location within Karabakh Economic Region
- Coordinates: 40°01′20″N 47°10′22″E
- Country: Azerbaijan
- Rayon: Aghjabadi

Population
  - Total: 613
- Time zone: UTC+4 (AZT)
  - Summer (DST): UTC+5 (AZT)

Böyük Kəhrizli (also known as Bëyuk Kyagrizli, Beyuk-Khagrizli, and Kyagrizli-Nasirbeyli) is a village and municipality in the Aghjabadi Rayon of Azerbaijan. It has a population of 613.
