= Taynaq =

- Municipality
- Location within Azerbaijan Location within Karabakh Economic Region
- Coordinates: 40°07′14″N 47°10′02″E
- Country: Azerbaijan
- Rayon: Aghjabadi

Population
  - Total: 810
- Time zone: UTC+4 (AZT)
  - Summer (DST): UTC+5 (AZT)

Taynaq (also, Taynag and Taynakh) is a village and municipality in the Aghjabadi Rayon of Azerbaijan. It has a population of 810.
