= Gülallı =

- Location within Azerbaijan
- Coordinates: 40°35′N 45°39′E
- Country: Azerbaijan
- Rayon: Gadabay
- Municipality: Böyük Qaramurad
- Time zone: UTC+4 (AZT)
  - Summer (DST): UTC+5 (AZT)

Gülallı (known as Qurudərə until 2015) is a village in the Gadabay Rayon of Azerbaijan. The village forms part of the municipality of Böyük Qaramurad.
