= Böyük Mərcanlı =

Boyuk Marjanly
- Azerbaijani: Böyük Mərcanlı
- Location within Azerbaijan
- Coordinates: 39°21′40″N 47°14′49″E
- Country: Azerbaijan
- District: Jabrayil

Population
  - Total: 0
- Time zone: UTC+4 (AZT)
  - Summer (DST): UTC+5 (AZT)

Böyük Mərcanlı (also, Boyuk Marjanly) is a village in the Jabrayil District of Azerbaijan. It is currently uninhabited.

Following the First Nagorno-Karabakh War, the village came under the effective control of the self-declared Republic of Artsakh and was administered as part of Hadrut Province. On 27 September 2020 the Azerbaijani Armed Forces regained control of the village during the 2020 Nagorno-Karabakh conflict.

== Notable natives ==
- Kazim Mammadov — National Hero of Azerbaijan.
