= Böyük Xınıslı =

Coordinates: 40°39′N 48°37′E

Böyük Xınıslı is a village and municipality in the Shamakhi Rayon of Azerbaijan. It has a population of 448.
