= Şotlanlı, Qubadli =

Şotlanlı
- Location within Azerbaijan
- Coordinates: 39°18′N 46°43′E
- Country: Azerbaijan
- Rayon: Qubadli
- Time zone: UTC+4 (AZT)
  - Summer (DST): UTC+5 (AZT)

Şotlanlı (also, Shotlanly and Shotulany) is a village in the Qubadli Rayon of Azerbaijan.
