= Pərioğlular, Agdam =

Perioglular Azerbaijani: Pərioğlular
- Location within Azerbaijan Location within Karabakh Economic Region
- Coordinates: 39°58′48″N 46°56′16″E
- Country: Azerbaijan
- Rayon: Agdam
- Time zone: UTC+4 (AZT)
  - Summer (DST): UTC+5 (AZT)

Pərioğlular (also, Peioglylar and Perioglular) is a village in the Agdam Rayon of Azerbaijan.
