= Qaradolaq, Qakh =

Coordinates: 41.2464°N 46.7903°E

Qaradolaq is a municipality and village in the Qakh Rayon of Azerbaijan. It has a population of 186.
