= Qaravəlli, Agsu =

Qaravəlli
- Municipality
- Location within Azerbaijan
- Coordinates: 40°31′05″N 48°16′15″E
- Country: Azerbaijan
- Rayon: Agsu

Population
  - Total: 378
- Time zone: UTC+4 (AZT)
  - Summer (DST): UTC+5 (AZT)

Qaravəlli (also, Qaravəlili, Kara-Vali, and Karavelli) is a village and municipality in the Agsu Rayon of Azerbaijan. It has a population of 378.
