= Balaca Həmyə =

- Municipality
- Location within Azerbaijan
- Coordinates: 41°04′25″N 49°09′00″E
- Country: Azerbaijan
- Rayon: Siazan

Population
  - Total: 934
- Time zone: UTC+4 (AZT)
  - Summer (DST): UTC+5 (AZT)

Balaca Həmyə (also, Baladzha-Gam’ya and Kichik Gam’ya) is a village and municipality in the Siazan Rayon of Azerbaijan. It has a population of 934.
