= Qaravəlli, Aghjabadi =

Garavelli
- Municipality
- Location within Azerbaijan Location within Karabakh Economic Region
- Coordinates: 40°11′12″N 47°14′52″E
- Country: Azerbaijan
- Rayon: Aghjabadi

Population
  - Total: 2,713
- Time zone: UTC+4 (AZT)
  - Summer (DST): UTC+5 (AZT)

Qaravəlli (also Karavelli, Garavelli) is a village and municipality in the Aghjabadi Rayon of Azerbaijan. It has a population of 2,713.
