= Kürdlər, Jalilabad =

Kürdlər
- Municipality
- Location within Azerbaijan
- Coordinates: 39°13′01″N 48°23′38″E
- Country: Azerbaijan
- Rayon: Jalilabad

Population
  - Total: 705
- Time zone: UTC+4 (AZT)
  - Summer (DST): UTC+5 (AZT)

Kürdlər (also, Kurdlyar and Kyurdlyar) is a village and municipality in the Jalilabad Rayon of Azerbaijan. It has a population of 69.
