= Böyük Göyüşlü =

- Municipality
- Location within Azerbaijan Location within Karabakh Economic Region
- Coordinates: 40°20′N 47°15′E
- Country: Azerbaijan
- Rayon: Barda

Population
  - Total: 1,121
- Time zone: UTC+4 (AZT)
  - Summer (DST): UTC+5 (AZT)

Böyük Göyüşlü (also, Bëyuk Gëyushlyu) is a village and municipality in the Barda Rayon of Azerbaijan. It has a population of 1,121.
