= Karavelli, Neftchala =

Karavelli
- Location within Azerbaijan
- Coordinates: 39°24′12″N 49°14′46″E
- Country: Azerbaijan
- Rayon: Neftchala
- Time zone: UTC+4 (AZT)
  - Summer (DST): UTC+5 (AZT)

Karavelli (also, Karavelly) is a village in the Neftchala Rayon of Azerbaijan.
