= Böyük Dəkkə =

- Location within Azerbaijan
- Coordinates: 40°11′38″N 47°45′14″E
- Country: Azerbaijan
- Rayon: Zardab
- Time zone: UTC+4 (AZT)
  - Summer (DST): UTC+5 (AZT)

Böyük Dəkkə (also, Bëyuk Dekkya) is a village in the Zardab Rayon of Azerbaijan. The village forms part of the municipality of İsaqbağı.
