= Böyük Qaramurad =

- Municipality
- Location within Azerbaijan
- Coordinates: 40°34′51″N 45°39′49″E
- Country: Azerbaijan
- Rayon: Gadabay

Population
  - Total: 2,684
- Time zone: UTC+4 (AZT)
  - Summer (DST): UTC+5 (AZT)

Böyük Qaramurad (also, Bëyuk-Karamurad) is a village and municipality in the Gadabay Rayon of Azerbaijan. It has a population of 2,684. The municipality consists of the villages of Böyük Qaramurad, Ataxal, Qurudərə, and Toplar.

== History ==
According to local folk tales, Qaramurad was a Turkic prince who ruled the region.

During Shah Abbas I, some Christian families were forced to move to Iran. Some of them refused this migration and sought asylum in regions under Georgian princes. In total four Christian temples were built, only one of them, Böyük Qaramurad Monastery is in good conditions today.

After the Turkmenchay Treaty some Armenian families settled in the region.

According to local records, at the end of XIX and the beginning of the XX all population was Azerbaijani.
