= Kiçik Amili =

Kiçik Əmili
- Municipality
- Location within Azerbaijan Location within Shaki-Zagatala Economic Region
- Coordinates: 40°50′59″N 47°46′52″E
- Country: Azerbaijan
- Rayon: Qabala

Population
  - Total: 577
- Time zone: UTC+4 (AZT)

Kiçik Əmili (also, Kichik Emili and Kichik-Amili) is a village and municipality in the Qabala Rayon of Azerbaijan. It has a population of 577.
