= Muğanlı, Aghjabadi =

Mughanly
- Municipality
- Azerbaijani: Muğanlı
- Location within Azerbaijan
- Coordinates: 40°00′53″N 47°16′14″E
- Country: Azerbaijan
- Rayon: Aghjabadi

Population
  - Total: 1,510
- Time zone: UTC+4 (AZT)
  - Summer (DST): UTC+5 (AZT)

Mughanly (also, Karkar-Mughanlysy) is a village and municipality in the Aghjabadi of Azerbaijan. It has a population of 1,510.
