= Şatırlı, Jalilabad =

Şatırlı
- Municipality
- Location within Azerbaijan
- Coordinates: 39°05′12″N 48°19′54″E
- Country: Azerbaijan
- Rayon: Jalilabad

Population
  - Total: 1,244
- Time zone: UTC+4 (AZT)
  - Summer (DST): UTC+5 (AZT)

Şatırlı (also, Shatyrly) is a village and municipality in the Jalilabad Rayon of Azerbaijan. It has a population of 1,244.
