= Ağabəyli, Agsu =

Ağabəyli
- Municipality
- Location within Azerbaijan
- Coordinates: 40°30′N 48°25′E
- Country: Azerbaijan
- Rayon: Agsu

Population
  - Total: 528
- Time zone: UTC+4 (AZT)
  - Summer (DST): UTC+5 (AZT)

Ağabəyli (also, Ağabeyli, Agabeyli, and Agalarbeyli) is a village and municipality in the Agsu Rayon of Azerbaijan. It has a population of 528.

The village is located on the banks of the Ağsu River, in the Shirvan Plain.
