= Qaravəlli, Shamakhi =

Qaravəlli
- Municipality
- Location within Azerbaijan
- Coordinates: 40°38′06″N 48°32′56″E
- Country: Azerbaijan
- Rayon: Shamakhi

Population
  - Total: 1,146
- Time zone: UTC+4 (AZT)
  - Summer (DST): UTC+5 (AZT)

Qaravəlli (also, Karavelli and Kora-Velly) is a village and municipality in the Shamakhi Rayon of Azerbaijan. It has a population of 1,146.
