= Nəcəfqulubəyli, Aghjabadi =

Nəcəfqulubəyli
- Municipality
- Location within Azerbaijan Location within Karabakh Economic Region
- Coordinates: 40°09′09″N 47°32′50″E
- Country: Azerbaijan
- Rayon: Aghjabadi

Population
  - Total: 1,060
- Time zone: UTC+4 (AZT)
  - Summer (DST): UTC+5 (AZT)

Nəcəfqulubəyli (also, Nəcəfqulubəli, Nadzhafkulibeyli, Nadzhafkulubeyli, and Nadzhafulibeyli) is a village and municipality in the Aghjabadi Rayon of Azerbaijan. It has a population of 1,060.
