= Birinci Şahsevən =

- Municipality
- Location within Azerbaijan
- Coordinates: 39°38′14″N 47°45′10″E
- Country: Azerbaijan
- Rayon: Beylagan

Population
  - Total: 7,345
- Time zone: UTC+4 (AZT)
  - Summer (DST): UTC+5 (AZT)

Birinci Şahsevən (also, Shakhsevan, Shakhsevan Pervoye, and Shakhsevan Pervyy) is a village and the most populous municipality, except the capital Beyləqan, in the Beylagan Rayon of Azerbaijan. It has a population of 7,345.
