= İkinci Şahsevən =

- Municipality
- Location within Azerbaijan
- Coordinates: 39°37′47″N 47°42′09″E
- Country: Azerbaijan
- Rayon: Beylagan

Population
  - Total: 2,742
- Time zone: UTC+4 (AZT)
  - Summer (DST): UTC+5 (AZT)

İkinci Şahsevən (also, Shakhsevan, Shakhsevan Vtoroy, Shakhsevan Vtoroye, and Shakhseven Vtoroye) is a village and municipality in the Beylagan Rayon of Azerbaijan. It has a population of 2,742.
