= Qarah Vali, Kermanshah =

Qarah Vali قره ولي
- Village
- Location within Iran
- Coordinates: 34°21′48″N 47°26′15″E
- Country: Iran
- Province: Kermanshah
- County: Harsin
- Bakhsh: Bisotun
- Rural District: Cham Chamal

Population (2006)
  - Total: 181
- Time zone: UTC+3:30 (IRST)
  - Summer (DST): UTC+4:30 (IRDT)

Qarah Vali (Persian: قره ولي, also Romanized as Qarah Valī) is a village in Cham Chamal Rural District, Bisotun District, Harsin County, Kermanshah Province, Iran. At the 2006 census, its population was 181, in 37 families.
