= İmamqulubəyli (village), Agdam =

İmamqulubəyli
- Location within Azerbaijan Location within Karabakh Economic Region
- Coordinates: 40°10′47.4″N 47°10′39.0″E
- Country: Azerbaijan
- Rayon: Agdam
- Time zone: UTC+4 (AZT)
  - Summer (DST): UTC+5 (AZT)

İmamqulubəyli (Imamgulubeyli) is a village in the Agdam District of Azerbaijan.
