= Al-'Amili =

People with the Al-'Amili surname include:

- Bahāʾ al-dīn al-ʿĀmilī
- Muhammad Jamaluddin al-Makki al-Amili
- Zayn al-Din al-Juba'i al-'Amili
- Al-Hurr al-Amili
- Thalaba ibn Salama al-Amili
