= Qacar Zeyid =

Qajar Zeyid
- Municipality
- Azerbaijani: Qacar Zeyid
- Location within Azerbaijan
- Coordinates: 41°22′N 48°38′E
- Country: Azerbaijan
- District: Quba

Population
  - Total: 781
- Time zone: UTC+4 (AZT)
  - Summer (DST): UTC+5 (AZT)

Qacar Zeyid (also, Qəcər Zeyid, Qajar Zeyd) – is a village and municipality in the Quba District of Azerbaijan. It has a population of 781.
