= Pirali, West Azerbaijan =

Pirali پیرعلی
- Village
- Location within Iran
- Coordinates: 37°19′09″N 45°17′36″E
- Country: Iran
- Province: West Azerbaijan
- County: Urmia
- Bakhsh: Central
- Rural District: Dul

Population (2006)
  - Total: 370
- Time zone: UTC+3:30 (IRST)
  - Summer (DST): UTC+4:30 (IRDT)

Pirali (Persian: پیرعلی, also Romanized as Pīr‘alī and Pīr ‘Alī) is a village in Dul Rural District, in the Central District of Urmia County, West Azerbaijan Province, Iran. At the 2006 census, its population was 370, in 96 families.
