= Honorary Diploma of the President =

Honorary award in Azerbaijan

Honorary diploma of the president of Azerbaijan is an award established in October 17, 2007. Which is awarded to the citizens and foreigners for their success in any relevant field.

== Laureates ==
Mikhail Yefimovich Shvydkoy was awarded with honorary diploma for his activities in the development of cultural relations between Russia and Azerbaijan in 2018. Joseph Kobzon also awarded with this diploma in 2017. The chairman of the House of Representatives of the National Congress of Brazil, Rordrigo Maya awarded with the Honorary Diploma of the President of Azerbaijan. Mikhail Yuryevich Zabel awarded with honorary diploma for his active participation in the public life of Azerbaijan. Latifa al-Fahd al-Salim al-Sabah, the chairman of the Committee of Women’s Affairs of Kuwait was awarded with honorary diploma for her contributions on relations between two countries. Polad Bülbüloğlu, Salman Musayev, Allahshukur Pashazadeh, Vagif Behbudov, Valeh Jafarov, and Yusif Yosibov were awarded for their activities in different fields.
