= Pir Ali, Chaharmahal and Bakhtiari =

Pir Ali پير عالي
- Village
- Location within Iran
- Coordinates: 32°46′00″N 49°35′00″E
- Country: Iran
- Province: Chaharmahal and Bakhtiari
- County: Kuhrang
- Bakhsh: Central
- Rural District: Miankuh-e Moguyi

Population (2006)
  - Total: 47
- Time zone: UTC+3:30 (IRST)
  - Summer (DST): UTC+4:30 (IRDT)

Pir Ali (Persian: پير عالي, also Romanized as Pīr ‘Alī; also known as Emāmzādeh Pīr ‘Alī and Pīr ‘Al) is a village in Miankuh-e Moguyi Rural District, in the Central District of Kuhrang County, Chaharmahal and Bakhtiari Province, Iran. At the 2006 census, its population was 47, in 11 families. The village is populated by Lurs.
