= Söyüdlü, Jalilabad =

Settlement in Jalilabad District, Azerbaijan

Söyüdlü is a village and municipality in the Jalilabad Rayon of Azerbaijan. It has a population of 738.
