= Bala Bəhmənli =

- Municipality
- Location within Azerbaijan Location within Karabakh Economic Region
- Coordinates: 39°34′N 47°35′E
- Country: Azerbaijan
- District: Fuzuli

Population
  - Total: 3,297
- Time zone: UTC+4 (AZT)

Bala Bəhmənli (also, Bala Begmenli and Bala-Bekhmanli) is a village and municipality in the Fuzuli District of Azerbaijan. It has a population of 3,297.
