= Qajariyeh-ye Yek =

Qajariyeh-ye Yek قجريه يك
- Village
- Location within Iran
- Coordinates: 31°01′51″N 48°22′13″E
- Country: Iran
- Province: Khuzestan
- County: Ahvaz
- Bakhsh: Central
- Rural District: Esmailiyeh

Population (2006)
  - Total: 800
- Time zone: UTC+3:30 (IRST)
  - Summer (DST): UTC+4:30 (IRDT)

Qajariyeh-ye Yek (Persian: قجريه يك, also Romanized as Qajarīyeh-ye Yek and Qajarīyeh Yek) is a village in Esmailiyeh Rural District, in the Central District of Ahvaz County, Khuzestan Province, Iran. At the 2006 census, its population was 800, in 149 families.
