= Binə Xocavar =

Village in Azerbaijan

Coordinates: 39°04′N 48°39′E

Binə Xocavar is a village and municipality in the Masally District of Azerbaijan. It has a population of 1,075.
