= Qəfərli =

Village in Azerbaijan

Coordinates: 40°01′14″N 48°32′37″E

Qəfərli is a village and municipality in the Sabirabad Rayon of Azerbaijan. It has a population of 434.
