= Pir Vali =

Pir Vali پیروالی
- Village
- Location within Iran
- Coordinates: 32°48′01″N 48°22′54″E
- Country: Iran
- Province: Khuzestan
- County: Andimeshk
- Bakhsh: Alvar-e Garmsiri
- Rural District: Qilab

Population (2006)
  - Total: 292
- Time zone: UTC+3:30 (IRST)
  - Summer (DST): UTC+4:30 (IRDT)

Pir Vali (Persian: پیروالی, also Romanized as Pīr Vālī; also known as Pīr ‘Alī) is a village in Qilab Rural District, Alvar-e Garmsiri District, Andimeshk County, Khuzestan Province, Iran. At the 2006 census, its population was 292, in 58 families.
