= Bala Söyüdlü =

- Location within Azerbaijan Location within Shaki-Zagatala Economic Region
- Coordinates: 40°52′03″N 47°33′43″E
- Country: Azerbaijan
- Rayon: Shaki
- Time zone: UTC+4 (AZT)
  - Summer (DST): UTC+5 (AZT)

Bala Söyüdlü (also, Bala Sëyudlyu) is a village in the Shaki Rayon of Azerbaijan.
