= Pirali, Fars =

Pirali پيرالي
- Village
- Location within Iran
- Coordinates: 30°19′26″N 51°36′38″E
- Country: Iran
- Province: Fars
- County: Mamasani
- Bakhsh: Central
- Rural District: Jowzar

Population (2006)
  - Total: 150
- Time zone: UTC+3:30 (IRST)
  - Summer (DST): UTC+4:30 (IRDT)

Pirali (Persian: پيرالي, also Romanized as Pīrālī) is a village in Jowzar Rural District, in the Central District of Mamasani County, Fars province, Iran. At the 2006 census, its population was 150, in 26 families.
