= Qaravəlli, Zardab =

Qaravəlli
- Municipality
- Location within Azerbaijan
- Coordinates: 40°10′34″N 47°46′29″E
- Country: Azerbaijan
- Rayon: Zardab

Population
  - Total: 794
- Time zone: UTC+4 (AZT)
  - Summer (DST): UTC+5 (AZT)

Qaravəlli (also, Qərəvəlli, Qaravəlili, Karavelli and Karavelyan) is a village and municipality in the Zardab Rayon of Azerbaijan. It has a population of 794.
