= Qaravəlli, Ismailli =

Kürdmaşı
- Location within Azerbaijan
- Coordinates: 40°40′15″N 48°02′00″E
- Country: Azerbaijan
- Rayon: Ismailli
- Time zone: UTC+4 (AZT)
  - Summer (DST): UTC+5 (AZT)

Kürdmaşı (also, Kürdmaşı) is a village in the Ismailli Rayon of Azerbaijan.
