= Kadzhar, Agsu =

Kadzhar
- Location within Azerbaijan
- Coordinates: 40°35′53″N 48°27′00″E
- Country: Azerbaijan
- Rayon: Agsu
- Time zone: UTC+4 (AZT)
  - Summer (DST): UTC+5 (AZT)

Kadzhar is a village in the Agsu Rayon of Azerbaijan.
