= İmamqulubəyli, Aghjabadi =

Village in Aghjabadi District, Azerbaijan

Coordinates: 40.0713°N 47.1673°E

İmamqulubəyli is a village and municipality in the Aghjabadi District of Azerbaijan. It has a population of 1,022.
