= Ali Pir Vali Muman =

Ali Pir Vali Muman عاليپيروعلي مومن
- Village
- Location within Iran
- Coordinates: 32°14′23″N 49°32′15″E
- Country: Iran
- Province: Khuzestan
- County: Andika
- Bakhsh: Central
- Rural District: Qaleh-ye Khvajeh

Population (2006)
  - Total: 156
- Time zone: UTC+3:30 (IRST)
  - Summer (DST): UTC+4:30 (IRDT)

Ali Pir Vali Muman (Persian: عاليپيروعلي مومن, also Romanized as ‘Ālī Pīr Vʿalī Mūman; also known as ‘Ālī Pīr) is a village in Qaleh-ye Khvajeh Rural District, in the Central District of Andika County, Khuzestan Province, Iran. At the 2006 census, its population was 156, in 29 families.
