= Şotlanlı, Agdam =

Şotlanlı
- Location within Azerbaijan Location within Karabakh Economic Region
- Coordinates: 40°14′12″N 46°57′28″E
- Country: Azerbaijan
- Rayon: Agdam
- Time zone: UTC+4 (AZT)
  - Summer (DST): UTC+5 (AZT)

Şotlanlı (also, Shotlanly) is a village in the Agdam District of Azerbaijan.
