= Söyüdlü, Jabrayil =

Söyüdlü
- Location within Azerbaijan
- Coordinates: 39°25′22″N 46°46′17″E
- Country: Azerbaijan
- District: Jabrayil

Population (2010)
  - Total: 54,430
- Time zone: UTC+4 (AZT)
  - Summer (DST): UTC+5 (AZT)

Söyüdlü (Soyudlu) is a village in the Jabrayil District of Azerbaijan.
