= Hüsülü, Aghjabadi =

Hüsülü
- Municipality
- Location within Azerbaijan Location within Karabakh Economic Region
- Coordinates: 40°04′17″N 47°17′56″E
- Country: Azerbaijan
- Rayon: Aghjabadi

Population
  - Total: 4,235
- Time zone: UTC+4 (AZT)
  - Summer (DST): UTC+5 (AZT)

Hüsülü (also, Gusyulyu and Gyusyulyu) is a village and municipality in the Aghjabadi Rayon of Azerbaijan. It has a population of 4,235.

Hüsülü lies within the Kura-Aras Lowland, a fertile region that stretches across central Azerbaijan. The area is largely flat, which makes it suitable for farming, livestock grazing, and horticulture. The climate is typically semi-arid, with hot summers and mild winters, consistent with much of the Aghjabadi region.
