= Qarah Vali, East Azerbaijan =

Qarah Vali قره ولي
- Village
- Location within Iran
- Coordinates: 36°59′53″N 47°17′26″E
- Country: Iran
- Province: East Azerbaijan
- County: Charuymaq
- Bakhsh: Shadian
- Rural District: Charuymaq-e Sharqi

Population (2006)
  - Total: 43
- Time zone: UTC+3:30 (IRST)
  - Summer (DST): UTC+4:30 (IRDT)

Qarah Vali (Persian: قره ولي, also Romanized as Qarah Valī and Qareh Valī) is a village in Charuymaq-e Sharqi Rural District, Shadian District, Charuymaq County, East Azerbaijan Province, Iran. At the 2006 census, its population was 43, in 8 families.
