= Böyük Muruq =

- Municipality
- Location within Azerbaijan
- Coordinates: 41°25′51″N 48°10′40″E
- Country: Azerbaijan
- Rayon: Qusar

Population
  - Total: 552
- Time zone: UTC+4 (AZT)
  - Summer (DST): UTC+5 (AZT)

Böyük Muruq (also, Bëyuk Murug and Beyuk-Murukh) is a village and municipality in the Qusar Rayon of Azerbaijan. It has a population of 552.
