= Kürdlər, Aghjabadi =

Kürdlər
- Municipality
- Location within Azerbaijan Location within Karabakh Economic Region
- Coordinates: 39°59′23″N 47°09′58″E
- Country: Azerbaijan
- Rayon: Aghjabadi

Population
  - Total: 891
- Time zone: UTC+4 (AZT)
  - Summer (DST): UTC+5 (AZT)

Kürdlər (also known as Kyurdlyar) is a village and municipality in the Aghjabadi Rayon of Azerbaijan. It has a population of 891.
