= Böyük Söyüdlü =

- Municipality
- Location within Azerbaijan Location within Shaki-Zagatala Economic Region
- Coordinates: 40°52′03″N 47°32′12″E
- Country: Azerbaijan
- Rayon: Oghuz

Population
  - Total: 1,198
- Time zone: UTC+4 (AZT)
  - Summer (DST): UTC+5 (AZT)

Böyük Söyüdlü (also, Bëyuk Sëyudlyu, Beyuk-Segutly, and Beyuk-Sogyutlyu, on russian Беюк Согутлы) is a village and municipality in the Oghuz Rayon of Azerbaijan. It has a population of 1,198.
