= Böyük Külatan =

Boyuk Kolatan
- Azerbaijani: Böyük Kolatan
- Location within Azerbaijan
- Coordinates: 38°57′58″N 48°39′09″E
- Country: Azerbaijan
- District: Masally
- Time zone: UTC+4 (AZT)
  - Summer (DST): UTC+5 (AZT)

Böyük Kolatan (also, Boyuk Kolatan, and Kolatan) is a village in the Masally District of Azerbaijan.
