= Böyük Bəhmənli =

- Municipality
- Location within Azerbaijan Location within Karabakh Economic Region
- Coordinates: 39°30′44″N 47°29′49″E
- Country: Azerbaijan
- District: Fuzuli

Population
  - Total: 6,171
- Time zone: UTC+4 (AZT)

Böyük Bəhmənli (also, Bëyuk Bekhmanli and Bëyuk-Bekhmenli) is a village and most populous municipality in the Fuzuli District of Azerbaijan. It has a population of 6,171.
