= Böyük Xocavar =

Village in Azerbaijan

Coordinates: 39°03′N 48°38′E

Böyük Xocavar (also, Boyuk Khojavar) is a village and municipality in the Masally District of Azerbaijan. It has a population of 2,139.
