= Qajariyeh-ye Do =

Qajariyeh-ye Do قجريه دو
- Village
- Location within Iran
- Coordinates: 31°01′09″N 48°21′32″E
- Country: Iran
- Province: Khuzestan
- County: Ahvaz
- Bakhsh: Central
- Rural District: Esmailiyeh

Population (2006)
  - Total: 153
- Time zone: UTC+3:30 (IRST)
  - Summer (DST): UTC+4:30 (IRDT)

Qajariyeh-ye Do (Persian: قجريه دو, also Romanized as Qajarīyeh-ye Do and Qajarīyeh Do; also known as Qājāniyeh, Qājār, and Qajarīyeh) is a village in Esmailiyeh Rural District, in the Central District of Ahvaz County, Khuzestan Province, Iran. At the 2006 census, its population was 153, in 27 families.
