= Böyük Pirəli =

- Municipality
- Location within Azerbaijan Location within Shaki-Zagatala Economic Region
- Coordinates: 40°54′41″N 47°48′08″E
- Country: Azerbaijan
- Rayon: Qabala

Population
  - Total: 1,362
- Time zone: UTC+4 (AZT)
  - Summer (DST): UTC+5 (AZT)

Böyük Pirəli (also, Beyuk-Pirelli, Beyuk-Piraly, and Bëyuk Pirali) is a village and municipality in the Qabala Rayon of Azerbaijan. As of 2014, it has a population of 1,362.
