= Böyük Həmyə =

- Municipality
- Location within Azerbaijan
- Coordinates: 41°06′32″N 49°08′45″E
- Country: Azerbaijan
- Rayon: Siazan

Population
  - Total: 1,752
- Time zone: UTC+4 (AZT)
  - Summer (DST): UTC+5 (AZT)

Böyük Həmyə (also, Arab Gam’ya and Bëyuk Gam’ya) is a village and municipality in the Siazan Rayon of Azerbaijan. It has a population of 1,752.
