= Böyük Əmili =

- Municipality
- Location within Azerbaijan Location within Shaki-Zagatala Economic Region
- Coordinates: 40°51′29″N 47°44′27″E
- Country: Azerbaijan
- Rayon: Qabala

Population
  - Total: 1,128
- Time zone: UTC+4 (AZT)
  - Summer (DST): UTC+5 (AZT)

Böyük Əmili (also, Bëyuk Emili) is a village and municipality in the Qabala Rayon of Azerbaijan. It has a population of 1,128.
