= Aghjabadi District =

District in central Azerbaijan

Coordinates: 40°3′10″N 47°27′41″E

- District
- Map of Azerbaijan showing Aghjabadi District
- Country: Azerbaijan
- Region: Karabakh
- Established: 8 August 1930
- Capital: Aghjabadi
- Settlements: 46

Government
  - Governor: Rafil Huseynov

Area
  - Total: 1,760 km^{2} (680 sq mi)

Population (2020)
  - Total: 136,800
  - Density: 77.7/km^{2} (201/sq mi)
- Time zone: UTC+4 (AZT)
- Postal code: 0400
- Website: agcabedi-ih.gov.az

Aghjabadi District (Azerbaijani: Ağcabədi rayonu) is one of the 66 districts of Azerbaijan. It is located in the centre of the country and belongs to the Karabakh Economic Region. The district borders the districts of Khojavend, Agdam, Barda, Zardab, Beylagan, and Fuzuli. Its capital and largest city is Aghjabadi. As of 2020, the district had a population of 136,800.

== History ==
Aghjabadi district was established on 8 August 1930. It was abolished and attached to the Aghdam District in 1963. Two years later, it was re-established as an independent district.

"Aghjabadi" means "large settlement" ("aghja" – large, "badi" – residence, settlement) in Azerbaijani. The ancient monuments discovered on the territory of Aghjabadi rayon attest to human habitation dating to the Eneolithic, Bronze Age periods. There are also remnants of the Middle Ages found at the Kamiltepe, Nargiztepe, Garakober, Yantepe, Galatepe and Gavur archaeological sites.

Among the remains of the Eneolithic Age are the cemetery and the residence site called "Kichik" on the kurgan barrow in the village of Boyat, ruins of an ancient settlement Yastitepe in the village of Hindarx, residence sites Akhanglitepe, Keshaltitepe, Jafargulutepe, Husulutepe in Hacılar village, ruins of Kamiltepe and Shahtepe settlements in Yeni Qaradolaq village, the archaeological sites of Sutepe, Agtepe and Janavartepe in Taynaq village, Mirvaritepe I and II, Abiltepe I and II, Muhammedtepe in the İmamqulubəyli municipality.

Archeological sites dating back to the Bronze Age include Kultepe, Saribashtepe, Uchtepe, Shahtepe in Agjabadi, Gyshaltitepe, Qebristanliqtepe, Galatepe in Boyat village, Elashantepe in Gələbədin, kurgan barrows Gushtepe, Huseinbey and Gazantepe in Hindarx village, and Sumuklu-tepe in Cəfərbəyli village.

Ancient living settlements have been discovered in Təzəkənd (5th-2nd millennia BC), Arazbar (1st millennium), Qiyaməddinli (1st millennium) and Hüsülü villages, as well as the Sangartepe and Toratepe living settlements found in Sarıcalı and Şənlik villages.

Several historical monuments, one school, the Regional Centre of Culture and a library were destroyed and burned by Armenian forces during the Karabakh War in Yuxarı Qiyaməddinli village.

== Etymology ==
Aghjabadi District has 45 villages. The main occupation in the villages is agriculture and animal husbandry.

The name of the village of Avshar of Aghjabadi is related to Oghuzs which has an ancient history. Avshars are the descendants of Ulduz Khan, son of Oguz Khan. The word "Avshar" means "brave". The area of the village of Avshar is 10.6 km^{2} and it has a population of 6406.

"Ashagi Avshar" village was settled at the beginning of the 20th century in the area named Kirov, with 5–10 families. The first resident of the village was Karbala Baghir. The village was named Ashagi Avshar, because the main population of the village was the Avshars who moved from Nargiztepe. The village of Ashaghi Avshar has an area of 940 square meters with a population of 1940.

The name of Agabayli village is related to the name of a person. In the 19th century, a man named Aghabey ruled the village. "Aghabayli" is a branch of the Kebirli tribe. The village of Agabayli is 5.3 square km with a population of 563.

The village of Aran is named due to its geographical location. The economy in these territories, which had very dry soils, increased in the early part of the 20th century by the laying of the channel named after Orchenikidze on the basis of the famous Gavur arch. By the end of the 1930s, the place of the village was moved to the present location in order to ensure the safety of the residents of the village when Kuraiver overflowed its banks and left its bed. The village has a population of 2078 and an area of 14.91 km^{2}.

The name of the village of Arazbar of Aghjabadi is written in the literature for the first time in the 13th century by Fazullah Rashideddin's "Letters". In the 18th century, Arasbar was a pasture for the animals of Ibrahimkhalil Agha, the father of Panah Ali Khan, the founder of the Karabakh khanate. The word "Arasbar" means "Planes around Araz". The population of the village of Arasbar with an area of 10.6 km^{2} is 1421 people.

The name of the village of Boyat of Aghjabedi is derived from the name of the Boyat (Bayat) tribe of the Seljuk's Oghuz. The Boyats are descendants of the son of Oguz Khan, Gyun Khan. The meaning of the word "bayat" is "1.rich, 2.old". Mohammed Fuzuli, Bayandur khan, Dede Gorgud belong to Bayat tribe. Boyat village was the first residence of the Karabakh Khanate and was ruled by Panahalikhan between 1747 and 1752. It has an area of 7.81 km^{2} and a population of 1781.

Jafarbayli village of Aghjabedi was established in 1885. The area of the village is 10.3 km^{2}. It has 934 residents.

The establishment of the village of Galebadin of Aghjabedi dates back to the first half of the 19th century. However, no fortress was recorded in that area. According to the village elders, these lands were formed by the first inhabitants of the village because of their sowing and cattle-breeding: - Come on, give it a living, that is, a good, good place. Later, this phrase became the name of the village. The village with a total area of 12,5 km^{2} has a population of 1368.

The name of the village of Goyuk is derived from the word "koyuk" meaning greenery, forest. The establishment of the village dates back to the 19th century. In the 1840s, the rural population was mainly engaged in cattle-breeding, migratory life. Later, they moved to their place of residence. The population of the village is derived from two generations. One of them is Mashadi Ali, a descendant of the Panahkhan who lived in the village of Sarijali in Aghdam. The village of Goyuk with an area of 10.2 square km has a population of 872.

The inhabitants of the village of Hajilar belong to the Zulgara tribe. In some sources the name of the village is related to the Turkish tribe called Hajilar, living in Eastern Anatolia. As the village was on the caravan routes, the residents have rested. That is why the village was named Hacilar (where the pilgrims had settled down). The village of Hacilar is 7.52 km^{2}, with a population of 1352 people.

The name of the village of Khojavand of Aghjabadi means "Khojaly generation" in scientific literature. The village was named after Khoja who settled first in this area. The existence of the village as a dwelling place is marked as the first half of the 18th century. The village of Khojavand with a total area of 23.4 km^{2} has a population of 3527.

The village of Imamgulubayli was settled by families belonging to the Garadolag tribe, which consisted of 104 families in the 19th century. The tsarist government granted the right to rule the city to the irrigated Imamgulubay. After that, the name of the village was called Imamgulubayli. It has population of 1146 and an area of 5.46 km^{2}.

The Kurds village was established as a result of the settlement of the Kurds of the Musanlı tribe. The formation of the village coincides with the second half of the 19th century. The first residents of the village were mainly engaged in cattle-breeding. The village has a population of 979 and an area of 779 square km.

The Garavalli village was formed as a result of the settlement of the Garavelli tribe. According to the local population, the name of the village is related to the name of one of the first inhabitants of this village called Kara Veli. That is why the village is called Garavelli. Garavalli village is selected according to the number of intellectuals in the region. Garavelli village has a population of 1814 square meters with a population of 3014 people.

The name of the village of Garakhanli is related to the name of Oykonim Garakhanli. One of the Oghuz tribes, Garanians belonging to bayans, settled in these places in 1865. Garakhanli village is named after this tirade. The Garakhanids were the most powerful tribal associations formed in the Western Turkestan in the Middle Ages. This tribal unity created the Garakhanids state and its first ruler was Abdelkarim Satuk Bugra Garakhan (940–955). The village of Garakhanli has a population of 921 people and an area of 5,5 km^{2}.

The name Muganli is related to the name of Mughanli, the Turkic-speaking Azerbaijani tribe. In the early 19th century, the tribe lived in the Mughan plains, and the area was named Mughanli. The village of Muganli with a population of 1667 has an area of 14.7.

The village of Najafkulubeyli was built in the 20th century near the Kura River. The name is related to the name of Najafkulubeyli from the Garadolak tribe. The village has a population of 1241and an area of 6.41 square kilometres.

== Geography ==
District is located 374 km from the capital Baku and 45 km from the closest town of Aghdam. The relief in Aghjabadi is plain. The soil is rich in clay. The climate is mild subtropical, warm and dry. The average monthly temperature in January is 1.2–1.7 °C and in August is 25–30 °C. Kura River flows on the north-eastern border of Aghjabadi District and Qarqar River flows through its central part. The Upper Karabakh channel also crosses the district. There are many salty lakes on the territory of Aghjabadi District, grey and grey soil is prevalent although the halophytic type of soil is also widespread.

=== Relief ===
The relief of the Aghjabadi district is plain, gradually rises from the north to the south-west, and the surface is composed of continental - Alluuar and sea sediments of anthropogenic systems. There are clay deposits in the area.

The Kur River in the north-eastern border of the district, about 45 km, flows through the Gargar River in the central part. Channels named Yukhari Garabagh and Khan gizi are going through the district.

There are some lakes in the area. Gray-grass, grey, grass-grey soils are spread. In the central part, there is also a land of salt and saline land. Reclamation works are being implemented in the district.

=== Nature ===
The Kur River flows through the north-eastern border and the Gargar River runs through the central part of the region. Yukhari (upper) Garabagh canal passes through the territory of the district. There is a lake in the area. There are shrubs and tugai forests locating on the Kura River. There are gazelle, wolves, jackal, fox, badgers, grey rabbits, small Asian mammals, and so on in the forests of the region. Birds: partridge, pigeon, shrubs, pheasants, etc. Aghgol National Park is located in the Agjabadi district. There are 15 species of animals, 20 species of fish and 40 species of plants.

Aghjabadi region is one of the big cattle-breeding regions of Azerbaijan. Thus, the number of cattle is 74.662 heads, including 36 043 caws, 303 830 sheep and goats (170 560 mother sheep), 1520 horse. 279 477 different species of poultry, goose, duck are kept in the region.

Aghgol National Park functions within the district as a tourism zone. Its area is 17.924 hectares, 8872 hectares of which is covered by water. Climate is mildly hot and dry subtropical.

== Demographics ==
There are 46 settlements and 1 town in the district. There is an airport and a railway station in the administrative center city of Aghjabadi. The population of Aghjabadi District is 122,649, according to the 2010 census. Out of them 46,919 live in the city and 75,730 live in the country. The trend (82,700 lived in the country in 2008) shows that there is rapid urbanization in the district. Out of the whole population, 62,310 are males and 60,339 are females. There is an increase in the birth rate too. In 2000, there were 1,659 newborns when in 2009 there were 2,377. Likewise, there were 491 new marriages in 2000 when there were 1,188 in 2009. A large part of Kurds who had fled from Armenia and Nagorno-Karabakh eventually settled in the district.

There are also 189 martyrs, 298 Garabagh war invalids, 776 Veterans of Garabagh War, 1 Great Patriotic War Veteran, and 1 Great Patriotic War invalid. Seven residents of the district were awarded the Honorary Title of Azerbaijan, and 735 were the Presidential scholarships. 2906 families (15.622 people) from Nagorno-Karabakh and other occupied territories (IDPs) temporarily settled in the Agjabadi district.

=== Population ===
According to the State Statistics Committee, as of 2018, the population of the city was 134,500 persons, having increased by 27,500 persons (about 25.2 percent) from 108,800 persons in 2000. Of the total population, 69,900 are men and 64,600 are women. More than 27 percent of the population (about 36,500 persons) consists of young people and teenagers aged 14–29.

The population of the district by the year (at the beginning of the year, thsd. persons)
Region	2000	2001	2002	2003	2004	2005	2006	2007	2008	2009	2010	2011	2012	2013	2014	2015	2016	2017	2018	2019	2020	2021
Agdjabadi region	108,8	109,8	110,7	111,8	113,1	114,7	116,3	117,9	119,5	121,3	122,7	124,0	125,7	127,3	128,7	130,3	131,9	133,3	134,5	135,5	136,8	137,5
urban population	34,0	34,4	34,8	35,2	35,8	36,4	36,9	37,4	38,0	46,6	46,8	47,3	47,7	48,1	48,4	48,9	49,2	49,6	49,8	50,1	50,4	50,6
rural population	74,8	75,4	75,9	76,6	77,3	78,3	79,4	80,5	81,5	74,7	75,9	76,7	78,0	79,2	80,3	81,4	82,7	83,7	84,7	85,4	86,4	86,9

== Economy ==
In accordance with the presidential order on "Regulation on Local Executive Power" the Council under Aghjabadi District Executive Power was established and its Statute was approved by the decree of the head of Aghjabadi District Executive Power dated 183, 2012. Meetings of the council are held at least twice a month in accordance with the "Regulations on Local Executive Power". Establishment of the Council aims to take control over and discuss economic, social, cultural and other local issues of the region.

People mainly work in the fields of health, education, culture, agriculture, industrial enterprises operating in the region, as well as trade and public catering.

There are 216 managerial and business enterprises in the region, 5 branches of banks, 4 non-bank credit organizations, 2 telecommunication enterprises and some hotels. The largest enterprises in the Agjabadi region include Atena LLC, BMS-Agro LLC, Aqat Agro LLC, Azapro-Takhil LLC, Agjabadi Cotton Processing Plant "MKT-İK" Agro "Cotton Processing Plant," MKT-İK "LLC Innovation Branch, Automobile Repair Plant, Mobile Mechanized Group, Road Exploitation Unit, Automobile base, Cargo Automobile base, Subartesian Wells Exploitation Unit, Aghgol State reserve, Post office, Telecommunication, Forest Melioration Station, Melioration Unit, Gunash villager farm, Azerbaijan firm, Cooperative society, Town Trade Association, Water Sukanal Office, Biyan Ltd., Central market, Social defence Fund, Cocoon Unit, Veterinary Unit.

The number of employed people in the region is 71,108, including 821 employees in the industry, 32904 in agriculture, 654 in construction, 184 in transport and communication, 5841 in education, culture and arts, health, physical education and 1145 in the field of social security, and 54 people in crediting finance and insurance, 812 in administrative bodies, 3361 in trade and service sectors and 25 thousand in other fields.

In 2017 the total volume of the product launch in the main branches of the economy in the region was 481 thousand manats.

The volume of the product launch in the main branches of the economy in 2017 amounted to 29368 manats in industry. 166 126 2 manats in the field of agriculture, 203685 manats in the field of construction, 598 thousand manats in the field of transport, 790 thousand manats in the field of communication, and 75154 6 manats in the field of trade.

Between 2017 and 2018 new water supply system was constructed in the Aghjabadi district within the framework of a joint project between the United States and Azerbaijan. As a result of the implementation of the project, 201 families got access to high-quality drinking water.

== Notable natives ==
- Uzeyir Hajibeyov – composer
- Inqilab Nadirli – writer
- Afrasiyab Badalbeyli – composer and conductor
- Shamsi Badalbeyli – composer
- Tofik Bakhramov – football referee
- Zulfu Adigozalov – khananda
- Vasif Adigozalov – composer
- Isi Malikzadeh – writer
- Sabir Novruzov – mugham singer
- Ramiz Adigozalov - composer
- Mutallim Mutallimov - singer
- Yagub Mammadov - singer
- Shamil Jamshid -scientist-orientalist
- Hadjimammadhuseyn Hadjiyev - scientist bred Garadolag sheep species
- Faghan Aliyev - PhD of Technical Science
- Aghakishi Kazimov - professor
- Khagani Mammadov - professor
- Elbrus Ahmadov - scientist
- Ajdar - poet, scientist
