= Barda District =

District in central Azerbaijan

Coordinates: 40.3667°N 47.1167°E

- District

- Map of Azerbaijan showing Barda District
- Country: Azerbaijan
- Region: Karabakh
- Established: 8 August 1930
- Capital: Barda
- Settlements: 111

Government
  - Governor: Vedad Isayev

Area
  - Total: 950 km^{2} (370 sq mi)

Population (2020)
  - Total: 157,500
  - Density: 170/km^{2} (430/sq mi)
- Time zone: UTC+4 (AZT)
- Postal code: 0900
- Website: berde-ih.gov.az

Barda District (Azerbaijani: Bərdə rayonu) is one of the 66 districts of Azerbaijan. It is located in the center of the country in the Karabakh Economic Region. The district borders the districts of Tartar, Agdam, Aghjabadi, Zardab, Agdash, and Yevlakh. Its capital and largest city is Barda. As of 2020, the district had a population of 157,500.

== History ==
Materials and coins found in archaeological excavations related to the period of Alexander the Great, Arakis, and Empire of Rome prove that the center of the district (Barda city) is one of the oldest centers, not only in Azerbaijan but also in the Middle East. According to 9th-century Arabian historian Al-Baladhuri, Barda was established in the period of Kavadh I, who was a Sassanid ruler, while according to 14th-century Iranian historian Hamdallah Mustawfi it was from the period of Alexander the Great (336–323 BC).

Barda became the center of the region ruled by the governor during the Sassanid period. During the reign of Kavadh I, Barda was surrounded by fortress walls. It was the capital of Albania in the 10th century. The center of the Albanian church was moved to Barda in 552 and was occupied by Iranian feudalists in 639. Thereafter, Barda received autonomy with the help of Javanshir, who was the ruler of Alban. It became a central part of Arran Province in 752. Barda was part of the Sassanid state until the 890s.

The remains of cultural items from the 2nd millennium BC to the late Middle Ages have been found and preserved in Barda. The cultural items include a Barda tomb built in 1322, remains of old city walls from the 6th century, the Ibrahim Mosque (18th-century cemetery), two bridges from the 7th–9th centuries on the Tartar River, the Axsadan Baba tomb of the 14th century, and an eight-point tomb in the village of Guloghlular from the 18th century. All of these findings are well-preserved by the government. In addition, the Juma mosque (built in Barda city in 1905), a 19th-century bathhouse, the 19th-century Ugurbeyli Mosque, the Bahman Mirza Mausoleum, and other historical and architectural monuments were found in Shirvanli village.

Barda consisted of two parts: Shahristan and Rabad. The city center was in Shahristan, which was surrounded by fortress walls. Meanwhile, there were craftsmen, merchants, and caravanserais in the place called Rabat.

Barda District was established in 1930 as an independent administrative unit.

== Monuments ==
Historical monuments left to date are as follows:

- Ibrahim Mosque (built in the 8th–9th centuries)
- Bayram Mirza Tomb
- “Akhsadan baba” Tomb
- Barda Tomb
- “Torpag gala”
- Juma Mosque
- 2 bridges over Tartar river

== Economy ==
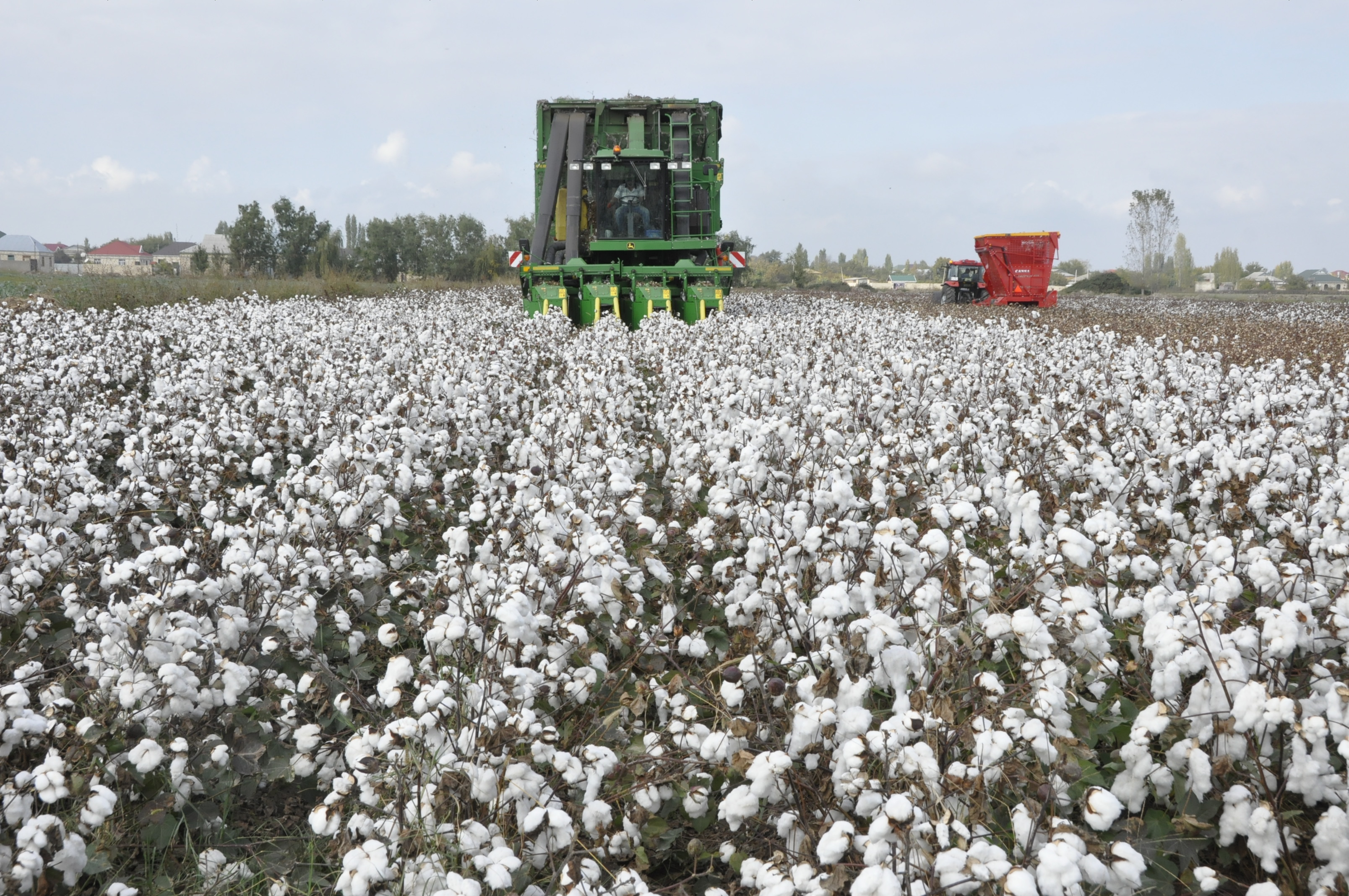
Cotton plantation in Barda District

Barda is well-developed agriculturally. The main agricultural sectors include grain and cotton growing. The economy is primarily based upon cattle-breeding, vegetable growing, and silkworm breeding.

Barda District has a developed industry. There are “Yag-Pendir” (“Butter-Cheese”) and “Garabag-Pambig” (“Grabag-Cotton”) OSJCs, cannery, etc. functioning in the district.

The district runs education, health, social, recreational and public catering facilities.

== Population ==
The population of the district was 143.9 thousand people until January 1, 2011. According to the official information dated January 6, 2012, the population of the region is 147,700. Among the residents, there are 222 Karabakh war invalids, 438 martyrs, 884 Karabakh war veterans and 41 Great Patriotic War veterans.

Population
Ethnic group	census, 2009
Total	141 646
Azerbaijanis	141 485
Turkish people	97
Russians	48
Ukrainians	5
Tatars	5
Others	6

According to the State Statistics Committee, as of 2018, the population of city recorded 155,400 persons, which increased by 24,800 persons (about 18.9 percent) from 130,600 persons in 2000. Of the total population, 78,900 are men and 76,500 are women. More than 25.8 percent of the population (about 40,100 persons) consists of young people and teenagers aged 14–29.

The population of the district by the year (at the beginning of the year, thousand persons)
Region	2000	2001	2002	2003	2004	2005	2006	2007	2008	2009	2010	2011	2012	2013	2014	2015	2016	2017	2018	2019	2020	2021
Barda region	130,6	131,6	132,6	133,6	134,7	136,1	137,6	138,7	140,0	141,4	142,4	143,9	146,6	148,1	149,5	151,2	152,7	154,2	155,4	156,3	157,5	158,2
urban population	36,1	36,2	36,5	36,7	36,9	37,2	37,5	37,5	37,6	37,8	37,9	38,1	38,5	38,8	38,9	39,3	39,5	39,8	39,9	40,0	40,2	40,3
rural population	94,5	95,4	96,1	96,9	97,8	98,9	100,1	101,2	102,4	103,6	104,5	105,8	108,1	109,3	110,6	111,9	113,2	114,4	115,5	116,3	117,3	117,9

The population of the district by sex (at the beginning of 2018, thsd. persons)
Towns and regions	Total	including:		urban places	including:		rural places	including:	
Towns and regions	Total	men	women	urban places	men	women	rural places	men	women
Barda district	155,4	78,9	76,5	39,9	19,7	20,2	115,5	59,2	56,3
Barda city	39,9	19,7	20,2	39,9	19,7	20,2	-	-	-

== Geographical location ==
Barda city is located on the Kur-Araz lowland, 87 meters above sea level, in the center of the Karabakh plain. The region is bordered by the Tartar region in the west, Yevlakh region in the north, Aghdash region in the north-east and the east, Zardab region in the south-east along the Kur River and the Aghdam and Aghjabadi regions in the south.

== Infrastructure ==
Barda bus station

The Yevlakh-Agdam railway, the Yevlakh-Lachin-Nakhchivan and Yevlakh-Agjabedi motorways pass through the region.
