= Battle of Hadrut =

Battle in the Second Nagorno-Karabakh War

- Part of the Second Nagorno-Karabakh War
- Map of the battle as of 20 October 2020: Controlled by Armenia Controlled by Azerbaijan Disputed (For a more detailed map, see military situation in the Second Nagorno-Karabakh War)
Date	Urban warfare: 7 October 2020 – 15 October 2020 (1 week and 1 day); Rural and mountainous warfare: 15 October 2020 – 30 October 2020 (2 weeks and 1 day)
Location	Hadrut, Nagorno-Karabakh
Result	Azerbaijani victory
Territorial changes	Azerbaijani forces take control of Hadrut, and several villages and heights surrounding it.

Belligerents
Azerbaijan	Artsakh; Armenia

Commanders and leaders
Hikmat Mirzayev; Kanan Seyidov	Vahagn Asatryan †; Karen Ayrapetyan †

Casualties and losses
Per Azerbaijan: Unspecified; Per Artsakh: Unspecified	Per Artsakh: Per Azerbaijan: At least 38 servicemen killed; Units: 1 command post destroyed; 14 T-72s destroyed; 3 BMP-2s destroyed; 11 other vehicles destroyed; 17 BM-21 Grad MLRS destroyed; 7 artillery pieces destroyed; 15 D-1, D-20, and D-30 howitzers destroyed; 5 2S1 Gvozdika howitzers destroyed; 3 2A36 Giatsint-B guns destroyed; Su-25 downed; 3 UAVs downed; 13 air defense systems destroyed; 1 ZSU-23-4 Shilka destroyed; 1 radar station destroyed; 7 ammunition trucks destroyed; 22 other vehicles
- 11 Armenian civilians killed (per Artsakh) 1 Azerbaijani medical worker injured (per Azerbaijan)

The Battle of Hadrut (Azerbaijani: Hadrut döyüşü; Armenian: Հադրութի ճակատամարտ, romanized: Hadrut’i chakatamart) began in early October 2020 in Hadrut and its surrounding villages and heights, now seat of Khojavend District, Azerbaijan, and earlier controlled by the self-proclaimed Republic of Artsakh and was part of Hadrut Province.

Following Azerbaijan's capture of the city of Jabrayil, and claiming full dominance of the district of the same name, the Azerbaijani forces advanced north, to Hadrut. Heavy artillery fights took place starting from 7 October, and on 9 October, the Azerbaijani forces took control of strategically essential villages and heights just beside the town. Initially both parties claimed presence in the town however third-party sources indicated that the Azerbaijani forces had taken control of Hadrut on 14 or 15 October. In the meanwhile, more fights took place in north and west of the town, in contest of more important villages and heights until 30 October, when third-party sources confirmed the presence of Azerbaijani forces in a valley north of the town.

== Background ==
Hadrut is a town located in south-west Azerbaijan, within the breakaway Nagorno-Karabakh region. From 10 September 1939, Hadrut was the capital of Hadrut District within the Nagorno-Karabakh Autonomous Oblast of the Azerbaijan Soviet Socialist Republic until the abolishment of the Autonomous Oblast on 26 November 1991 after the dissolution of the Soviet Union. During the First Nagorno-Karabakh War, in 1991, the Azerbaijani residents of Hadrut had to leave the town due to inter-ethnic conflict. In May of the same year, as part of Operation Ring, Soviet Internal Security Forces and OMON forcibly deported hundreds of Armenians living in the town. The town came under the control of the Nagorno-Karabakh Defense Army on 2 October 1992. Hadrut's location is strategically important and connects southern parts of Karabakh to Stepanakert and Shusha.

== Prelude ==
On 27 September 2020, clashes broke out in the disputed Nagorno-Karabakh region, which was de facto controlled by the self-proclaimed and unrecognized Republic of Artsakh, but de jure part of Azerbaijan. Two days later, Azerbaijani officials stated their forces destroyed an Armenian command-and-observation post in Hadrut.

On 1 October, Artsakh authorities stated that Hadrut was being shelled by Azerbaijani artillery. The Azerbaijani MoD stated that Azerbaijani forces were striking military facilities, namely the headquarters of the 18th Motorized Rifle Division, as well as the infrastructure of the 1st Motorized Rifle Regiment of the aforementioned division. The following day, Artsakh authorities stated that the Azerbaijani forces targeted Hadrut with Smerch MLRS twice.

On 4 October Azerbaijani President Aliyev announced that Azerbaijani forces had taken control of the city of Jabrayil as well as several settlements in Jabrayil District. On 7 October, the Azerbaijani MoD stated that the Azerbaijani forces were in control of Jabrayil District, just south of the town.

== Battle ==
On 5 October, the Azerbaijani MoD stated that a battalion of the 1st Armenian Motorized Rifle Regiment, stationed in Hadrut, had fled. On 7 October, the Armenian authorities stated that the Azerbaijani forces were shelling Hadrut with heavy artillery.

On 9 October, at approximately 17:00, the Azerbaijani President announced that Azerbaijani forces had taken control of Hadrut, together with Əfəndilər, Qışlaq, Sor in south, Qaracallı, Süleymanlı, Yuxarı Güzlək, and Gorazıllı in the south-east of the town; This was denied by the self-proclaimed President of Artsakh, Arayik Harutyunyan, who stated that the Artsakh Defence Army was in full control of Hadrut. "Komsomolskaya Pravda", and "BBC Russian Service" also contested Aliyev's statements, stating that the town was under Azerbaijani control.

Just before 04:00 (00:00 GMT) on October 10, Russia reported that both Armenia and Azerbaijan had agreed on a humanitarian ceasefire after 10 hours of talks in Moscow (the Moscow Statement) and announced that both would enter "substantive" talks. Hostilities were formally halted at 12:00 (08:00 GMT), to allow an exchange of prisoners and the recovery of the dead, facilitated by the International Committee of the Red Cross (ICRC). Nevertheless, the ceasefire was heavily violated by the both sides, leading to the ICRC halting attempts to recover the dead and exchange wounded and prisoners.

Armenia and Azerbaijan accused each other of bombarding civilian settlements prior to the ceasefire, with both sides denying the other's accusations. Each side also accused the other of breaking the ceasefire. On 10 October, heavy fighting occurred in Hadrut, accompanied by shelling, with Azerbaijan moving deeper into the conflict zone. According to the Foreign Ministry of Artsakh, an operation to neutralize an Azerbaijani "sabotage and reconnaissance group" was underway in Hadrut. This group reportedly consisted of 200 men and infiltrated the town from both sides. According to Hadrut authorities, Azerbaijani attack on Hadrut was not supported by either artillery fire or tanks, and the group's goal was to "fix its presence." Both Artsakh and Azerbaijan accused each other of attacking Hadrut, where both parties claimed a presence. The BBC Russian Service reported that the town was under Armenian control. In the evening, the Azerbaijani MoD stated that the Azerbaijani forces had repelled an Armenian offensive from Tuğ.

On 12 October, Azerbaijani President Aliyev stated that all the neighborhoods of Hadrut were under Azerbaijani control, and that Armenian Special Forces had tried to retake the town, but had been defeated. Meanwhile, the Armenian MoD stated that the town was under Armenian control, with Azerbaijani forces constantly attempting to make inroads into the town. The Armenian Prime Minister, Nikol Pashinyan, later stated that military operations were occurring in the vicinity of Hadrut. The next day, the Azerbaijani MoD released footage claimed to have been shot from Hadrut's center, but a BBC Russian Service correspondent alleged that the footage was limited to neighboring heights and Tagaser, not Hadrut's center. The next day, the Azerbaijani MoD stated that the situation in Hadrut had remained tense.

On 14 October, the Azerbaijani MoD stated its forces had seized control of the settlement of Edişə in the west, together with Düdükçü, Ciraquz, and Edilli in the north of Hadrut. On 16 October, the Armenian MoD stated that Tuğ and Qırmızı Bazar were being shelled by Azerbaijani forces. The same day, Azerbaijan stated it had seized control of Xırmancıq and Ağbulaq to the north of Hadrut, and Axullu in the north-east of Hadrut, while the Azerbaijani MoD released footage apparently showing Hadrut and surrounding villages under Azerbaijani control. The Armenian MoD reiterated that they were still in control of Hadrut, but the Armenian authorities avoided providing a concrete answer to the questions of a BBC Russian Service correspondent regarding which side controlled the town.

On 17 October, the Azerbaijani MoD stated that the situation in Hadrut remained tense. On 18 October, an RIA Novosti correspondent reported an exchange of heavy artillery near Hadrut. Subsequently, the Azerbaijani MoD claimed to have downed an Armenian Su-25 warplane in the region; Armenia issued a denial. The next day, the Azerbaijani MoD stated that the situation in Hadrut and the surrounding areas were relatively stable but then stated that the Azerbaijani forces continued combat operations against the Armenian forces in the surroundings of the town and penetrated their defences. Approximately one hour later, it stated that Armenian forces had attacked Azerbaijani lines around the town but had been repelled. In the evening, the Azerbaijani authorities released images demonstrating a presence within the town. On 20 October, beginning in the morning, heavy clashes occurred near Hadrut, with Azerbaijani offensives taking place, accompanied by artillery support. Two days later, the Azerbaijani MoD stated that the Armenian volunteers recently arrived to the north of Hadrut had fled, while Artsakh authorities stated that clashes were taking place in Qirmizi Bazar, about 30 kilometres (19 mi) north of Hadrut. On 23 October, clashes occurred near Hadrut. On 27 October, the Armenian MoD stated that the Azerbaijani forces were shelling Khojavend; Azerbaijan issued a denial.

== Casualties ==
=== Civilian ===
As of 19 October, Armenian authorities reported 11 Armenian civilians killed in Hadrut and in surroundings areas during the battle; as of 10 October, Azerbaijani authorities reported one Azerbaijani medical worker seriously injured from shellfire.

=== Military ===
As of 19 October, Azerbaijani authorities stated that at least 38 Armenian servicemen had been killed in an ambush, but that more were subsequently killed. Also, Azerbaijani authorities claimed the destruction of one command post, 14 T-72s, three BMP-2s, 22 other vehicles, 17 BM-21 "Grad" MLRS, seven artillery pieces, 15 D-1, D-20, and D-30 howitzers, five 2S1 "Gvozdika" howitzers, three 2A36 Hyacinth-B guns, three UAVs downed, 13 air defense systems destroyed, one ZSU-23-4 Shilkas, one radar station, and seven ammunition trucks.

After the signing of the trilateral peace deal, Arayik Harutyunyan, the self-proclaimed President of Artsakh stated that during the battle approximately 1000-1500 Armenian soldiers fled Hadrut.

=== War crime allegation ===
On 15 October, a video surfaced of two captured Armenians, 25-year-old Yuri Adamyan and 73-year-old Benik Hakobyan, being executed in Hadrut by Azerbaijani soldiers; Artsakh authorities identified Hakobyan as a civilian of Hadrut. The Armenian representation in the European Court of Human Rights stated that they were investigating filing an official complaint with the court. Bellingcat analysed the videos and concluded that the footage was real and that both the executed were Armenian combatants captured by Azerbaijani forces between 9 and 15 October and then executed. The BBC corroborated Bellingcat's investigation of the execution.
