= Karadzhally =

Karadzhally may refer to:

- Çardaqlı, Qubadli, Azerbaijan
- Karadzhaly, Azerbaijan

== See also ==
- Qaracallı (disambiguation)
