= Əfəndilər =

Əfəndilər or Efendilyar may refer to:

- Əfəndilər, Jabrayil, Azerbaijan
- Əfəndilər, Qubadli, Azerbaijan
