= Süleymanlı (disambiguation) =

Süleymanlı can refer to:

- Süleymanlı
- Süleymanlı, Azerbaijan
- Süleymanlı, Buldan
- Süleymanlı, Çankırı
- Süleymanlı, Manyas
- Süleymanlı, Oltu
