= Martunashen =

Martunashen (Armenian for "town of Martuni") may refer to:

- Vanadzor, Armenia (known as Martunashen 1926–1935)
- Qarabulaq, Goygol, Azerbaijan
- Qaracallı, Qubadli, Azerbaijan
