= Güzlək =

Güzlək or Küzlək may refer to:

- Aşağı Güzlək, Azerbaijan
- Yuxarı Güzlək, Azerbaijan
