= Qaracallı =

Qaracallı or Karajali may refer to:

- Qaracallı, Jabrayil, Azerbaijan
- Qaracallı, Khachmaz, Azerbaijan
- Qaracallı, Qubadli, Azerbaijan
- Qaracallı, Ujar, Azerbaijan
