= Sar Sargsyan =

Sar Sargsyan Սար Սարգսյան
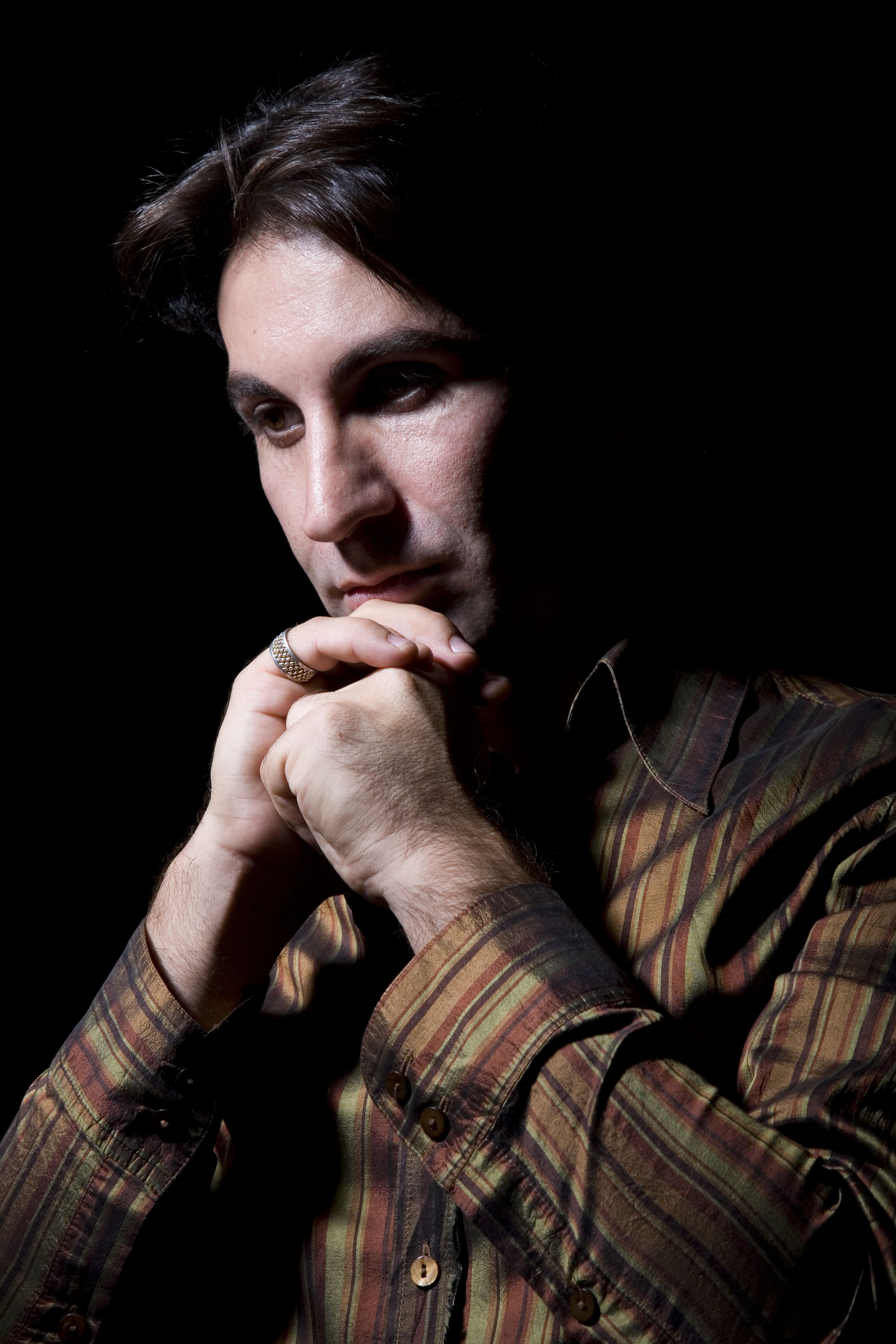
- Sar Sargsyan

Background information
- Born: Saribek Sargsyan; March 19, 1981 (age 45); Hadrut, Nagorno-Karabakh
- Genres: Classical, Classical Crossover, Operatic Pop
- Occupation: Baritone
- Website: sarsargsyan.com

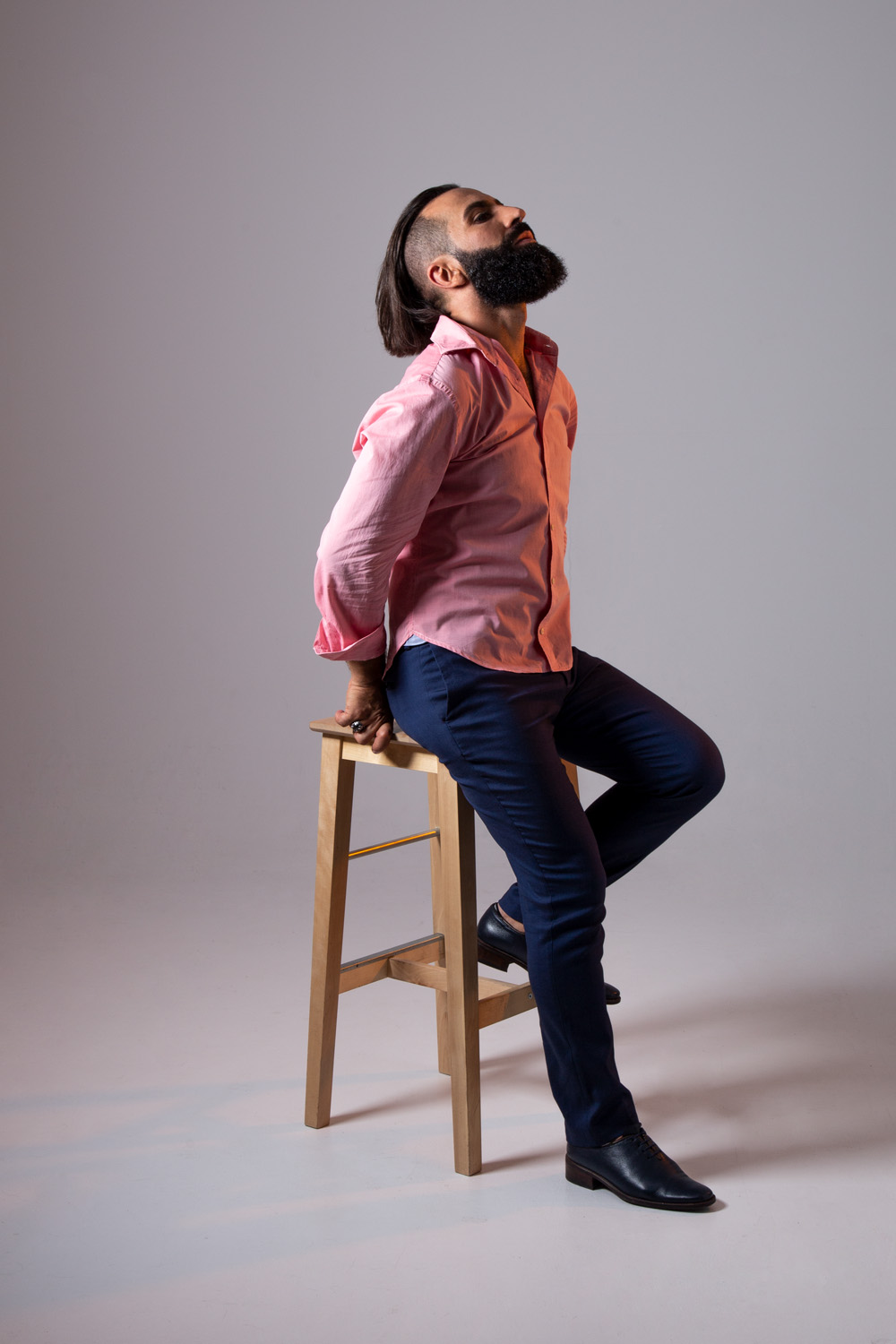
Sar Sargsyan

Saribek Edvardi Sargsyan (Armenian: Սարիբեկ Էդուարդի Սարգսյան, commonly known as Sar Sargsyan / Armenian: Սար Սարգսյան) born 19 March 1981 in Hadrut, Nagorno-Karabakh, is an Armenian baritone singer.

== Biography ==
Sar Sargsyan was born on 19 March 1981 in the town of Hadrut in Nagorno-Karabakh (Artsakh). He started his musical education at the Komitas School of Music in Hadrut. In 2002, Sar graduated from the vocal faculty of the Sayat-Nova College of Music in the city of Stepanakert led by Svetlana Aghadzhanyan. In 2007, he completed a course at the vocal faculty of the Komitas State Conservatory of Yerevan led by Professor Svetlana Kolosaryan, followed by post-graduate studies at the same school a year later, again under the supervision of Professor S. Kolosaryan.

Sar Sargsyan has performed extensively, including at multiple concerts and shows in Nagorno-Karabakh, Armenia, Georgia, Russia, Ukraine, Bulgaria, the US, UAE, Poland, Italy, Spain, Croatia, Lithuania, Latvia, China, in Greece and other countries. His solo programs were presented at the summer festivals of culture in Poland, “Polonia Cantans” and "ArtPark" (in 2016 and 2017).

His first solo CD recording, “Karot” (Longing), was published in 2012.

The vocalist has released 2 music videos based on Romanos Melikyan's songs "Rose" (2010) and Vagharshak Kotoyan's "Like a Dream" (2011) directed by Artyom Hakobyan.

Sar is the initiator and Artistic Director of the Irena Santor "Vistula Sounds"International Festival in Bydgoszcz (Poland).

The repertoire covers works by Armenian, Russian and European composers. Apart from the classical pieces, Sar also performs a variety of well-known and popular songs.

Sar Sargsyan makes frequent appearances on judge panels at international vocal competitions.

Since 2017 has lived in Poland on a permanent basis.

== Prizes ==
- Award winner at the 2nd Nationwide Festival of the Russian Song "The favourite songs of Russia", Armenia 2012
- Prize winner at the 6th International Festival "Renaissance", Armenia 2014
- Winner of the Grand Prix at the 3rd International Song Contest "Victoria", Poland 2014
- Winner of the Grand Prix at the 4th International Song Contest "Abanico 2015", Bulgaria 2015
- Winner of the gold medal at the 18th International Festival "Chorus Inside Summer 2015", Italy 2015
- Winner of the Grand Prix and gold medal at the 19th International Festival "Chorus Inside Croatia 2015", Croatia 2015
- Winner of the "Classics" category at the 15th International Contest of Young Talent "Kaunas Talent 2015", Lithuania 2015
- Winner of the Grand Prix and 1st Place at the International Festival "Gran Fiesta 2016", Spain 2016
- 1st place at the International Song Contest "Music League Talent 2016", Lithuania 2016
- Holder of certificates from the Ministry of the Diaspora of Armenia, for participation in the festivals "My Armenia" (2012, 2016) and "Komitas Vardapet" (2013), Armenia
- 1st place at the International Vocal Contest "Sofia Gran Prix 2017", Bulgaria 2017.
