= Karmir Shuka =

Place in Khojavend, Azerbaijan

Karmir Shuka / Girmizi Bazar Կարմիր Շուկա / Qırmızı Bazar
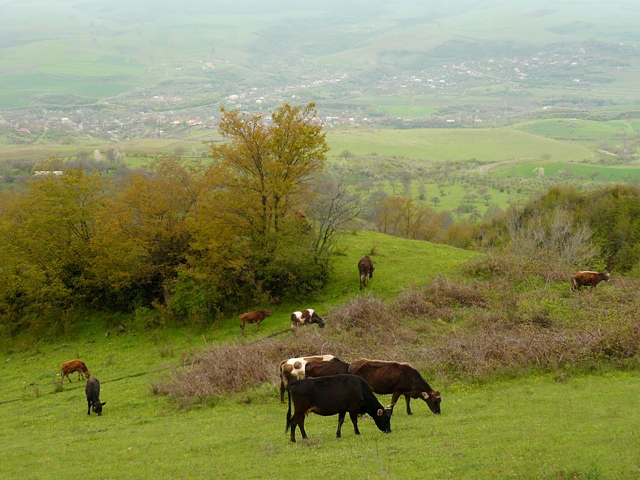

- Location within Azerbaijan Location within Karabakh Economic Region
- Coordinates: 39°40′33″N 46°56′55″E
- Country: Azerbaijan
  - District: Khojavend

Population (2015)
  - Total: 1,113
- Time zone: UTC+4 (AZT)

Karmir Shuka (Armenian: Կարմիր Շուկա) or Girmizi Bazar (Azerbaijani: Qırmızı Bazar) is a village in the Khojavend District of Azerbaijan, in the region of Karabakh. Until 2023 it was controlled by the breakaway Republic of Artsakh. The village had an ethnic Armenian-majority population until the expulsion of the Armenian population of Nagorno-Karabakh by Azerbaijan following the 2023 Azerbaijani offensive in Nagorno-Karabakh.

== Etymology ==
The name of the village was Krasny Bazar (Russian: Красный Базар) during the Soviet Union, meaning "Red Market" in Russian. The Armenian name, and the Azerbaijani rendering, also mean "Red Market".

== History ==
During the Soviet period, the village was a part of the Martuni District of the Nagorno-Karabakh Autonomous Oblast.

== Historical heritage sites ==
Historical heritage sites in and around the village include Tnjri, a 2,000-year-old Oriental Plane, the 12th/13th-century village of Mavas (Armenian: Մավաս), a 12th/13th-century khachkar, a cemetery from between the 17th and 18th centuries, the 17th-century monastic complex of Yerek Mankuk (Armenian: Երեք մանկուք) in Mavas, the church of Surb Astvatsatsin (Armenian: Սուրբ Աստվածածին, lit. 'Holy Mother of God') built in 1731 near the nearby village of Skhtorashen, and the 18th-century St. George's Chapel Church (Armenian: Սուրբ Գևորգ մատուռ-եկեղեցի, romanized: Surb Gevorg Matur-Yekeghetsi).

== Economy and culture ==
The population is mainly engaged in agriculture and animal husbandry. As of 2015, the village has a municipal building, a house of culture, a secondary school, a kindergarten, eight shops, and a medical centre. The community of Karmir Shuka includes the village of Skhtorashen.

== Demographics ==
The village had 926 inhabitants in 2005, and 1,113 inhabitants in 2015.

As of December 2025, 85 Azerbaijani families, totaling 344 individuals, have been resettled in Girmizi Bazar by Azerbaijan.

== Gallery ==
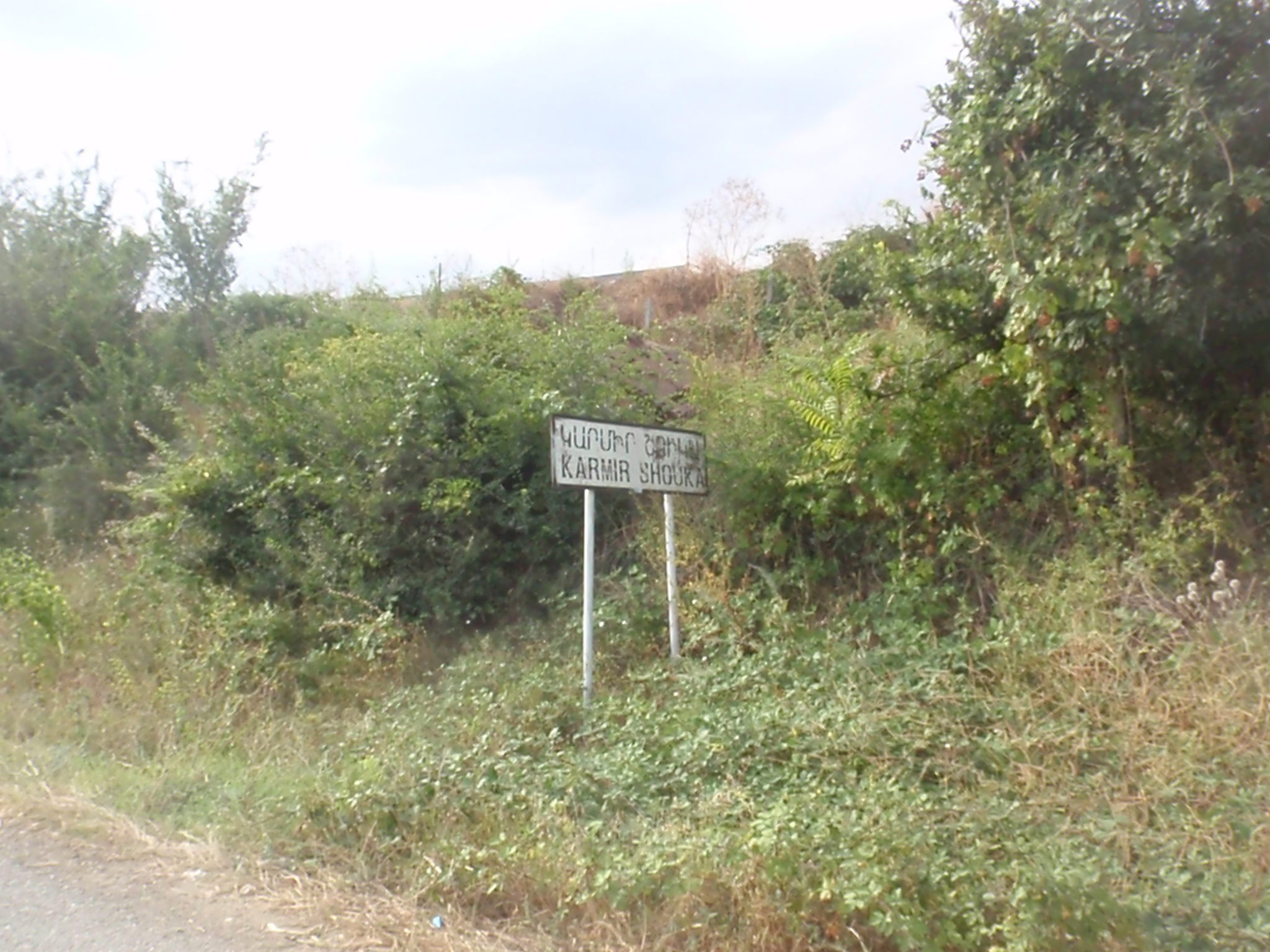
A sign at the entrance of the village on the north–south highway in Nagorno-Karabakh.

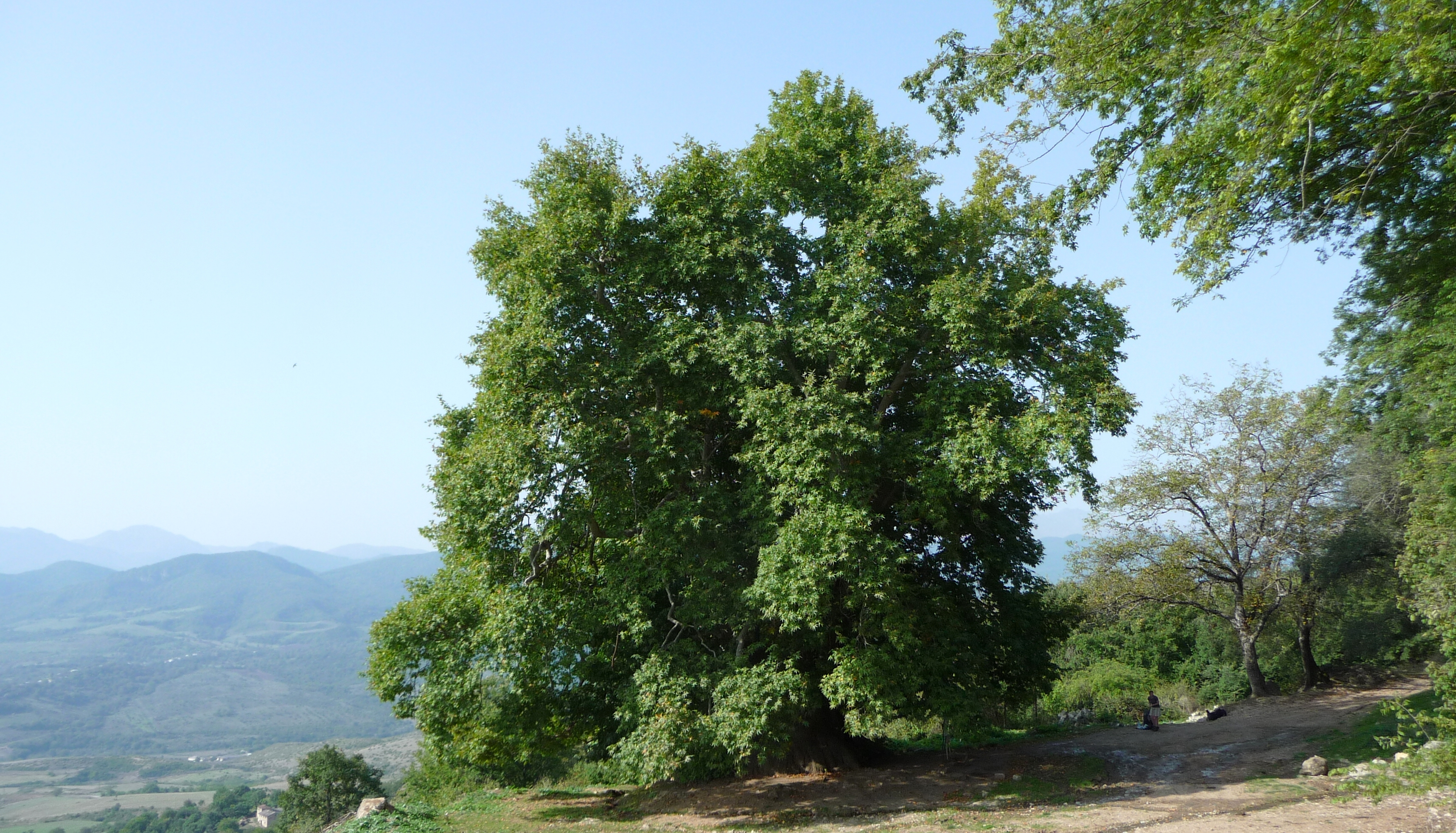
Tnjri, a 2,000-year-old Oriental Plane between the village and Skhtorashen.
