= Çinarlı, Khojavend =

Chinarly / Vank Çinarlı • Վանք
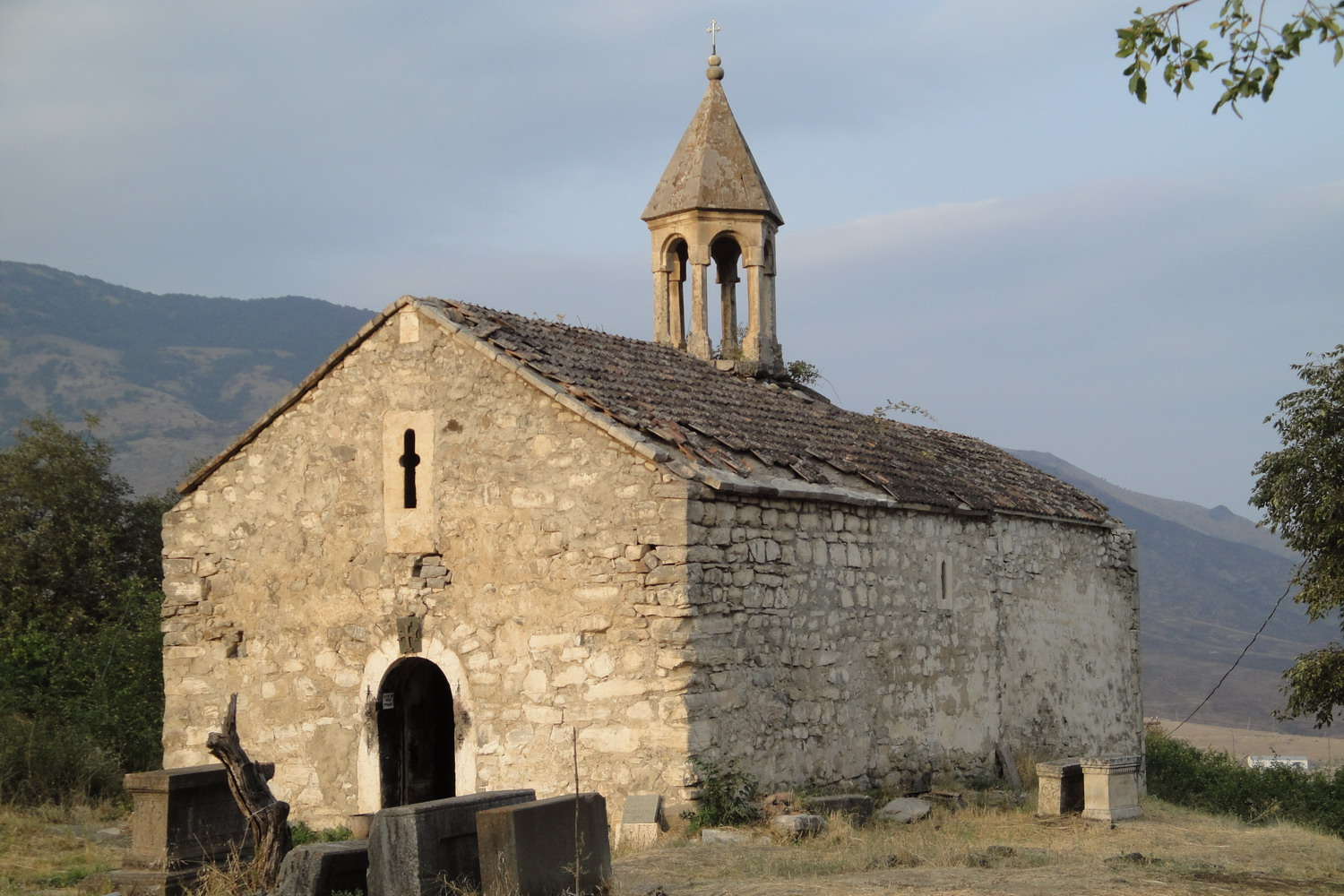
- The 14th-century church of Spitak Khach located on a hill to the north of the village, on the road towards Hadrut

- Location within Azerbaijan Location within Karabakh Economic Region
- Coordinates: 39°30′38″N 47°01′00″E
- Country: Azerbaijan
- District: Khojavend

Population (2015)
  - Total: 122
- Time zone: UTC+4 (AZT)

Chinarly (Azerbaijani: Çinarlı; Vəng) or Vank (Armenian: Վանք) is a village in the Khojavend District of Azerbaijan, in the disputed region of Nagorno-Karabakh. The village is located close to the town of Hadrut. The village had an ethnic Armenian-majority population prior to the 2020 Nagorno-Karabakh war, and also had an Armenian majority in 1989.

== Toponymy ==
The village was known as Vank (Armenian: Վանք; Russian: Ванк; Azerbaijani: Vəng) during the Soviet period. The Azerbaijani government renamed the village to Çinarlı in October 2020, during the 2020 Nagorno-Karabakh war.

== History ==
During the Soviet period, the village was part of the Hadrut District of the Nagorno-Karabakh Autonomous Oblast. After the First Nagorno-Karabakh War, the village was administrated as part of the Hadrut Province of the breakaway Republic of Artsakh. The village came under the control of Azerbaijan on 20 October 2020, during the 2020 Nagorno-Karabakh war.

== Historical heritage sites ==
Historical heritage sites in and around the village include the 14th-century church of Spitak Khach (Armenian: Սպիտակ խաչ, lit. 'White Cross') located on a hill to the north of the village, on the road towards Hadrut.

== Demographics ==
The village had 133 inhabitants in 2005, and 122 inhabitants in 2015.
