= Skhtorashen =

Skhtorashen / Shykh Dursun Սխտորաշեն / Şıx Dursun
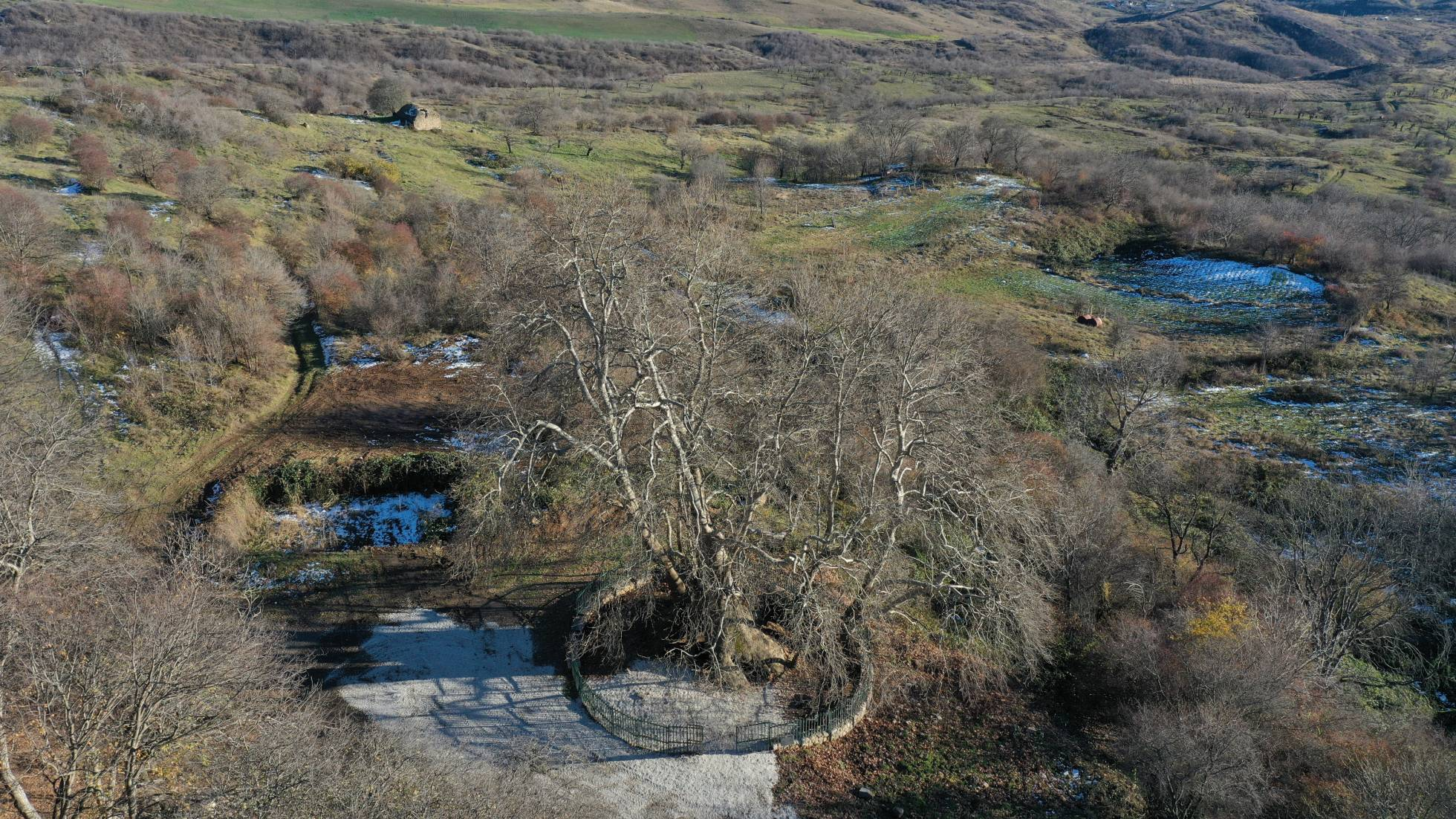
- A sign towards Tnjri, a 2000-year old plane-tree near Skhtorashen

- Location within Azerbaijan
- Coordinates: 39°42′13″N 46°56′26″E
- Country: Azerbaijan
  - District: Khojavend

Population (2005)
  - Total: 19
- Time zone: UTC+4 (AZT)

Skhtorashen (Armenian: Սխտորաշեն, also Şıxtoraşen, Skhtorasher, and Suktorashen) or Shykh Dursun (Azerbaijani: Şıx Dursun) is a village located in the Khojavend District of Azerbaijan, in the region of Nagorno-Karabakh. Until 2023, it was controlled by the breakaway Republic of Artsakh. The village had an ethnic Armenian-majority population until the expulsion of the Armenian population of Nagorno-Karabakh by Azerbaijan following the 2023 Azerbaijani offensive in Nagorno-Karabakh.

Near the village is a 2,042 years old (as of 2022) giant Oriental plane tree (Platanus orientalis) named Tnjri, with a circumference of 27 m and height of 54 m.

== History ==
During the Soviet period, the village was a part of the Martuni District of the Nagorno-Karabakh Autonomous Oblast.

== Historical heritage sites ==
Historical heritage sites in and around the village include Tnjri, a 2,000-year-old Oriental Plane, the 12th/13th-century village of Mavas (Armenian: Մավաս), the village of Hin Skhtorashen (Armenian: Հին Սխտորաշեն, lit. 'Old Skhtorashen') from between the 15th and 19th centuries, the 17th-century monastic complex of Yerek Mankuk (Armenian: Երեք մանկուք) in Mavas, and the church of Surb Astvatsatsin (Armenian: Սուրբ Աստվածածին, lit. 'Holy Mother of God') built in 1731.

== Economy and culture ==
The population is mainly engaged in agriculture and animal husbandry. The village is part of the community of Karmir Shuka.

== Demographics ==
The village has an ethnic Armenian-majority population, and had 19 inhabitants in 2005.

== Gallery ==
Tnjri, a 2000-year old plane-tree near Skhtorashen

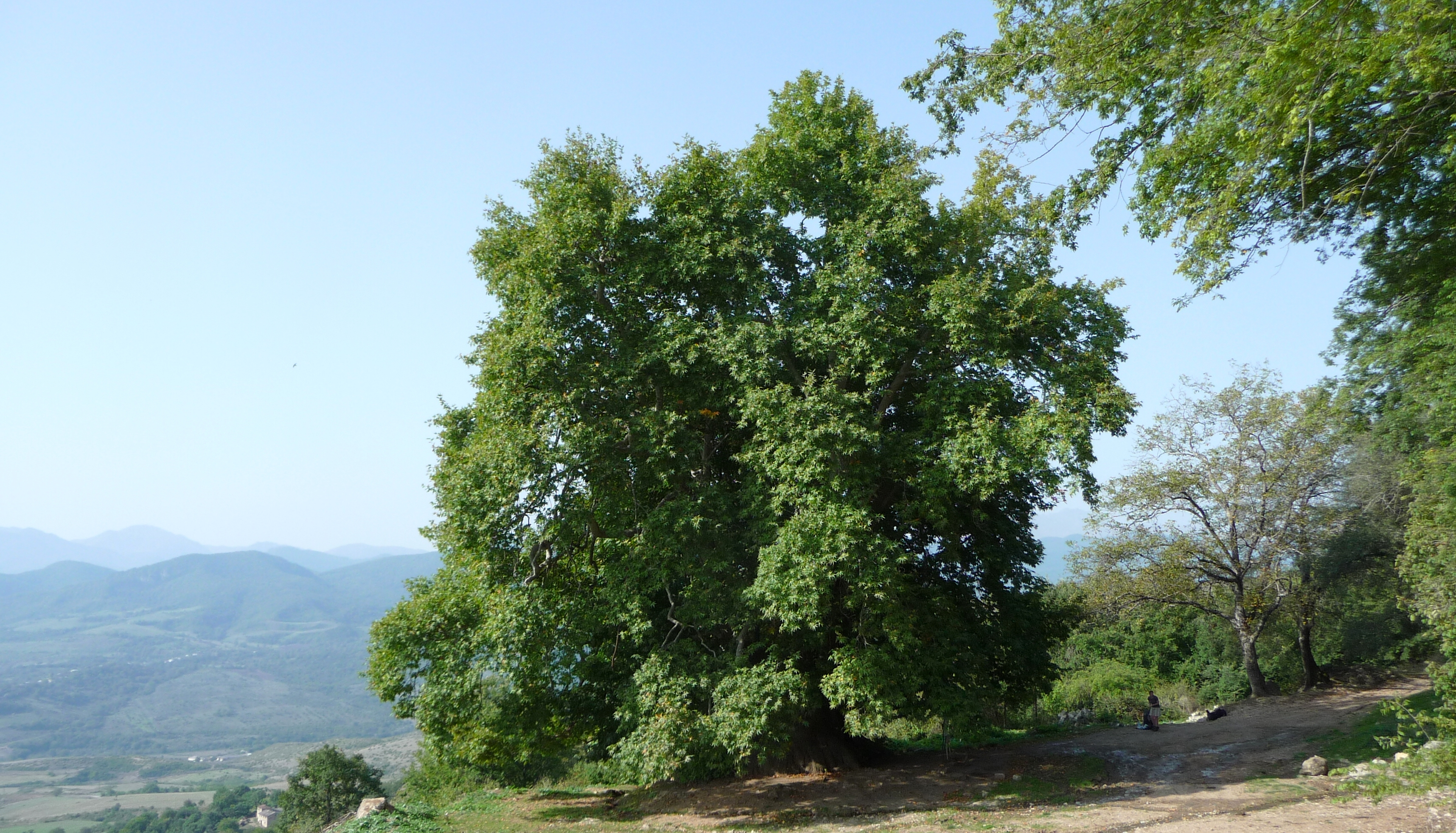

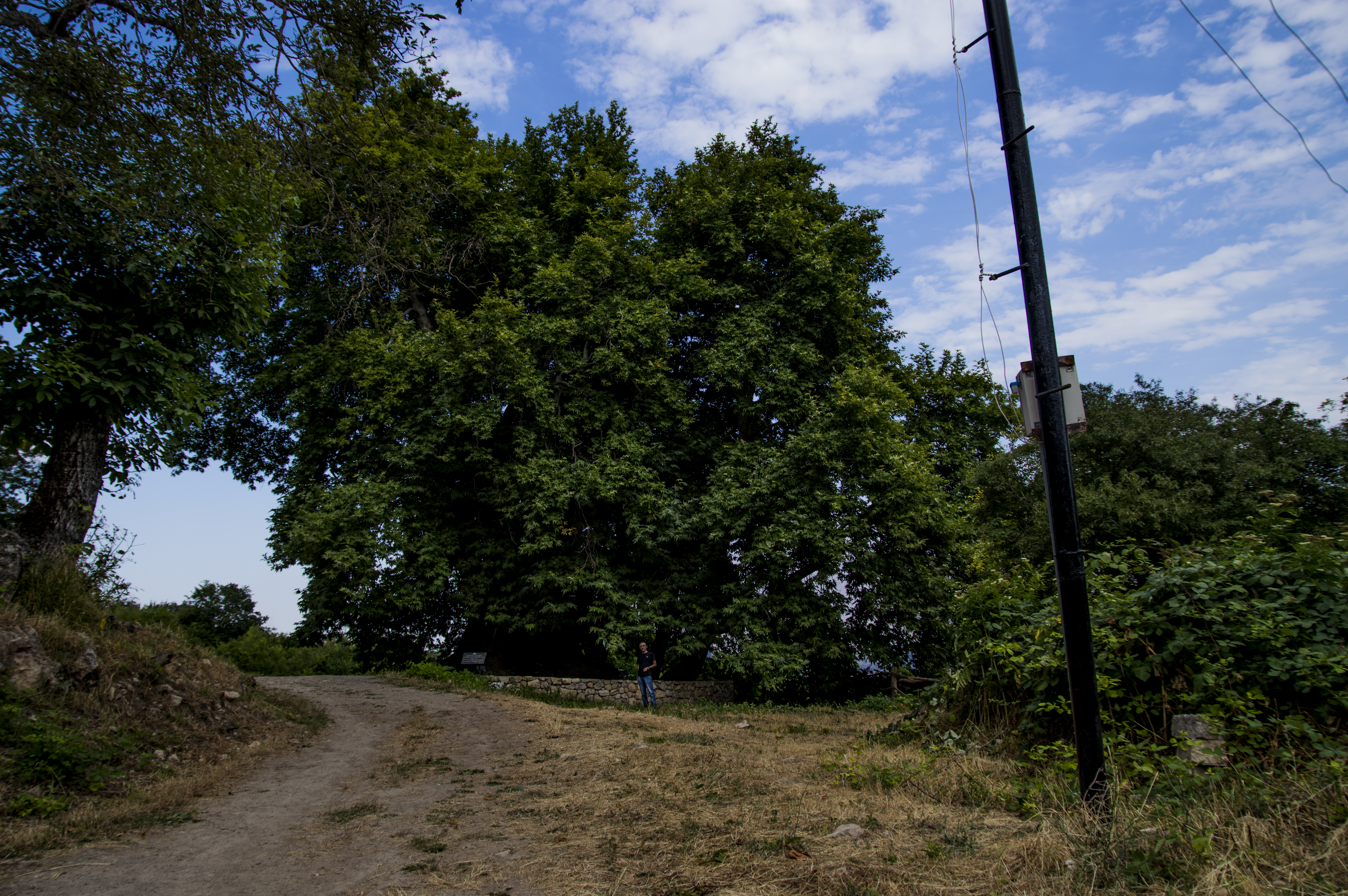

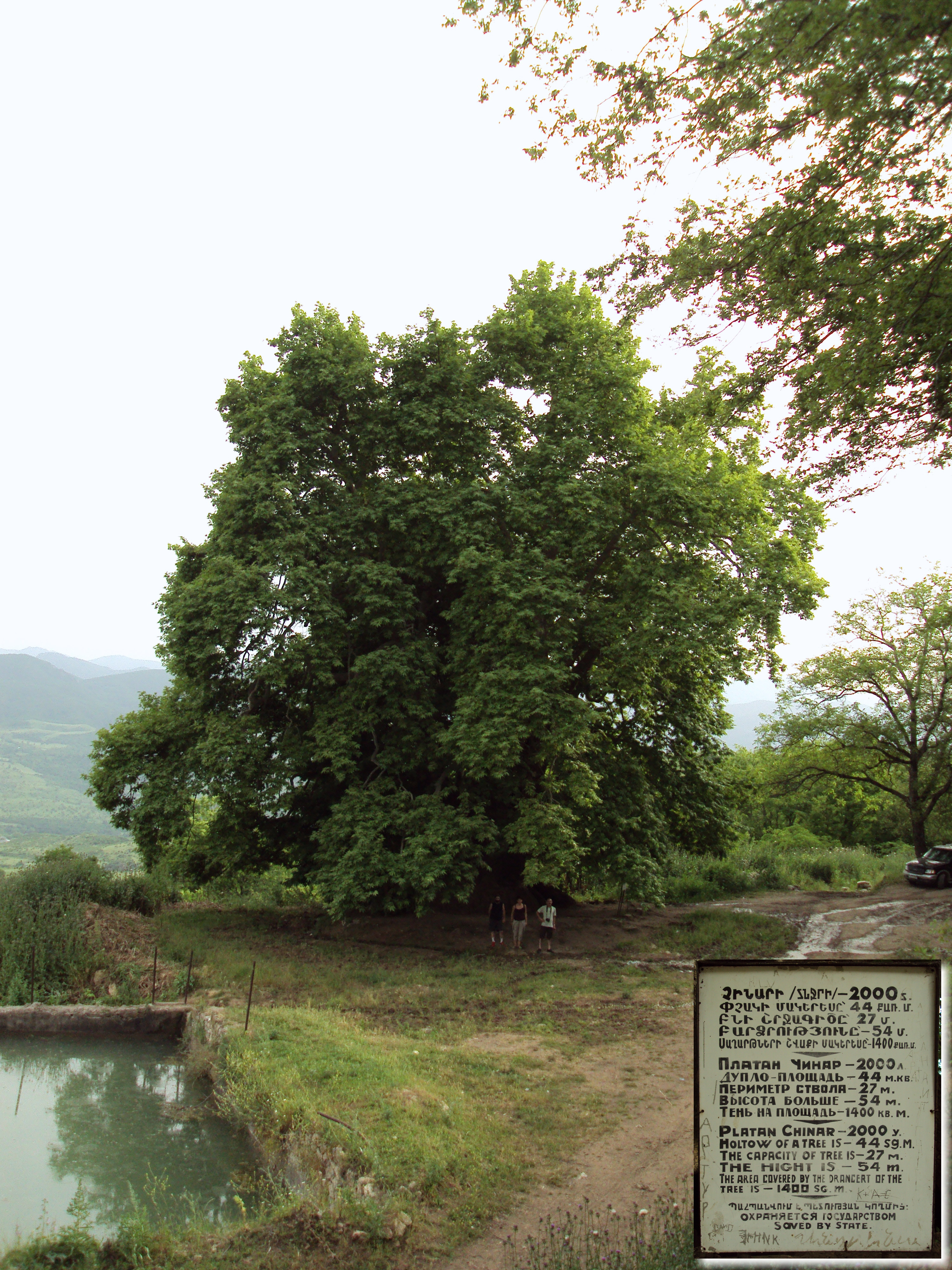

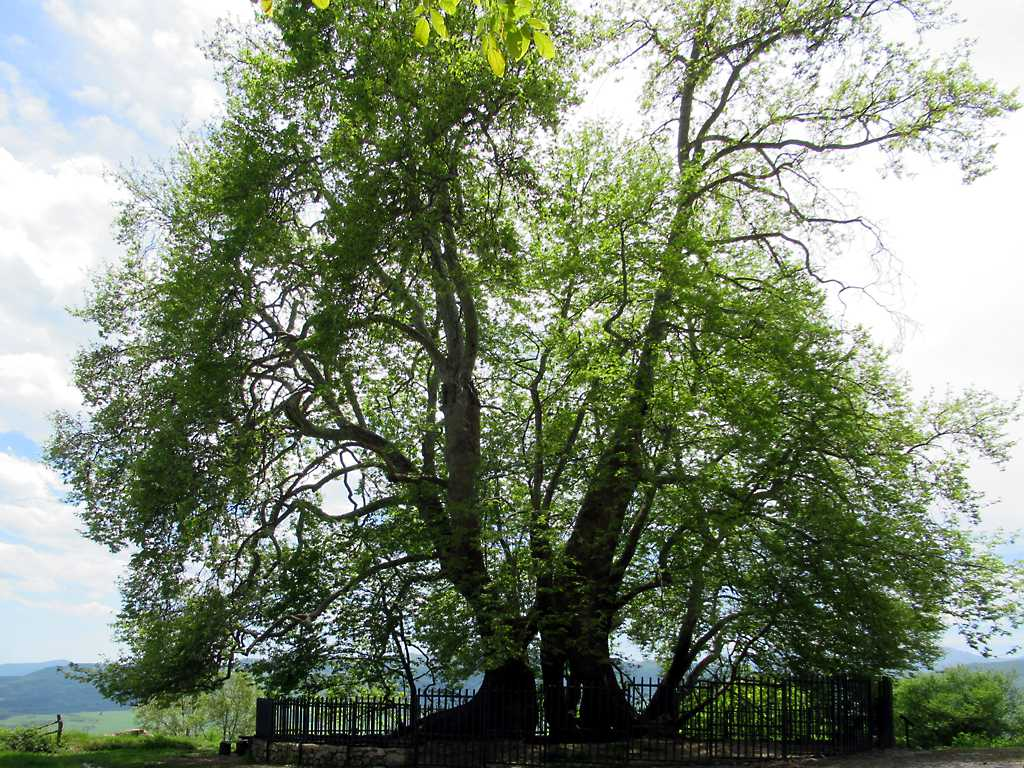

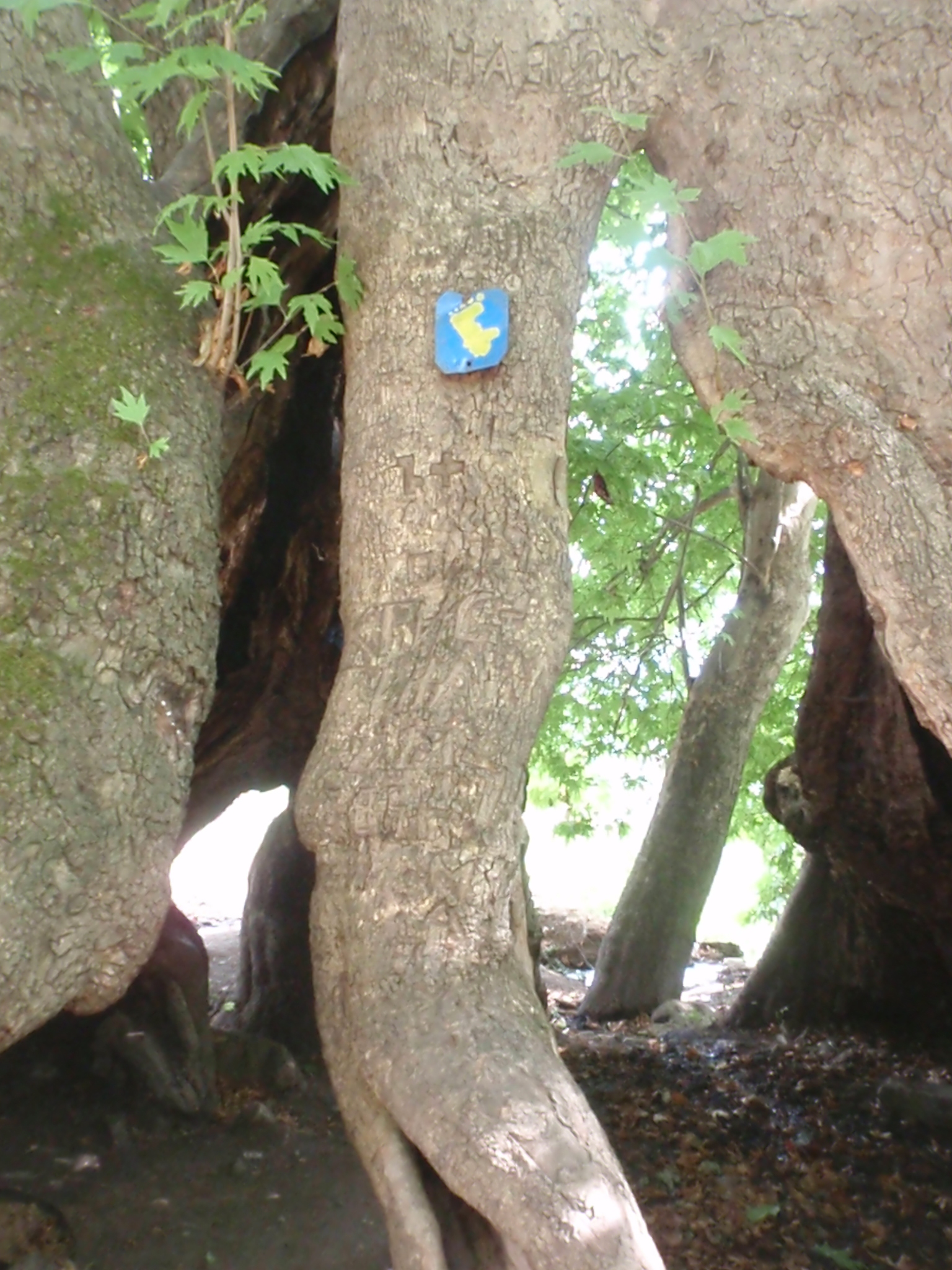
