= Hadrut =

Hadrut Հադրութ
- Town
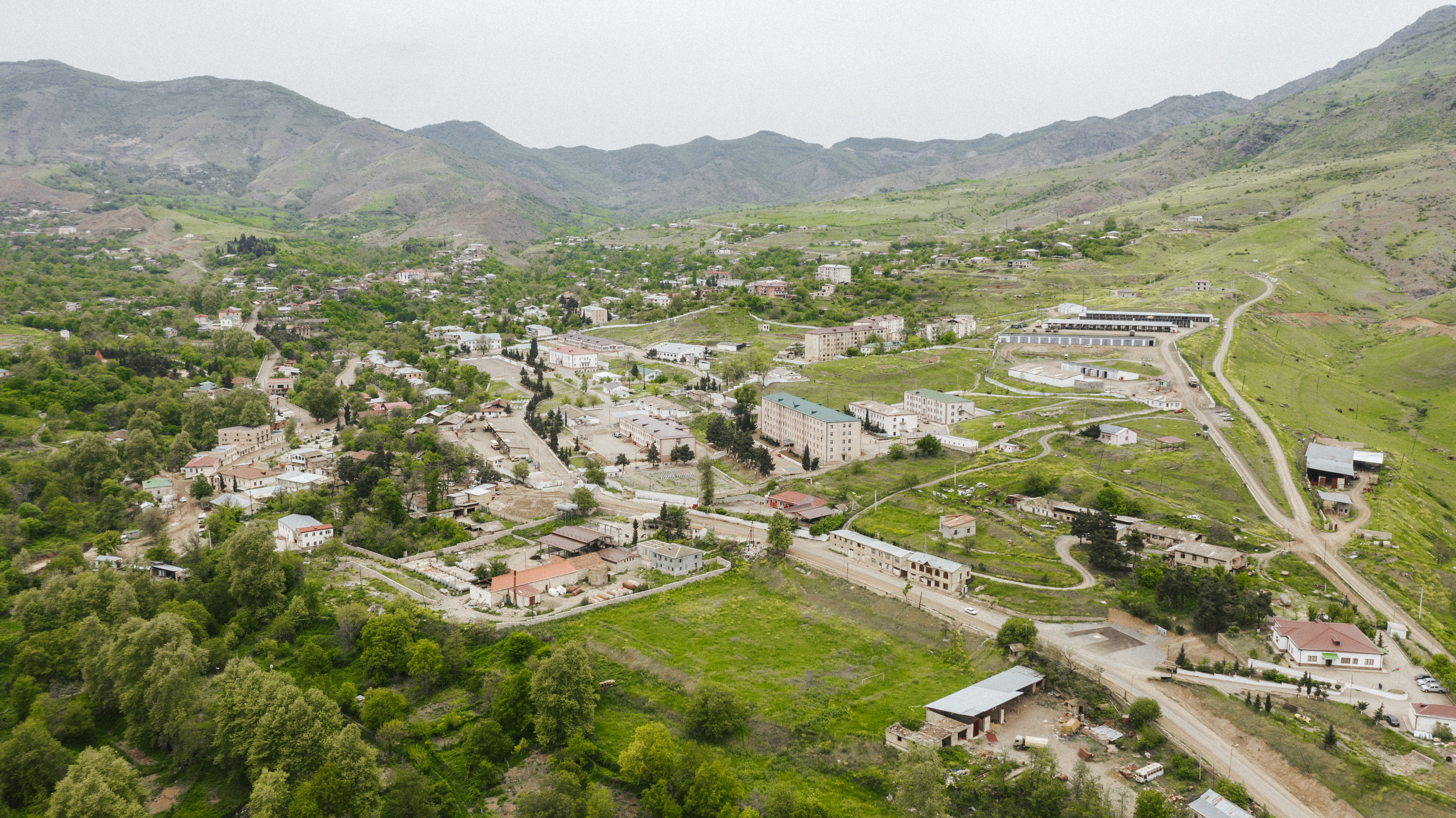
- View of Hadrut in 2021

- Location within Azerbaijan
- Coordinates: 39°31′00″N 47°01′48″E
- Country: Azerbaijan
- District: Khojavend
- Elevation: 720 m (2,360 ft)

Population (2015)
  - Total: 4,100
- Time zone: UTC+4 (UTC)

Hadrut (Armenian: Հադրութ) is a town in the region of Nagorno-Karabakh, Azerbaijan. Until 2020 it was controlled by the breakaway Republic of Artsakh. The town had an ethnic Armenian-majority population, prior to the 2020 Nagorno-Karabakh war.

Numerous Armenian civilians were killed in and around Hadrut by Azerbaijani forces during or after the battle. Subsequently, Azerbaijani soldiers vandalized Armenian-owned property, including the local church and cemetery, obliterating its gravestones.

== Toponymy ==
The name Hadrut is of Persian origin and means "between two rivers". This is explained by the fact that the older part of the settlement was located between two streams, Guney-chay and Guzey-chay. Hadrut later expanded beyond the two rivers to the east and west.

The town is also infrequently called Getahat (Գետահատ) by Armenians. In Azerbaijan, the town is also called Aghoghlan (Ağoğlan).

== History ==
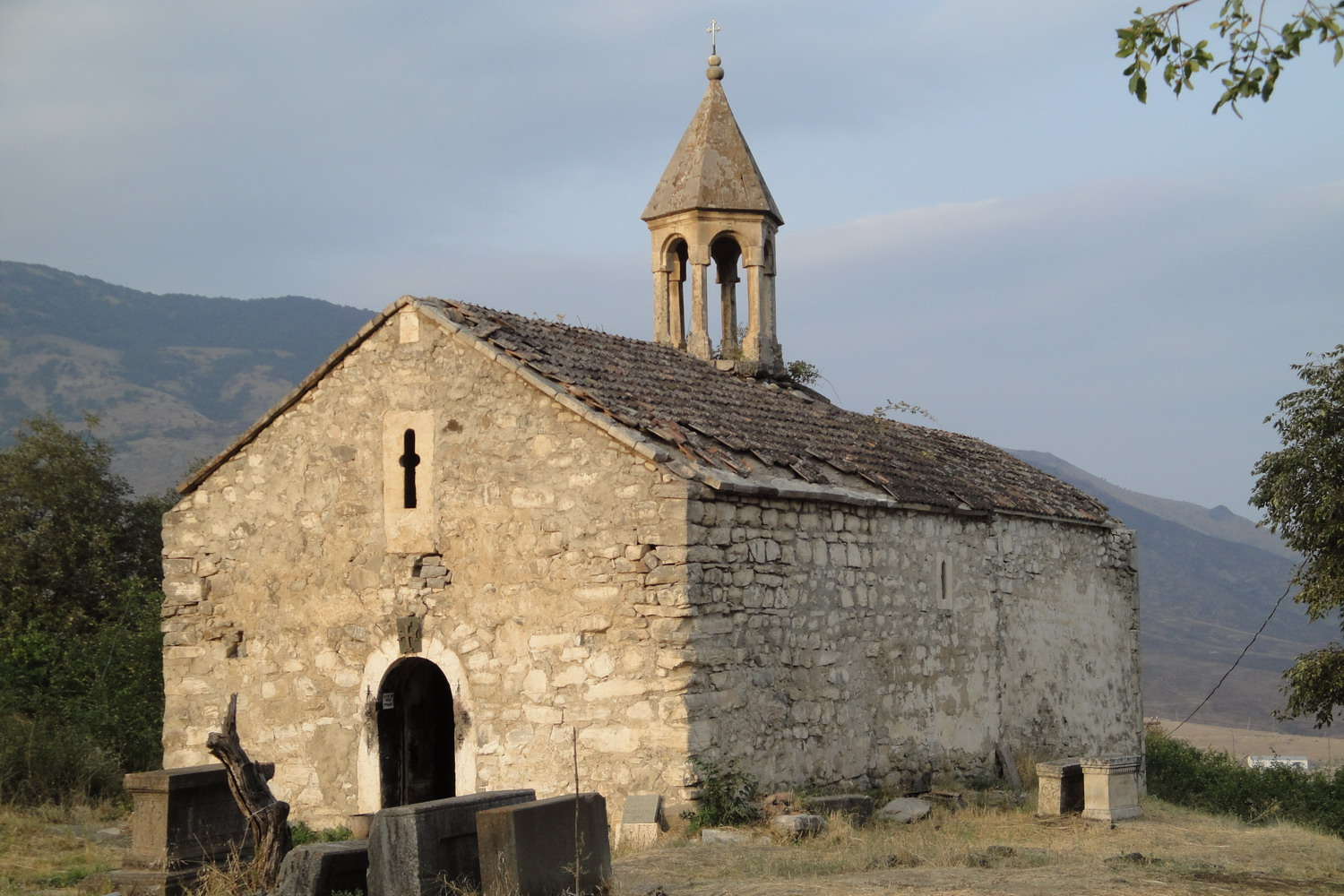
The 14th-century White Cross Church (Spitak Khach’) on the road between Hadrut and Vank.

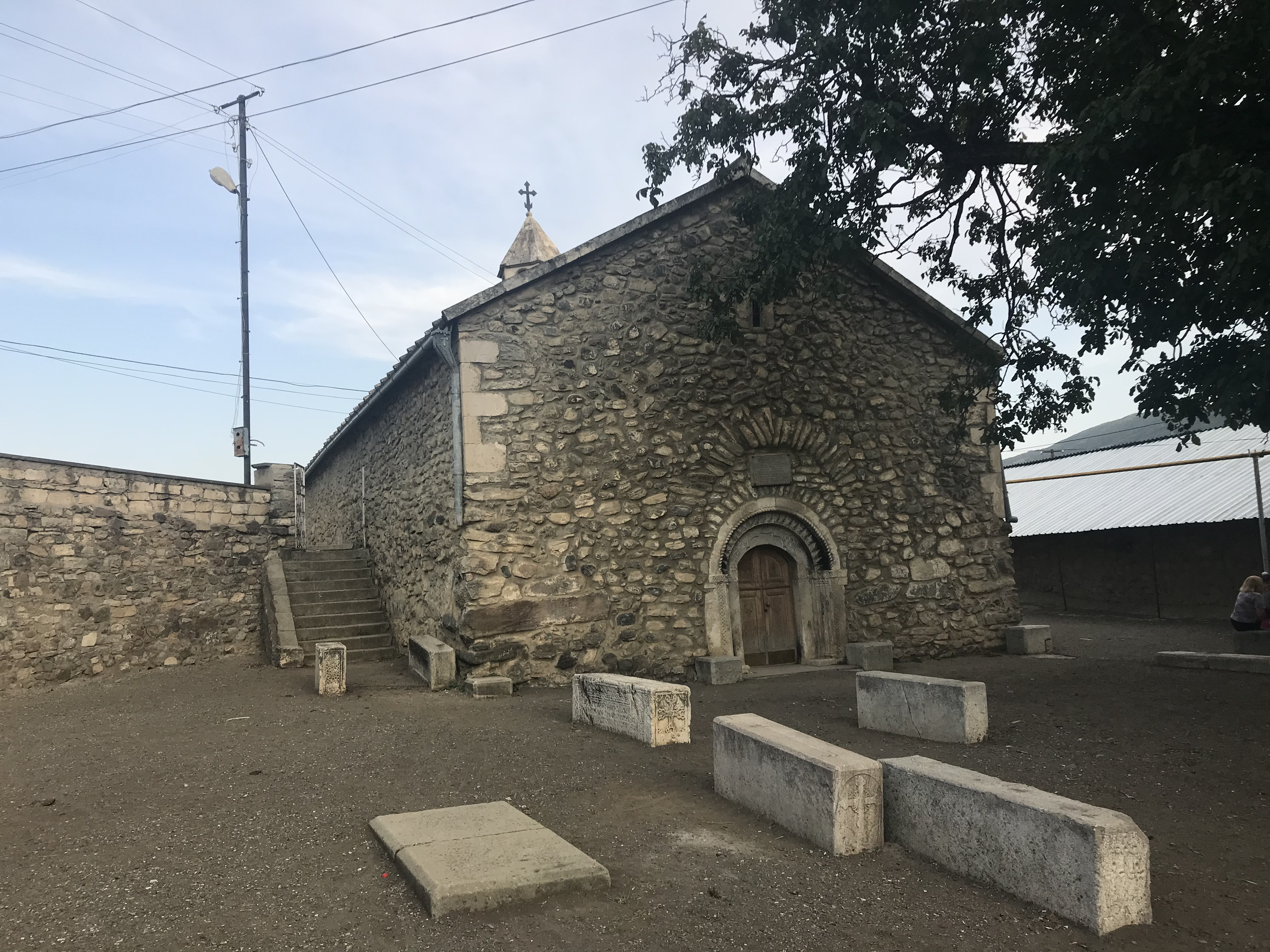
The Holy Resurrection Church (Surb Harut’yun Yekeghets’i) of Hadrut, built in 1621.

The date of Hadrut's foundation is unknown. Fragments of monuments and historical artifacts dated to pre-Christian, early Christian and medieval times have been found in and around Hadrut. There are several ruins of ancient fortresses and walls in the valley surrounding Hadrut. From medieval times until the early 19th century, Hadrut was a part of the Armenian Principality of Dizak, one of the five Melikdoms of Karabakh. In the 15th and 16th century, many of the fortifications, churches and settlements around Hadrut were destroyed by Ottoman and Safavid forces as they fought for control of the South Caucasus. A small number of these structures were rebuilt under the rule of the meliks of Dizak. The Melikdom of Dizak was subordinated to the Karabakh Khanate before the Russian conquest of Karabakh.

During the Russian period, Hadrut was governed as part of different administrative divisions: first as a part of Karabakh Province (1822–1840), then in the Shusha uezd of the Caspian Oblast (1840–1846), then in the Shusha uezd of the Shemakha Governorate (1846–1859), then of the Shusha uezd of the Baku Governorate (1859–1868), and finally, of the Shusha uezd of the Elizavetpol Governorate (1868–1873) and later the Jebrail uezd of the Elizavetpol Governorate (1873–1917) successively.

In the Soviet period, Hadrut became the centre of the Hadrut District of the Nagorno-Karabakh Autonomous Oblast within Azerbaijan SSR and was given the urban settlement status in 1963. Some of the earliest activities of the Karabakh movement occurred in Hadrut, beginning with the collection of petitions in 1986 for the transfer of the Nagorno-Karabakh Autonomous Oblast to the Armenian SSR and culminating in a demonstration of one thousand people in Hadrut in February 1988, which then spread to the capital of the NKAO, Stepanakert. Following the Armenian victory in the First Nagorno-Karabakh War, Hadrut became the administrative center of the Hadrut Province of the Republic of Artsakh.

In the midst of the 2020 Nagorno-Karabakh conflict, heavy fighting took place in Hadrut, marked by the usage of cluster munitions by the Azerbaijani Army. Azerbaijan captured Hadrut on or around 9 October 2020. Although most of the civilian population was evacuated, Armenian authorities reported that a number of civilians were killed by Azerbaijani forces in Hadrut and the surrounding area during or after the battle. Following the battle, a video of an execution of two unarmed and bound Armenian men in the town by Azerbaijani soldiers spread online, prompting investigations.

The town was vandalized and looted by Azerbaijani soldiers after its capture, with people's belongings strewn throughout the streets and the contents of homes upturned. The Armenian cemetery of the town's church was vandalized as well, with its gravestones having been kicked down and smashed. In January 2021, as part of the reconstruction work in Hadrut, new Azerbaijani-language street signs were erected in Hadrut with new street names based on the names of fallen Azerbaijani soldiers and historical Azerbaijani personalities. In June 2021, Azerbaijani authorities installed an "Iron Fist" monument in the town to celebrate the outcome of the 2020 war. Construction of a mosque started in October 2021, and the finished mosque was officially inaugurated on 14 September 2025.

In November 2022 Azerbaijani Government has completed the development of general plans for Hadrut. The master plan for Hadrut was drawn up by SP Architects. Construction of a new residential quarter in the southern part of the town was started in May 2023. In August 2025 Azerbaijani Reconstruction, Construction, and Management Service, strategically positioned within the Aghdam, Fuzuli, and Khojavend districts, has commenced preliminary operations for the enhancement and refurbishment of multi-unit residential structures will be executed within the Hadrut locality. The aggregate expenditure for the initiatives is anticipated to be 4.6 million manat ($2.7 million). Post-war resettlement of the town was started in September 2025, when 10 Azerbaijani families (41 people) settled there.

== Historical heritage sites ==
Historical heritage sites in and around the town include the 14th-century church of Spitak Khach’ ('White Cross') located on a hill to the south of Hadrut, on the road towards the neighboring village of Vank, the 13th-century bridge of Tsiltakhach’, the Holy Resurrection Church (Surb Harut’yun Yekeghets’i) built in 1621, a cemetery from between the 17th and 19th centuries, as well as a 19th-century bridge, watermill and oil mill.

== Notable people ==
Sar Sargsyan, Armenian baritone singer

== Economy ==
The town was home to the Mika-Hadrut Winery, which produced brandy, vodka, and wine.

== Demographics ==
According to the 1910 publication of Kavkazskiy kalendar, Hadrut—then known as Gadrud in Russian—had a mostly Armenian population of 2,700 in 1908.

The earliest recorded census of the town of Hadrut showed a population of around 2,400 registered inhabitants in 1939, of which more than 90% was Armenian. Hadrut kept an Armenian-majority population throughout the First Nagorno-Karabakh War, up until the 2020 Nagorno-Karabakh war, during which the town was captured by Azerbaijani forces and the Armenian population was expelled.

Year	Armenians		Azerbaijanis		Russians		Ukrainians		Total
Year	Number	%	Number	%	Number	%	Number	%	Total
1939	2,200	91.4	51	2.1	129	5.4	22	0.9	2,408
1970	1,845	88.6	137	6.6	68	3.3	18	0.9	2,082
1979	1,955	90.0	188	8.7	19	0.9	2	0.1	2,173
2005	2,936	100.0	0	0.0	0	0.0	0	0.0	2,936
2015	3,102	100.0	0	0.0	0	0.0	0	0.0	3,102
October 2020: Seizure by Azerbaijani forces. Exodus of Armenian population

As of December 2025, 33 Azerbaijani families, totaling 130 individuals, have been resettled in Hadrut by Azerbaijan.

== Gallery ==
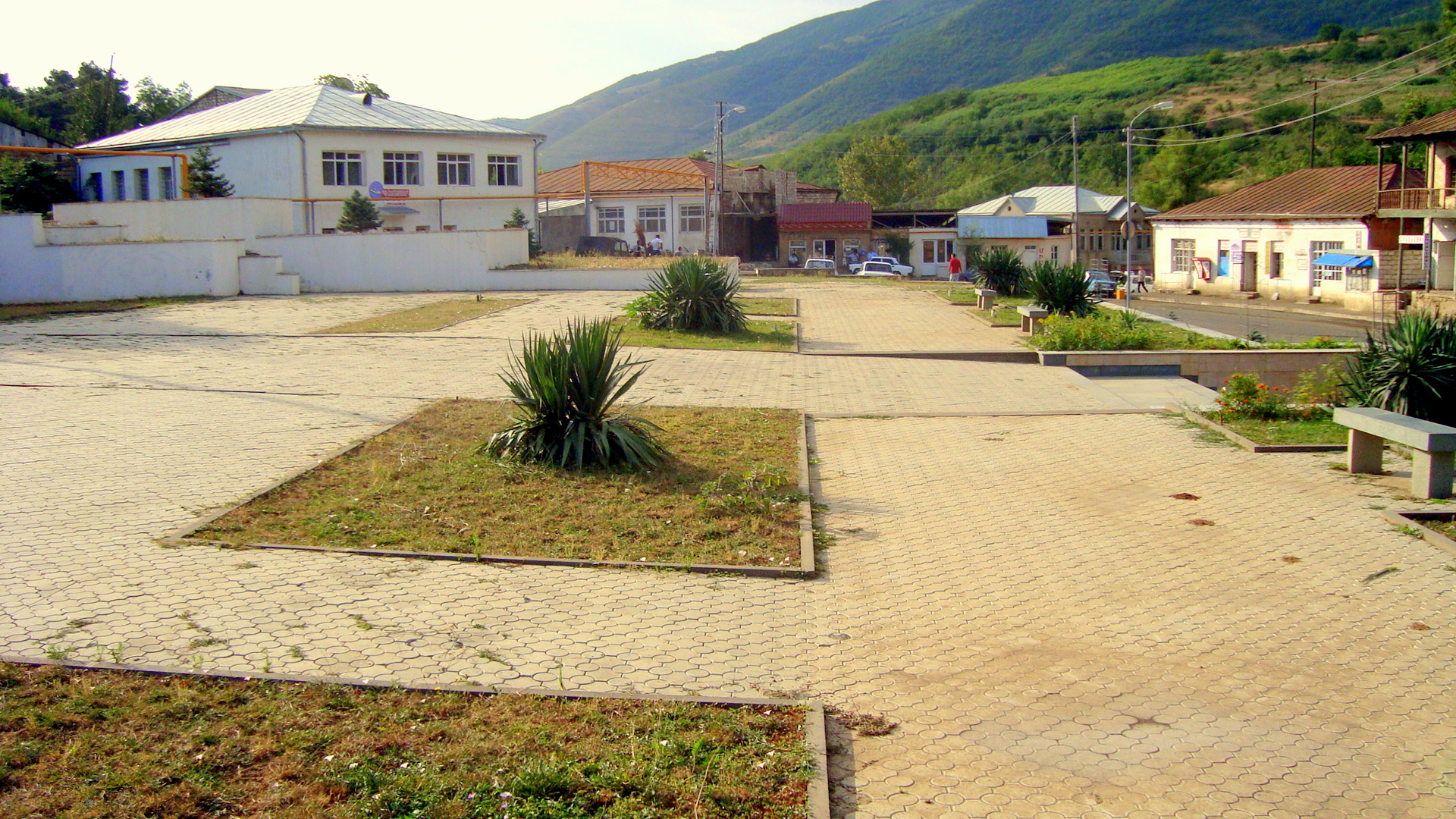
The center of Hadrut

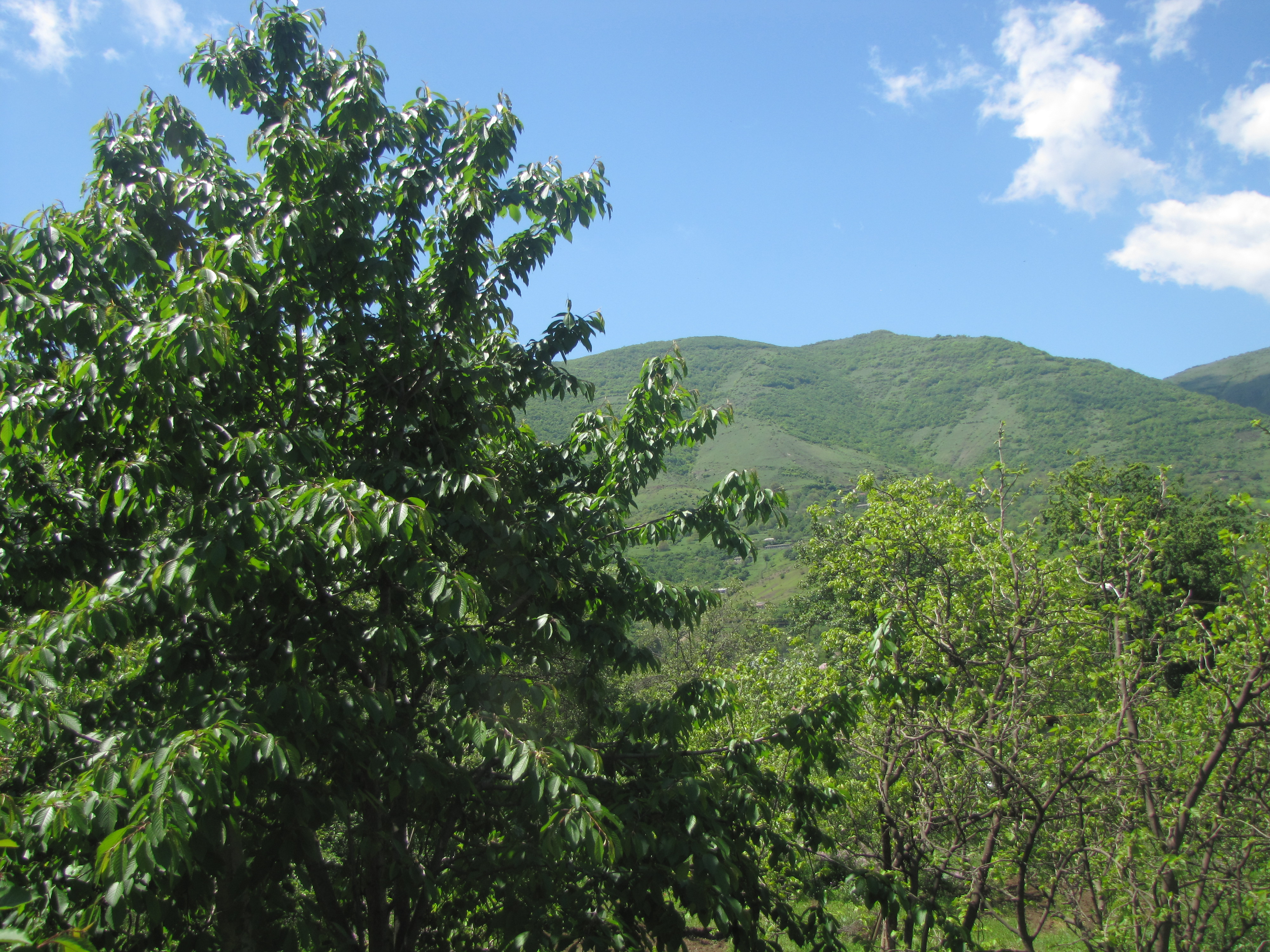
Scenery

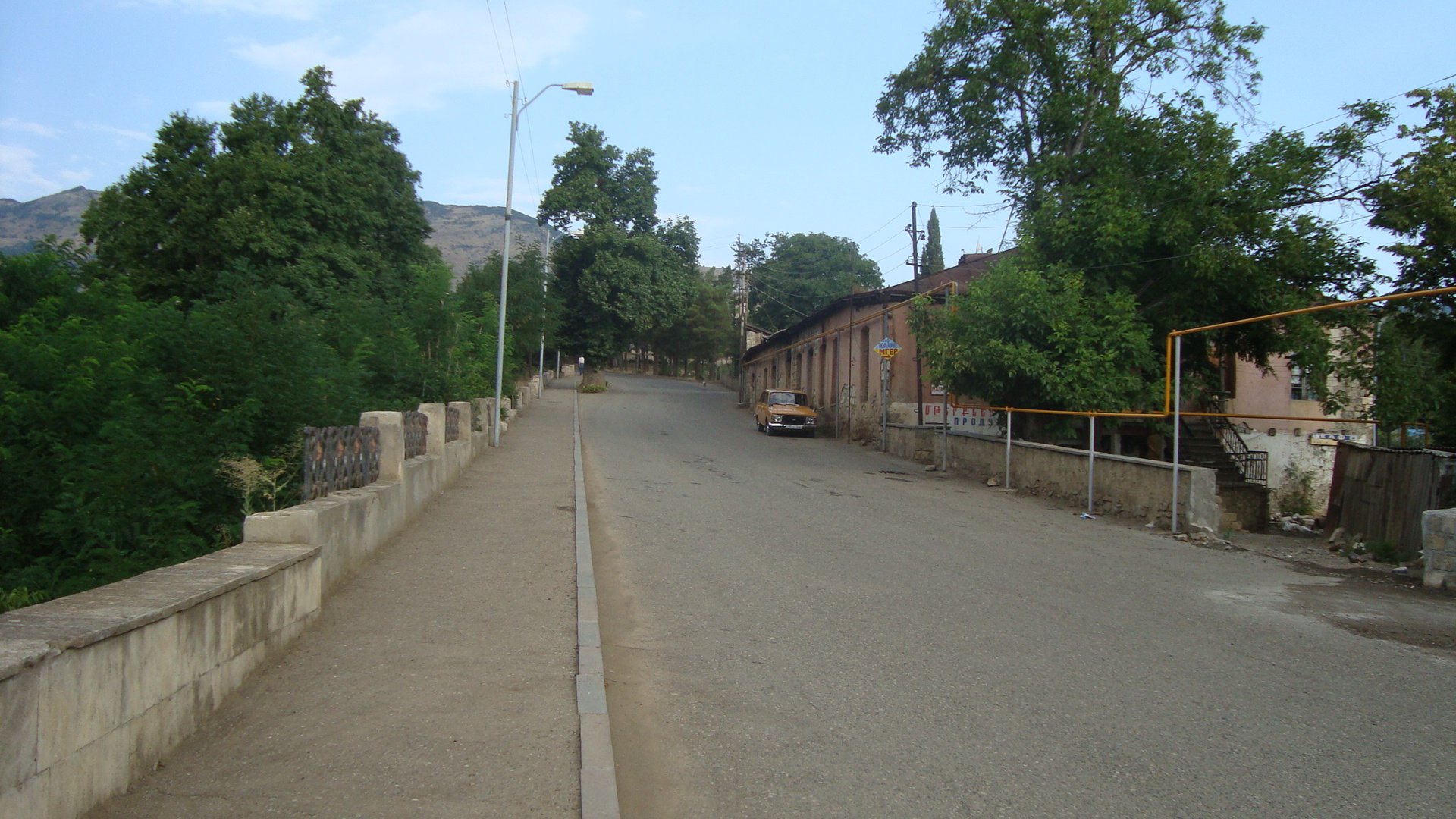
View of Hadrut streets

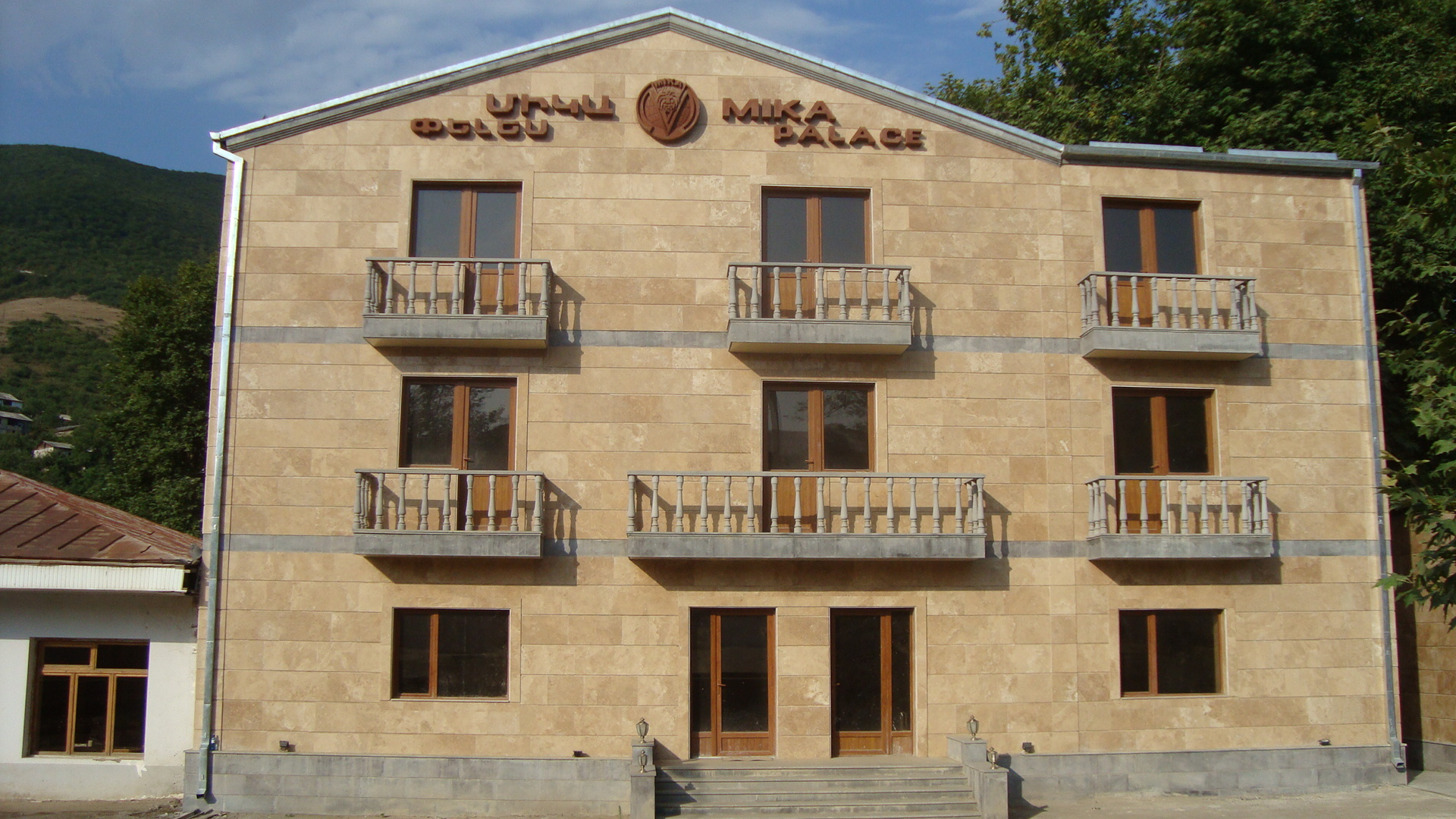
A hotel in Hadrut

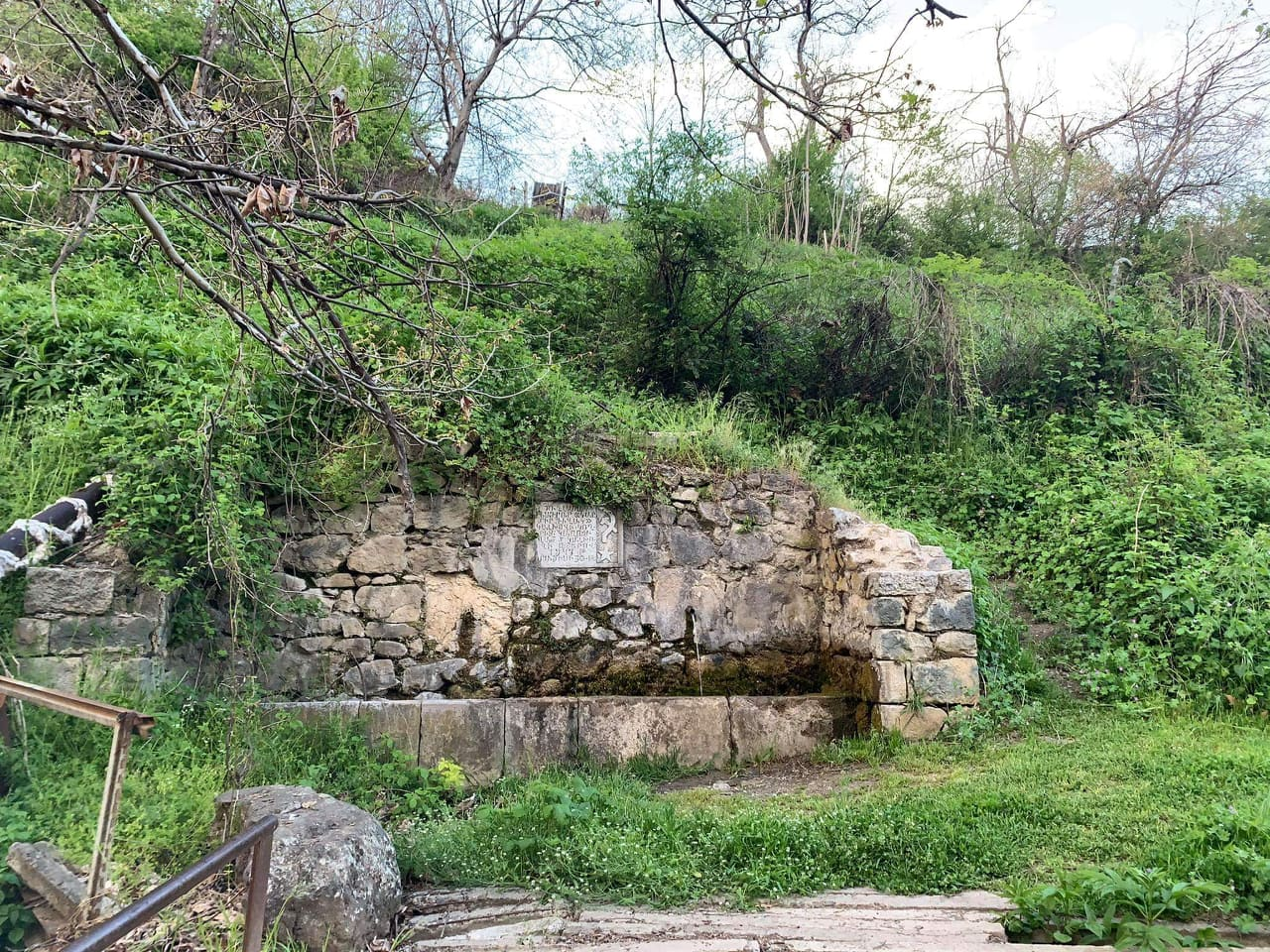
Spring in Hadrut

Hadrut regional hospital

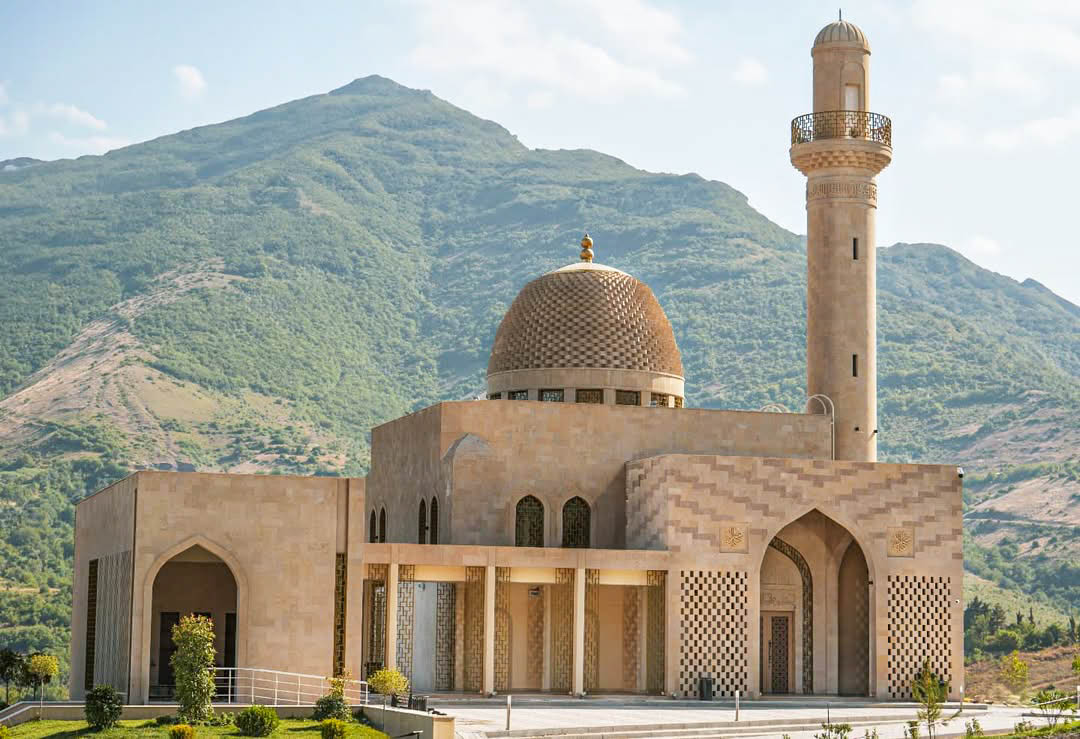
Hadrut mosque (2025)

== Climate ==
Hadrut has a Temperate climate with hot summers(Cfa) according to the Köppen climate classification.

Climate data for Hadrut
Month	Jan	Feb	Mar	Apr	May	Jun	Jul	Aug	Sep	Oct	Nov	Dec	Year
Mean daily maximum °C (°F)	4.5 (40.1)	5.4 (41.7)	9.2 (48.6)	16.4 (61.5)	20.2 (68.4)	25.2 (77.4)	28.3 (82.9)	29.2 (84.6)	23.7 (74.7)	18.3 (64.9)	11.6 (52.9)	7.1 (44.8)	16.6 (61.9)
Mean daily minimum °C (°F)	−2.9 (26.8)	−2.3 (27.9)	0.8 (33.4)	6.5 (43.7)	10.8 (51.4)	14.9 (58.8)	18.0 (64.4)	16.9 (62.4)	13.9 (57.0)	8.8 (47.8)	3.7 (38.7)	−0.4 (31.3)	7.4 (45.3)
Average precipitation mm (inches)	22 (0.9)	28 (1.1)	42 (1.7)	54 (2.1)	79 (3.1)	59 (2.3)	25 (1.0)	24 (0.9)	31 (1.2)	44 (1.7)	34 (1.3)	23 (0.9)	465 (18.2)
Source: http://en.climate-data.org/location/52897/

== International relations ==
When the town was under Armenian control, Hadrut was twinned with the following cities:

- Vagarshapat, Armenia (2010–2020)
- Burbank, United States (2014–2020)
