= Karadzhaly =

- Location within Azerbaijan
- Coordinates: 40°23′00″N 48°08′15″E
- Country: Azerbaijan
- Rayon: Kurdamir
- Time zone: UTC+4 (AZT)
  - Summer (DST): UTC+5 (AZT)

Karadzhaly (also, Kagadzhy and Kagadzhyly) is a village in the Kurdamir Rayon of Azerbaijan.
