= Gorazıllı =

- Location within Azerbaijan Location within Karabakh Economic Region
- Coordinates: 39°31′33″N 47°15′57″E
- Country: Azerbaijan
- District: Fuzuli

Population
  - Total: 0
- Time zone: UTC+4 (AZT)

Gorazıllı is a village in the Fuzuli District of Azerbaijan.
