= Qışlaq, Jabrayil =

Qışlaq
- Location within Azerbaijan
- Coordinates: 39°28′19″N 47°02′29″E
- Country: Azerbaijan
- District: Jabrayil
- Time zone: UTC+4 (AZT)
  - Summer (DST): UTC+5 (AZT)

Qışlaq (also, Gyshlag and Gishlag) is a village in the Jabrayil District of Azerbaijan.
