= Tnjri =

2,042 years old tree

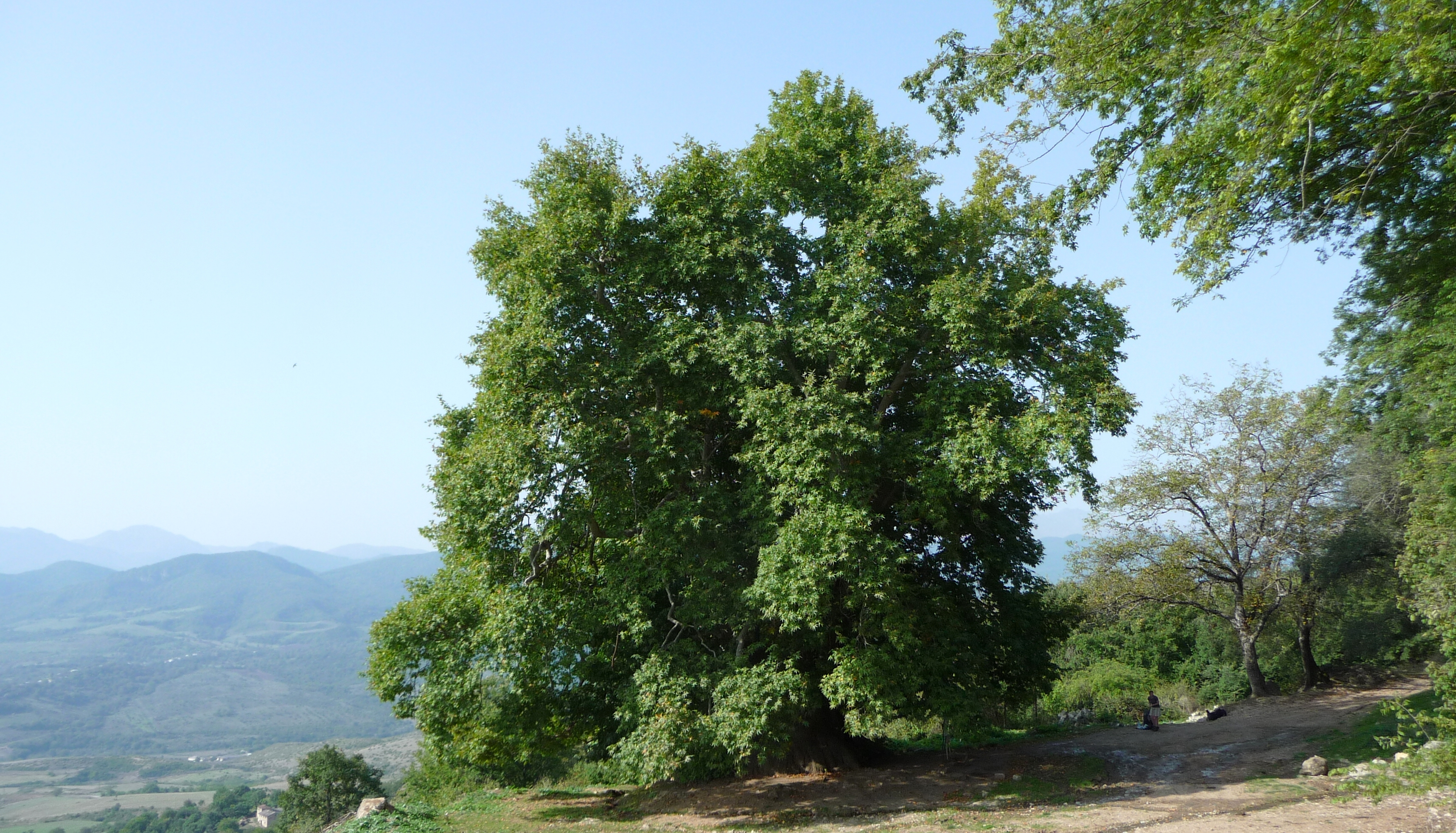
- Tnjri in summer

- Location within Azerbaijan
- Native name: Տնջրի
- Species: Oriental plane
- Location: Skhtorashen, Khojavend District, Azerbaijan
- Coordinates: 39.69684006256945°N 46.94850748596971°E

Tnjri (Armenian: Տնջրի [tənd͡ʒəˈɾi], from տնջրի tnǰri, which in the Karabakh dialect means ‘plane tree’) is a 2045–2046-year-old giant Oriental plane tree.

It is located on the eastern slope of the gorge in Main Caucasian Mountain Range nearby the village of Skhtorashen, Azerbaijan.

The tree is situated near the Tengru spring, which is the main source of irrigation for the tree.

At least two centuries ago, lightning struck this tree and the tree was badly damaged. The hollow of the tree is 44 m^{2} (470 sq ft), where more than 40 people can stand. The area covered by the foliage of the tree is 1,400 m^{2} (15,000 sq ft). The circumference of the tree is 27 m (89 ft) and the height is more than 54 m (177 ft) which can be compared with an 18-story building.

The tree has been visited by many famous people - such as the inventor of the Armenian alphabet Mesrop Mashtots (5th century AD), the first Armenian historian Movses Khorenatsi (5th century AD), and musician and poet Sayat-Nova (18th century). Every year thousands of pilgrims and tourists who visit Artsakh also come to visit the Tnjri chinar (platanus in Armenian) tree. Tnjri serves as a local shrine.

== Gallery ==
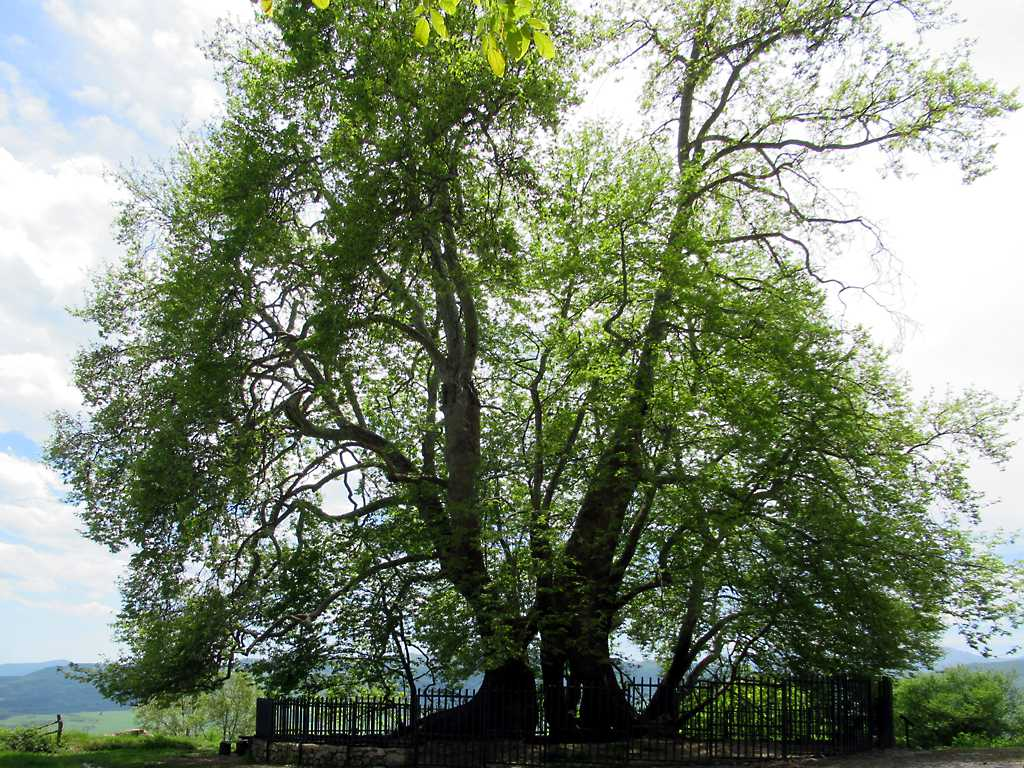
Tnjri in spring

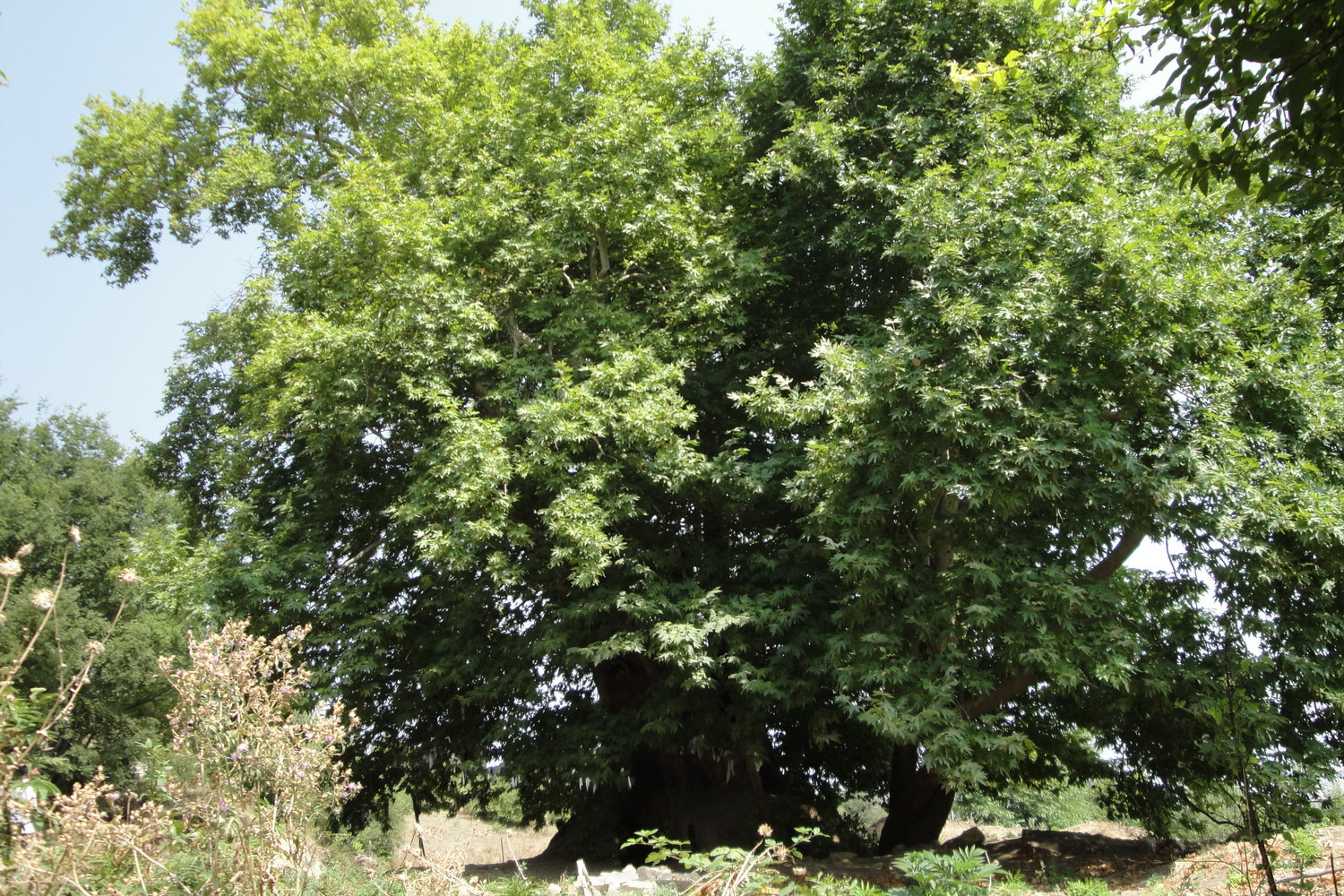
Tnjri in summer

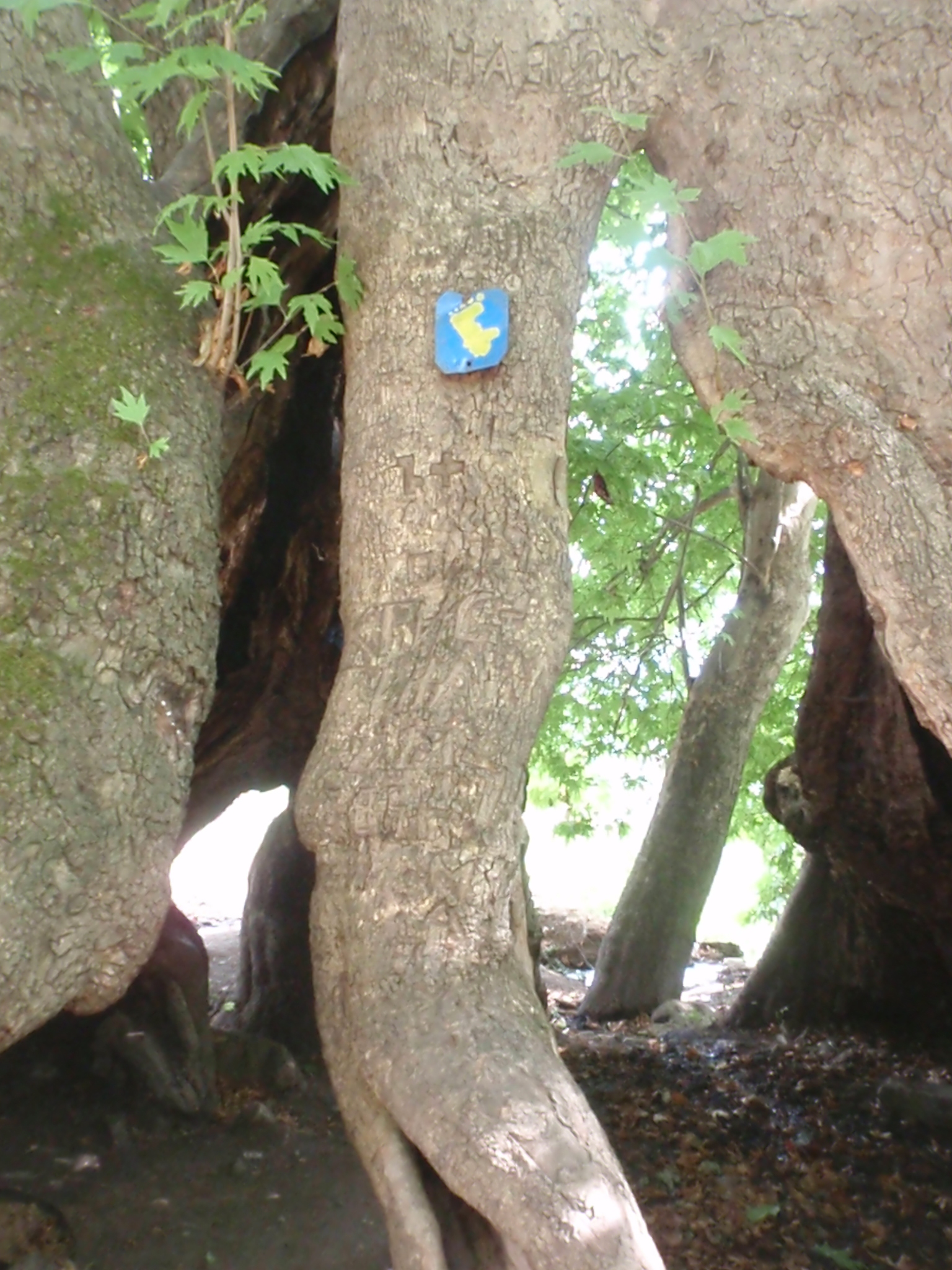
The hollow

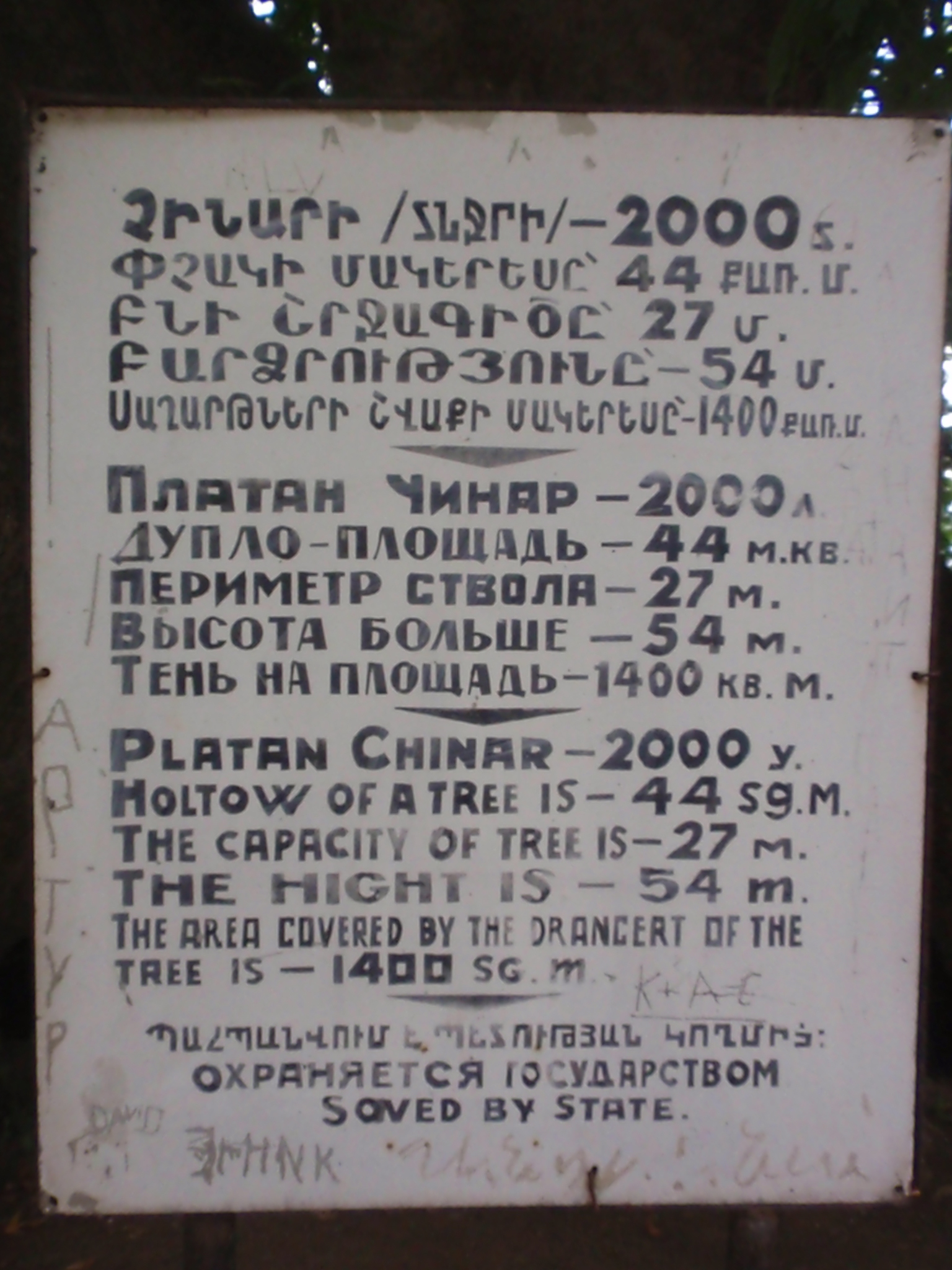
Information sign
