= Əfəndilər, Qubadli =

Əfəndilər
- Location within Azerbaijan Location within East Zangezur Economic Region
- Coordinates: 39°19′50.8″N 46°41′57.2″E
- Country: Azerbaijan
- District: Qubadli

Population (2015)
  - Total: 94
- Time zone: UTC+4 (AZT)

Əfəndilər (Afandilar) is a village in the Qubadli District of Azerbaijan.

== History ==
The village was located in the Armenian-occupied territories surrounding Nagorno-Karabakh, coming under the control of ethnic Armenian forces during the First Nagorno-Karabakh War in August 1993. The village subsequently became part of the breakaway Republic of Artsakh as part of its Kashatagh Province, referred to as Aygek (Armenian: Այգեկ). It was recaptured by Azerbaijan on 25 October 2020 during the 2020 Nagorno-Karabakh war.

== Historical heritage sites ==
Historical heritage sites in and around the village include a mosque from the early 20th century.

== Demographics ==
The village had 104 inhabitants in 2005, and 94 inhabitants in 2015.
