= Yuxarı Güzlək =

- Location within Azerbaijan Location within Karabakh Economic Region
- Coordinates: 39°29′53.6″N 47°05′05.1″E
- Country: Azerbaijan
- District: Fuzuli
- Time zone: UTC+4 (AZT)
  - Summer (DST): UTC+5 (AZT)

Yuxarı Güzlək (also, Yuxarı Küzlək) is a village in the Fuzuli District of Azerbaijan.
