= Qaracallı, Jabrayil =

Qaracallı
- Location within Azerbaijan
- Coordinates: 39°28′15″N 47°05′08″E
- Country: Azerbaijan
- Rayon: Jabrayil
- Time zone: UTC+4 (AZT)
  - Summer (DST): UTC+5 (AZT)

Qaracallı (also, Karadzhally, Karadzhanly, and Karajali) is a village in the Jabrayil Rayon of Azerbaijan.
