= Süleymanlı, Azerbaijan =

Süleymanlı
- Location within Azerbaijan
- Coordinates: 39°27′50″N 47°03′51″E
- Country: Azerbaijan
- Rayon: Jabrayil
- Time zone: UTC+4 (AZT)
  - Summer (DST): UTC+5 (AZT)

Süleymanlı (also, Suleymanly) is a village in the Jabrayil Rayon of Azerbaijan.
