= Əfəndilər, Jabrayil =

Əfəndilər
- Location within Azerbaijan
- Coordinates: 39°26′04″N 47°02′50″E
- Country: Azerbaijan
- Rayon: Jabrayil
- Time zone: UTC+4 (AZT)
  - Summer (DST): UTC+5 (AZT)

Əfəndilər (also, Efendilyar) is a village in the Jabrayil Rayon of Azerbaijan.
