= Timeline of the Second Nagorno-Karabakh War =

This is an account of engagements which occurred during the Second Nagorno-Karabakh War, primarily based on announcements from the belligerents. The war has been characterized by the use of armoured warfare; drone warfare, especially the use of Turkish-made Bayraktar TB2 and Israeli loitering munition Harop drones; heavy artillery; rocket attacks; and trench warfare. It has also featured the deployment of cluster munitions, which are banned by the majority of the international community but not by Armenia or Azerbaijan: Azerbaijan states that Armenia has deployed cluster munitions against civilians, and international third parties have confirmed evidence of Azerbaijan's use of cluster munitions against civilian areas of Nagorno-Karabakh. A series of ballistic missile attacks have inflicted mass civilian casualties in Ganja, Azerbaijan, while civilian residences and infrastructure in Stepanakert, and elsewhere have been targeted, inflicting casualties and causing extensive damage.

The conflict is also marked by extensive social media campaigning - some of which is alleged to be "inauthentic" - and widespread misinformation, exacerbated by the low number of journalists that have access to the frontline. This phenomenon has been characterized as an information war concurrent to the physical battles on the ground. Facebook has claimed to have removed a number of Facebook and Instagram accounts and pages that were involved in "co-ordinated inauthentic behavior".

The amount of territory contested is relatively restricted, but the war has expanded beyond the borders of Nagorno-Karabakh due to the level of conflict and kind of munitions deployed and spilled over international borders. Shells and rockets have landed in East Azerbaijan Province in Iran, although causing no damage, and Iran has reported several unmanned aerial vehicles (UAVs) downed or crashed within its territory, while Georgia stated that two UAVs had crashed in Kakheti Province.

After the shelling of Khojavend, Artsakh authorities began mobilizing civilians. Just before 04:00 (00:00 GMT) on 10 October, Russia reported that both Armenia and Azerbaijan had agreed on a humanitarian ceasefire after ten hours of talks in Moscow (the Moscow Statement) and announced that both would enter "substantive" talks. Fighting continued: a second ceasefire attempt midnight 17 October was also ignored, followed by a third ceasefire attempt failing on 26 October.

A ceasefire agreement was signed by the governments of Azerbaijan, Armenia and Russia on 9 November 2020, bringing the conflict to a close.

== September ==
=== 27 September ===
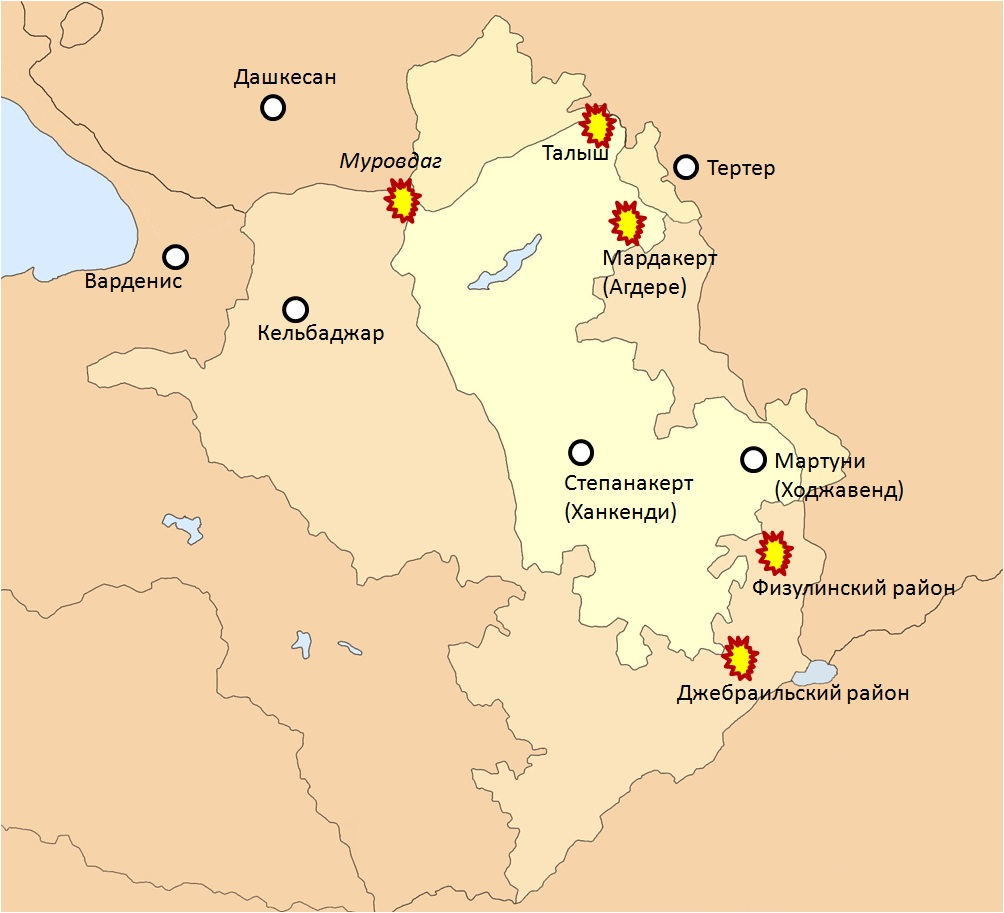
Military engagements and attacks on 27–28 September.

According to Artsakh authorities, hostilities commenced when at 08:03 Azerbaijani armed forces launched artillery and aerial strikes against civilian settlements, including the capital, Stepanakert. The Armenian Ministry of Defence (MoD) stated that the Azerbaijani offensive, aimed at Stepanakert, began at 08:10 local time (04:10 GMT). Azerbaijani authorities stated that at about 06:00 local time, Armenian armed forces started intensive shelling of Azerbaijani army positions along the entire front and of nearby Azerbaijani settlements. Azerbaijan thus stated that it launched a counteroffensive. In the offensive, Azerbaijan stated it deployed manpower, tank and rocket artillery units, aircraft and UAVs. The Republic of Artsakh introduced martial law and total mobilization of its male population, while the Azerbaijani President addressed the nation.

In the afternoon, Azerbaijan announced martial law and a curfew. The Azerbaijani military deployed tanks, artillery, missile systems and aircraft near the front and entered deeper into Nagorno-Karabakh. According to the Armenian MoD, in the morning Azerbaijani armed forces also attacked in the direction of Vardenis in Armenia proper. The Azerbaijani MoD stated it had taken seven villages in Nagorno-Karabakh. At 16:29, Azerbaijan issued a surrender ultimatum to the Armenian command in the zone, while affirming its compliance with international humanitarian law and the Geneva Conventions. In the afternoon, the Azerbaijani MoD stated it had taken a mountain peak in the Murovdag range. The Ministry also stated that its forces had taken effective control of the Vardenis–Martakert/Aghdara highway connecting Nagorno-Karabakh and Armenia.

=== 28 September ===
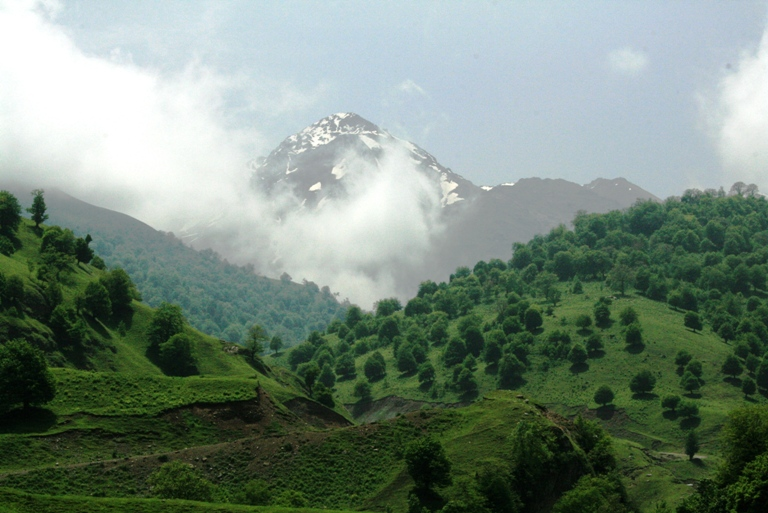
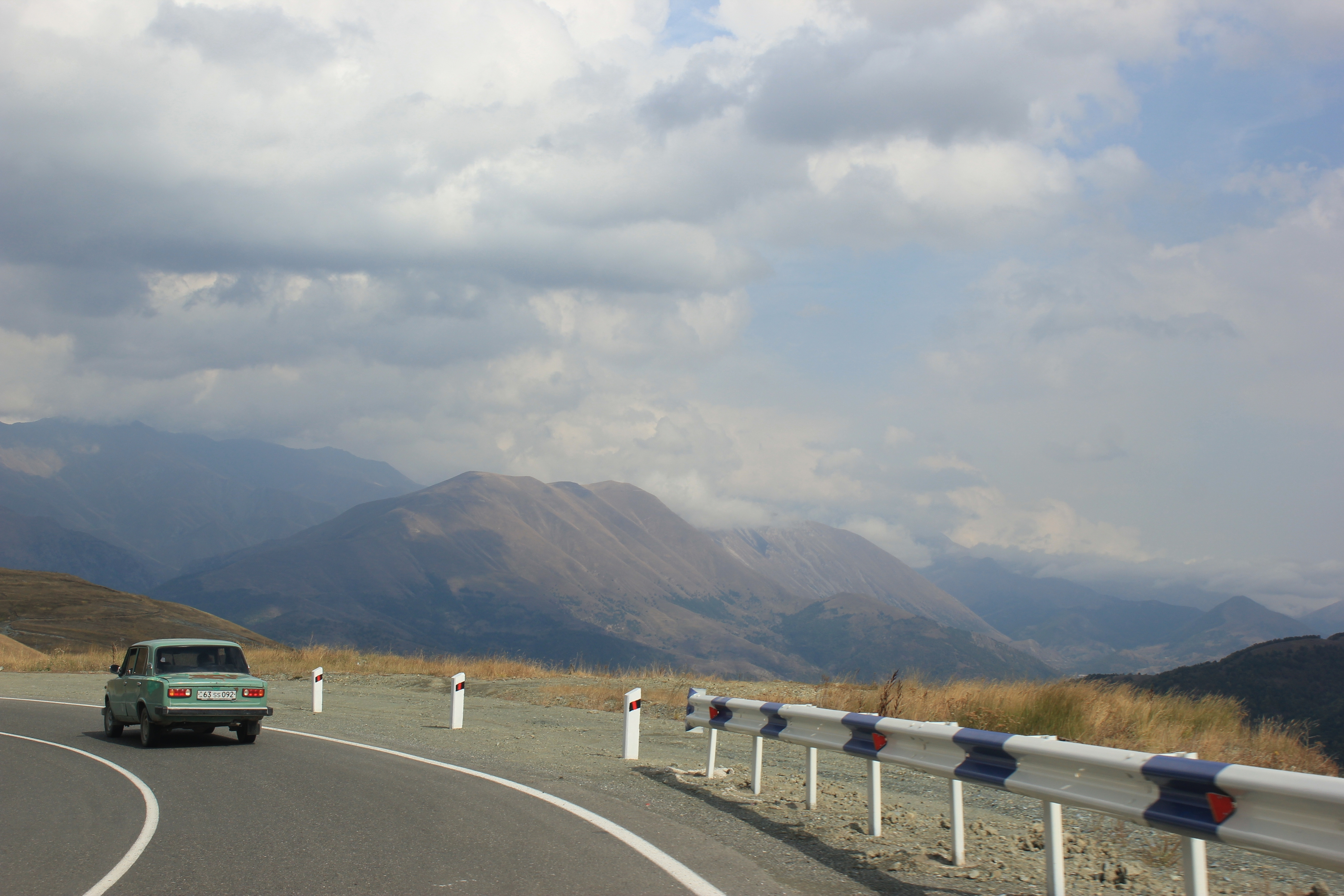
Murovdag peak (above) and Vardenis–Martakert/Aghdara M11 highway (below), which came under Azerbaijani control according to the country's defence ministry.

At around 08:00, the Azerbaijani MoD stated that Armenian forces had fired upon Tartar in the early morning and issued a warning in response, while the Azerbaijani Ministry of Foreign Affairs (MoFA) stated that Armenian forces had purposefully targeted civilian sites and civilians. The President of Artsakh stated that during the morning's clashes, Armenian forces had regained control over a number of previously ceded positions. At approximately 10:00, the Azerbaijani MoD said that Azerbaijani forces had gained strategic high ground around Talış while Armenian forces had incurred heavy losses. The President of Artsakh stated that Azerbaijani forces were facing Armenian attacks on all fronts. Shortly after, the Azerbaijani MoD stated that Azerbaijani forces had fired on Armenian artillery units that had been targeting Azerbaijani-controlled settlements in the area of Aghdara; it added Armenian units had incurred losses from artillery fire and withdrew.

At around 19:00, the Azerbaijani MoD stated that Armenian forces had fired upon Yuxarı Ağcakənd and Qaramusalı in Goranboy District. At approximately 20:00, Artsakh authorities stated that Armenian forces had retaken some positions, adding that Armenian forces had repelled Azerbaijani attacks and advanced into Azerbaijani territory. Subsequently, at approximately 21:00, an Armenian MoD-related source, Artsrun Hovhannisyan, stated that Azerbaijani forces had launched a new major offensive operation in the Aras Valley and in the direction of Madagiz–Talış. Around one hour later, Poghosyan stated that an Azerbaijani airplane had been shot down near Khojavend; Azerbaijan issued a denial. The Azerbaijani MoD denied allegations that Azerbaijan had deployed F-16s, denying it owned any.

=== 29 September ===
At around 08:00, the Azerbaijani MoD stated that intensified clashes had continued along the front overnight; it added it had repelled an Armenian counterattack. Concurrently, Azerbaijani aerial and ground forces allegedly destroyed a mixed column of Armenian military vehicles travelling from Madagiz in the direction of Aghdara, together with an artillery battery. At approximately 09:00, the Ministry stated that from 07:30, Azerbaijan's Dashkasan District had been shelled from Vardenis, in Armenia; the Armenian MoFA issued a denial, saying this was a fabrication to justify expanding the theater of operations, including against Armenia. Azerbaijani authorities reiterated its statements of Armenian aggression. The Azerbaijani MoD then stated that its offensive on Fuzuli City continued from the early morning. Subsequently, it denied Armenian reports of retaking territory.

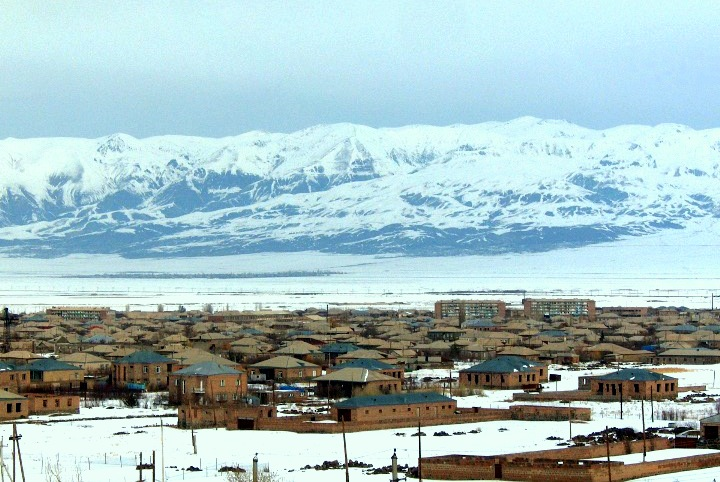
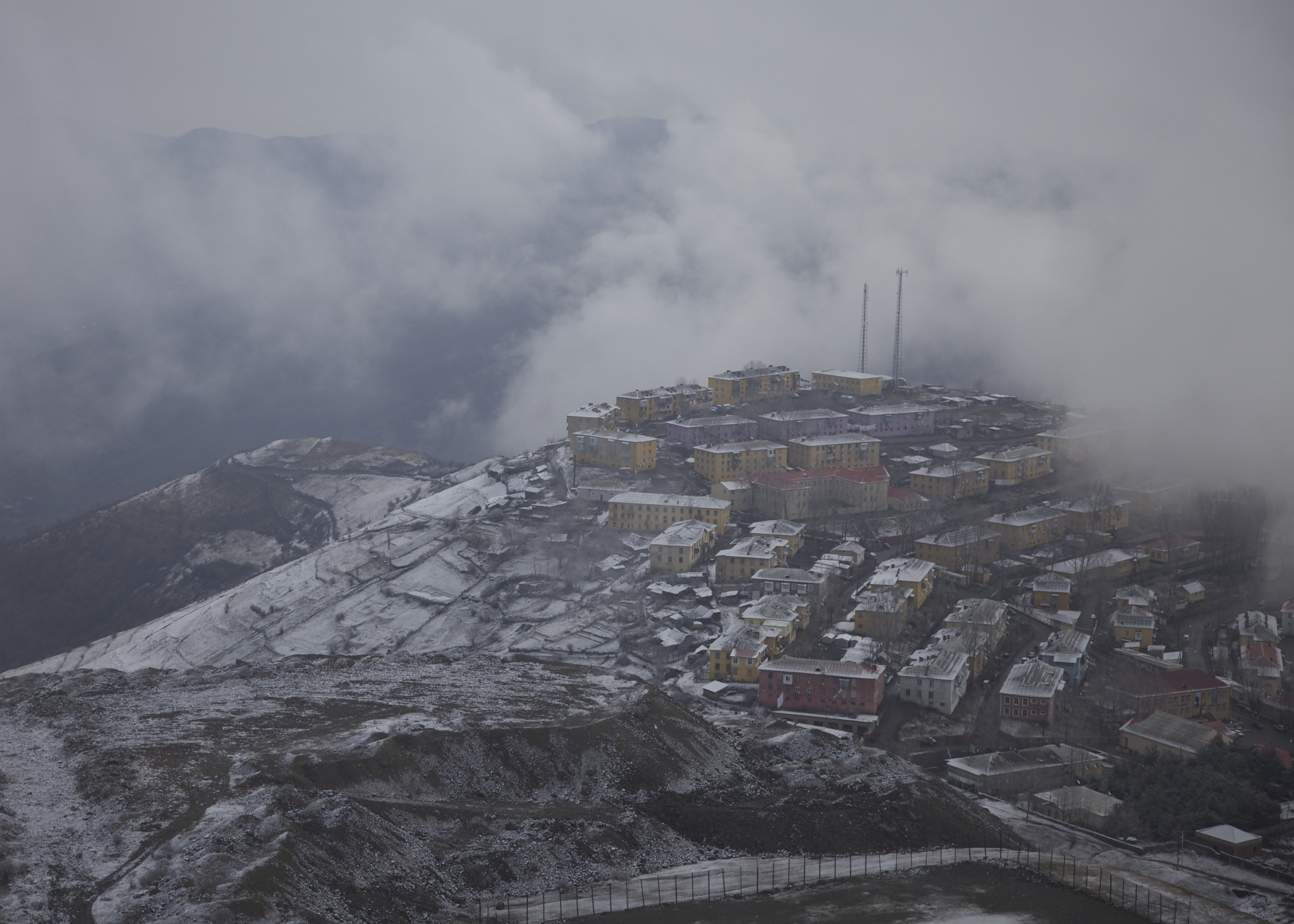
On 29 September, the clashes spilled over to Vardenis (above) and Daşkəsən (below), on the Armenian–Azerbaijani state border.

At around 11:00, the Armenian MoD stated that Azerbaijani forces had fired on the Armenian military base in Vardenis, within Armenia, also deploying its air force. The Azerbaijani MoD said they destroyed an Armenian motorized rifle regiment stationed in Khojavend District; the ADA issued a denial. Azerbaijan stated it had destroyed an Armenian Uragan multiple rocket launcher in Khojavend District. Subsequently, an Armenian source said further Azerbaijani attacks were repelled.

At around 12:00, one Azerbaijani gunship was said to have been downed; the Azerbaijani MoD issued a denial, stating it had not been deploying helicopters. At approximately 12:40, ADA units reported to have downed two helicopters using Igla man-portable surface-to-air missiles; Artsakh released footage apparently showing this. An Armenian source then stated that Azerbaijani forces were bombarding areas near Vardenis. The Azerbaijani MoD stated it had destroyed an Armenian command-and-observation post in Hadrut in Khojavend District, while the Armenian MoD announced it would be deploying heavier weapons and was repelling Azerbaijani offensives.

The Azerbaijani MoD stated that an Armenian attempt to assault Azerbaijani-controlled military positions from Aşağı Veysəlli in Fuzuli District had been repelled, with Armenian losses. At approximately 13:20, the Armenian MoD stated that the Azerbaijani military had launched an offensive. Around two hours later, the Azerbaijani MoD stated that S-300 missile systems defending Yerevan's airspace were being redeployed towards Nagorno-Karabakh and would be targeted. Shortly after, the ADA released footage apparently showing Armenian forces downing an Azerbaijani gunship.

At around 18:00, the Artsakh MoD stated that Azerbaijani forces had attacked along the northern and north-eastern directions of the front, while the ADA had inflicted losses. Shortly after, the Armenian MoD stated that a Turkish F-16, taking off from Ganja International Airport had downed an Armenian Su-25, killing the pilot. Both Azerbaijani and Turkish authorities issued denials; the Armenian MoD released images of a wrecked Su-25. According to Azerbaijan, two Su-25 jets took off on Armenian territory and later crashed into a mountain. At around 22:00, the Armenian MoD stated an Azerbaijani ammunition convoy had been destroyed. Approximately one hour later, the Azerbaijani MoD stated its forces had destroyed an Armenian position near Həsənqaya in Tartar District and another in the direction of Talış.

=== 30 September ===
According to the Armenian MoD, the clashes continued with lesser intensity overnight. At approximately 08:30, the Azerbaijani MoD stated that Armenian forces had been shelling Tartar City. At approximately 10:20, the Azerbaijani MoD stated that its units had surrounded Armenian forces with the aid of artillery fire, and that clashes continued in the Aghdara/Martakert–Tartar area of the front. At approximately 10:20, the Ministry stated that Armenian forces had started firing upon Aşağı Ağcakənd, in Goranboy District. At approximately 11:10, the Armenian MoD stated that the Azerbaijani Air Force was attacking Armenian positions in the northern direction of the front.

At approximately 12:25, the Azerbaijani MoD stated that the Armenian 7th Mountain Rifle Regiment of the 10th Mountain Rifle Division, stationed in Tonaşen, had incurred heavy losses and retreated; it released footage apparently showing the attack and stated that Azerbaijani forces attacked the command post of tan Armenian regiment of the 18th Motorized Division, inflicting casualties. The Armenian MoD stated that Armenian forces had destroyed a substantial quantity of Azerbaijani materiel, including a TOS-1A. The Ministry also stated that Azerbaijani forces had shelled the 4th Armenian Battalion, stationed in Fuzuli District, and that its forces had attacked the headquarters of an Armenian regiment of the 10th Mountain Rifle Division, stationed in Aghdara. The Armenian MoD stated that Armenian forces had destroyed Azerbaijani outposts and materiel.

== October ==
=== 1 October ===
According to the Azerbaijani MoD, clashes continued overnight, with Azerbaijani units shelling Armenian positions, while the ADA stated that the overnight situation had been relatively stable. At approximately 10:00, the Azerbaijani MoD stated that Armenian forces had been shelling Tartar City during the morning. The Armenian MoD stated that Armenian forces shot down an Azerbaijani UAV near Askeran, while the Artsakh MoD stated that Artsakh forces had repelled Azerbaijani advances. About half an hour later, it stated that Artsakh forces had downed an Azerbaijani gunship near Lalatapa, with wreckage falling into Iranian territory; Azerbaijan issued a denial.

At approximately 13:00, the Azerbaijani MoD stated that Jabrayil and Fuzuli Districts were being rocketed from Goris, in Armenia. Approximately half an hour later, it stated that Armenian forces were shelling Çocuq Mərcanlı, Horadiz, and front-line villages in Goranboy, Tartar and Aghdam Districts. At approximately 14:40, the Artsakh MoD stated that Armenian forces had downed two Azerbaijani warplanes and one helicopter; Azerbaijan issued a denial, stating it had not deployed aircraft that day. The Azerbaijani MoD reported the destruction of Armenian artillery, several Armenian air defense assets and multiple launch rocket systems. At approximately 19:00, the Ministry stated that Armenian forces had fired upon Horadiz from 17:50. At approximately 23:00, the Armenian MoD stated that Azerbaijani forces were shelling Shatvan and Mets Masrik, both in Armenia proper. Approximately half an hour later, Armenia stated it had downed an Azerbaijani UAV in Kotayk Province, in Armenia.

=== 2 October ===
According to the Azerbaijani MoD, overnight clashes continued in various areas of the front, and Azerbaijani forces captured and took control of dominant heights around Madagiz in the direction of Aghdara, while the Artsakh MoD stated that the situation had been relatively stable, if tense. At around 09:30, the Azerbaijani MoD stated that municipalities in Agdam District were under intense Armenian artillery fire. At approximately 12:40, it stated that Quzanlı in Agdam was under rocket fire from Nagorno-Karabakh, while around ten missiles were fired from Armenia into Sabirkənd in Shamkir from the Tochka-U; Armenia issued a denial. The Azerbaijani MoD then stated that Armenians had been rocketing Əmirli in Barda, together with Ağdam and Quzanlı in Tovuz District. At approximately 14:00, the Armenian MoD stated that Azerbaijani forces were bombarding Stepanakert. At around 16:40, the Azerbaijani MoD stated that Tartar City and Şıxarx, and Soğanverdilər in Barda District were under Armenian artillery fire. Approximately an hour later, the Ministry stated that Azerbaijani forces had destroyed an Armenian field control post.

=== 3 October ===
According to the Azerbaijani MoD, the situation along the front remained tense, while the Armenian MoD stated that heavy fighting was underway in the northern and southern directions of the front. At approximately 10:40, the Azerbaijani MoD stated that Tartar City and several municipalities in Tartar, together with municipalities in Agdam, as well as municipalities in Aghjabadi, together with a municipality in Goranboy, had been subjected to intensive Armenian artillery fire overnight. At approximately 12:10, the Armenian Foreign Ministry stated that the Azerbaijani military was using long-range weapons to destroy civilian infrastructure. At around 19:40, Azerbaijani President Ilham Aliyev stated that the Azerbaijani forces had taken control of Suqovuşan. He also stated that Azerbaijani forces had taken control of Talış in Tartar, several settlements in Jabrayil, and Aşağı Əbdürrəhmanlı in Fuzuli.

=== 4 October ===
Video of Azerbaijan's use of cluster munitions on Stepanakert, Nagorno-Karabakh

According to the Armenian MoD, the overnight situation along the front was relatively stable, but tense. At approximately 09:00, the Azerbaijani MoD stated that Armenian forces were rocketing Tartar City and Horadiz. At around 10:30, the Ministry stated that Armenian forces were shelling Fuzuli District, while rocketing Agdam and Tartar Districts, while the Artsakh MoD stated that Azerbaijani forces were shelling Stepanakert. Approximately half an hour later, Ganja came under bombardment. The Armenian MoD denied that this came from its territory, while Artsakh took responsibility, stating that Armenian forces had targeted and destroyed the Ganja military airbase on Ganja International Airport; Azerbaijan issued a denial. Subsequently, both a correspondent reporting from the scene for a Russian media outlet and the airport director denied that the airport, which was not operational since March due to the COVID-19 pandemic, had been shelled. At approximately 14:00, Azerbaijan stated that Azerbaijani forces had severely wounded the President of Artsakh during a visit to the front; Artsakh issued a denial. At around 16:00, the Azerbaijani MoD stated that the Armenian forces were shelling Sarıcalı in Aghjabadi, several settlements in Agdam District, and Şahvəlilər in Barda Districts. Approximately 40 minutes later, Azerbaijani President Aliyev stated that Azerbaijani forces had taken control of the city of Jabrayil, as well as several settlements in Jabrayil District. At around 17:80, the Armenian MoD released footage apparently showing Azerbaijani soldiers leaving Mataghis. At approximately 22:40, the Azerbaijani MoD stated that Armenian forces had rocketed Tartar City and Mingachevir, the latter housing a water reservoir, which Azerbaijan reported that Armenia regards as a military target; both Armenia and Artsakh issued denials. Around an hour later, the Azerbaijani authorities stated that Armenian forces had fired two medium-range missiles at Khizi and Absheron Districts.

=== 5 October ===
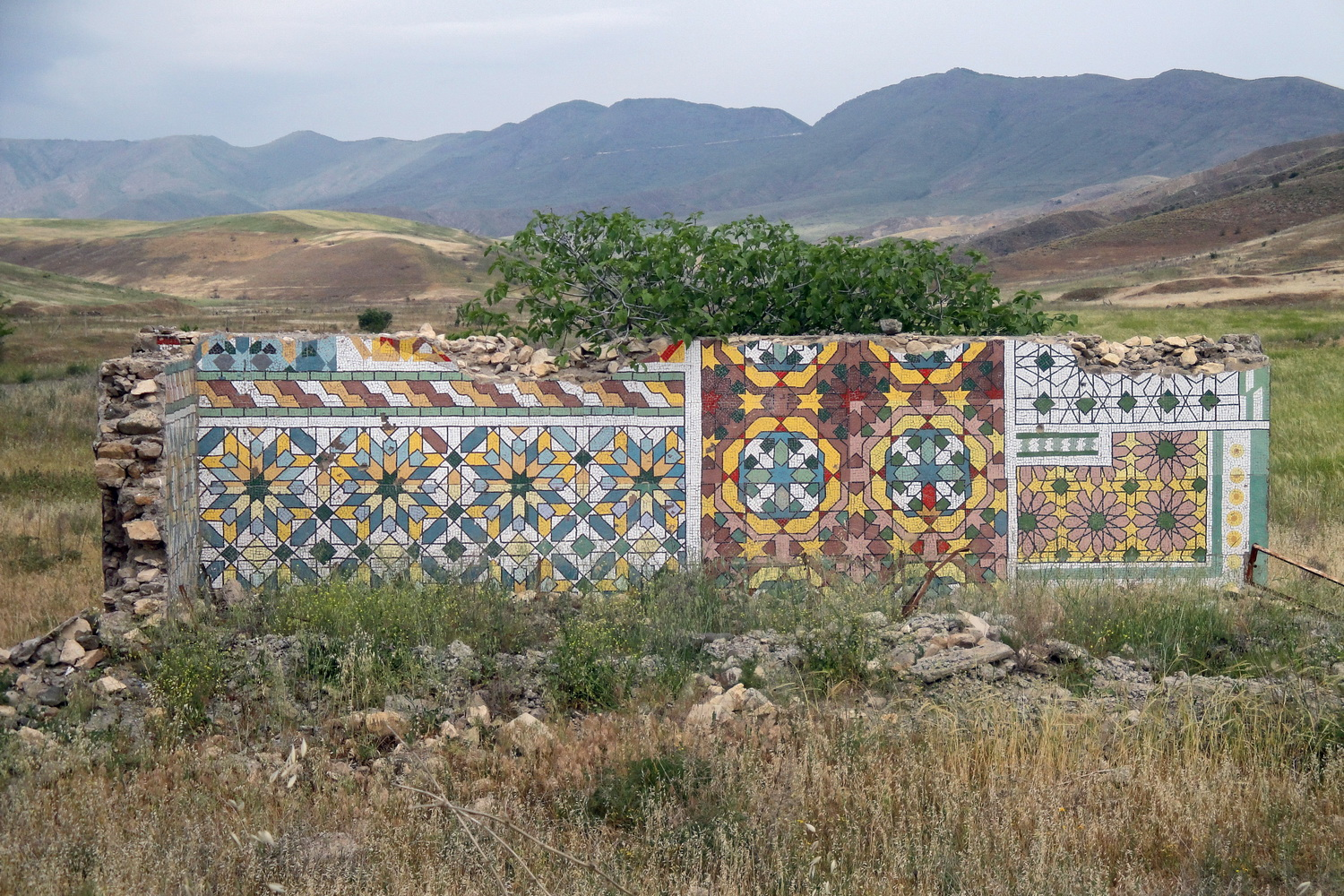
A destroyed bus stop in Jabrayil, 2014. The Azerbaijani president stated that Azerbaijan had taken control of the city on 4 October.

According to the Armenian MoD, the clashes continued with varying intensity overnight, and Azerbaijani forces launched an offensive from the south. At approximately 10:00, the Azerbaijani MoD released radar-recorded footage apparently showing rockets being fired from Jermuk, Kapan, and Berd, in Armenia. The Armenian MoD stated that Azerbaijani forces were firing rockets at Stepanakert. Approximately one hour later, the Azerbaijani MoD stated that Armenian forces were shelling the cities of Beylagan, Barda and Tartar City. At approximately midday, the Azerbaijani MoD stated that Armenian forces were shelling the cities of Horadiz and Tartar, as well as villages in Tartar, Aghjabadi, Goranboy and Goygol Districts. Azerbaijani authorities stated that Armenian forces were attacking Ganja, Barda, Beylagan and other Azerbaijani cities with missiles and rockets, while the Azerbaijani MoD stated that Ganja had come under fire from Berd, Armenia. At approximately 16:50, the Azerbaijani MoD stated that Armenian forces were shelling the cities of Aghjabadi and Beylagan. At approximately 18:00, the Azerbaijani MoD stated that a battalion of the 1st Armenian Motorized Rifle Regiment, stationed in Hadrut, had fled. At approximately 20:20, the Azerbaijani MoD stated that Armenian forces had again shelled Ganja. Azerbaijan's president stated that Azerbaijani forces had taken control of several villages in Jabrayil. Armenian forces subsequently announced a partial "tactical retreat".

=== 6 October ===
The clashes continued overnight. The Azerbaijani MoD stated its forces were in control of the entire front, while Artsakh stated that the situation was stable, if tense. The Azerbaijani MoD said that Azerbaijani forces had destroyed an Armenian ammunition depot in Ballıca . According to Azerbaijani sources, a school building and a fire engine were hit in Agdam District by Armenian rockets. At approximately 16:30, the Armenian MoD stated that Azerbaijani forces had started a new offensive on the southern front. Around half an hour later, the same Ministry stated that Azerbaijani forces were shelling Stepanakert. At approximately 19:00, the Azerbaijani MoD stated that Armenian forces were shelling Yevlakh, Goranboy and Beylagan Districts. At approximately 22:30, Azerbaijani authorities alleged that Armenia had fired missiles at the Baku-Tbilisi-Ceyhan oil pipeline, which the Azerbaijani army had prevented. Shortly after, the Armenian MoD stated that it had repeatedly denied targeting petroleum and gas infrastructure. It then stated that Armenian forces had shelled Tartar City.

=== 7 October ===
According to the Azerbaijani MoD, the clashes continued along the entire front overnight. At approximately 10:00, the Azerbaijani MoD stated that the Azerbaijani forces were in control of Jabrayil District. It also released footage apparently showing Azerbaijani forces in Şükürbəyli. Approximately half an hour later, the Ministry stated that Armenian forces were shelling villages in Tartar, Barda, Aghdam, Aghjabadi, Fuzuli and Jabrayil Districts. At approximately midday, it stated that Azerbaijani forces had seized control of new Armenian bases, while the Armenian MoD stated that Azerbaijani forces were shelling Stepanakert. At approximately 15:00, the Azerbaijani MoD stated that Armenian forces were firing upon villages in Tartar and Fuzuli Districts. At approximately 19:30, the President of Artsakh stated that Armenian forces had retaken some positions.

=== 8 October ===
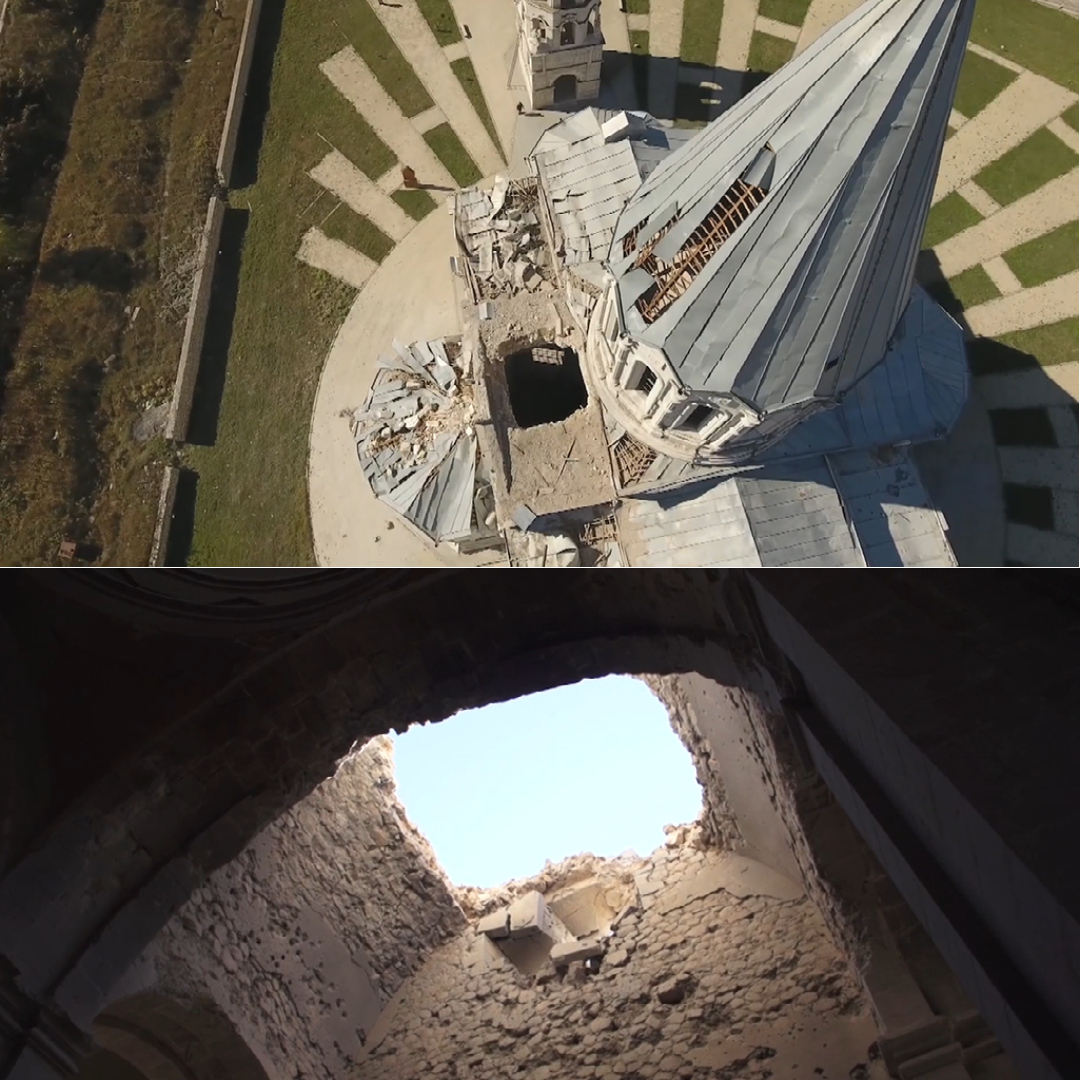
Ghazanchetsots Cathedral in Shusha. The Armenian Apostolic cathedral, a listed cultural and historical monument, was stuck twice during the war.

Clashes continued overnight; according to the Artsakh MoD, the situation was stable but tense. According to the Azerbaijani MoD, in the morning Armenian forces began shelling villages in Goranboy, Tartar, Aghdam, Barda and Aghjabedi Districts, and the city of Barda. At around midday, the Azerbaijani Presidential Office stated that Armenian forces had rocketed Ganja, Barda, Tartar and other cities with Smerch MLRS. Ghazanchetsots Cathedral in Shusha apparently came under repeated bombardment and was seriously damaged. At approximately 13:00, the Azerbaijani MoD stated that Armenian forces had fired a Tochka-U missile at the city of Barda. At approximately 15:00, the Armenian MoD stated that it was repelling Azerbaijani offensives. Subsequently, the Azerbaijani MoD stated that Armenian forces had shelled villages in Goranboy, Tartar, and Aghdam Districts.

=== 9 October ===
Clashes continued overnight; according to the Artsakh MoD, the situation was stable but tense. According to the Azerbaijani MoD, starting in the morning, Armenian forces fired upon Goranboy, Tartar, Barda, and Aghdam Districts and shelled Aghjabadi District and the city of Mingachevir. The Ministry also released footage showing villages in Jabrayil District which its forces had apparently seized control of. The Armenian MoD stated that Azerbaijani forces were bombarding Stepanakert. At approximately 14:00, the Azerbaijani authorities stated that Armenian forces had fired missiles at a mosque in Beylagan and at Goy Imam Mosque in Ganja. At around 16:30, the Azerbaijani MoD stated that Azerbaijani forces had shot down a ballistic missile during flight from Armenia to Mingachevir. At approximately 17:00, the Azerbaijani President stated that Azerbaijani forces had taken control of Hadrut, together with multiple villages; Artsakh issued a denial. During the day, the Azerbaijani MoD released footage apparently showing the setting of Sugovushan and the streets of Talış, again reporting an Azerbaijani presence in the contested villages.

=== 10 October - Russia-brokered ceasefire ===
Just before 04:00 (00:00 GMT) on October 10, Russia reported that both Armenia and Azerbaijan had agreed on a humanitarian ceasefire after 10 hours of talks in Moscow (the Moscow Statement) and announced that both would enter "substantive" talks. Hostilities were formally halted at 12:00 (08:00 GMT), to allow an exchange of prisoners and the recovery of the dead, facilitated by the International Committee of the Red Cross (ICRC). Violations of the ceasefire have been persistent, leading to the ICRC halting attempts to recover the dead and exchange wounded and prisoners, as well as prompting fears of a humanitarian crisis.

Armenia and Azerbaijan accused each other of bombarding civilian settlements prior to the ceasefire, with both sides denying the other's accusations. Each side also accused the other of breaking the ceasefire. Clashes broke out soon afterward, with heavy fighting in Hadrut and shelling, with Azerbaijan moving deeper into the conflict zone. Both Artsakh and Azerbaijan accused each other of attacking Hadrut, which saw heavy fighting. At around 23:00, the Azerbaijani MoD stated that Armenian forces were shelling Tartar, while the Armenian MoD stated that Azerbaijani forces were bombarding Stepanakert; Azerbaijan issued a denial.

=== 11 October ===
The situation was reasonably calm, with minor violations. At approximately 02:30, the Azerbaijani MoD stated that Armenian forces had hit Ganja with a Scud missile, fired from Berd, Armenia, killing 10 and injuring 33 civilians; this was officially denied but subsequently confirmed. Azerbaijan also stated that Armenian forces had fired missiles at the Mingachevir Hydroelectric Power Station. At approximately 18:00, the Azerbaijani MoD stated that Armenian forces were shelling villages in several districts.

=== 12 October ===
Minor clashes continued, with the Azerbaijani MoD stating their forces obtained operational advantage; Azerbaijan stated that Armenian forces had tried to retake Hadrut. The Azerbaijani MoD then stated that Armenian forces were shelling several districts. At approximately 15:00, Azerbaijani forces reported operational control over several villages but had not entered them.

=== 13 October ===
Fighting resumed in several districts, with Armenian forces apparently shelling several. In the evening, the Azerbaijani MoD stated they controlled parts of Hadrut, but this was limited to neighboring heights and Tağaser, not Hadrut's center.

=== 14 October ===
Fighting continued; at approximately 09:00, the Azerbaijani MoD stated that Armenian forces were shelling several districts. Azerbaijan said they controlled over three villages in Fuzuli and five in Khojavend. Overnight, Azerbaijan reported to have destroyed OTR-21 Tochka missile launchers situated in two locations in areas of Armenia bordering Kalbajar District that it stated were targeting its cities.

Russia, engaging in high-level shuttle diplomacy and seeking to verify the Azerbaijani strike, reiterated its appeal to both sides to end fighting and indicated a readiness to deploy a military observer mission to the front to assist in securing the truce. This was agreed to by Armenia, and conditionally by Azerbaijan. Turkey and Azerbaijan maintained that the Minsk Group had failed to achieve a lasting solution to the war and insisted on four-way negotiations that would involve Armenia, Azerbaijan, Russia, and Turkey.

=== 15 October ===
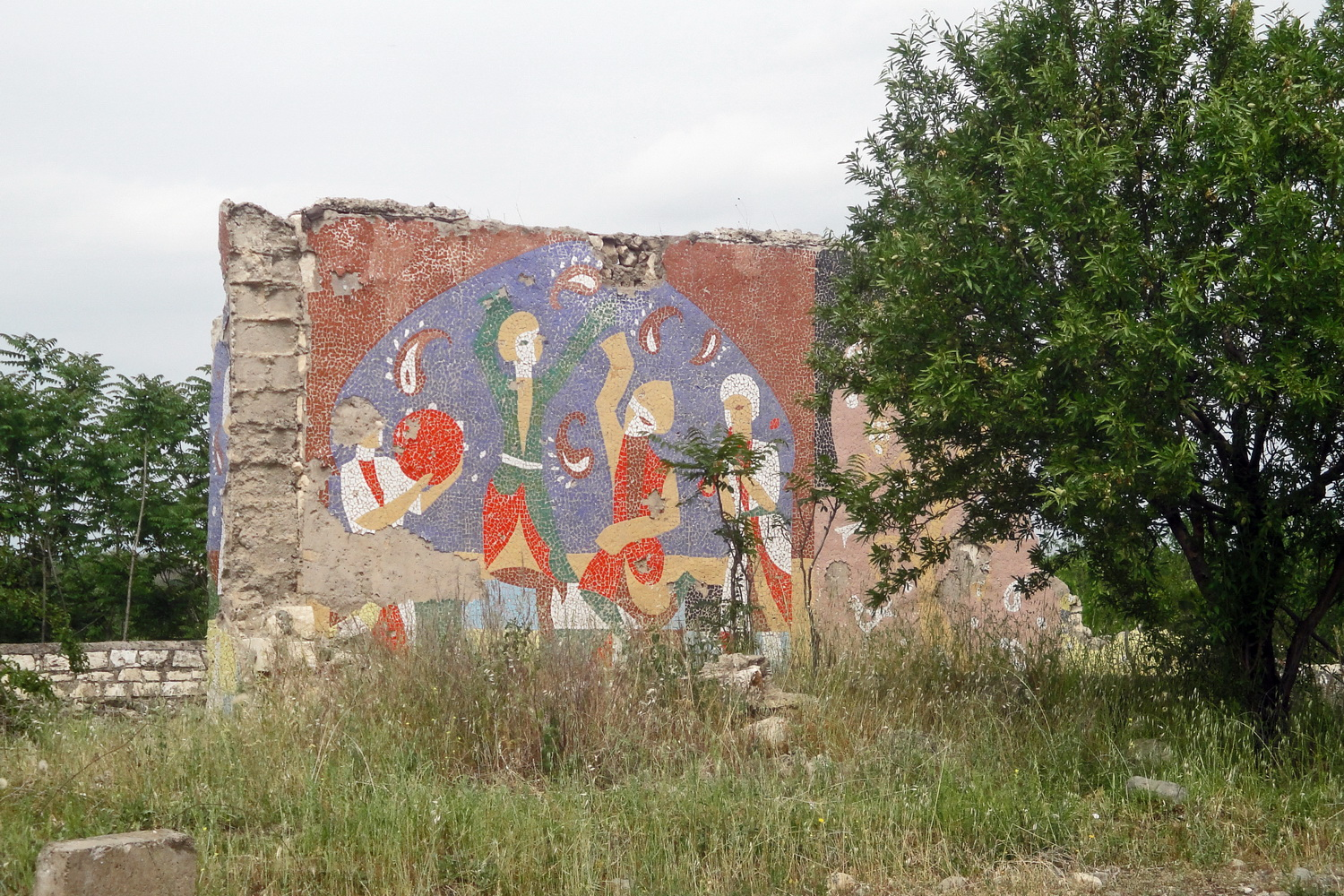
Ruins of Fuzuli in 2014. On 17 October, Azerbaijani President Ilham Aliyev stated that Azerbaijani forces had taken control of the city.

Fighting continued; the Azerbaijani MoD stated that Armenian forces had shelled a funeral in Tartar, killing four civilians and injuring four, witnessed by a TV Rain correspondent. The Armenian MoD stated Azerbaijan forces were shelling along the front, with the Qirmizi Bazar in Martuni Province being shelled with BM-30 Smerch. The Azerbaijan MOD stated its forces had seized control of Arış in Fuzuli, Doşulu in Jabrayil, and several settlements in Khojavend District.

=== 16 October ===
Fighting continued overnight. The Armenian MoD reported intense shelling by Azerbaijani forces, including in Şuşakənd in Askeran; while Artsakh authorities stated that the Azerbaijani forces were shelling of Khojavend and nearby settlements. The Azerbaijani MoD stated that Armenian forces were shelling Goranboy, Tartar, Aghdam and Aghjabadi Districts. In the evening, the Azerbaijani MoD stated that the previous day Armenian forces had fired a missile at Ordubad, in Nakhchivan; Armenian authorities issued a denial. Azerbaijan stated it had taken control of some settlements in Khojavend District.

=== 17 October ===
The Armenian MoD stated that Stepanakert and Shusha had been rocketed and shelled at dawn, including with cluster munitions. Overnight, Mingachevir and Ganja in Azerbaijan were attacked, the latter with several Scud missiles.

Azerbaijani authorities subsequently stated that the attack on Ganja had killed at least 13 civilians and injured over 52; the Armenian MoD issued a denial of responsibility and reported to have downed two Azerbaijani drones in its Syunik Province, subsequently denied by Azerbaijan. The Azerbaijani MOD said they had downed an Armenian SU-25, denied by Armenia, and to have control of Fuzuli and several villages. At around 18:15, the Armenian MoD reported to have downed three Azerbaijani UAVs in Armenia.

In the evening an agreement was reached for a humanitarian ceasefire from midnight.

=== 18 October - French-brokered ceasefire ===
In the early morning, both sides accused each other of immediately violating the newly agreed ceasefire. The Armenian MoD stated Azerbaijani forces had shelled along the front, launching another offensive along the Aras River and hitting Stepanakert, while the Azerbaijani MoD stated its forces had repelled Armenian attacks in Gadabay and Tovuz Districts, from Armenia's Chambarak and Berd, along the Armenian–Azerbaijani state border. Around an hour later, an "RIA Novosti" correspondent reported an exchange of heavy artillery near Hadrut. At approximately 12:30, the Azerbaijani MoD stated they had downed an Armenian Su-25 warplane, which it stated had been attacking towards Jabrayil; Armenia issued a denial.

In the evening, Azerbaijani authorities stated that they were willing to transfer the dead through a corridor in Tovuz, Azerbaijan and Tavush, Armenia. The Azerbaijani president stated Azerbaijani forces had captured the Khodaafarin Bridges and Dam. At approximately 19:00, Azerbaijani forces captured Fuzuli.

=== 19 October ===
Clashes continued overnight, with the Azerbaijani MoD reporting operational superiority; it stated that Armenian forces were shelling Goranboy, Tartar, and Aghdam Districts and firing on Aghjabadi District. At approximately 08:00, the Azerbaijani president stated that Azerbaijani forces had taken several villages in Jabrayil District. Subsequently, the Armenian MoD stated that Azerbaijani forces had started shelling and advancing. At midday, Azerbaijani authorities stated Armenia had fired missiles at the Baku–Novorossiysk pipeline but missed; Armenia issued a denial. The Armenian MoD initially stated that the situation was less tense but subsequently stated that clashes continued along the front.

=== 20 October ===
Overnight, clashes intensified, specifically near Martakert, Hadrut, and Zəngilan, involving Azerbaijani offensives. At approximately midday, the Azerbaijani MoD stated that Armenian forces were shelling Agdam and Tartar Districts. Around two hours later, the Azerbaijani president stated that Azerbaijani forces had control of Zəngilan, the administrative center of Zangilan District, and several villages in Zangilan, Fuzuli, Jabrayil, and Khojavend Districts; he renamed Vəng to Çinarlı. Soon after, the Azerbaijani MoD released footage showing Zəngilan, and BBC Russian Service confirmed Azerbaijan's statements. In turn, the Armenian MoD stated that Azerbaijani forces were retreating along the Aras River; Azerbaijan issued a denial.

=== 21 October ===
Overnight, clashes further intensified, specifically in Zangilan and Martakert Districts, and near Hadrut. In the morning, Azerbaijan accused Armenia of shelling Tartar; Armenia accused Azerbaijan of shelling Martakert. At approximately 20:30, President of Azerbaijan, Ilham Aliyev stated that Azerbaijani forces had seized control of 22 settlements within Fuzuli, Jabrayil and Zangilan districts.

=== 22 October ===
Clashes continued overnight with varying intensity, specifically near Martakert, Hadrut, and Zəngilan. The Armenian MoD stated that Khojavend was also shelled overnight by Azerbaijani forces. In turn, the Azerbaijani MoD stated that ballistic missiles were launched from the territory of Armenia to Qabala and Kürdəmir at 09:00 local time; Armenia issued a denial. At midday, the Azerbaijani MoD stated that the Azerbaijani forces had shot down an Armenian drone in Nakhchivan. At approximately 17:30, the President of Azerbaijan stated that the Azerbaijani forces had seized control of several villages in Fuzuli and Jabrayil districts. In addition, he stated that Azerbaijani forces had gained control of Ağbənd in Zangilan District, releasing supposed confirmatory footage. According to Aliyev, with this, Azerbaijani forces had secured control over the Azerbaijan–Iran border. Armenia issued a denial and stated that heavy clashes took place near Qacar in Fuzuli. Around an hour later, the Armenian MoD stated that intense clashes occurred along the entire front, especially in Martuni Province.

=== 23 October ===
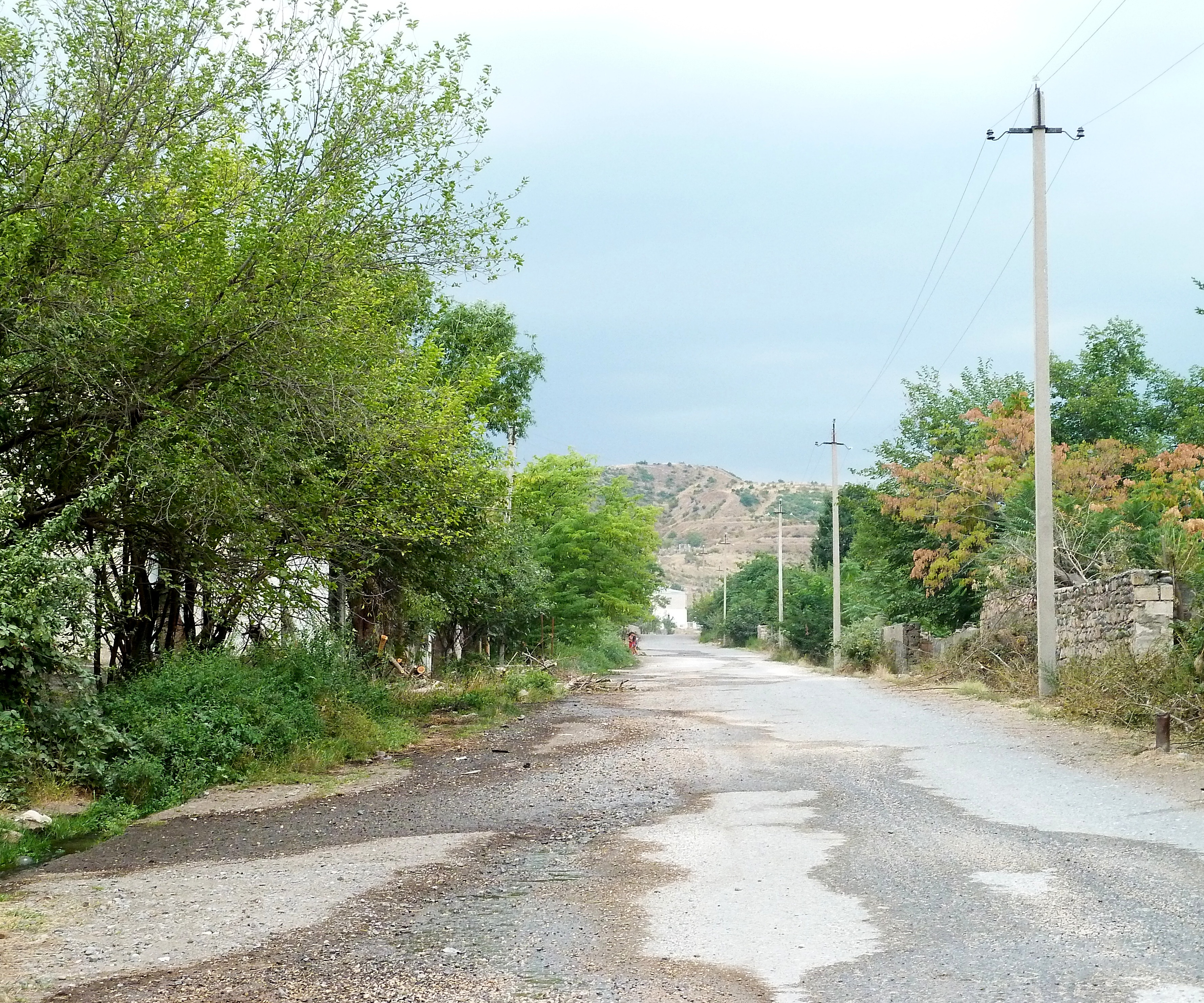
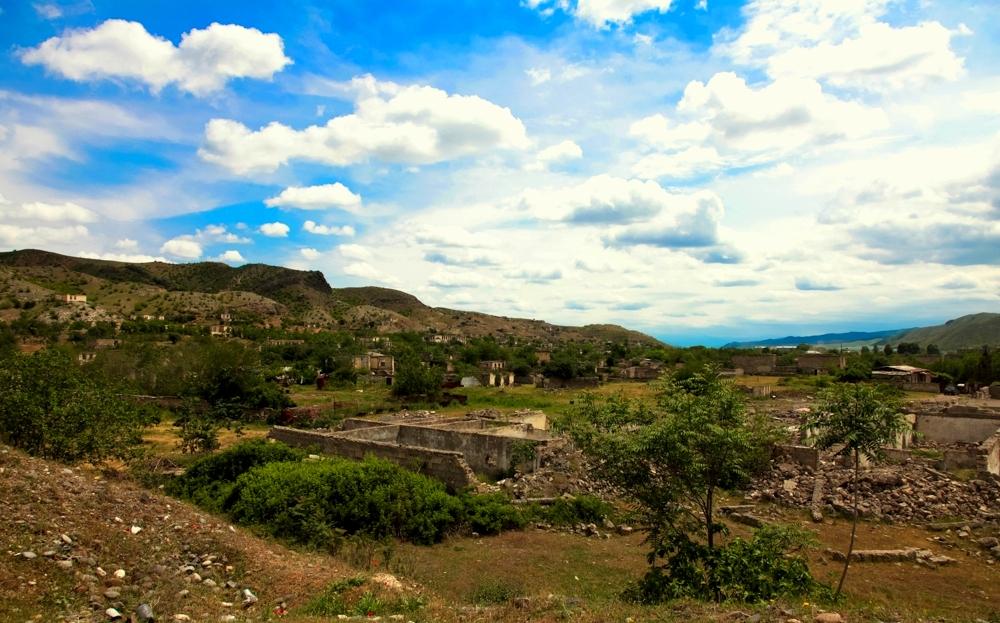
On mid-October, Azerbaijan stated that their forces had seized control of Zangelan (above) and Qubadli (below) in southern and southwestern areas of the region.

Overnight, clashes continued, specifically near Martakert, Hadrut, and Qubadlı. At approximately 09:00, the Artsakh authorities stated that Azerbaijani forces had rocketed several villages in Martuni Province using BM-30 Smerch. Azerbaijan issued a denial; it stated that Armenian forces had intensively shelled villages in Tartar, Aghdam and Aghjabadi Districts. In the evening, the Azerbaijani president stated that Azerbaijani forces had control of several villages in Khojavend, Fuzuli, Zangilan, and Gubadly Districts. The Azerbaijani MoD also released supposed confirmatory footage from one of the villages. Then, President of Azerbaijan, Ilham Aliyev, confirmed that the National Hero of Azerbaijan, Shukur Hamidov was killed during the operations in Qubadli District. Shortly after, Artsakh authorities stated that Azerbaijani forces were attacking Laçın, as well as shelling Khojavend and Martakert. In the night, the Artsakh authorities stated that the Azerbaijani forces were shelling Stepanakert; Azerbaijan issued a denial.

=== 24 October ===
Overnight, clashes continued, specifically near Qubadlı. At approximately midday, the Azerbaijani MoD stated that the Armenian forces were rocketing Naftalan and Tartar, while shelling Lachin District from the territory of Armenia; Armenia issued a denial and stated that Laçın was under Artsakh control. A BBC Russian Service correspondent confirmed that the city of Laçın was controlled by the Armenians, but was under heavy Azerbaijani shelling. In the evening, the Azerbaijani MoD stated that the Armenian forces attempted to attack the Azerbaijani positions in Zangilan from Syunik Province of Armenia. At about 19:30, the Artsakh authorities stated that the Azerbaijani forces were shelling Khojavend.

=== 25 October ===
Overnight, clashes continued with varying intensity, with the Azerbaijani MoD stating that its forces had seized control of further territory. In the morning, the Artsakh authorities stated that several villages in Martuni Province were being shelled. At about midday, the Azerbaijani MoD stated that Armenian forces were shelling several villages in Tartar, Aghdam and Aghjabadi Districts. In the evening, the Azerbaijani MoD released footage from Zangilan and Jabrayil Districts, in the very southwest of the theater of operations, near the Aras River and the Iranian border. At approximately 20:30, the Artsakh authorities stated that Azerbaijani forces were shelling several villages in Askeran Province, close to Shusha. At approximately 23:00, the Azerbaijani president stated that Azerbaijani forces had seized control of Qubadlı, the administrative center of Gubadly District; Azerbaijan released confirmary footage. Subsequently, the Armenian MoD stated that heavy clashes were occurring. In the evening, the United States announced that both sides had agreed to a humanitarian ceasefire from the morning of 26 October.

=== 26 October - United States-brokered ceasefire ===
In the morning, the ceasefire again collapsed. According to Eurasianet, the Azerbaijani MoD claimed via Twitter at 08:03 that Armenia violated the ceasefire, and then deleted the tweet and posted another one claiming that the ceasefire was broken by Armenia at 08:05. According to Armenia, Azerbaijani artillery commenced shelling Armenian positions at 08:45. Subsequently, the Azerbaijani MoD stated that Armenian forces were shelling the city of Tartar and surrounding villages and firing upon Azerbaijani positions in Səfiyan in Lachin District. The Artsakh authorities and the Armenian prime minister stated that they were "strictly observing" the ceasefire. At approximately 10:30, Azerbaijani authorities stated that Armenian forces in Berd, Chambarak and Vardenis were firing upon Azerbaijani positions in Gadabay, Dashkasan and Tovuz Districts. Approximately one hour later, the Artsakh authorities stated that Azerbaijani forces had launched an air strike on Khojavend; Azerbaijan issued a denial. At approximately 13:00, the president of Azerbaijan stated that Azerbaijani forces had seized control of several villages in Jabrayil, Zangilan and Gubadly Districts along the Hakari Valley. Armenian authorities confirmed that Azerbaijani forces had launched an offensive in the region. At approximately 15:30, the Azerbaijani MoD stated that Armenian forces were shelling Aghjabadi District. Approximately one hour later, the Azerbaijani MoD stated that the Armenian forces were again shelling Tartar. In the evening, the Armenian MoD stated that the Azerbaijani shelling had drastically intensified, and the Artsakh authorities stated that the Azerbaijanis were continuing to launch new offensives, while the Azerbaijani MoD released footage, apparently from Padar. Subsequently, the Armenian authorities confirmed that they had lost Qubadlı, and that the Azerbaijani forces had reached the Armenia–Azerbaijan border in the south. Also, the Azerbaijani MoD released footage taken in Xanlıq.

=== 27 October ===
Overnight, clashes continued, with the Azerbaijani MoD stating that the Armenian forces had shelled their positions in Khojavend, Fuzuli and Qubadli. At approximately midday, the Armenian MoD stated that the Azerbaijani forces had struck an Armenian border post in the very south of the country, at the junction of the Armenian, Azerbaijani and Iranian borders; Azerbaijan issued a denial. In the meanwhile, Artsakh authorities stated that its defense minister Jalal Harutyunyan was wounded in action. Although, unofficial Azerbaijani military sources alleged that he was killed and released footage apparently showing the assassination from drone camera. About two hours later, the Azerbaijani authorities stated that the Armenian forces were shelling Tartar and its surrounding villages. At approximately 18:00, the Azerbaijani authorities stated that the Armenian forces had struck Bərdə with a ballistic missile, killing 4 civilians and injuring 13 more; Armenia denied responsibility for the strike. At approximately 20:00, the Armenian MoD stated that the Azerbaijani forces were shelling Khojavend and Laçın; Azerbaijan issued a denial.

=== 28 October ===
Overnight, the Azerbaijani MoD claimed it had repulsed several Armenian counterattacks near Martakert, Khojavend, Fuzuli, Zangilan and Qubadli, while the Armenian MoD claimed ongoing operations to destroy "sabotage groups". In the early morning, the Azerbaijani MoD stated that the Armenian forces had shelled Tartar District; Armenia issued a denial. In midday, the Artsakh authorities stated that the Azerbaijani forces were shelling Shusha and the situation in Çanaqçı was tense. Azerbaijan denied shelling Shusha and its MoD released a footage, according to BBC Russian Service, from northeast of Qubadlı. At approximately 14:00, the Azerbaijani authorities stated that the Armenian forces had launched BM-30 Smerch missiles with cluster munition on Bərdə, killing 21 civilians and wounding 70 more. Armenia denied responsibility and stated that the Azerbaijani forces were shelling Stepanakert, while the Azerbaijani MoD stated that the Armenian forces were also shelling Goranboy and Tartar Districts. In the evening, President of Azerbaijan, Ilham Aliyev, stated that the Azerbaijani forces had seized control of several villages in Qubadli, Zangilan, Fuzuli and Jabrayil Districts.

=== 29 October ===
Overnight, clashes continued, with the Azerbaijani authorities stating that they had repelled Armenian attacks near Khojavend, Fuzuli and Qubadli. In the morning, both sides accused each other shelling civilians. At about 10:00, the Azerbaijani MoD stated that the Armenian forces were shelling Tartar and Goranboy. At about midday, the Armenian MoD stated that clashes were taking place in Çanaqçı, a few kilometers southeast of Shusha. Subsequently, the Azerbaijani MoD released footage from newly captured villages in Hakari Valley. In the evening, President of Artsakh, Arayik Harutyunyan stated that the Azerbaijani forces were already 5 kilometres (3.1 mi) from Shusha, the second largest city in Nagorno-Karabakh.

=== 30 October ===
Clashes continued overnight, especially near Shusha. At about midday, the Azerbaijani authorities stated that the Armenian forces in Goris, Armenia, were shelling the Azerbaijani position in Qubadli District. Shortly after, the Armenian MoD stated that heavy clashes were taking place in the south of Nagorno-Karabakh. Then, the Artsakh authorities stated that the clashes in the south were intensified. In the evening, Amnesty International reported first confirmed use of cluster munitions by Armenia, describing it as "cruel and reckless". Subsequently, President of Azerbaijan, Ilham Aliyev, stated that the Azerbaijani forces had seized control of several villages in Jabrayil, Zangilan and Qubadli Districts. At about 17:30, an Abkhazian Network News Agency correspondent reported that powerful explosions were heard near Shusha and Stepanakert. Iran criticized the Minsk Group saying that ‘no real desire to establish peace’ on both sides.

=== 31 October ===
Overnight, the clashes continued, with Azerbaijani authorities stating that the Armenian forces had shelled Azerbaijani positions. Armenia stated Azerbaijan was using prohibited phosphorus munitions over Nagorno Karabakh, setting fires to the forests in the vicinity of settlements; Both sides start accusing each other of bombing residential areas in defiance of a pact. Azerbaijan issued a denial. Before midday, the Armenian Prime Minister Nikol Pashinyan appealed to Russian President Vladimir Putin with a request to start consultations to determine the form of support for ensuring Armenia's security. In return, Russia's Foreign Ministry then said that they would be prepared to render "all necessary assistance" to treaty partner Armenia if the Nagorno-Karabakh conflict expanded to Armenian territory. In the evening, the Artsakh authorities stated that the Azerbaijani forces were shelling Shusha. About an hour later, the Azerbaijani authorities stated that the Armenian forces were shelling the villages in Tartar District, as well as Qiyaməddinli in Aghjabadi District. At approximately 18:00, the Azerbaijani MoD stated that there were ongoing clashes near Martakert and Khojavend, Armenia confirmed this at night, but stated the intensity of the clashes were lowered by then.

== November ==
=== 1 November ===
Overnight, the clashes continued, especially near Martakert, Aghdam, Khojavend and Qubadli. In the morning, the Azerbaijani authorities stated that the Armenian forces in Berd, Chambarak and Goris were firing upon Azerbaijani positions located in Tovuz, Gadabay and Qubadli Districts. In return, Artsakh authorities stated that Martakert was under bombardment, while a RIA Novosti correspondent stated Stepanakert was being shelled. Artsakh authorities stated that shelling of both cities continued into the evening, while, according to Azerbaijan, the Armenian forces shelled villages in Aghjabadi and Tartar Districts. Ilham Aliyev the President of Azerbaijan vows fight ‘to the end’ if talks fail.

=== 2 November ===
Overnight, the clashes continued, especially near Khojavend, Aghdam and Qubadlı. The MoD of Artsakh announced that the Deputy Commander of the Artsakh Defence Army, Artur Sargsyan, had been killed in combat. In the evening, President of Azerbaijan, Ilham Aliyev stated that the Azerbaijani forces had seized control of several villages in Jabrayil, Zangilan, and Qubadli Districts. Subsequently, the Armenian MoD stated that fierce clashes were taking place near Khojavend and Shusha. At night, the Armenian MoD stated that David Bek in Syunik, Armenia was shelled.

=== 3 November ===
Overnight, the clashes continued, especially near Khojavend, and Martakert, as well as Zəngilan and Qubadlı. In the morning, the Azerbaijani MoD stated that Füzuli was being rocketed with BM-30 Smerches from the territory of Armenia; Armenia issued a denial. At night, Armenian authorities stated that clashes took place in Taqaverd, while the Azerbaijani authorities stated that tank warfare took place near Khojavend.

=== 4 November ===
Overnight, the clashes continued, especially near Aghdam, Khojavend, Zəngilan, Qubadlı, Lachin, and Shusha. Subsequently, the Armenian forces closed the Shusha–Lachin road for civilians. The President of Azerbaijan, Ilham Aliyev, stated that the Azerbaijani forces had seized control of several villages.

=== 5 November ===
Overnight, the clashes continued, especially near Khojavend. In the morning, the Armenian authorities stated that Khojavend, as well as Lachin and Shusha were heavily shelled. In the evening, the Azerbaijani authorities stated that the Armenian forces were shelling Tartar and Səhləbad, as well as Hacıturalı and Əfətli in Aghdam District.

=== 6 November ===
Overnight, the clashes continued, especially near Shusha. In the morning, Artsakh authorities stated that Stepanakert was being shelled.

=== 7 November ===
President Aliyev stated that the Azerbaijani army had captured 16 villages of Fuzuli, Jabrayil, Qubadli, Zangilan, Khojaly and Khojavend districts.

The Armenian MoD stated that heavy clashes continued near Shusha, with multiple Azeri attacks having been repelled overnight - and toward Martuni region and Berdzor.

=== 8 November ===
At mid-day, Azerbaijani president formally announced that the Azerbaijani forces had captured Shusha. This claim was acknowledged by senior Turkish officials on a visit to Baku as well as by Turkey's president, who extended congratulations.

The Armenian government stated that the battle near Shusha was ongoing. Furthermore, late in the evening, the MoD of Armenia stated: "[...] the overall situation can be assessed as quite favorable. Our troops are able to hamper all the attempts for a success of the adversary, but the clashes are still going on. It's already 3–4 days that in fact, clashes for Shushi continue at night hours." Russian military observers, experts, and journalists concurred that Shusha had not been captured. All of them turned out to be wrong later, while Armenian leadership after ceasefire declared that Shusha was fully captured by Azerbaijani forces on 7 November. The Armenian Unified Info Center reported the downing of a Bayraktar TB2 drone by Armenian forces in the southeast.

=== 9 November ===
At midday, Azerbaijani president stated that 23 villages of had been captured. The MoD of Armenia stated that fighting "near the town of Shushi" continued, while Azerbaijani military's attempts to attack near Khojavend, Martakert, and Taqaverd had been repelled. A spokesman for Artsakh confirmed that Armenian forces were no longer in control of Shusha. A Russian military expert noted that apparently both the Armenian forces and the local population had deserted the town without any resistance following the Azerbaijani storming of the town in early morning of 8 November in order to avoid encirclement.

The MoD of Azerbaijan released a video purported to show Azerbaijani forces′ control of Shusha. Late in the evening, Azerbaijani president stated that "48 more villages, 1 settlement and 8 strategic hills" in the Jabrayil, Qubadli, Zangilan, Khojaly, Khojavend, and Lachin districts had been captured.

In the evening, the MoD of Russia reported that a Russian Mi-24 gunship had been downed by a surface-to-air missile over Armenia close to the village of Yeraskh, near the border with Azerbaijan's Nakhchivan Autonomous Republic, killing two crew members and injuring a third. The downing was promptly owned up to by Azerbaijan, who said it was an accident and offered an apology.

In the late night hours, the prime minister of Armenia wrote on his Facebook page that he and Russia's and Azerbaijan's presidents had signed a statement on ending the war in Nagorno-Karabakh from 01:00 (00:00 Moscow Time) of the following day. Pashinyan's statement was followed by Putin's elaborating that Russian peace-keepers would be deployed along the line of contact. The news about the ceasefire agreement provoked violent popular unrest in Yerevan, with the protesters heading to the presidential palace demanding that power be handed over to Armenia's military.

=== 10 November ===
In the early morning, the MoD of Russia announced that about 2,000 Russian peace-keepers had been dispatched to Nagorno-Karabakh. Meanwhile, Artsakh's Defense Army reported that Azeri forces were carrying out artillery and rocket strikes in all the main directions of the front line, targeting also civilian settlements.

== See also ==
- List of ongoing armed conflicts
