= VOMA =

Art of Survival
- Ողջ մնալու արվեստ
- Active: 2014–present
- Allegiance: Armenia
- Role: Counter-offensive special forces
- Engagements: Nagorno-Karabakh conflict; July 2020 Armenian–Azerbaijani clashes; 2021–2022 Armenia–Azerbaijan border crisis
- Website: www.voma.center/hy

VOMA (Armenian: Ողջ մնալու արվեստ, lit. 'Art of Survival') is an Armenian non-governmental organization established in 2014, created by a group of professional military personnel and veterans who announced their purpose to develop a society capable of defending itself in a war.

== Activity ==
The primary idea of the VOMA organization is that the training of reservists, recruits and volunteers from Armenia and the Armenian diaspora will help creating a more powerful state and become a better reserve army. The organization conducts courses for people over 16 years old.

The courses cover a number of areas: firearms training, archery, survival training, close-quarters combat, Wing Chun, knife throwing, rock climbing, Applied Biology, first aid and medical treatment training, psychology and interrogation training, cartography and Razmapar, a traditional Armenian dance in celebration of war.

== Ideology ==
=== Nation-Army Concept ===
According to VOMA, the purpose of the nation-army concept and one of the major goals of VOMA is to create a reserve army consisting of 300-800 thousand trained personnel, which will help to fill the losses suffered by the main army during combat operations, as well as provide an opportunity to carry out counter-offensive operations.

== Armenian-Azerbaijani War (2020) ==
In 2020, during the Nagorno-Karabakh War, VOMA carried out military activities not only by participating in actual combat operations, but also by preparing volunteer groups. Immediately after the start of the war, the formation of the VOMA Battalion began on the basis of the Artsakh Defence Army, which moved to Artsakh on 29 September 2020. VOMA Battalion was tasked with the duty of protecting the villages of Karvachar, Karmir Shuka, and Taghavard in Martun.

In a December 2021 paper submitted to the United Nations Office on Drugs and Crime the Republic of Azerbaijan has described VOMA as a "terrorist organization of Armenia" and has urged the UN member states to prevent financial transactions that would support VOMA.

== See also ==
- Military of Armenia
