= Həmənli =

- Location within Azerbaijan
- Coordinates: 40°42′55″N 46°47′56″E
- Country: Azerbaijan
- Rayon: Goranboy
- Municipality: Qaramusalı
- Elevation: 91 m (299 ft)
- Time zone: UTC+4 (AZT)
  - Summer (DST): UTC+5 (AZT)

Həmənli is a village in the Goranboy Rayon of Azerbaijan. The village forms part of the municipality of Qaramusalı.
