= Avetaranots, Nagorno-Karabakh =

Avetaranots / Chanakhchi Ավետարանոց / Çanaqçı
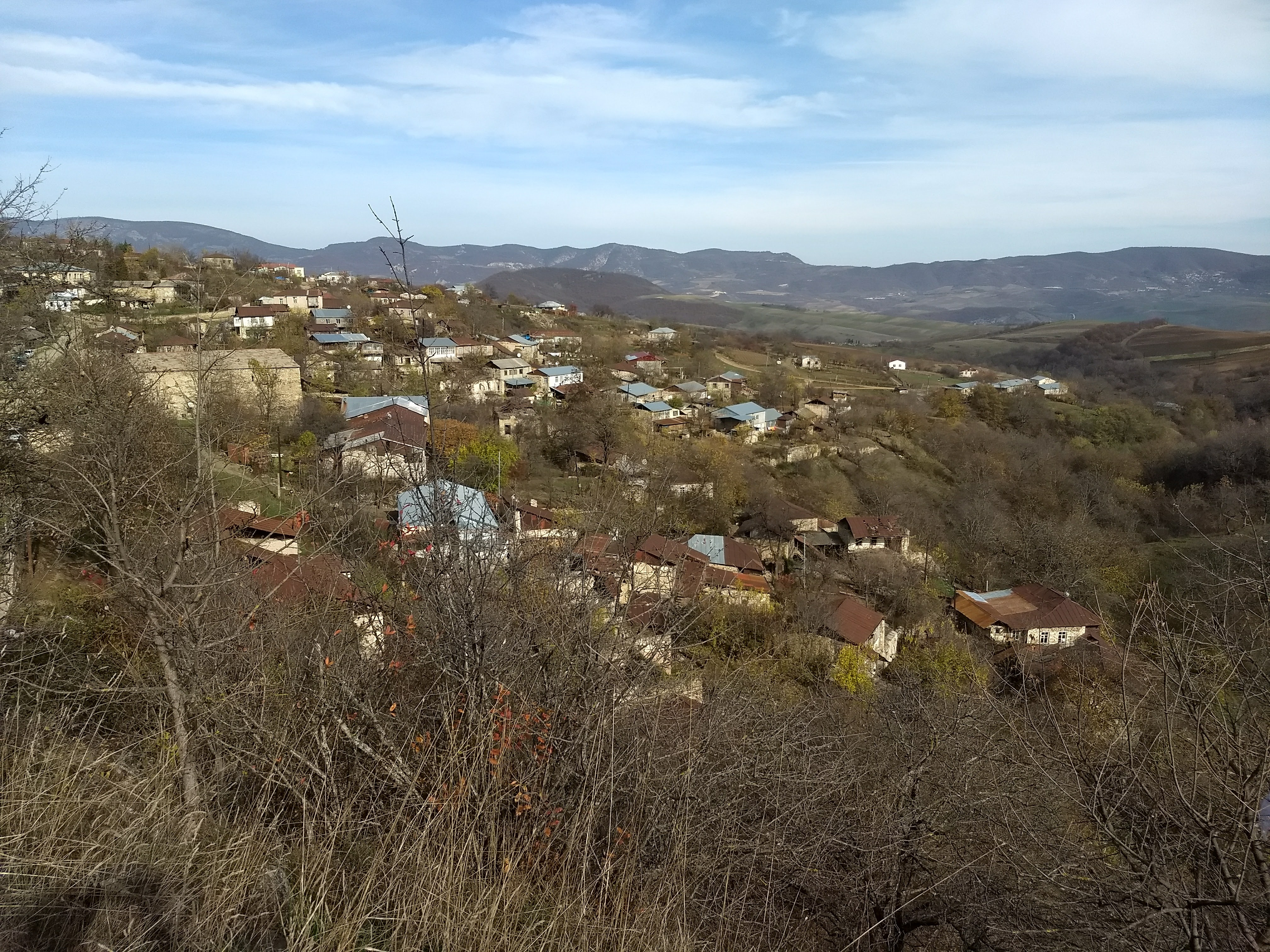

- Location within Azerbaijan Location within Karabakh Economic Region
- Coordinates: 39°42′11″N 46°49′50″E
- Country: Azerbaijan
- District: Khojaly

Population (2015)
  - Total: 1,121
- Time zone: UTC+4 (AZT)

Avetaranots (Armenian: Ավետարանոց) or Chanakhchi (Armenian: Չանախչի; Azerbaijani: Çanaqçı) is a village in the Khojaly District of Azerbaijan, in the region of Nagorno-Karabakh. The village had an ethnic Armenian-majority population prior to the 2020 Nagorno-Karabakh war, and also had an Armenian majority in 1989. Prior to 2020, the village was controlled by the Republic of Artsakh.

== History ==
The village is the birthplace of Valerian Madatov (1782–1829), an Armenian melik (prince) in the Principality of Varanda, and later lieutenant general of the Russian Empire.

During the Soviet period, the village was a part of the Askeran District of the Nagorno-Karabakh Autonomous Oblast. The village was administrated by the breakaway Republic of Artsakh as part of its Askeran Province after the First Nagorno-Karabakh War. The village was captured by Azerbaijani forces on 9 November 2020, during the 2020 Nagorno-Karabakh war.

== Historical heritage sites ==
Historical heritage sites in and around the village include tombs from the 2nd–1st millennia BCE, a 12th/13th-century khachkar, the monastery of Kusanats Anapat (Armenian: Կուսանաց Անապատ) built in 1616, the church of Surb Astvatsatsin (Armenian: Սուրբ Աստվածածին, lit. 'Holy Mother of God') built in 1651, the 17th/18th-century Chanakhchi Fortress, and a 19th-century cemetery.

== Demographics ==
The village had 1,039 inhabitants in 2005, and 1,121 inhabitants in 2015.

== Gallery ==
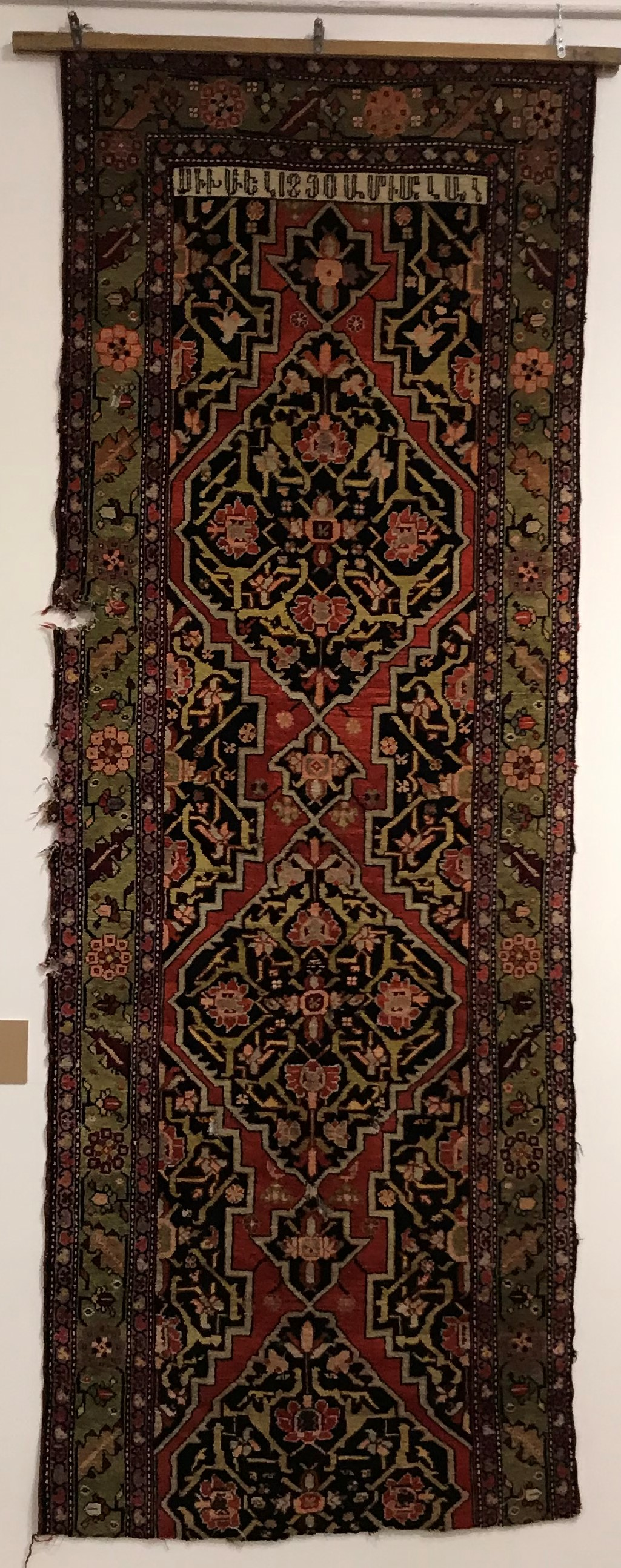
19th century Armenian carpet "Meghu"

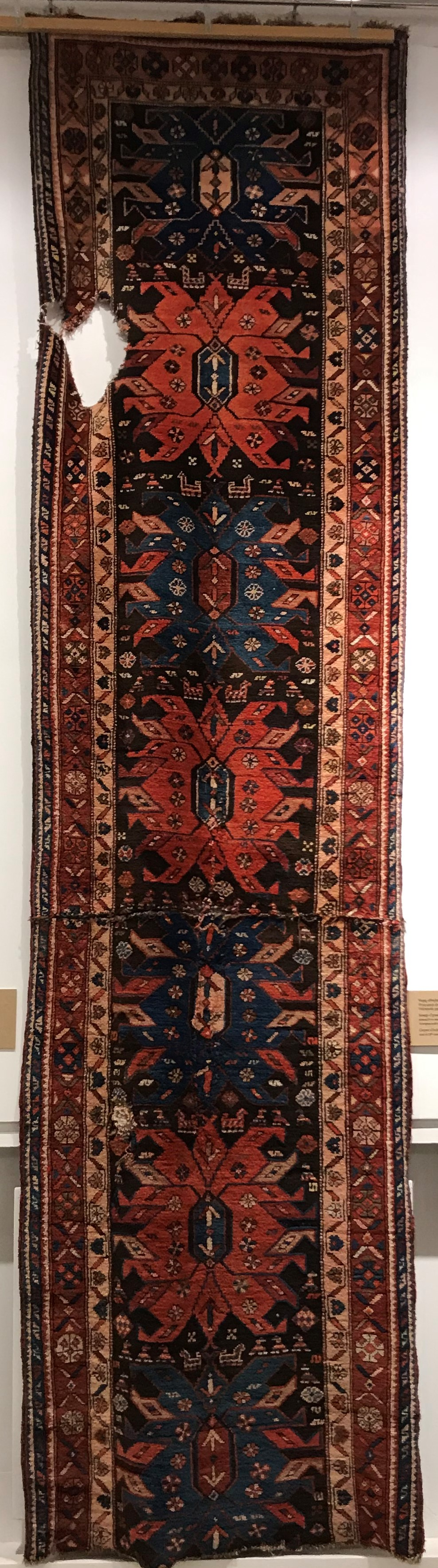
19th century Armenian carpet "Trchnabun"

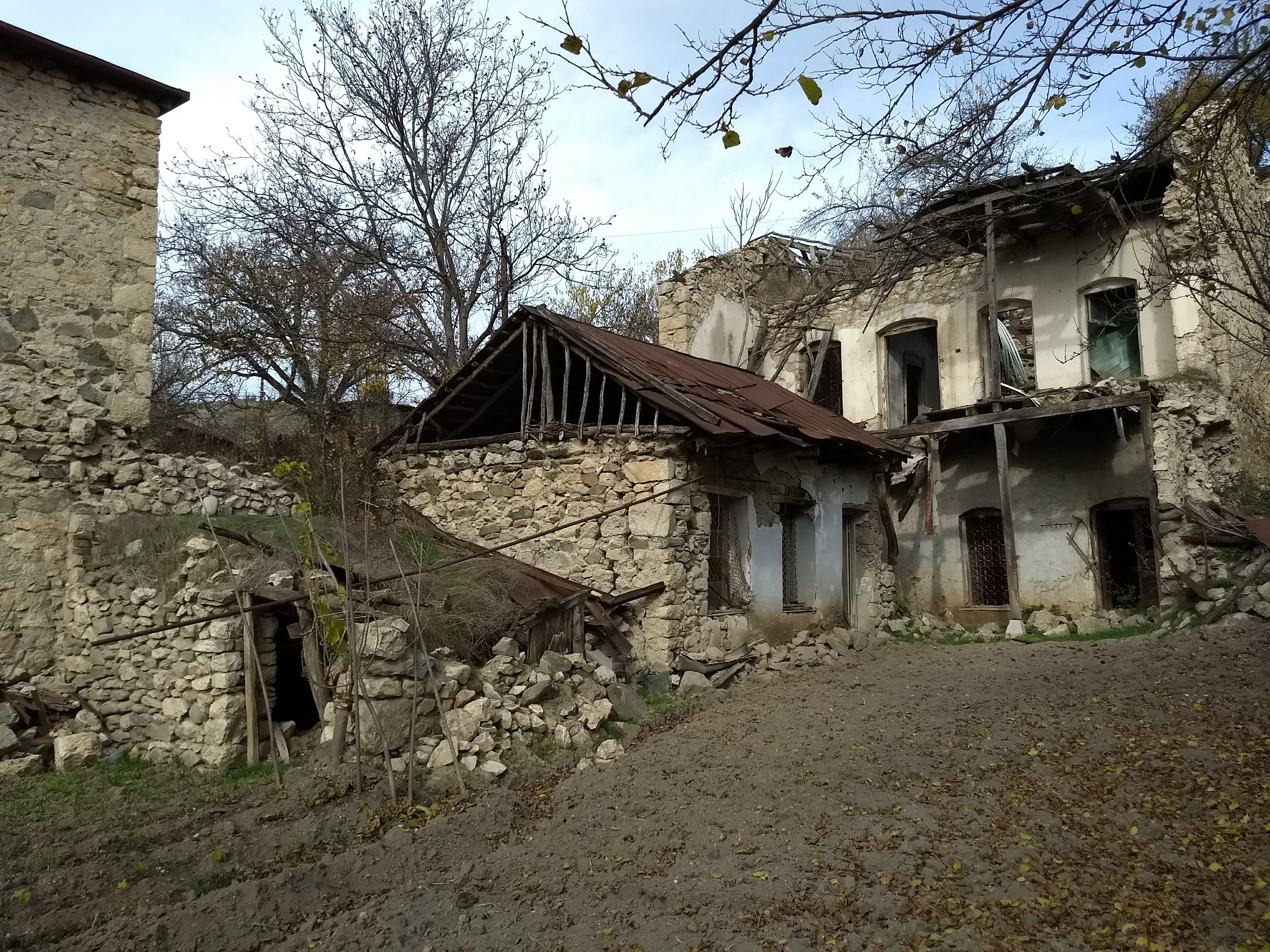
Old buildings

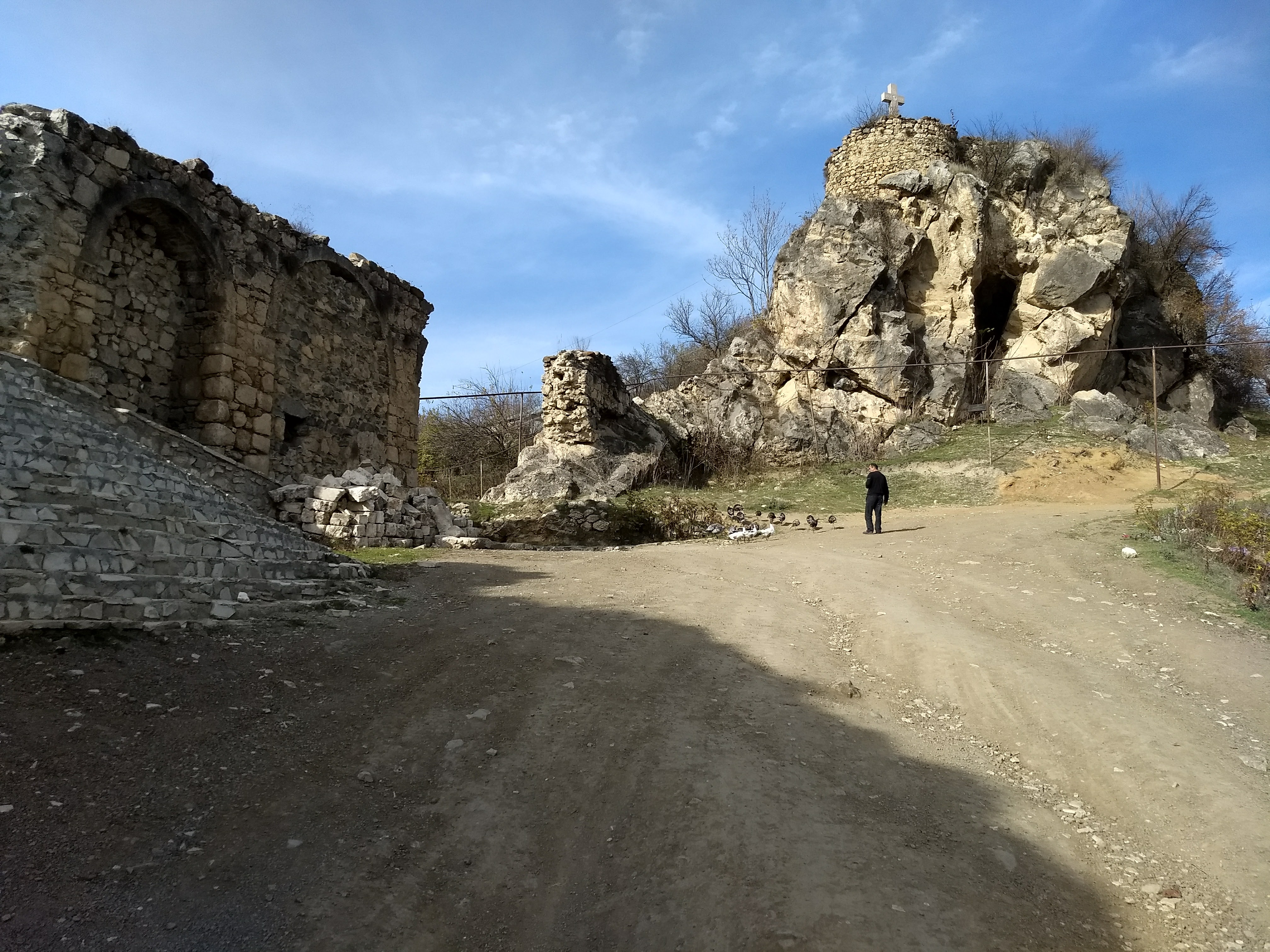
Fort

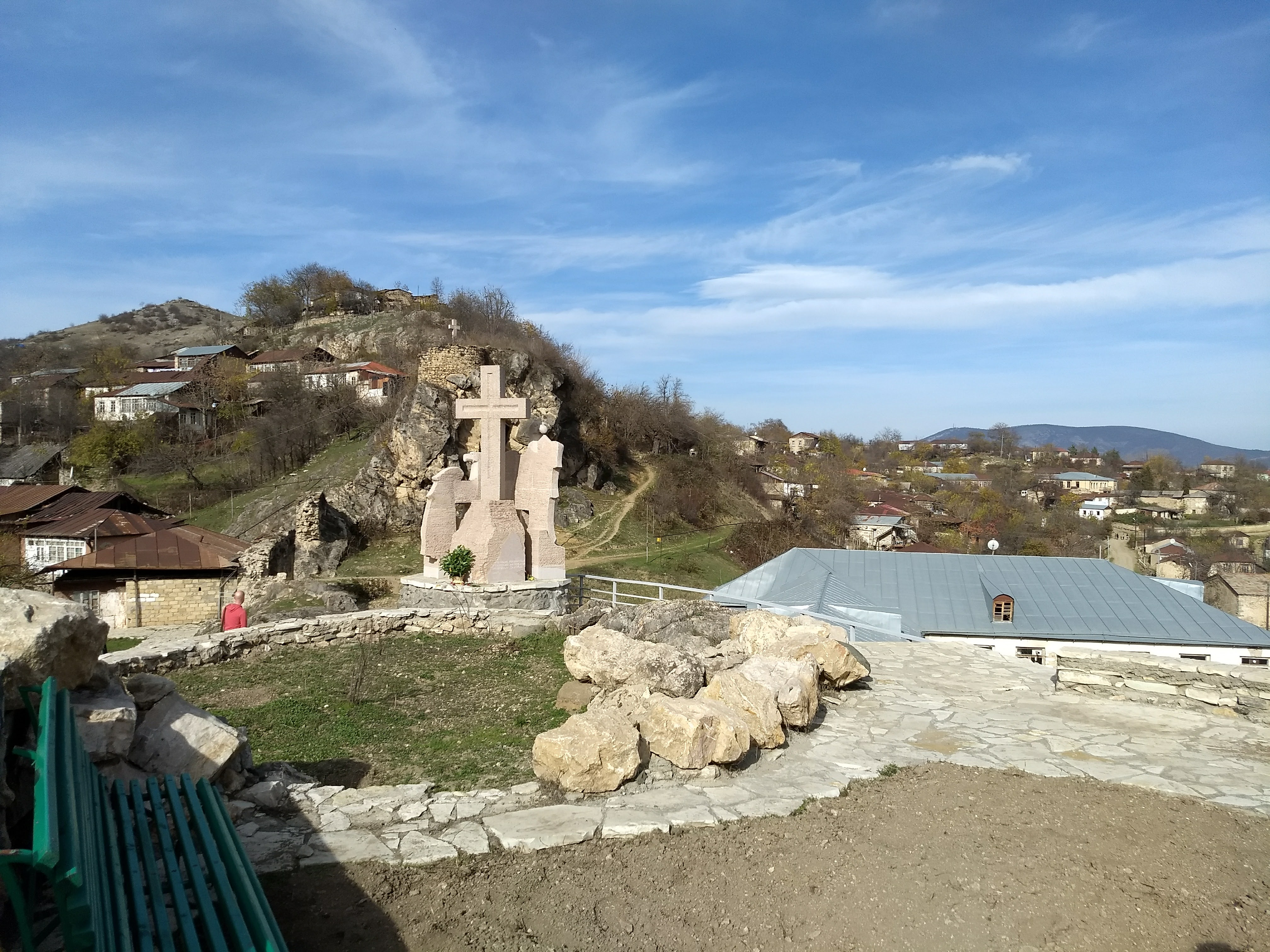
Armenian memorial

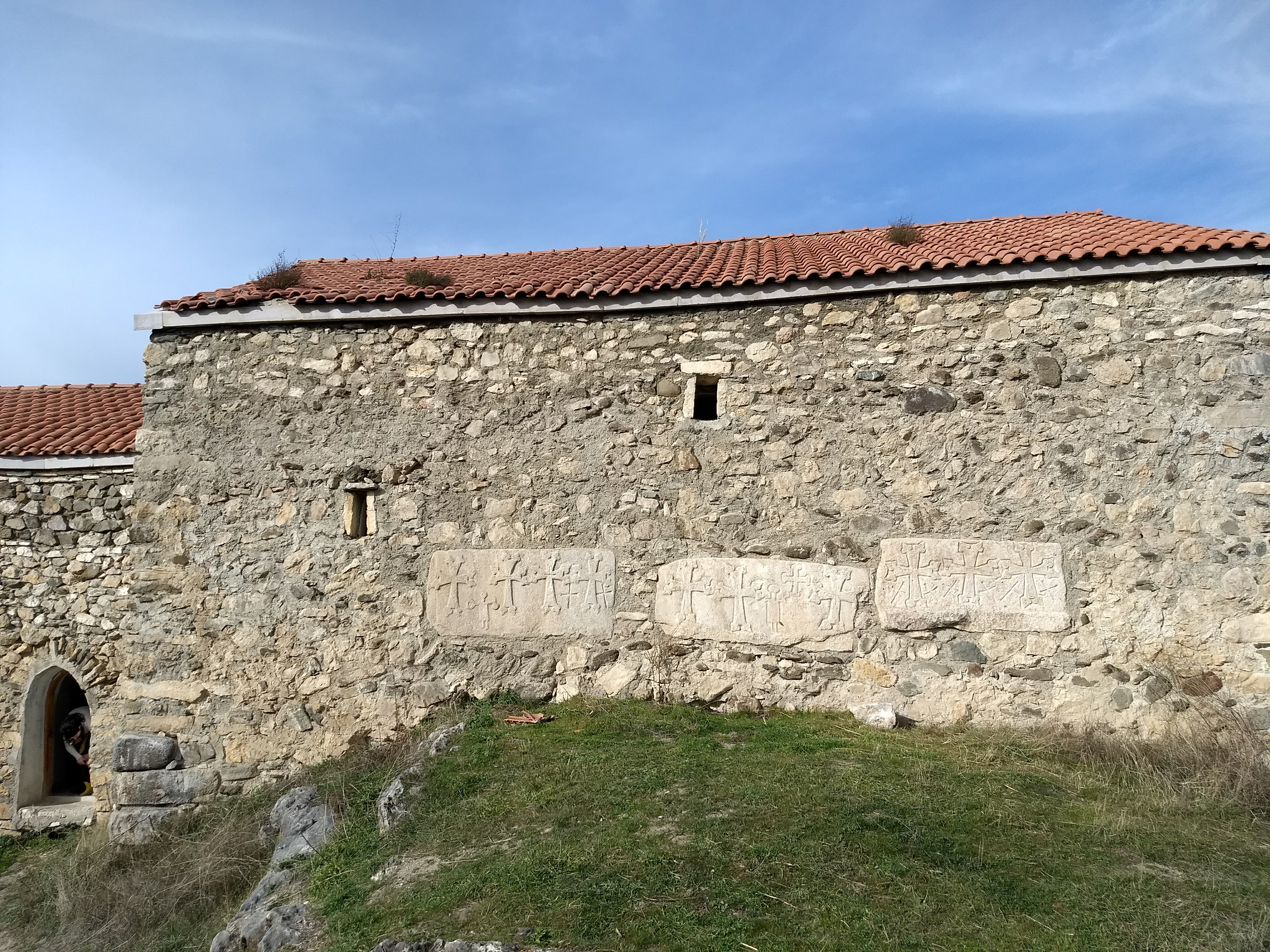
Kusanats Anapat Armenian Monastery

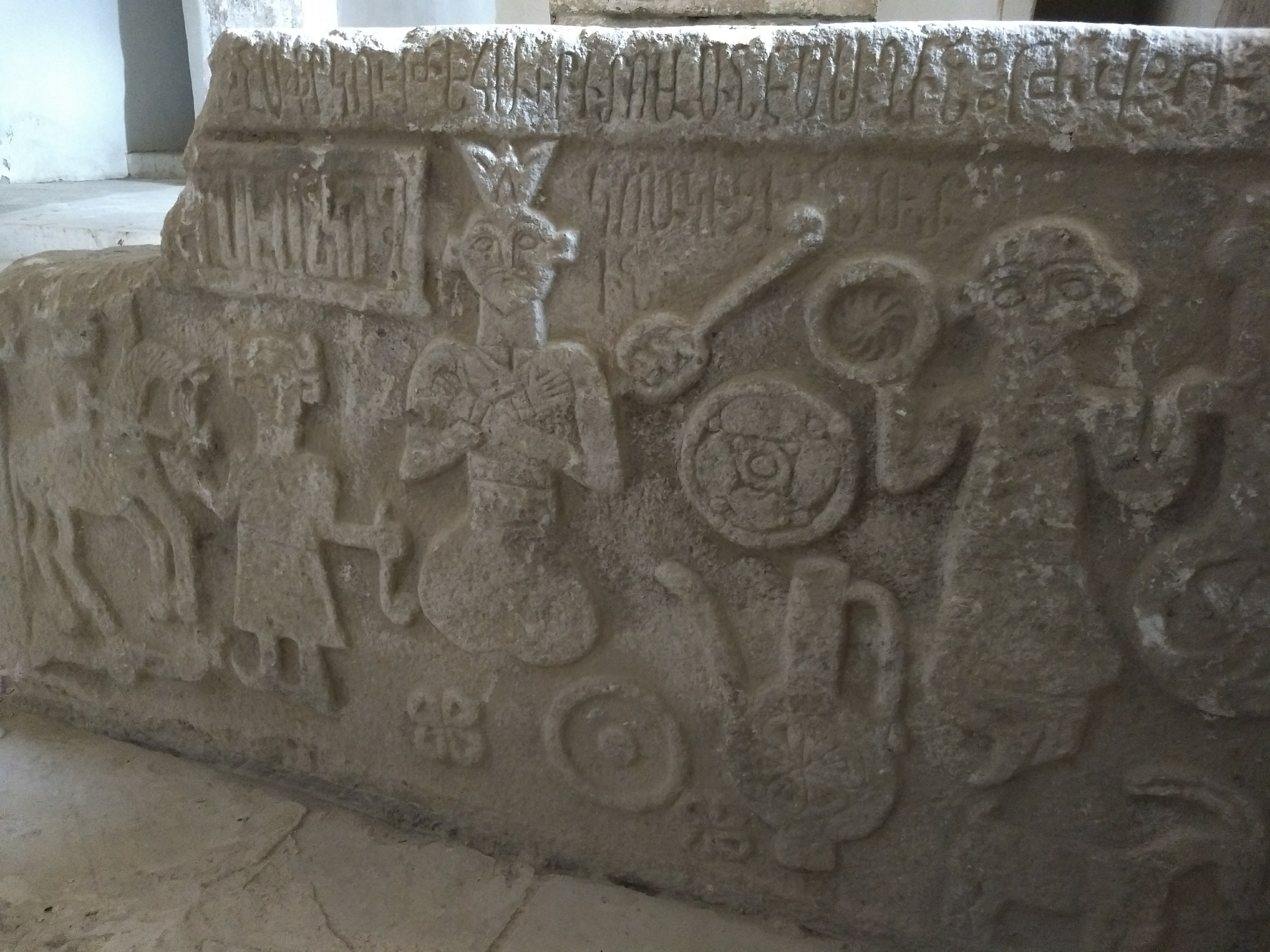
Kusanats Anapat Armenian Monastery

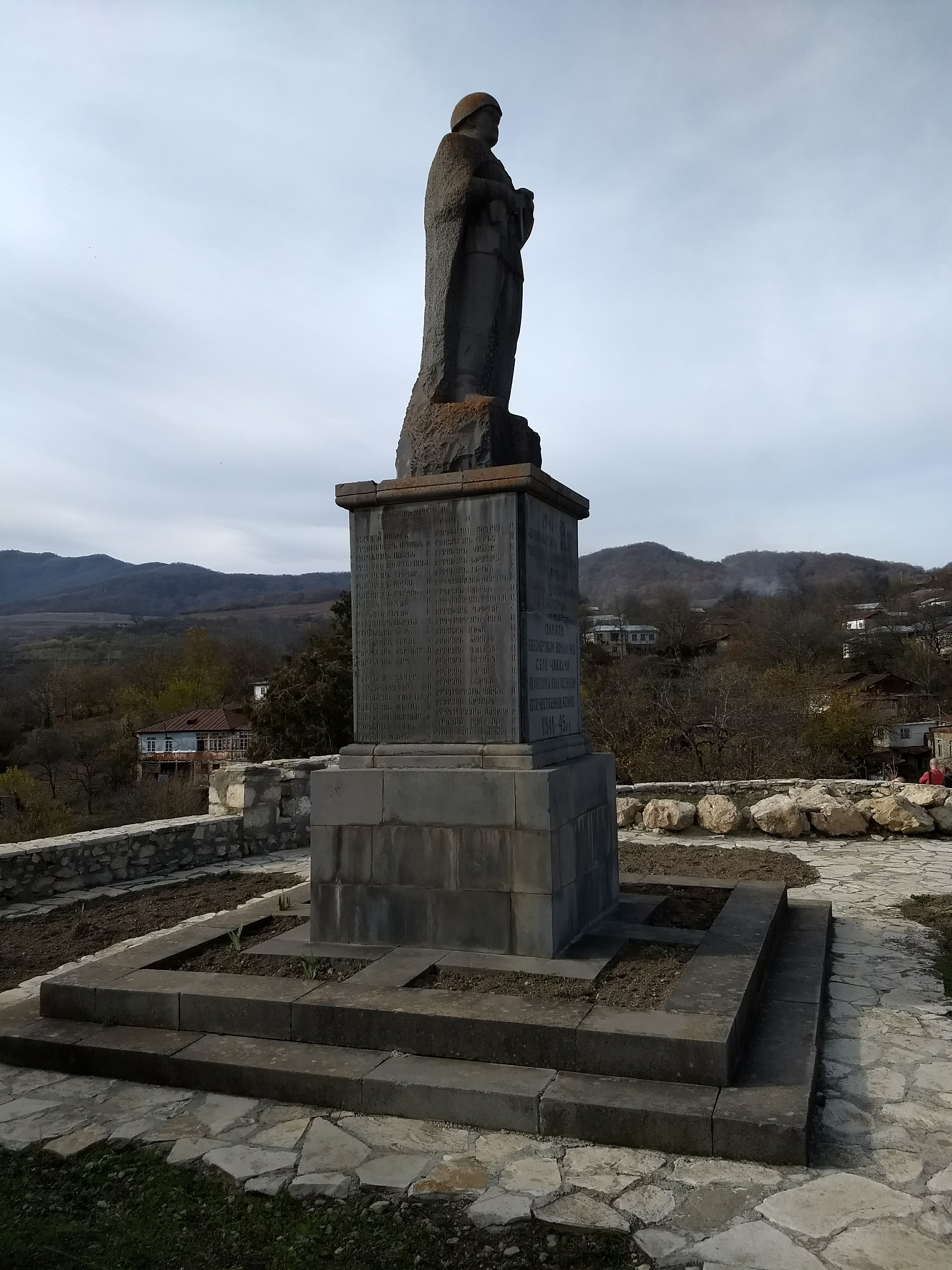
WWII Memorial

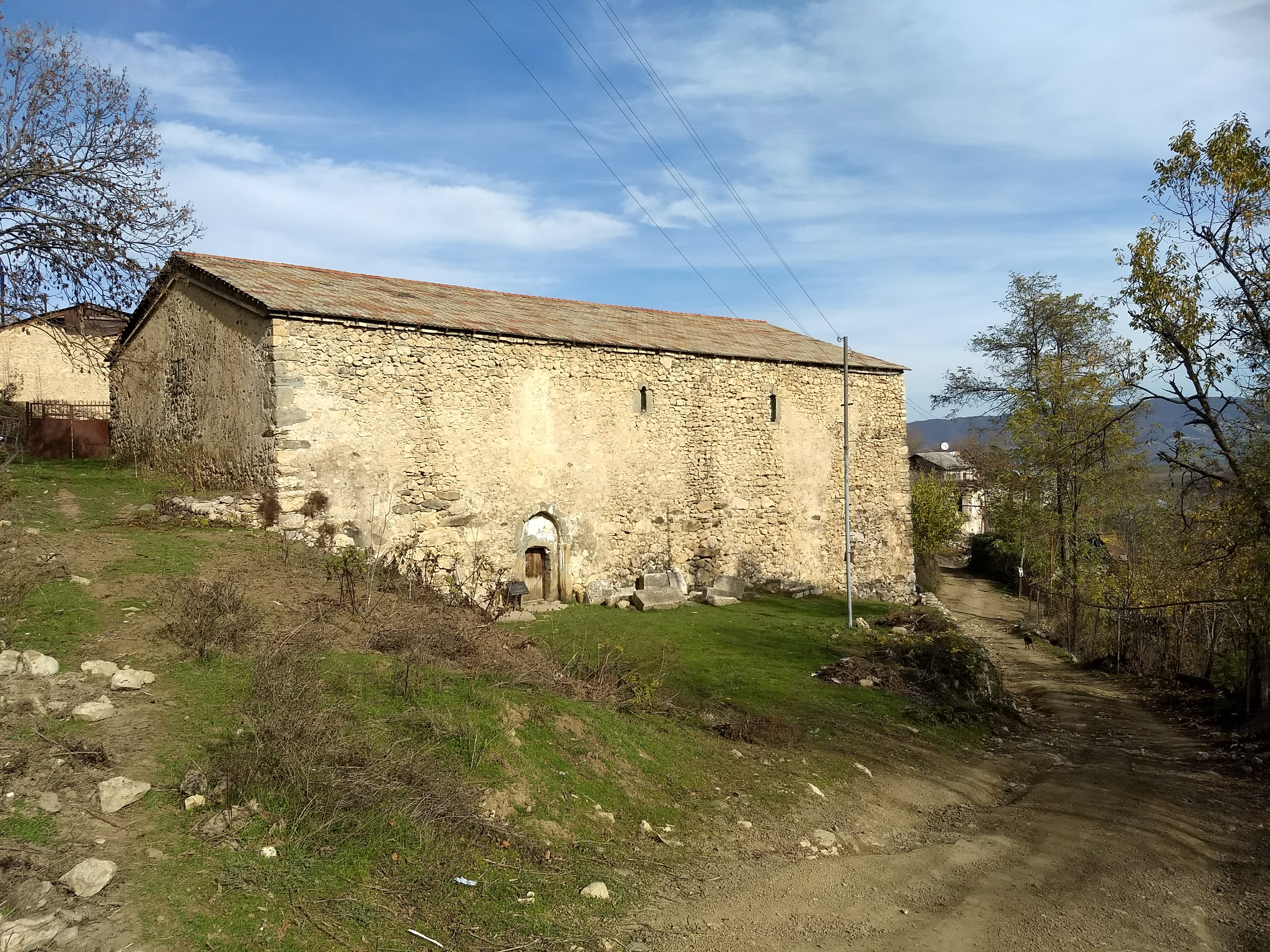
Surb Astvatsatsin Armenian Church of 1651
