= Hacıturalı =

- Municipality
- Location within Azerbaijan Location within Karabakh Economic Region
- Coordinates: 40°01′05″N 47°07′14″E
- Country: Azerbaijan
- Rayon: Agdam

Population
  - Total: 1,857
- Time zone: UTC+4 (AZT)
  - Summer (DST): UTC+5 (AZT)

Hacıturalı (Note: Transliterated as Hajituraly or Hajiturali) is a village and municipality in the Agdam District of Azerbaijan. It has a total population of 1,857.
