= Şahvəlilər =

Coordinates: 40°12′N 47°08′E

Şahvəlilər (also, Şahvəllər) is a village and municipality in the Barda Rayon of Azerbaijan. It has a population of 1,020.
