= Doşulu =

Doshulu
- Village
- Azerbaijani: Doşulu
- Location within Azerbaijan
- Coordinates: 39°28′36.6″N 47°04′51.8″E
- Country: Azerbaijan
- District: Jabrayil
- Time zone: UTC+4 (AZT)
  - Summer (DST): UTC+5 (AZT)

Doşulu (also, Doshulu) is a village in the Jabrayil District of Azerbaijan. Azerbaijan reportedly captured the village on October 15, 2020.
