= Qaramusalı =

- Municipality
- Location within Azerbaijan
- Coordinates: 40°43′46″N 46°45′04″E
- Country: Azerbaijan
- Rayon: Goranboy

Population
  - Total: 1,200
- Time zone: UTC+4 (AZT)
  - Summer (DST): UTC+5 (AZT)

Qaramusalı (also, Karamusaly) is a village and municipality in the Goranboy Rayon of Azerbaijan. It has a population of 1,200. The municipality consists of the villages of Qaramusalı and Həmənli.
