= Taghavard =

Taghavard Թաղավարդ
- Tağaverd
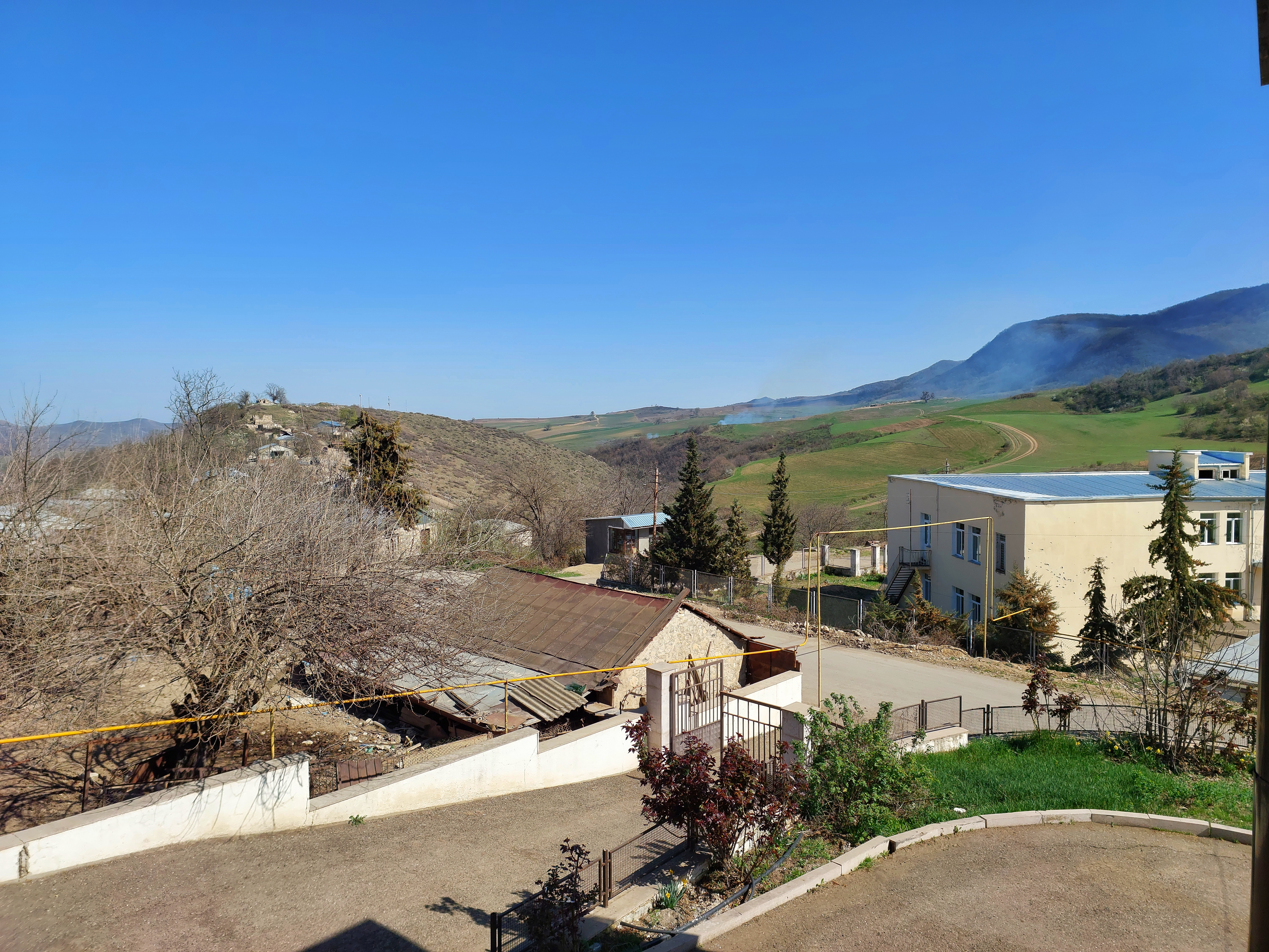

- Location within Azerbaijan
- Coordinates: 39°40′05.2″N 46°55′12.7″E
- Country: Azerbaijan
  - District: Khojavend

Population (2015)
  - Total: 1,301
- Time zone: UTC+4 (AZT)

Taghavard (Armenian: Թաղավարդ) or Taghaverd (Azerbaijani: Tağaverd) is a village in the disputed region of Nagorno-Karabakh. Until 2023 it was controlled by the breakaway Republic of Artsakh. The village had an ethnic Armenian-majority population until the expulsion of the Armenian population of Nagorno-Karabakh by Azerbaijan following the 2023 Azerbaijani offensive in Nagorno-Karabakh.

== Toponymy ==
The name Taghavard derives from two Armenian words, Tagh, meaning quarter (of a city), and Vard, meaning rose.

== History ==
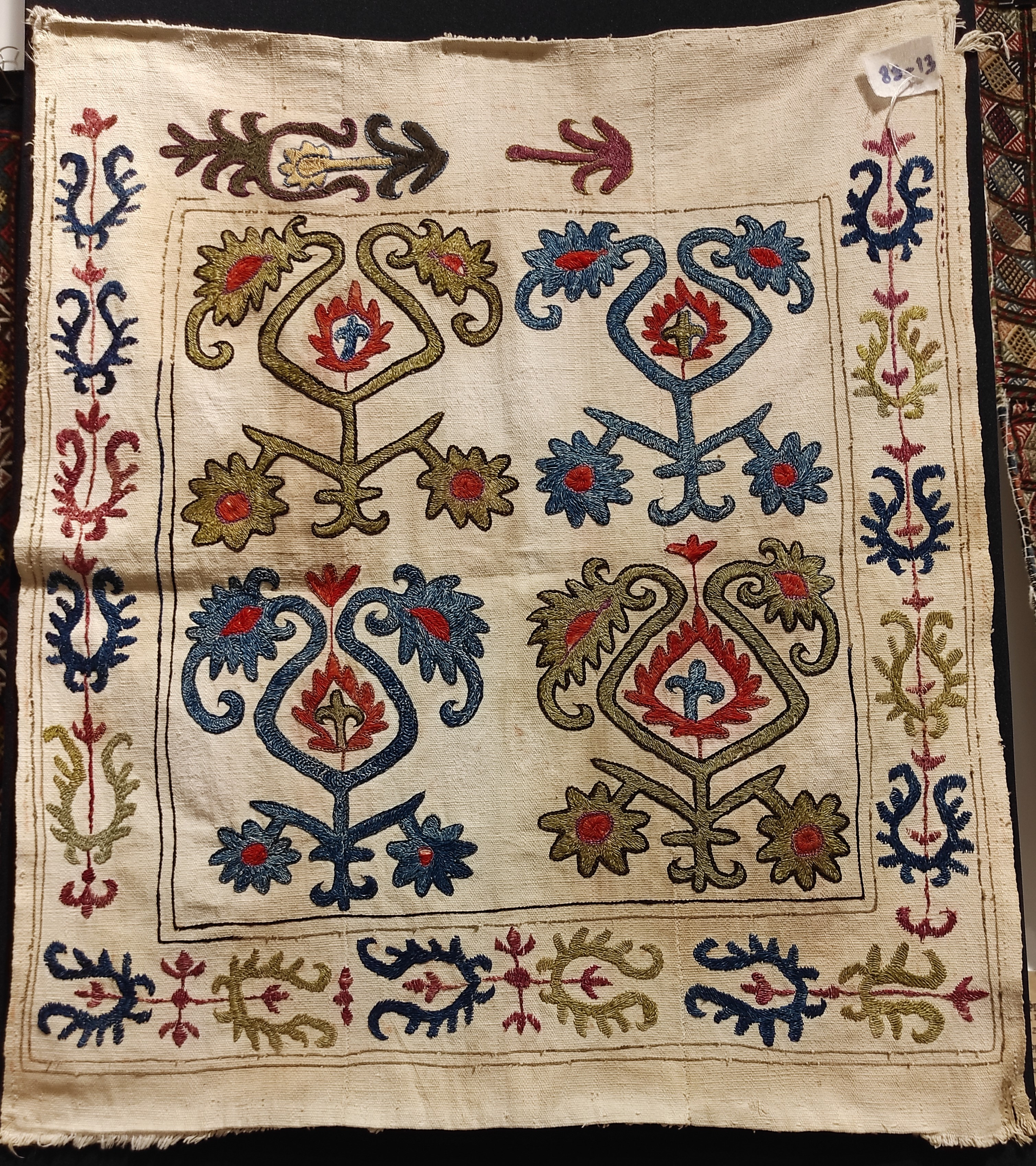
19th-century Kenats Tsar (Tree of Life) embroidery from Taghavard

During the Soviet period, the village was a part of the Martuni District of the Nagorno-Karabakh Autonomous Oblast.

Following the 2020 Nagorno-Karabakh war, the eastern, lower part of the village, Nerkin Taghavard (Armenian: Ներքին Թաղավարդ, also called Taghavard Kaler, Թաղավարդ Կալեր), continued to be controlled by the breakaway Republic of Artsakh as part of its Martuni Province, and the western, upper part of the village, Verin Taghavard (Armenian: Վերին Թաղավարդ), came under the control of Azerbaijan as part of its Khojavend District.

In the context of the 2023 Nagorno-Karabakh clashes, Artsakh MP Metakse Hakobyan stated that civilians in the village had been captured by the Azerbaijani Armed Forces.

== Historical heritage sites ==
Historical heritage sites in and around Taghavard include the 12th/13th-century monastery of Barevatsari Vank (also known as Jukht/Jokht Pravatsari Vank), the 17th-century Berdahonj Church, and the church of Surb Astvatsatsin (Armenian: Սուրբ Աստվածածին, lit. 'Holy Mother of God') built in 1840.

In July 2021, satellite images released by Caucasus Heritage Watch, a watchdog group made up of researchers from Purdue and Cornell, revealed that Azerbaijani bulldozers had cleared the western half of the village, thereby endangering the St. Astvatsatsin Church. It called on Azerbaijani authorities to prevent damage or destruction.

== Economy and culture ==
The population is mainly engaged in agriculture and animal husbandry. As of 2015, the village had a municipal building, a house of culture, two schools, a kindergarten, three shops, and a medical centre.

== Demographics ==
The village had 1,315 inhabitants in 2005, and 1,301 inhabitants in 2015.
