= Vagif =

Vagif (or Vaqif in the Azerbaijani transcription) is a common given name in Azerbaijan. Of Persian origin, it means "clever" or "watchful".

== Name ==
Notable people with the name include:

- Molla Panah Vagif (1717–1797), poet and statesman, founder of the "realist" school in Azerbaijani poetry
- Vagif Akhundov (born 1950), Azerbaijani general
- Vagif Aliyev (born 1953), Azerbaijani politician
- Vagif Bayatly Oner (born 1948), Azerbaijani poet and translator
- Vagif Behbudov (born 1938), Azerbaijani director and screenwriter
- Vagif Guliyev (born 1957), Azerbaijani mathematician
- Vagif Gurbanov (1967–1992), Soviet and Azerbaijani air force officer
- Vagif Huseynov (1942–2024), Azerbaijani army officer and politician
- Vagif Jafarov (1949–1991), Azerbaijani politician
- Vagif Javadov (born 1989), Azerbaijani footballer
- Vagif Mustafayev (born 1953), Azerbaijani screenwriter and actor
- Vagif Mustafazadeh (1940–1979), iconic jazz pianist, creator of fusion style with Azerbaijani mugham
- Vagif Rakhmanov (born 1940), Azerbaijani sculptor and graphic artist
- Vagif Rza Ibrahimov (born 1947), Azerbaijani scientist
- Vagif Sadigov (born 1956), Azerbaijani diplomat
- Vagif Sadygov (born 1959), Azerbaijani footballer and manager
- Vagif Samadoghlu (1939–2015), Azerbaijani poet and playwright
- Vagif Shirinov (born 1969), Russian footballer
- Vagif Sultanli (born 1958), Azerbaijani writer, critic and translator

== See also ==
- Vagif Jazz Festival
- Vagif Mausoleum in Shusha, Azerbaijan
- Vagif (play), play by Samad Vurgun
- Vagif Poetry Days, event in Azerbaijan
