= Qalacıq =

Qalacıq or Kaladzhik or Kaladzhyk or Kaladzhyh or Kaladzhykh may refer to:

- Qalacıq, Ismailli, Azerbaijan
- Qalacıq, Jabrayil, Azerbaijan
- Qalacıq, Qusar, Azerbaijan
