= Sughra Baghirzada =

Azerbaijani actress

Sughra Baghirzada Suğra Bağırzadə
- Born: Suğra Sadiq qızı Bağırzadə; 10 February 1947 (age 79); Baku, Azerbaijan SSR, USSR
- Occupations: actress, artist, florist
- Years active: 1959–present
- Awards
- Website: sugragallery.com

Sughra Sadiq gizi Baghirzada (Azerbaijani: Suğra Sadiq qızı Bağırzadə, born 10 February 1947) is an Azerbaijani actress, artist, and florist, Honored Artist of the Azerbaijan (2008), founder of the Public Union for Support of Art "Floristics".

== Biography ==
Sughra Baghirzada was born on 10 February 1947, in the city of Baku, Azerbaijan. Since her childhood, she has shown interest in arts. Her first success was the song "Jujalarim" (My Little Chicks), performed at the celebration of Azerbaijani culture festival in Moscow in 1959 on the stage of the Bolshoi Theatre. It was precisely in the performance of Sughra Baghirzada and the accompaniment of the Azerbaijan State Symphony Orchestra under the direction of maestro Niyazi that the song "Jujalarim" was included in the collection "The Best Children's Voices of the World".

At the age of 12, she was invited to the “Azerbaijanfilm” studio as a dubbing actress. While studying in 8th grade, she starred in the short film "Roads and Streets" directed by Zeynab Kazimova. In 1963, S. Baghirzada was invited to the leading role of Yeter in Agharza Guliyev's film "Ulduz", which became very popular in the mid-60s.

After graduating from the Engineering and Technology Department of the Azerbaijan Oil Academy in 1970, she returned to the “Azerbaijanfilm” as an engineer, while continuing her career as an actress.

Sughra Baghirzada is a member of the Union of Artists of Azerbaijan, the Union of Cinematographers of Azerbaijan and the Confederation of Cinematographers of the CIS and the Baltic States.

Since 2004, Sughra Baghirzada has also been a member of the World Flower Council. This council includes 27 countries. She is the first and only representative of not only Azerbaijan, but also of the entire Turkic-speaking world in this council. She has over 200 works, which she has exhibited in Latvia, Russia, France, Malaysia, New Zealand, UK, Croatia, Japan and China.

Sughra Baghirzada is the author of the book "Floristry", which is the first book published in the Azerbaijani language about the floral design, classical and modern trends of floristry.

== Honours and awards ==
- Honored Artist of Azerbaijan (2008) – awarded by the Decree of the President of the Republic of Azerbaijan No. 2960 dated August 1, 2008.
- "Honorary Doctor” (2015), "International Golden Star" Medal (2015), "Cultural Figure of the Year in the Turkic World" (2015) – awarded by the Turkish World Studies International Academy of Sciences for contribution to Turkic World culture and the development of Azerbaijani–Turkish relations.
- "Founder of a New Professional Direction in the Floral Industry" diploma (2016) – awarded by the World Flower Council, further highlighting the uniqueness of artworks and the innovative technologies used in their creation.
- "Certificate of Honor" diploma (2016) for participation in the International Exhibition of Florist Designers in St. Petersburg.
- "A tribute to a Friend of Peterhof" diploma (2016) for the originality of the presented collection – dedicated to the 300th anniversary of Peterhof.
- "Duty and Honor"award (2016), "Benefit, Honor, and Glory" award (2016) – awarded by the United Nations Council on Public Awards (UNCOPA).
- Taraggi (Progress) Medal – awarded on August 1, 2018, by Order No. 376 of the President of the Republic of Azerbaijan.
- "Ambassador of Culture and Peace" (2018) – awarded by the United Nations Council on Public Awards (UNCOPA) for services in the world culture.
- "Leonardo da Vinci" Medal (2021) – awarded by the United Nations Council on Public Awards (UNCOPA) for outstanding contributions to world culture.

== Filmography ==
- "Roads and Streets" ("Azerbaijanfilm", 1961)
- "Ulduz" ("Azerbaijanfilm", 1963).
- "A Man Is Born" ("Azerbaijanfilm", 1974)
- "Wonderful Apples" ("Azerbaijanfilm", 1976).
- "Today, Tomorrow and..." (Russia, 1977).
- "The Lion Left Home" 2 series ("Azerbaijanfilm", 1977).
- "Trap" ("Azerbaijanfilm", 1993).
- "My Chickens" (AzTV, 1995).
- "Dream" ("Azerbaijanfilm", 2001).
- “Execution is Canceled” (“Azerbaijanfilm”, 2003).
- "The Last Witness" 4 series (AzTV, 2004).
- "Black Market" (Studio M&M, 2010).
- "Sharper than a Sword." (dir. A. Muradov, 2011).
- "13th Department" (in association with the TV channel "Mir", 2014).
- “Life, How Odd You Are” (TV “Khazar”, 2015–16).
- "The Train Called Time". (dir. K. Musayev, 2016)
- "Swing over the Caspian" (dir. G. Askerov, 2019)
- "Letter of Honor" (dir. R. Huseynov, 2021)
- "Spicy Dish (series, Russia, 2023)
