= Vagif Sultanli =

Vagif Sultanli Vaqif Sultanlı
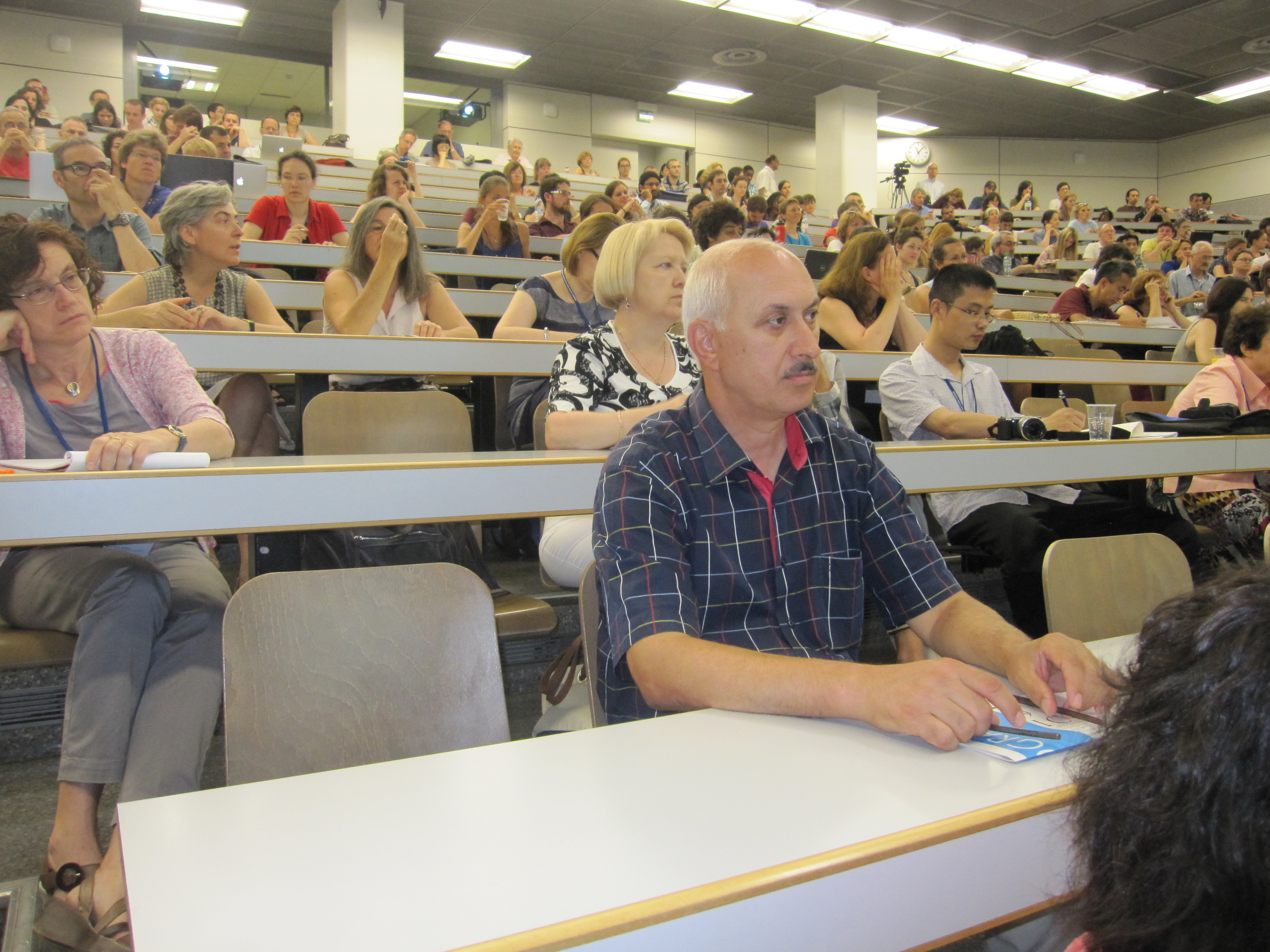
- Born: Vaqif Soltan oğlu Verdiyev; 26 March 1958 (age 67); Shakhsevan, Kurdamir Azerbaijan SSR, USSR
- Citizenship: USSR→ Azerbaijan
- Education: Azerbaijan State University
- Scientific career
- Fields: Literature

Vagif Soltan oglu Verdiyev (Azerbaijani: Vaqif Soltan oğlu Verdiyev; born March 26, 1958), also known as Vagif Sultanli, is an Azerbaijani literary writer, critic, translator, member of Union of Azerbaijani Writers, doctor of philological sciences (1997), and professor (1999).

== Biography ==
Vagif Sultanli was born on March 26, 1958, in the village of Shakhsevan in Kurdamir.

He graduated from the village school of Kohnabazar in 1974. During his studies in high school, he also studied at the Kurdamir District Music School from 1970 to 1975. In 1974–1976 he worked at the electricity network of the Kurdamir region. He graduated from the Faculty of Philology of the Azerbaijan State University with honors in 1981.

He began his career as a language and literature teacher in the village of Kaladzhyk, Ismayilli. Then he continued his postgraduate studies at the Department of Contemporary Azerbaijan Literature at Azerbaijan State University.

In 1984 he defended his thesis on "The Problem of Character in Azerbaijani Drama (1970–1980)". He worked as a teacher, senior lecturer, and associate professor at Baku State University from 1984 to 1991. From 1999 he has worked at the Department of History of Azerbaijani Literature of the university. He defended his doctoral thesis on "The Life and Literary Activity of Mahammad Amin Rasulzade" in 1997. He has been consistently engaged in public activities. He founded the World Association of Azerbaijani Studies and was elected its chairman in 1991.

In 1995–1998, Vagif Sultanli worked as a correspondent for literary broadcasts in the Azerbaijani editorial office of American radio stations Radio Free Europe/Radio Liberty (RFE/RL). He was the editor-in-chief of publications published in Poland ("Khudaferin" - 1995), Sweden ("Araz" - 1996–1997), and the United States ("World Azerbaijanis" - 2000–2012).

Vagif Sultanli is the head of the Caucasus Bureau of the Cyprus-Balkans-Eurasia Turkish Literature Organization (Turkey). He was awarded the H. Zardabi Award (1995), the International Turkish Language Service Award of the Cyprus-Balkans and Eurasia Turkish Literature Organization (KIBATEK) (2003) and the Honorary Decree of the Ministry of Culture of Egypt (2014).

He was elected a board member of the World Azerbaijanis Congress (WAC) at the conventions held in Sweden (2001), the Netherlands (2002), Germany (2004), Belgium (2008) and the United Kingdom (2010). He is a member of the International Society for Epic Studies.

In 2018, he was elected a member of the International Writers Association, based in the United States.

He is married and has two children.

== Literary creation ==
He started literary activity at a young age but did not see his first work published until 1980, when his story "The fragrance of wormwood" was published in the magazine Azerbaijani Woman. Since that time he has regularly published his own stories, translations, and essays in mass media.

In the narrative titled “The Dream of Death” (1982), deemed as one of the author’s notable works, the transfer of cemetery is described as a serious chaos and anxiety in the social life. This chaos allows us to discover the internal spiritual world of the described characters. In this narrative ending with suicide by the bulldozer driver having destroyed the cemetery, the author pursues an object of identifying the contradiction of the spiritual and mortal values with death.

The novel titled “The Human Sea” (1992) written in conjunction with the real and conditional-metaphoric styles, has a special place in the author’s literary creation. In this novel, the events of which happen in the 80s of the last century, the hero being rescued from the punishment of death and secretly living in alien city describes the issue of alienation being absorbed into the spirituality and morality of the society.

The events described in the novel titled “Struggle in the Desert” (2010) differing with specific narrative style, are expressed on the background of the destiny of the hero, who, due to the time’s breaking up rejects the future and comes towards the past. Development of the events on this platitude allows the author to express own philosophic thoughts regarding the human being and the world. The novel “Struggle in desert” differs in spirit of protest against the issues of alienation, oblivion, negligence and unnecessity ruling all over the world.

“The white way”, “The morning mist”, “The green song of leafless branches”, “The wanderer”, “The cave”, “Polar night”, “The Motherland”, “The Island”, “Mirage”, “Reverse flow”, “The silent ring”, “The ash cage”, “The striped burrow”, “The cross shadow”, “The clay mistery” and other stories by Vagif Sultanly differ with specific style and linguistic features. Historical stories like “The place of meeting”, “Navai-Gumru”, “Humayun”, etc. also belong to the author’s pen. He is also the author of many miniatures written in lyric-romantic style.

== Scientific creation ==
Besides the literary creation, the author also deals with the theoretical-esthetical issues of art. His researches connected with the literary critics and literary science are expressed in his books titled “Mammad Amin Rasulzade’s literary world” (1993), “The traveler of a hard way” (1996), “The horizons of freedom” (1997), “Azerbaijani Emigration Literature” (1998), “The literary-theoretical illustrations” (2000), “The shore of survival” (2004), “The issues of studying the literary critics” (2007), “Literary criticism of Azerbaijan” (2012), “Love to Independence” (2014), “Literary criticism of Azerbaijan” (2019), etc. The investigations connected to the Azerbaijani emigrational literature have a special place in the author’s activity of literary activity. Vagif Sultanly is the author of numerous journalistic works and scientific articles connected to critics and literary process. His reports read in international conferences, workshops, forums and seminars are deemed as an important part of his scientific creation.

== Translation activity ==
Vagif Sultanly also deals with translation activity. He has translated into the Azerbaijani language and published the novels “The Leaf Fall” and “The Mill” by Reşat Nuri Güntekin and the historical narrative “The Syracusian Scientist” by Sergey Jitomirsky, as well as the stories by Erwin Strittmatter, Jaroslav Hasek, Veijo Meri, Gustav Stopka, etc. He has translated from Russian (jointly) the work titled “About Panturanism” by Mammad Amin Rasulzade.

== The books ==
- The stars out (narrative and stories) - 1988
- The Human Sea (novel) - 1992
- Mammad Amin Rasulzade’s literary world (educational manual) - 1993
- The traveler of hard way (monograph) - 1996
- The horizons of freedom (collection of articles) -1997
- Azerbaijani Emigration Literature (educational manual) - 1998
- Slave market (stories, miniatures, essays) - 1999
- Literary-theoretical illustrations (theoretical fragments) - 2000
- The Dream of Death (novel, stories and essays) -2002
- The shore of survival (dialogue-monograph) - 2004
- The issues of studying of literary critics (educational manual) – 2007
- Literary criticism of Azerbaijan (educational manual) - 2009
- The valley of unnecessity (novel and stories) - 2010
- Literary criticism of Azerbaijan – Improved 2nd publication (educational manual) - 2012
- Love to Independence (monograph) - 2014
- Struggle in the Desert (novel) - 2015
- Literary criticism of Azerbaijan – Improved 2nd publication (educational manual) – 2019

== The works published in the English language ==
- The Human Sea (novel). Edited by Michael Brannock, Liverpool, Rossendale Books, 2012, 204 p.
- The Human Sea (novel). Bloomington, Trafford Publishing, 2012, 240 p.
- The Dream of Death (novel and short stories). Edited by Michael Brannock, London, Rossendale Books, 2013, 162 p.
- Reverse flow (novel and short stories). Edited by Michael Brannock, London, Rossendale Books, 2014, 182 p.
- The Dream of Death (novel and short stories). Edited by Annemarie Sjold, Helsinge, Whyte Tracks Publishing, 2014, 136 p.
- The Legend of the Snake (A novel and collection of short stories). Edited by Michael Brannock, London, Rossendale Books, 2015, 308 p.
- The Dream of Death (novel and short stories). II Edition, Edited by Annemarie Sjold and Tamara Dragadze, Helsinge, Whyte Tracks Publishing, 2015, 136 p.
- A Blind Tie. Selected Works, Raleigh, Rossendale Books, 2017, 400 p.
- Struggle in the Desert. (novel), London, Rossendale Books, 2019, 196 p.
- The Battle of Kulikovo (A novel and short stories). Edited by Michael Brannock, London: Rossendale Books, 2023, 276 p.
- The Human Sea & The Dream of Death (two novels). Edited by Michael Brannock, London: Rossendale Books, 2023, 337 p.
