= Jujalarim =

Azerbaijani children's song

"Jujalarim (My Little Chickens)"

Song
- Language: Azerbaijani
- Released: Sung for the first time in May 1959
- Genre: Children's Music
- Length: 2:48
- Composer: Gambar Huseynli
- Lyricist: Tofig Mutallibov

The "Jujalarim" (Azerbaijani: Cücələrim, Cyrillic: Ҹүҹәләрим, Russian: Мои цыплята — my little chicks) is an Azerbaijani song composed by for children by Gambar Huseynli and Tofig Mutallibov. It was sung for the first time by Sughra Baghirzada in May 1959 at the Festival of the Decade of Azerbaijani Art in Moscow. Its music was composed by Ganbar Huseinli in 1949 and the lyrics were by Tofig Mutallibov.

It is about a mother chicken who takes good care of her little chicks, making sure that they get enough food and water. The song gained popularity amongst children in the USSR and far beyond its borders. It also appeared in episode 6, "Countryside" (1973), of the Nu, pogodi!.

The song was translated into many languages such as Russian, English, German, Japanese, Bulgarian, Polish, Serbo-Croatian and Romanian.

== Text ==
Azerbaijani

Cip-cip cücələrim,
Cip-cip, cip-cip cücələrim,
Mənim qəşəng cücələrim,
Tükü ipək cücələrim.

Gözləyirəm, tez gələsiz
Göy çəməndə dincələsiz.
Gözləyirəm, tez gələsiz
Göy çəməndə dincələsiz.

Ay mənim — cücələrim
Ay mənim — cücələrim
Ay mənim — cücələrim
Ay mənim — cücələrim

Mənim göyçək cücələrim.
Cip-cip cücələrim,
Cip-cip, cip-cip cücələrim,
Mənim qəşəng cücələrim,
Tükü ipək cücələrim.

Gəlin sizə yemək verim,
Mən su verim, çörək verim.
Gəlin sizə yemək verim,
Mən su verim, çörək verim.

Ay mənim – cücələrim
Ay mənim – cücələrim
Ay mənim – cücələrim
Ay mənim – cücələrim

Mənim göyçək cücələrim.
Cip-cip cücələrim,
Cip-cip, cip-cip cücələrim,
Mənim qəşəng cücələrim,
Tükü ipək cücələrim.

Arzum budur, boy atasız,
Ananıza tez çatasız.
Arzum budur, boy atasız,
Ananıza tez çatasız.

Ay mənim – cücələrim
Ay mənim – cücələrim
Ay mənim – cücələrim
Ay mənim – cücələrim

Mənim göyçək cücələrim.
Cip-cip cücələrim,
Cip-cip, cip-cip cücələrim,
Mənim qəşəng cücələrim,
Tükü ipək cücələrim.

Cip, cip, cip.

Azerbaijani (Cyrillic)

Ҹип-ҹип ҹүҹәләрим,
Ҹип-ҹип, ҹип-ҹип ҹүҹәләрим,
Мәним гәшәнҝ ҹүҹәләрим,
Түкү ипәк ҹүҹәләрим.

Ҝөзләјирәм, тез ҝәләсиз
Ҝөј чәмәндә динҹәләсиз.
Ҝөзләјирәм, тез ҝәләсиз
Ҝөј чәмәндә динҹәләсиз.

Ај мәним — ҹүҹәләрим
Ај мәним — ҹүҹәләрим
Ај мәним — ҹүҹәләрим
Ај мәним — ҹүҹәләрим

Мәним ҝөјчәк ҹүҹәләрим.
Ҹип-ҹип ҹүҹәләрим,
Ҹип-ҹип, ҹип-ҹип ҹүҹәләрим,
Мәним гәшәнҝ ҹүҹәләрим,
Түкү ипәк ҹүҹәләрим.

Ҝәлин сизә јемәк верим,
Мән су верим, чөрәк верим.
Ҝәлин сизә јемәк верим,
Мән су верим, чөрәк верим.

Ај мәним — ҹүҹәләрим
Ај мәним — ҹүҹәләрим
Ај мәним — ҹүҹәләрим
Ај мәним — ҹүҹәләрим

Мәним ҝөјчәк ҹүҹәләрим.
Ҹип-ҹип ҹүҹәләрим,
Ҹип-ҹип, ҹип-ҹип ҹүҹәләрим,
Мәним гәшәнҝ ҹүҹәләрим,
Түкү ипәк ҹүҹәләрим.

Арзум будур, бој атасыз,
Ананыза тез чатасыз.
Арзум будур, бој атасыз,
Ананыза тез чатасыз.

Ај мәним – ҹүҹәләрим
Ај мәним – ҹүҹәләрим
Ај мәним – ҹүҹәләрим
Ај мәним – ҹүҹәләрим

Мәним ҝөјчәк ҹүҹәләрим.
Ҹип-ҹип ҹүҹәләрим,
Ҹип-ҹип, ҹип-ҹип ҹүҹәләрим,
Мәним гәшәнҝ ҹүҹәләрим,
Түкү ипәк ҹүҹәләрим.

Ҹип, ҹип, ҹип.

English translation

Chirp chirp my chicks
Chirp, chirp, chirp my chicks
My lovely chicks,
With feathers of silk.

I wait for you, come quick
Rest yourselves on green grass.
I wait for you, come quick
Rest yourselves on green grass.

Oh my – my chicks
Oh my – my chicks
Oh my – my chicks
Oh my – my chicks

My pretty chicks.
Chirp chirp my chicks,
Chirp chirp, chirp chirp my chicks,
My lovely chicks,
With feathers of silk.

Come, I will give you food,
I will give you water, bread.
Come, I will give you food,
I will give you water, bread.

Oh my – my chicks
Oh my – my chicks
Oh my – my chicks
Oh my – my chicks

My pretty chicks.
Chirp chirp my chicks,
Chirp chirp, chirp chirp my chicks,
My lovely chicks,
With feathers of silk.

My wish is that you grow up,
You soon catch with your mother.
My wish is that you grow up,
You soon catch with your mother.

Oh my - my chicks
Oh my - my chicks
Oh my - my chicks
Oh my - my chicks

My pretty chicks.
Chirp chirp my chicks,
Chirp chirp, chirp chirp my chicks,
My lovely chicks,
With feathers of silk.

Chirp, chirp, chirp.

Russian lyrics

Цып-цып, мои цыплятки,
Цып-цып-цып, мои касатки,
Вы пушистые комочки,
Мои будущие квочки.

Я вас жду – скорей придите,
На зелёном лугу отдохните.
Я вас жду – скорей придите,
На зелёном лугу отдохните.

Ой, мои – цыплятки!
Ой, мои – касатки!
Ой, мои – цыплятки!
Ой, мои – касатки!

Вы, пушистые комочки.
Цып-цып, мои цыплятки,
Цып-цып-цып, мои касатки,
Вы пушистые комочки,
Мои будущие квочки.

Подойдите вы напиться,
Дам вам зерен и водицы.
Подойдите вы напиться,
Дам вам зерен и водицы.

Ой, мои – цыплятки!
Ой, мои – касатки!
Ой, мои – цыплятки!
Ой, мои – касатки!

Вы, пушистые комочки.
Цып-цып, мои цыплятки,
Цып-цып-цып, мои касатки,
Вы пушистые комочки,
Мои будущие квочки.

Я желаю – подрастайте,
К маме вашей поспешайте.
Я желаю – подрастайте,
К маме вашей поспешайте.

Ой, мои – цыплятки!
Ой, мои – касатки!
Ой, мои – цыплятки!
Ой, мои – касатки!

Вы, пушистые комочки.
Цып-цып, мои цыплятки,
Цып-цып-цып, мои касатки,
Вы пушистые комочки,
Мои будущие квочки.

Цып, цып, цып.
