= Vagif Behbudov =

Azerbaijani film director and screenwriter

Vagif Behbudov Vaqif Behbudov
- Born: November 3, 1938 (age 87); Baku, Azerbaijan SSR, USSR
- Education: St. Petersburg State University of Film and Television
- Occupation: film director
- Awards: State Prize of the Azerbaijan SSR

Vagif Gulam oghlu Behbudov (Azerbaijani: Vaqif Qulam oğlu Behbudov, born November 3, 1938) is an Azerbaijani film director, screenwriter, People's Artiste of Azerbaijan (2000).

== Biography ==
Vagif Behbudov was born on November 3, 1938, in Baku. Vagif Behbudov graduated from St. Petersburg State University of Film and Television in 1961. He laid the foundation for the production of cartoons on Azerbaijan Television. At first he worked as a cameraman, and then as a film director.

Six of the animated films he authored were awarded prizes and awards at the International Television Film Festival. He is the head of the group of cameramen in the "Azerbaijantelefilm" Creative Union, the secretary of The Union of Cinematographers of Azerbaijan.

== Awards ==
- People's Artiste of Azerbaijan — December 18, 2000
- State Prize of the Azerbaijan SSR
- Honorary Diploma of President — November 2, 2018
- Humay Award
