= Qalacıq, Jabrayil =

Qalacıq
- Location within Azerbaijan
- Coordinates: 39°23′59″N 46°54′18″E
- Country: Azerbaijan
- District: Jabrayil
- Time zone: UTC+4 (AZT)
  - Summer (DST): UTC+5 (AZT)

Qalacıq (Galajyg) is a village in the Jabrayil District of Azerbaijan.
