= Vagif Jazz Festival =

Vagif Jazz Festival – traditional jazz festival dedicated to the 75th anniversary of Vagif Mustafazadeh, composer, pianist, the founder of jazz-mugham style in Azerbaijan.

The Vagif jazz festival was held on March 16, 2015, in Icheri Sheher Kichik Gala Street.

The two-part festival was started at 11:00 by visiting Vagif Mustafazadeh's grave.

After that, the festival guests and media representatives continued to celebrate Memorial Day in House-Museum of Vagif Mustafazadeh, in Icheri Sheher.

The second part started at 14:00 and continued until 18:00 with various jazz songs.
