= Qalacıq, Qusar =

Qalacıq
- Municipality
- Location within Azerbaijan
- Coordinates: 41°30′54″N 48°31′12″E
- Country: Azerbaijan
- Rayon: Qusar

Population
  - Total: 1,313
- Time zone: UTC+4 (AZT)
  - Summer (DST): UTC+5 (AZT)

Qalacıq (also, Kaladzhyk and Kaldadzhyk) is a village and municipality in the Qusar Rayon of Azerbaijan. It has a population of 1,313.
