= Vagif Rza Ibrahimov =

Azerbaijani scientist in computational mathematics (b. 1947)

- Born: May 9, 1947; Jahri, Babek District, Nakhichevan ASSR, Azerbaijan SSR, Soviet Union
- Education: Doctor of Physical and Mathematical Sciences
- Occupations: Professor at Baku State University, membership of American Mathematical Society and European Mathematical Society
- Honours: Order of Glory

Vagif Rza Ibrahimov (born May 9, 1947, in Jahri, Azberbaijan) is an Azerbaijani mathematician specialising in numerical analysis, particularly numerical methods of differential, integral and integro-differential equations. He is a member of the Azerbaijan National Academy of Sciences (ANAS), the American Mathematical Society, the European Mathematical Society and is a professor at Baku State University. Ibrahimov has published more than 100 scientific articles in international journals and is best known for his contributions to multi-step methods, forward jumping methods and extensions of Dahlquist's theory.

== Biography ==
Vagif Rza Ibrahimov is a Doctor of Physical and Mathematical Sciences and a corresponding member of ANAS. Throughout his career, he has organised and participated in numerous scientific conferences and was a keynote speaker at the International Conference IAPE'19 in Oxford. Ibrahimov has been awarded the title of Honored Teacher of the Republic of Azerbaijan and was a winner of the 1st World Science Championship in Dubai.

== Research ==
Ibrahimov's research focuses on numerical methods for solving ordinary differential equations, integral equations and integro-differential equations. In his work on forward jumping methods, extrapolation and interpolation in a general form, he constructed formulas for estimating upper bounds on the accuracy of explicit and implicit stable multi-step methods of the Obreshkov type, thereby extending Dahlquist's theory. He was the first to demonstrate the advantages of forward jumping methods and developed special predictor-corrector schemes for their implementation. He also proved the existence of forward jumping methods with higher accuracy.

Ibrahimov determined the maximum degrees of stable and unstable multi-step methods, including Cowell-type methods, and his results completed the study of the relationship between order and degree for multi-step methods. He derived a special representation of the error of multi-step methods, which allowed him to determine the maximum possible increase in accuracy after a single application of the Richardson extrapolation and through linear combinations of multi-step methods. To achieve higher accuracy, he proposed the use of hybrid methods, which he applied to first- and second-order ordinary differential equations.

Ibrahimov established relationships among coefficients of multi-step methods (including methods with forward jumping) that serve as key criteria for constructing stable Obreshkov-type multi-step methods with maximal degree. These relations can also be used in the construction of two-sided methods, which make it possible to determine an interval containing the exact solution of the original problem.

Ibrahimov also developed specialised numerical methods for solving Volterra integral equations, in which the number of evaluations of the integral kernel at each step remains constant, and he established sufficient conditions for their convergence. Recognising these methods as a new direction in numerical analysis, he constructed approaches combining multi-step and hybrid methods for solving Volterra integral and integro-differential equations. He further developed methods with extended stability regions using special test equations.

For Volterra integral equations with symmetric limits, Ibrahimov proposed symmetric numerical schemes and constructed forward-jumping symmetric methods. To obtain stable methods with higher accuracy and extended stability regions, he introduced approaches combining hybrid and forward jumping techniques, which he applied to ordinary differential equations as well as integral and integro-differential equations of the Volterra type.

== Honours and awards ==
2023 - Winner of the World Science Championship held in Dubai (1st place)

2019 - Order of Glory

2014 - Diploma awarded by the Foundation for the Development of Science under the President of the Republic of Azerbaijan, the Ministry of Communications and High Technologies of the Republic of Azerbaijan and the State Commission of the Republic of Azerbaijan by UNESCO (awarded second place for the best work in the field of ICT)

2011 - Diploma "Development of Science", issued by the international organisation ASHE London

2009 - Honored Teacher of the Azerbaijan Republic

Research grants from the Science Development Fund under the President of the Republic of Azerbaijan (2011–2014; 2016–2019; 2019–2023)

== Career ==
From 2022–Present - Head, Department of Computational Mathematics [2], BSU

From 2005–Present - Professor of the Department of Computational Mathematics [2], BSU

2004-2011 - Vice-Rector, BSU

2000-2004 - Head of the Department of Computational Mathematics [2], BSU

1985-2005 - Associate Professor, Department of Computational Mathematics [2], BSU

1982-1985 - Senior Lecturer, Department of Computational Mathematics [2], BSU

1975-1982 - Assistant, Chair of Computational Mathematics [2], BSU

1972-1975 - Post-graduate student, Faculty of Mechanics and Mathematics, BSU

1970-1972 - Military service, Soviet Army

1969-1970 - Laboratory assistant, Department of Computational Mathematics [2], BSU

== Publications ==
- Multistep methods for solving the Cauchy problem for ordinary differential equations: Thesis for the soc. scientist. step. Doctor of Phys.-Math. Sciences: 01.01.07
- Some properties of Richardson extrapolation. Diff. Eq. No. 12,1990.
- A relationship between order and degree for a stable formula with advanced. J. Comput. mat. and mat.phys., No. 7 ,1990.
- On the maximal degree of the k-step Obrechkoffs method. Bulletin of Iranian Mathematical Society.Vol.28, №1, 2002.
- On one application of forward jumping methods. Applied Numerical Mathematics . Volume 72, October 2013
- Application of the hybrid method with constant coefficients to solving the integro-differential equations of first order. World Congress: 9th International conference on mathematical problems in engineering, aerospace and sciences, Vienna, Austria, 10–14 July 2012.
- The application of the hybrid method to solving the Volterra integro-differential equation. World Congress on Engineering 2013, London, U.K., 3–5 July 2013.
- On the research of multistep methods with constant coefficients. Monograph LAP LAMBERT Academic Publishing, 2013.
- On a Research of Hybrid Methods, Numerical Analysis and Its Applications, Springer, 2013, p. 395-402.
- A way to construct an algorithm that uses hybrid methods, Applied Mathematical Sciences, HIKARI Ltd, Vol. 7, 2013, no. 98., p. 4875-4890.
- The construction of the finite-difference method and application, Proceedings of the International Conference on Numerical Analysis and Applied Mathematics 2014 (ICNAAM-2014) AIP Conf. Proc. 1648, © 2015 AIP Publishing LLC,850049-1–850049-5.
- The application of second derivative methods to solving Volterra integro-differential equations, Proceedings of the International Conference on Numerical Analysis and Applied Mathematics 2014 (ICNAAM-2014) AIP Conf. Proc. 1648, © 2015 AIP Publishing LLC ,850048-1–850048-4.
- On the application of multistep methods to solving some problems of communication, Proceedings of the International Conference on Numerical Analysis and Applied Mathematics 2014 (ICNAAM-2014) AIP Conf. Proc. 1648, © 2015 AIP Publishing LLC, 850050-1–850050-5.
- Solving Volterra Integro-Differential Equation by the Second Derivative Methods, Applied Mathematics and Information Sciences, Volume 9, No. 5, Sep. 2015, pp. 2521-2527.
- General Theory of the Application of Multistep Methods to Calculation of the Energy of Signals, Wireless Com100munications, Networking and Applications Volume 348 of the series Lecture Notes in Electrical Engineering, Springer 1047-1056.
- Some refinement of the notion of symmetry for the Volterra integral equations and the construction of symmetrical methods to solve them, Journal of Computational and Applied Mathematics, 306 (2016), 1–9.
- John Butcher and hybrid methods, AIP Conference Proceedings 1863, 560029(2017); doi: http://aip.scitation.org/doi/abs/10.1063/1.4992712
