= Şahsevən, Kurdamir =

Şahsevən
- Municipality
- Location within Azerbaijan
- Coordinates: 40°22′18″N 48°11′47″E
- Country: Azerbaijan
- Rayon: Kurdamir
- Time zone: UTC+4 (AZT)
  - Summer (DST): UTC+5 (AZT)

Şahsevən (also, Shakhsevan) is a village and municipality in the Kurdamir Rayon of Azerbaijan.
