= Vagif Poetry Days =

Event in Azerbaijan

Vagif Poetry Days is an event organized in various historical and cultural places of Shusha, Azerbaijan, including the museum-mausoleum complex of Molla Panah Vagif restored by the Heydar Aliyev Foundation, as well as in front of Nateva's house, in the Shusha branch of the Azerbaijan National Carpet Museum.

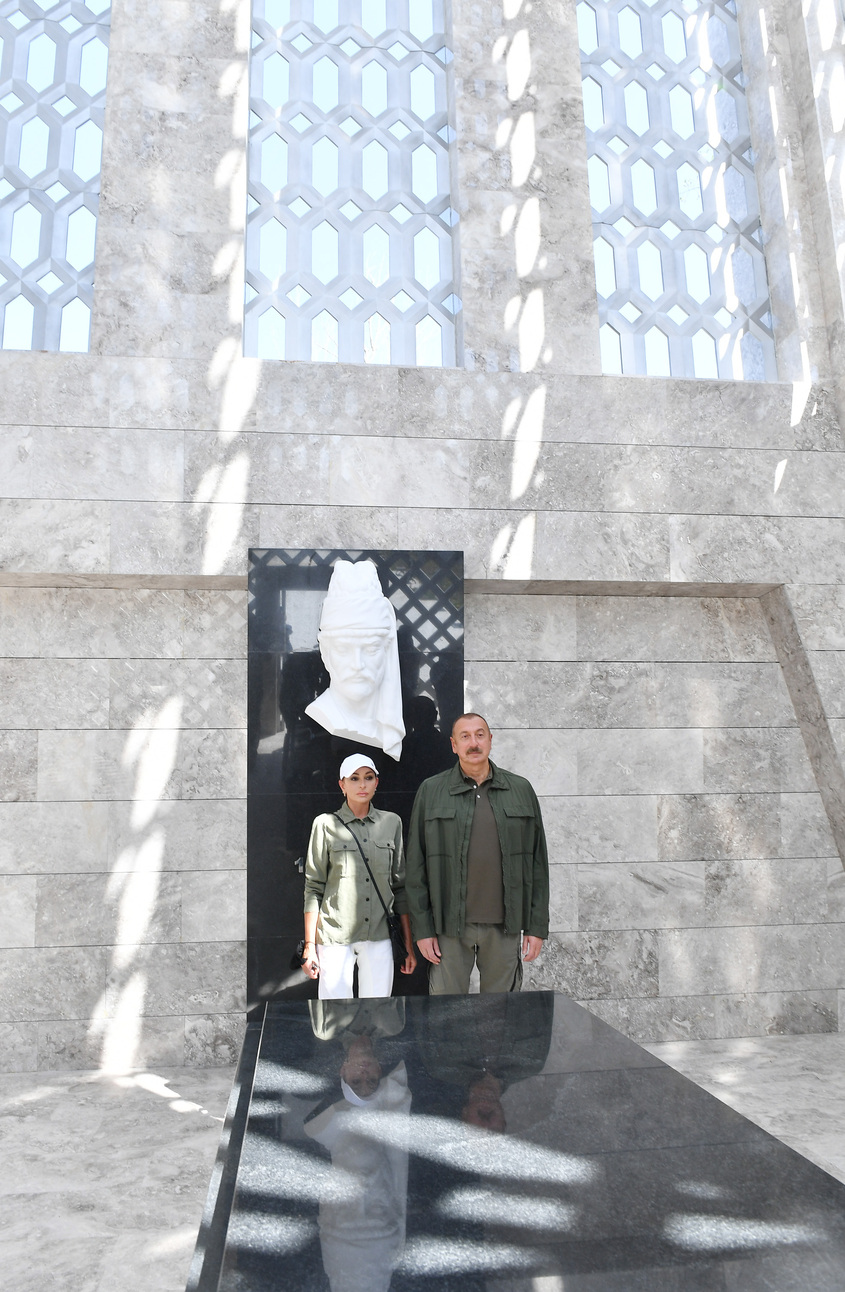
Visit of President Ilham Aliyev and First Lady Mehriban Aliyeva to the restored Vagif Mausoleum in Shusha city, Azerbaijan

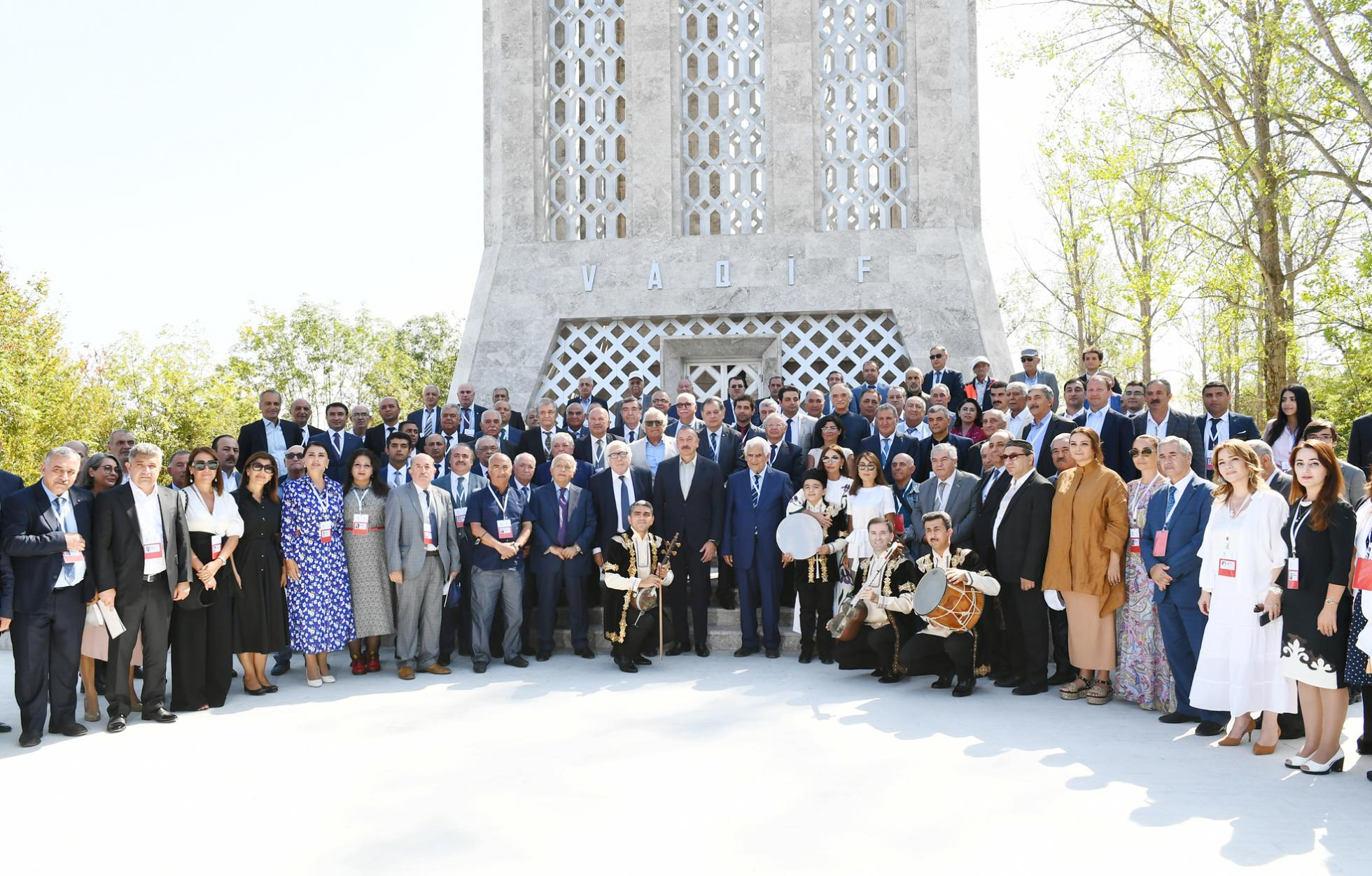
President of the Republic of Azerbaijan Ilham Aliyev and First Lady Mehriban Aliyeva attended the official opening ceremony of the Vagif Poetry Days

== History ==
The construction of the museum-mausoleum complex of the Azerbaijani poet Molla Panah Vagif started in 1977 on the basis of the project of architects A.Salamzade and E.Kanukov. The complex was opened in January 1982. The complex was built on the tomb of the Azerbaijani poet near the Jidir Plain in Shusha. About 80 exhibits reflecting the life of Vagif in Shusha were also exhibited here. National leader Heydar Aliyev, well-known literary and cultural figures attended the opening of the complex. As a result of the occupation of Shusha by the Armenian Armed Forces in May 1992, the building of the complex and dozens of exhibits on display were destroyed, and possible exhibits were transported to Armenia. After the liberation of Shusha by the Azerbaijani army on November 8, 2020, Vagif's museum-mausoleum complex was completely restored. On August 30, 2021, Vagif Poetry Days were reorganized by the Heydar Aliyev Foundation in the poet's hometown. On August 30, official opening of the Vagif's Poetry Days took place. Exhibitions “Karabakh is a pearl of the Azerbaijani culture”, “Again in the native land. Karabakh’s pearls of art” and “Memory. Photographic History” took place within the Vagif's Poetry Days held in Shusha, August 30. Examples of painting and sculpture being showcased at the exhibition “Karabakh is a pearl of the Azerbaijani culture”, arranged at the Shusha Art Gallery, takes visitors to joyful and grievous, real and fantastic, open and hidden, colourful and monochrome world. The main origin of inspiration in the artworks being exhibited here is Karabakh. In 1992, Armenian usurpers destroyed our national-spiritual, religious and historical-architectural monuments in Shusha, as well as the mausoleum of Molla Panah Vagif. Shusha had to wait for many years under military and political slavery to return to his busy days. But despite being under the occupation of Armenia for nearly 30 years, it did not lose its national identity and Azerbaijani spirit. Attempts by Armenians to change the cultural and political aura of Shusha, to present it as an Armenian city, did not yield any results. Shusha was able to retain its grandeur, magnificence, historical image. After liberation from the occupation, the Master Plan of Shusha was prepared shortly, the bust of the mighty poet Molla Panah Vagif and the museum-tomb complex were restored to their original appearance, the house-museum of Bulbul and the statue of Uzeyir Hajibeyov were inaugurated. As well as our territorial integrity, national pride, national dignity and spirituality, the "Kharibulbul" festival was also reorganized. The cultural capital of Azerbaijan again welcomed its natives and guests. On May 12, 2021, "Karabakh" shikeshte was heard in his native Shusha, as it was many years ago. With that, years later, the "Kharibulbul" festival was started. On August 29, 2021, Vagif Poetry Days were restored.

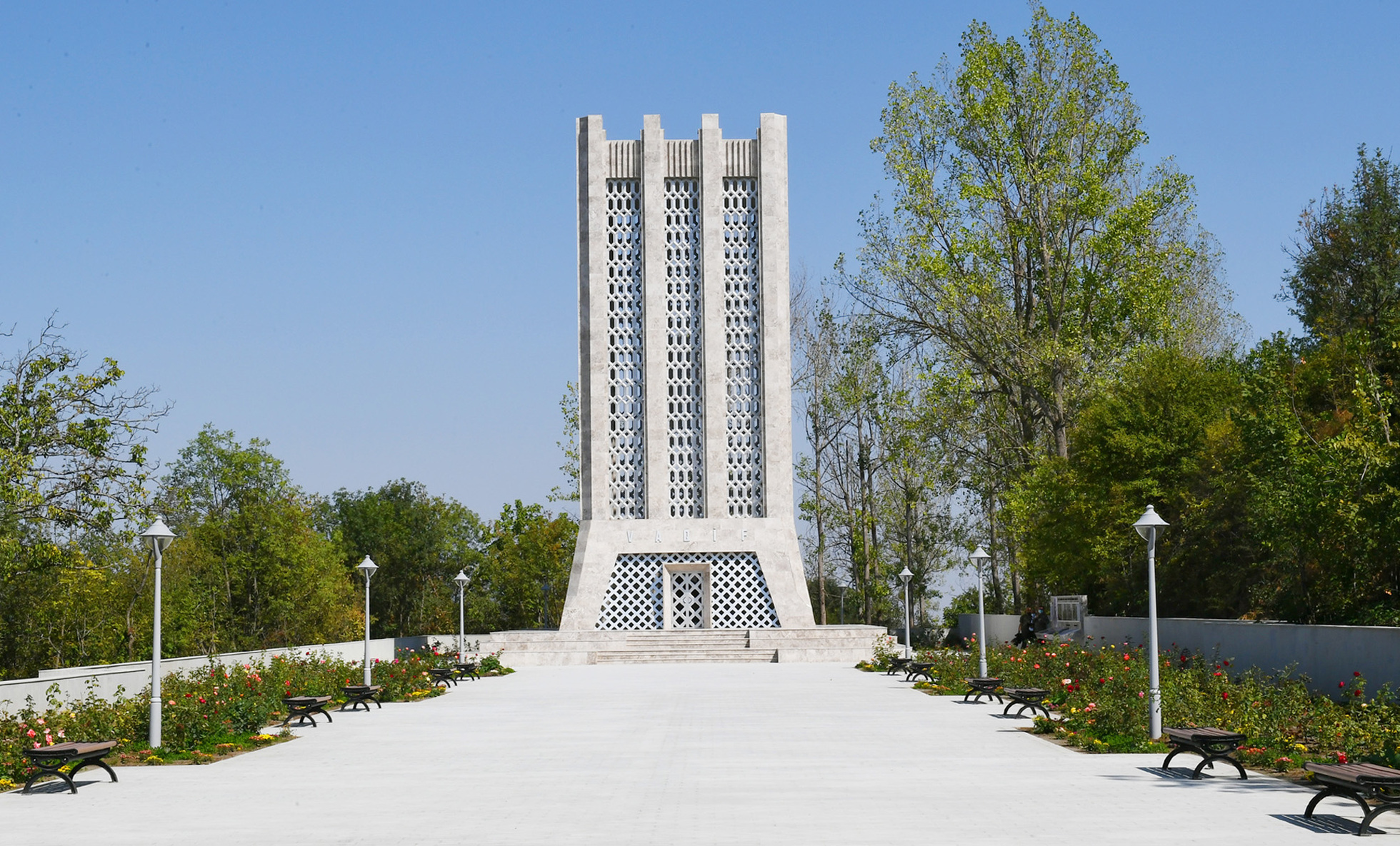
Museum-mausoleum of Molla Panah Vagif

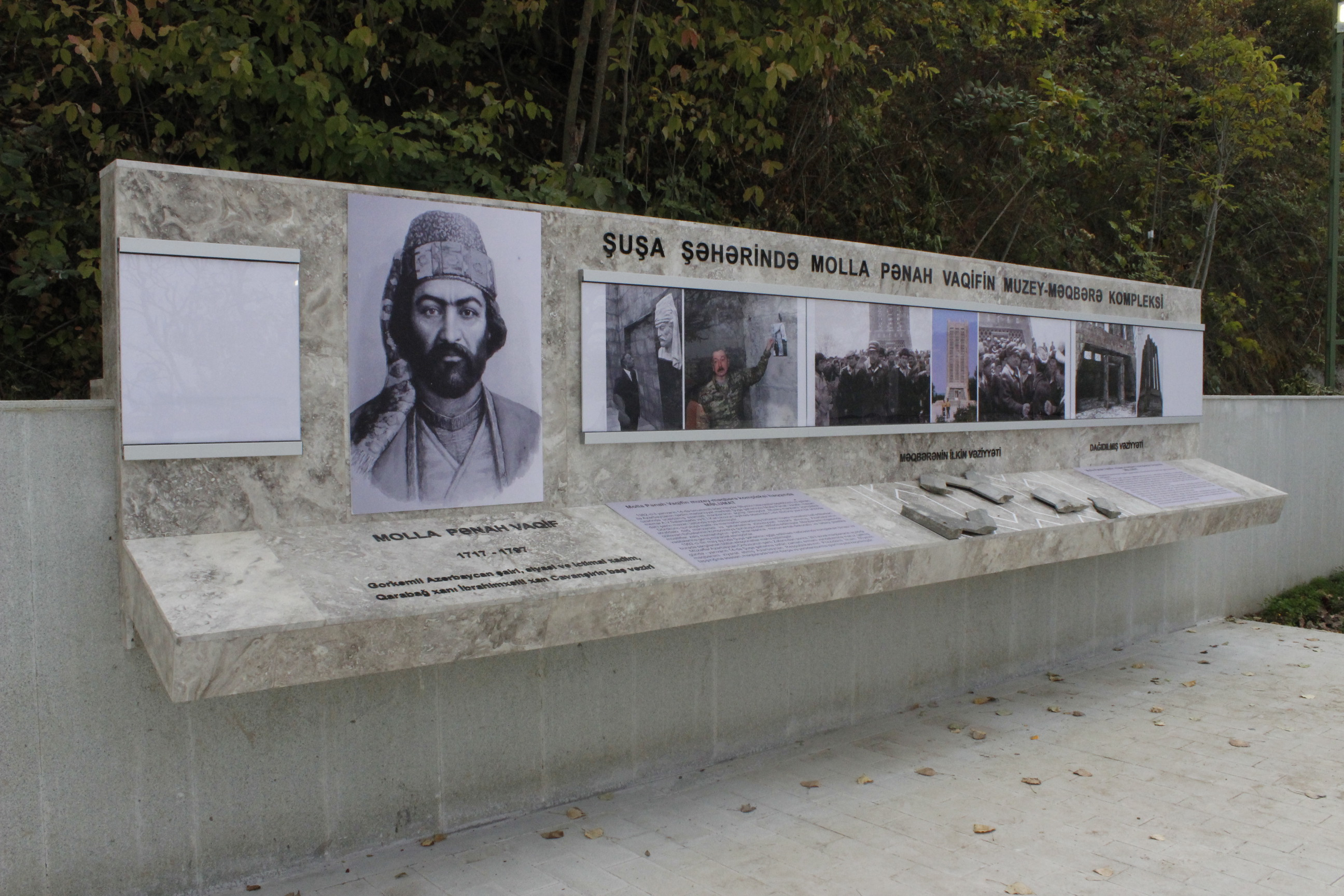
Museum-mausoleum

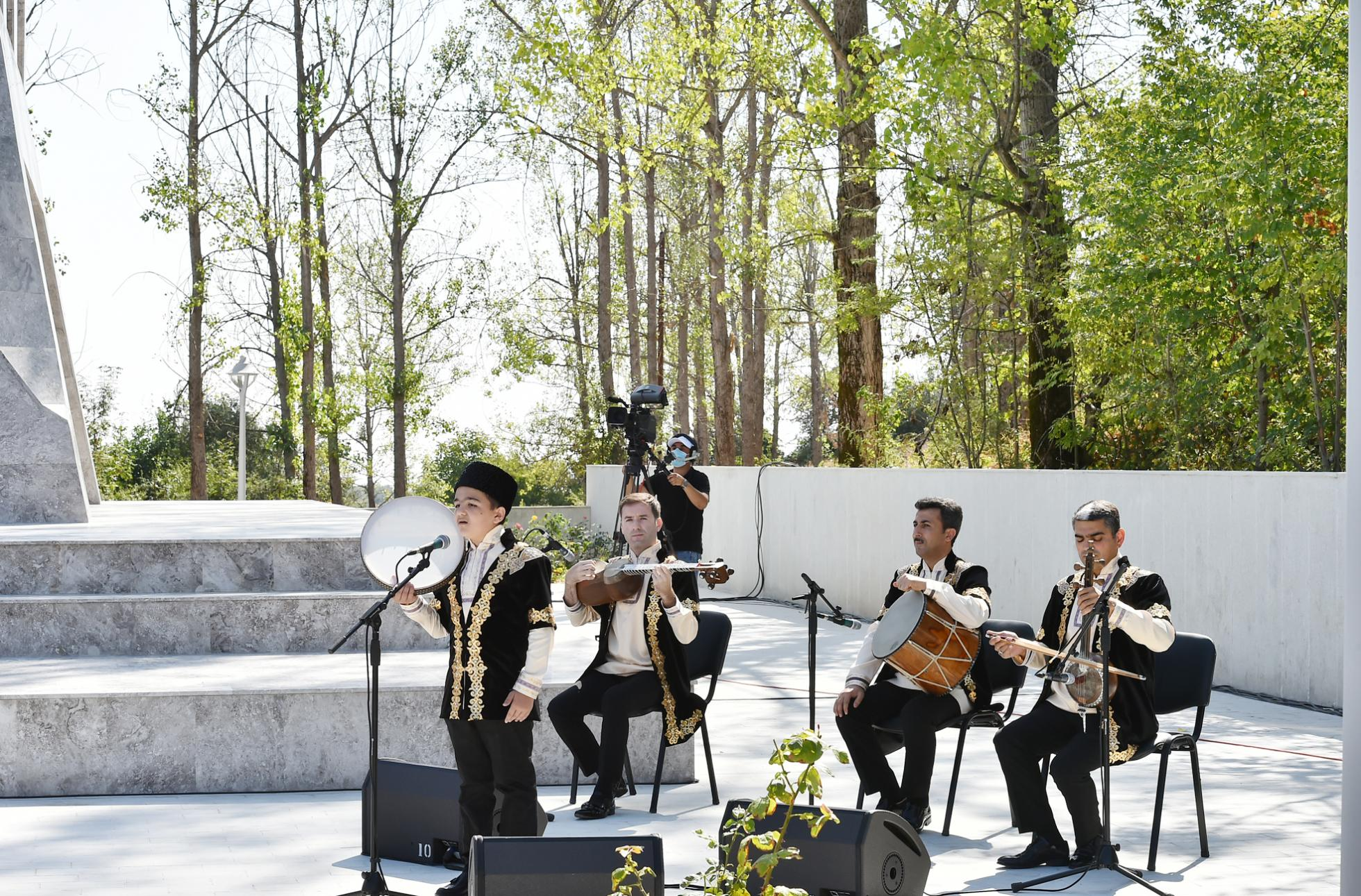

== See also ==
- Khari Bulbul Music Festival
- Uzeyir Hajibeyov International Music Festival
