= Qalacıq, Ismailli =

Qalacıq
- Municipality
- Location within Azerbaijan
- Coordinates: 40°57′33″N 48°03′09″E
- Country: Azerbaijan
- Rayon: Ismailli

Population
  - Total: 1,752
- Time zone: UTC+4 (AZT)
  - Summer (DST): UTC+5 (AZT)

Qalacıq (also, Kaladzhik and Kaladzhyk) is a village and municipality in the Ismailli Rayon of Azerbaijan. It has a population of 1,752.
