= The Union of Cinematographers of Azerbaijan =

Public creative organization

The Union of Cinematographers of Azerbaijan (Azerbaijani: Azərbaycan Kinematoqrafçılar İttifaqı) is a public creative organization. The Union unites Azerbaijani film artists on a voluntary basis.

== History ==
In January 1958, the Organizational Bureau of the Union of Azerbaijani Cinematography Workers was established. Filmmakers Latif Safarov and Huseyn Seidzade were elected Chairman and deputy of the organization. At first, there were five sections operating in the Bureau: "Artistic Cinematography", "Drama, Theory and Criticism", "Documentary and popular science Cinematography", "Science and Technology", "Film Lovers".

During the establishment of the Organizational Bureau, the Union of Workers of Azerbaijani Cinematography consisted of 82 people.

On February 10, 1960, the Cinema House was opened at the Union. Its members were filmmakers, writers, artists, composers, – about a hundred people in total. In 1960-1961 Union of Universities of Folk Culture was founded, where a group of 15 speakers worked.

The Union of Cinematographers of Azerbaijan was finally formed on January 11, 1963 at the First Constituent Congress of Workers of the Republican Cinematography.

Today, the Union is an independent organization operating based on its own Charter, endowed with legal and other rights arising from the Constitution of the Republic of Azerbaijan and the Law of Azerbaijan "On Non-Governmental Organizations (Public Associations and Foundations)".

== Activity ==
The main goal of the Union is the development of national cinema as an integral part of national culture and world cinema.

The Union of Cinematographers of Azerbaijan is a member of the Confederation of Unions of Cinematographers of the CIS and Baltic countries.

== Management ==
The chairman of the Union of Cinematographers of Azerbaijan is the film and theater playwright, director, producer, People's Writer of Azerbaijan, Rustam Ibragimbekov. He was elected the first secretary of the board of the organization at the fifth Congress of the Union, which was held in May 1981. At the ninth Congress in January 2003, he was elected Chairman of the Union. The acting first secretary of the Union is director Ali Isa Jabbarov.

The board of the Union includes such prominent artists and screenwriters as Asad Asadov, Vagif Behbutov, Baba Veziroglu, Firangiz Gurbanova, Mabud Maharramov, Shamil Najafzade, Anar Rzayev (Anar), Jamil Farajev, Shukufa Yusupova and others.

== Projects ==
In the early 1990s, the secretariat of the Board of the Union of Cinematographers decided to establish a competition for Azerbaijani national films. The first competition was held in 1991, the second – in 1993, the third – in 1995. Since 2003, there is another competition called Qızıl Çıraq ("Golden Lamp") held annually within the framework of the Union.

In 1996, the Baku International Film Festival ("East-West") was established by the Union of Cinematographers of Azerbaijan and the Foundation for the 100th Anniversary of World Cinema in Azerbaijan with the assistance of the Confederation of Cinematographers' Unions of the CIS and Baltic countries. The purpose of the festival is to promote the integration and mutual enrichment of two cultures, Eastern and Western. The last festival was held in September 2009.

International Film School (higher courses for screenwriters and directors) was established by the Union of Cinematographers of Azerbaijan in 2007 based on Decree №1993 of the President of Azerbaijan Ilham Aliyev dated February 23, 2007 "On the development of cinematography in Azerbaijan" and the corresponding decision of the Cabinet of Ministers. The main goal of the film school is to identify talents and train new highly professional personnel in the field of cinematography.

The "State program for the development of Azerbaijani cinema for 2008-2018" proposed by Rustam Ibragimbekov was approved by President Ilham Aliyev in 2008.

On July 9, 2012, the Cinematographic Award of the Union of Cinematographers of Azerbaijan was established. The award is annually awarded to representatives of the intelligentsia of Azerbaijan for their outstanding contribution to the development of cinema. The purpose of the award is to highlight the positive trends of national cinema. Among the awarded cinematographers were: Fikret Aliyev, Asif Rustamov, Fakhraddin Manafov, Zia Shikhlinsky, Firangiz Gurbanova, Fuad Poladov, Javid Akhadov, Javanshir Guliyev, Tahir Aliyev, Nizami Abbas, Asad Asadov, Adil Gulamov, Rafig Huseynli, Kamal Seidov, Mehriban Zeki, Mirbala Salimli, Nazim Rza, Anar, Rauf Aliyev, Ramiz Abutalibov etc.

== See also ==
Cinema of Azerbaijan
