= List of World Championships medalists in wrestling (freestyle) =

This is the List of World Championships medalists in men's freestyle wrestling.

== Light flyweight ==
- 48 kg: 1969–1995

Games	Gold	Silver	Bronze
1969 Mar del Plata	Ebrahim Javadi (IRN)	Roman Dmitriev (URS)	Akihiko Umeda (JPN)
1970 Edmonton	Ebrahim Javadi (IRN)	Akihiko Umeda (JPN)	Roman Dmitriev (URS)
1971 Sofia	Ebrahim Javadi (IRN)	Bazarragchaagiin Jamsran (MGL)	Ognyan Nikolov (BUL)
1973 Tehran	Roman Dmitriev (URS)	Hasan Isaev (BUL)	Ochirdolgoryn Enkhtaivan (MGL)
1974 Istanbul	Hasan Isaev (BUL)	Rafig Hajiyev (URS)	Gordon Bertie (CAN)
1975 Minsk	Hasan Isaev (BUL)	Anatoly Kharitonyuk (URS)	Kim Hwa-kyung (KOR)
1977 Lausanne	Anatoly Beloglazov (URS)	Nobuo Fujisawa (JPN)	Kim Hwa-kyung (KOR)
1978 Mexico City	Sergey Kornilaev (URS)	Nobuo Fujisawa (JPN)	Mohammad Bazmavar (IRN)
1979 San Diego	Sergey Kornilaev (URS)	Bobby Weaver (USA)	Jan Falandys (POL)
1981 Skopje	Sergey Kornilaev (URS)	Son Gab-do (KOR)	William Rosado (USA)
1982 Edmonton	Sergey Kornilaev (URS)	Ali Mehmedov (BUL)	Šaban Trstena (YUG)
1983 Kyiv	Kim Chol-han (PRK)	Aleksandr Dorzhu (URS)	Jan Falandys (POL)
1985 Budapest	Kim Chol-han (PRK)	Majid Torkan (IRN)	Vasily Gogolev (URS)
1986 Budapest	Ri Jae-sik (PRK)	László Bíró (HUN)	Mikhail Kushnir (URS)
1987 Clermont-Ferrand	Ri Jae-sik (PRK)	Lee Sang-ho (KOR)	Sergey Karamchakov (URS)
1989 Martigny	Kim Jong-shin (KOR)	Ri Hak-son (PRK)	Gnel Medzhlumyan (URS)
1990 Tokyo	Aldo Martínez (CUB)	Marian Avramov (BUL)	Takashi Kobayashi (JPN)
1991 Varna	Vugar Orujov (URS)	Kim Il (PRK)	Kim Jong-shin (KOR)
1993 Toronto	Alexis Vila (CUB)	Vugar Orujov (BLR)	Jung Soon-won (KOR)
1994 Istanbul	Alexis Vila (CUB)	Jung Soon-won (KOR)	Peter Yumshanov (RUS)
1995 Atlanta	Vugar Orujov (RUS)	Alexis Vila (CUB)	Armen Mkrtchyan (ARM)

== Flyweight ==
- 52 kg: 1951–1995
- 54 kg: 1997–2001

Games	Gold	Silver	Bronze
1951 Helsinki	Ali Yücel (TUR)	Mahmoud Mollaghasemi (IRN)	Bengt Johansson (SWE)
1954 Tokyo	Hüseyin Akbaş (TUR)	Yushu Kitano (JPN)	Mirian Tsalkalamanidze (URS)
1957 Istanbul	Mehmet Kartal (TUR)	Mirian Tsalkalamanidze (URS)	Luigi Chinazzo (ITA)
1959 Tehran	Ali Aliev (URS)	Ahmet Bilek (TUR)	Muhammad Niaz Din (PAK)
1961 Yokohama	Ali Aliev (URS)	Nasrollah Soltaninejad (IRN)	Cemal Yanılmaz (TUR)
1962 Toledo	Ali Aliev (URS)	Noriyuki Harada (JPN)	Satılmış Tektaş (TUR)
1963 Sofia	Cemal Yanılmaz (TUR)	Ali Aliev (URS)	Stoyko Malov (BUL)
1965 Manchester	Yoshihisa Yoshida (JPN)	Bayu Baev (BUL)	László Ölveti (HUN)
1966 Toledo	Chang Chang-sun (KOR)	Yasuo Katsumura (JPN)	Rick Sanders (USA)
1967 New Delhi	Shigeo Nakata (JPN)	Rick Sanders (USA)	Oh Jung-yong (KOR)
1969 Mar del Plata	Rick Sanders (USA)	Mohammad Ghorbani (IRN)	Tariel Alibegashvili (URS)
1970 Edmonton	Ali Rıza Alan (TUR)	Bayu Baev (BUL)	Mohammad Ghorbani (IRN)
1971 Sofia	Mohammad Ghorbani (IRN)	Bayu Baev (BUL)	Aminula Nasrulaev (URS)
1973 Tehran	Ebrahim Javadi (IRN)	Arsen Alakhverdiev (URS)	Yuji Takada (JPN)
1974 Istanbul	Yuji Takada (JPN)	Ali Rıza Alan (TUR)	Roman Dmitriev (URS)
1975 Minsk	Yuji Takada (JPN)	Telman Pashayev (URS)	Dimitar Filipov (BUL)
1977 Lausanne	Yuji Takada (JPN)	Władysław Stecyk (POL)	Hartmut Reich (GDR)
1978 Mexico City	Anatoly Beloglazov (URS)	Hartmut Reich (GDR)	Luis Ocaña (CUB)
1979 San Diego	Yuji Takada (JPN)	James Haines (USA)	Hartmut Reich (GDR)
1981 Skopje	Toshio Asakura (JPN)	Hartmut Reich (GDR)	Nanzadyn Büregdaa (MGL)
1982 Edmonton	Hartmut Reich (GDR)	Osman Efendiev (URS)	Joe Gonzales (USA)
1983 Kyiv	Valentin Yordanov (BUL)	Toshio Asakura (JPN)	Anatoly Beloglazov (URS)
1985 Budapest	Valentin Yordanov (BUL)	Minatulla Daibov (URS)	Mitsuru Sato (JPN)
1986 Budapest	Kim Yong-sik (PRK)	Mitsuru Sato (JPN)	Valentin Yordanov (BUL)
1987 Clermont-Ferrand	Valentin Yordanov (BUL)	Kim Yong-sik (PRK)	Mitsuru Sato (JPN)
1989 Martigny	Valentin Yordanov (BUL)	Vladimir Toguzov (URS)	Majid Torkan (IRN)
1990 Tokyo	Majid Torkan (IRN)	Valentin Yordanov (BUL)	Aslan Agaev (URS)
1991 Varna	Zeke Jones (USA)	Valentin Yordanov (BUL)	Vladimir Toguzov (URS)
1993 Toronto	Valentin Yordanov (BUL)	Gholamreza Mohammadi (IRI)	Sergey Zambalov (RUS)
1994 Istanbul	Valentin Yordanov (BUL)	Namig Abdullayev (AZE)	Gholamreza Mohammadi (IRI)
1995 Atlanta	Valentin Yordanov (BUL)	Gholamreza Mohammadi (IRI)	Zeke Jones (USA)
1997 Krasnoyarsk	Wilfredo García (CUB)	Jin Ju-dong (PRK)	Maulen Mamyrov (KAZ)
1998 Tehran	Sammie Henson (USA)	Namig Abdullayev (AZE)	Gholamreza Mohammadi (IRI)
1999 Ankara	Kim Woo-yong (KOR)	Adkhamjon Achilov (UZB)	Oleksandr Zakharuk (UKR)
2001 Sofia	Herman Kantoyeu (BLR)	Babak Nourzad (IRI)	Aleksandr Kontoev (RUS)

== Bantamweight ==
- 57 kg: 1951–1995
- 58 kg: 1997–2001
- 55 kg: 2002–2013
- 57 kg: 2014–

Games	Gold	Silver	Bronze
1951 Helsinki	Nasuh Akar (TUR)	Niilo Turkkila (FIN)	Mehdi Yaghoubi (IRN)
1954 Tokyo	Mustafa Dağıstanlı (TUR)	Lajos Bencze (HUN)	Tauno Jaskari (FIN)
1957 Istanbul	Hüseyin Akbaş (TUR)	Tauno Jaskari (FIN)	Yasuyuki Shimamura (JPN)
1959 Tehran	Hüseyin Akbaş (TUR)	Tauno Jaskari (FIN)	Vladimir Arsenyan (URS)
1961 Yokohama	Ebrahim Seifpour (IRN)	János Varga (HUN)	Hüseyin Akbaş (TUR)
1962 Toledo	Hüseyin Akbaş (TUR)	Masaaki Hatta (JPN)	János Varga (HUN)
1963 Sofia	Aydin Ibrahimov (URS)	Hiroshi Ikeda (JPN)	Mladen Georgiev (BUL)
1965 Manchester	Tomiaki Fukuda (JPN)	Mohammad Ali Farrokhian (IRN)	Karl Dodrimont (FRG)
1966 Toledo	Ali Aliev (URS)	Hasan Sevinç (TUR)	Aboutaleb Talebi (IRN)
1967 New Delhi	Ali Aliev (URS)	Bishambar Singh (IND)	Aboutaleb Talebi (IRN)
1969 Mar del Plata	Tadamichi Tanaka (JPN)	Donald Behm (USA)	Aboutaleb Talebi (IRN)
1970 Edmonton	Hideaki Yanagida (JPN)	An Jae-won (KOR)	Yancho Patrikov (BUL)
1971 Sofia	Hideaki Yanagida (JPN)	Donald Behm (USA)	Megdiin Khoilogdorj (MGL)
1973 Tehran	Mohsen Farahvashi (IRN)	Megdiin Khoilogdorj (MGL)	Vladimir Yumin (URS)
1974 Istanbul	Vladimir Yumin (URS)	Ramezan Kheder (IRN)	Hans-Dieter Brüchert (GDR)
1975 Minsk	Masao Arai (JPN)	Vladimir Yumin (URS)	Miho Dukov (BUL)
1977 Lausanne	Tadashi Sasaki (JPN)	Viktor Alekseev (URS)	Jack Reinwand (USA)
1978 Mexico City	Hideaki Tomiyama (JPN)	Buzay Ibragimov (URS)	Dugarsürengiin Oyuunbold (MGL)
1979 San Diego	Hideaki Tomiyama (JPN)	Sergey Beloglazov (URS)	Joe Corso (USA)
1981 Skopje	Sergey Beloglazov (URS)	Stefan Ivanov (BUL)	Hideaki Tomiyama (JPN)
1982 Edmonton	Anatoly Beloglazov (URS)	Hideaki Tomiyama (JPN)	Stefan Ivanov (BUL)
1983 Kyiv	Sergey Beloglazov (URS)	Hideaki Tomiyama (JPN)	Stefan Ivanov (BUL)
1985 Budapest	Sergey Beloglazov (URS)	Kevin Darkus (USA)	Georgi Kalchev (BUL)
1986 Budapest	Sergey Beloglazov (URS)	Georgi Kalchev (BUL)	Barry Davis (USA)
1987 Clermont-Ferrand	Sergey Beloglazov (URS)	Barry Davis (USA)	Ahmet Ak (TUR)
1989 Martigny	Kim Yong-sik (PRK)	Askari Mohammadian (IRN)	Rumen Pavlov (BUL)
1990 Tokyo	Alejandro Puerto (CUB)	Rumen Pavlov (BUL)	Sergey Smal (URS)
1991 Varna	Sergey Smal (URS)	Brad Penrith (USA)	Oveis Mallah (IRN)
1993 Toronto	Terry Brands (USA)	Shim Sang-hyo (KOR)	Tserenbaataryn Tsogtbayar (MGL)
1994 Istanbul	Alejandro Puerto (CUB)	Mohammad Talaei (IRI)	Bagavdin Umakhanov (RUS)
1995 Atlanta	Terry Brands (USA)	Guivi Sissaouri (CAN)	Harun Doğan (TUR)
1997 Krasnoyarsk	Mohammad Talaei (IRI)	Ramil Islamov (UZB)	Guivi Sissaouri (CAN)
1998 Tehran	Alireza Dabir (IRI)	Harun Doğan (TUR)	Guivi Sissaouri (CAN)
1999 Ankara	Harun Doğan (TUR)	Alireza Dabir (IRI)	Damir Zakhartdinov (UZB)
2001 Sofia	Guivi Sissaouri (CAN)	Oyuunbilegiin Pürevbaatar (MGL)	David Pogosian (GEO)
2002 Tehran	René Montero (CUB)	Namig Abdullayev (AZE)	Oleksandr Zakharuk (UKR)
2003 New York City	Dilshod Mansurov (UZB)	Ghenadie Tulbea (MDA)	Oleksandr Zakharuk (UKR)
2005 Budapest	Dilshod Mansurov (UZB)	Radoslav Velikov (BUL)	Bayaraagiin Naranbaatar (MGL)
2005 Budapest	Dilshod Mansurov (UZB)	Radoslav Velikov (BUL)	Jon Hyon-guk (PRK)
2006 Guangzhou	Radoslav Velikov (BUL)	Besik Kudukhov (RUS)	Namig Abdullayev (AZE)
2006 Guangzhou	Radoslav Velikov (BUL)	Besik Kudukhov (RUS)	Sammie Henson (USA)
2007 Baku	Besik Kudukhov (RUS)	Bayaraagiin Naranbaatar (MGL)	Rizvan Gadzhiev (BLR)
2007 Baku	Besik Kudukhov (RUS)	Bayaraagiin Naranbaatar (MGL)	Andy Moreno (CUB)
2009 Herning	Yang Kyong-il (PRK)	Sezar Akgül (TUR)	Rizvan Gadzhiev (BLR)
2009 Herning	Yang Kyong-il (PRK)	Sezar Akgül (TUR)	Viktor Lebedev (RUS)
2010 Moscow	Viktor Lebedev (RUS)	Toghrul Asgarov (AZE)	Frank Chamizo (CUB)
2010 Moscow	Viktor Lebedev (RUS)	Toghrul Asgarov (AZE)	Yasuhiro Inaba (JPN)
2011 Istanbul	Viktor Lebedev (RUS)	Radoslav Velikov (BUL)	Hassan Rahimi (IRI)
2011 Istanbul	Viktor Lebedev (RUS)	Radoslav Velikov (BUL)	Daulet Niyazbekov (KAZ)
2013 Budapest	Hassan Rahimi (IRI)	Amit Kumar Dahiya (IND)	Nariman Israpilov (RUS)
2013 Budapest	Hassan Rahimi (IRI)	Amit Kumar Dahiya (IND)	Sezar Akgül (TUR)
2014 Tashkent	Yang Kyong-il (PRK)	Vladimer Khinchegashvili (GEO)	Uladzislau Andreyeu (BLR)
2014 Tashkent	Yang Kyong-il (PRK)	Vladimer Khinchegashvili (GEO)	Hassan Rahimi (IRI)
2015 Las Vegas	Vladimer Khinchegashvili (GEO)	Hassan Rahimi (IRI)	Erdenebatyn Bekhbayar (MGL)
2015 Las Vegas	Vladimer Khinchegashvili (GEO)	Hassan Rahimi (IRI)	Viktor Lebedev (RUS)
2017 Paris	Yuki Takahashi (JPN)	Thomas Gilman (USA)	Erdenebatyn Bekhbayar (MGL)
2017 Paris	Yuki Takahashi (JPN)	Thomas Gilman (USA)	Andriy Yatsenko (UKR)
2018 Budapest	Zaur Uguev (RUS)	Nurislam Sanayev (KAZ)	Yuki Takahashi (JPN)
2018 Budapest	Zaur Uguev (RUS)	Nurislam Sanayev (KAZ)	Süleyman Atlı (TUR)
2019 Nur-Sultan	Zaur Uguev (RUS)	Süleyman Atlı (TUR)	Ravi Kumar Dahiya (IND)
2019 Nur-Sultan	Zaur Uguev (RUS)	Süleyman Atlı (TUR)	Nurislam Sanayev (KAZ)
2021 Oslo	Thomas Gilman (USA)	Alireza Sarlak (IRI)	Aryan Tsiutryn (BLR)
2021 Oslo	Thomas Gilman (USA)	Alireza Sarlak (IRI)	Horst Lehr (GER)
2022 Belgrade	Zelimkhan Abakarov (ALB)	Thomas Gilman (USA)	Zandanbudyn Zanabazar (MGL)
2022 Belgrade	Zelimkhan Abakarov (ALB)	Thomas Gilman (USA)	Stevan Mićić (SRB)
2023 Belgrade	Stevan Mićić (SRB)	Rei Higuchi (JPN)	Zelimkhan Abakarov (ALB)
2023 Belgrade	Stevan Mićić (SRB)	Rei Higuchi (JPN)	Arsen Harutyunyan (ARM)
2025 Zagreb	Han Chong-song (PRK)	Bekzat Almaz Uulu (KGZ)	Arsen Harutyunyan (ARM)
2025 Zagreb	Han Chong-song (PRK)	Bekzat Almaz Uulu (KGZ)	Gulomjon Abdullaev (UZB)
2026 Astana	Spencer Lee (USA)	Roman Bravo-Young (MEX)	Han Chong-song (PRK)
2026 Astana	Spencer Lee (USA)	Roman Bravo-Young (MEX)	Abubakar Mutaliev (RUS)

== Featherweight ==
- 62 kg: 1951–1961
- 63 kg: 1962–1967
- 62 kg: 1969–1995
- 63 kg: 1997–2001
- 60 kg: 2002–2013
- 61 kg: 2014–

Games	Gold	Silver	Bronze
1951 Helsinki	Nurettin Zafer (TUR)	Ilmari Ruikka (FIN)	Henry Holmberg (SWE)
1954 Tokyo	Shozo Sasahara (JPN)	Bayram Şit (TUR)	Nikolay Muzashvili (URS)
1957 Istanbul	Mustafa Dağıstanlı (TUR)	Hossein Mollaghasemi (IRN)	Norayr Musheghyan (URS)
1959 Tehran	Mustafa Dağıstanlı (TUR)	Stancho Kolev (BUL)	Muhammad Akhtar (PAK)
1961 Yokohama	Vladimir Rubashvili (URS)	Yunus Pehlivan (TUR)	Hamid Tavakkol (IRN)
1962 Toledo	Osamu Watanabe (JPN)	Mohammad Khadem (IRN)	Ewald Tauer (FRG)
1963 Sofia	Osamu Watanabe (JPN)	Ebrahim Seifpour (IRN)	Stancho Kolev (BUL)
1965 Manchester	Ebrahim Seifpour (IRN)	Stancho Kolev (BUL)	Takeo Morita (JPN)
1966 Toledo	Masaaki Kaneko (JPN)	Bobby Douglas (USA)	Nihat Kabanlı (TUR)
1967 New Delhi	Masaaki Kaneko (JPN)	Elkan Tedeev (URS)	Mike Young (USA)
1969 Mar del Plata	Takeo Morita (JPN)	Shamseddin Seyed-Abbasi (IRN)	Zagalav Abdulbekov (URS)
1970 Edmonton	Shamseddin Seyed-Abbasi (IRN)	Kiyoshi Abe (JPN)	Mike Young (USA)
1971 Sofia	Zagalav Abdulbekov (URS)	Shamseddin Seyed-Abbasi (IRN)	Kiyoshi Abe (JPN)
1973 Tehran	Zagalav Abdulbekov (URS)	Heinz Stahr (GDR)	Mohammad Reza Navaei (IRN)
1974 Istanbul	Zevegiin Oidov (MGL)	Doncho Zhekov (BUL)	Vehbi Akdağ (TUR)
1975 Minsk	Zevegiin Oidov (MGL)	Théodule Toulotte (FRA)	Yang Jung-mo (KOR)
1977 Lausanne	Vladimir Yumin (URS)	Jim Humphrey (USA)	Miho Dukov (BUL)
1978 Mexico City	Vladimir Yumin (URS)	Yang Jung-mo (KOR)	Mohammad Rezaei (IRN)
1979 San Diego	Vladimir Yumin (URS)	Miho Dukov (BUL)	Andre Metzger (USA)
1981 Skopje	Simeon Shterev (BUL)	Marian Skubacz (POL)	Viktor Alekseev (URS)
1982 Edmonton	Sergey Beloglazov (URS)	Simeon Shterev (BUL)	József Orbán (HUN)
1983 Kyiv	Viktor Alekseev (URS)	Lee Roy Smith (USA)	Simeon Shterev (BUL)
1985 Budapest	Viktor Alekseev (URS)	Avirmediin Enkhee (MGL)	Alben Kumbarov (BUL)
1986 Budapest	Khazar Isayev (URS)	Joe McFarland (USA)	Avirmediin Enkhee (MGL)
1987 Clermont-Ferrand	John Smith (USA)	Khazar Isayev (URS)	Kazuhito Sakae (JPN)
1989 Martigny	John Smith (USA)	Gary Bohay (CAN)	Karsten Polky (GDR)
1990 Tokyo	John Smith (USA)	Rosen Vasilev (BUL)	Gadzhi Rashidov (URS)
1991 Varna	John Smith (USA)	Giovanni Schillaci (ITA)	Gadzhi Rashidov (URS)
1993 Toronto	Tom Brands (USA)	Lázaro Reinoso (CUB)	Ramil Ataulin (UZB)
1994 Istanbul	Magomed Azizov (RUS)	Sergey Smal (BLR)	Giovanni Schillaci (ITA)
1995 Atlanta	Elbrus Tedeyev (UKR)	Takahiro Wada (JPN)	Magomed Azizov (RUS)
1997 Krasnoyarsk	Abbas Hajkenari (IRI)	Cary Kolat (USA)	Magomed Azizov (RUS)
1998 Tehran	Serafim Barzakov (BUL)	Abbas Hajkenari (IRI)	Cary Kolat (USA)
1999 Ankara	Elbrus Tedeyev (UKR)	Jang Jae-sung (KOR)	Ramil Islamov (UZB)
2001 Sofia	Serafim Barzakov (BUL)	Alireza Dabir (IRI)	Elbrus Tedeyev (UKR)
2002 Tehran	Aram Margaryan (ARM)	Oyuunbilegiin Pürevbaatar (MGL)	Mohammad Talaei (IRI)
2003 New York City	Arif Abdullayev (AZE)	Yandro Quintana (CUB)	Song Jae-myung (KOR)
2005 Budapest	Alan Dudaev (RUS)	Yandro Quintana (CUB)	Martin Berberyan (ARM)
2005 Budapest	Alan Dudaev (RUS)	Yandro Quintana (CUB)	Morad Mohammadi (IRI)
2006 Guangzhou	Morad Mohammadi (IRI)	Mike Zadick (USA)	Noriyuki Takatsuka (JPN)
2006 Guangzhou	Morad Mohammadi (IRI)	Mike Zadick (USA)	Mavlet Batirov (RUS)
2007 Baku	Mavlet Batirov (RUS)	Anatolie Guidea (BUL)	Sahit Prizreni (ALB)
2007 Baku	Mavlet Batirov (RUS)	Anatolie Guidea (BUL)	Bazar Bazarguruev (KGZ)
2009 Herning	Besik Kudukhov (RUS)	Zelimkhan Huseynov (AZE)	Vasyl Fedoryshyn (UKR)
2009 Herning	Besik Kudukhov (RUS)	Zelimkhan Huseynov (AZE)	Dilshod Mansurov (UZB)
2010 Moscow	Besik Kudukhov (RUS)	Vasyl Fedoryshyn (UKR)	Zelimkhan Huseynov (AZE)
2010 Moscow	Besik Kudukhov (RUS)	Vasyl Fedoryshyn (UKR)	Morad Mohammadi (IRI)
2011 Istanbul	Besik Kudukhov (RUS)	Franklin Gómez (PUR)	Kenichi Yumoto (JPN)
2011 Istanbul	Besik Kudukhov (RUS)	Franklin Gómez (PUR)	Dauren Zhumagaziyev (KAZ)
2013 Budapest	Bekkhan Goygereev (RUS)	Vladimir Dubov (BUL)	Bajrang Punia (IND)
2013 Budapest	Bekkhan Goygereev (RUS)	Vladimir Dubov (BUL)	Masoud Esmaeilpour (IRI)
2014 Tashkent	Haji Aliyev (AZE)	Masoud Esmaeilpour (IRI)	Yowlys Bonne (CUB)
2014 Tashkent	Haji Aliyev (AZE)	Masoud Esmaeilpour (IRI)	Enkhsaikhany Nyam-Ochir (MGL)
2015 Las Vegas	Haji Aliyev (AZE)	Batboldyn Nomin (MGL)	Vladimir Dubov (BUL)
2015 Las Vegas	Haji Aliyev (AZE)	Batboldyn Nomin (MGL)	Vasyl Shuptar (UKR)
2016 Budapest	Logan Stieber (USA)	Beka Lomtadze (GEO)	Akhmednabi Gvarzatilov (AZE)
2016 Budapest	Logan Stieber (USA)	Beka Lomtadze (GEO)	Akhmed Chakaev (RUS)
2017 Paris	Haji Aliyev (AZE)	Gadzhimurad Rashidov (RUS)	Yowlys Bonne (CUB)
2017 Paris	Haji Aliyev (AZE)	Gadzhimurad Rashidov (RUS)	Vladimer Khinchegashvili (GEO)
2018 Budapest	Yowlys Bonne (CUB)	Gadzhimurad Rashidov (RUS)	Tümenbilegiin Tüvshintulga (MGL)
2018 Budapest	Yowlys Bonne (CUB)	Gadzhimurad Rashidov (RUS)	Joe Colon (USA)
2019 Nur-Sultan	Beka Lomtadze (GEO)	Magomedrasul Idrisov (RUS)	Rahul Aware (IND)
2019 Nur-Sultan	Beka Lomtadze (GEO)	Magomedrasul Idrisov (RUS)	Behnam Ehsanpour (IRI)
2021 Oslo	Abasgadzhi Magomedov (RWF)	Daton Fix (USA)	Arsen Harutyunyan (ARM)
2021 Oslo	Abasgadzhi Magomedov (RWF)	Daton Fix (USA)	Toshihiro Hasegawa (JPN)
2022 Belgrade	Rei Higuchi (JPN)	Reza Atri (IRI)	Arsen Harutyunyan (ARM)
2022 Belgrade	Rei Higuchi (JPN)	Reza Atri (IRI)	Narmandakhyn Narankhüü (MGL)
2023 Belgrade	Vito Arujau (USA)	Abasgadzhi Magomedov (AIN)	Shota Phartenadze (GEO)
2023 Belgrade	Vito Arujau (USA)	Abasgadzhi Magomedov (AIN)	Taiyrbek Zhumashbek Uulu (KGZ)
2024 Tirana	Masanosuke Ono (JPN)	Ahmet Duman (TUR)	Tseveensürengiin Tsogbadrakh (MGL)
2024 Tirana	Masanosuke Ono (JPN)	Ahmet Duman (TUR)	Vito Arujau (USA)
2025 Zagreb	Zaur Uguev (UWW)	Ahmad Javan (IRI)	Nuraddin Novruzov (AZE)
2025 Zagreb	Zaur Uguev (UWW)	Ahmad Javan (IRI)	Assylzhan Yessengeldi (KAZ)
2026 Astana	Ahmad Javan (IRI)	Zaur Uguev (RUS)	Kim Kwang-myong (PRK)
2026 Astana	Ahmad Javan (IRI)	Zaur Uguev (RUS)	Marcus Blaze (USA)

== Lightweight ==
- 67 kg: 1951–1961
- 70 kg: 1962–1967
- 68 kg: 1969–1995
- 69 kg: 1997–2001
- 66 kg: 2002–2013
- 65 kg: 2014–

Games	Gold	Silver	Bronze
1951 Helsinki	Olle Anderberg (SWE)	Garibaldo Nizzola (ITA)	İbrahim Zengin (TUR)
1954 Tokyo	Tofigh Jahanbakht (IRN)	Olle Anderberg (SWE)	Sergey Gabaraev (URS)
1957 Istanbul	Alimbeg Bestaev (URS)	Hayrullah Şahinkaya (TUR)	Kazuo Abe (JPN)
1959 Tehran	Vladimir Sinyavsky (URS)	Enyu Valchev (BUL)	Hayrullah Şahinkaya (TUR)
1961 Yokohama	Mohammad Ali Sanatkaran (IRN)	Vladimir Sinyavsky (URS)	Udey Chand (IND)
1962 Toledo	Enyu Valchev (BUL)	Robert Dzhgamadze (URS)	Osvaldo Ferrari (ITA)
1963 Sofia	Iwao Horiuchi (JPN)	Zarbeg Beriashvili (URS)	Gregory Ruth (USA)
1965 Manchester	Abdollah Movahed (IRN)	Mahmut Atalay (TUR)	Zarbeg Beriashvili (URS)
1966 Toledo	Abdollah Movahed (IRN)	Iwao Horiuchi (JPN)	Seyit Ahmet Ağralı (TUR)
1967 New Delhi	Abdollah Movahed (IRN)	Zarbeg Beriashvili (URS)	Enyu Valchev (BUL)
1969 Mar del Plata	Abdollah Movahed (IRN)	Enyu Valchev (BUL)	Nodar Khokhashvili (URS)
1970 Edmonton	Abdollah Movahed (IRN)	Ismail Yuseinov (BUL)	Bobby Douglas (USA)
1971 Sofia	Dan Gable (USA)	Vasily Kazakhov (URS)	Ismail Yuseinov (BUL)
1973 Tehran	Lloyd Keaser (USA)	Nasrula Nasrulaev (URS)	János Kocsis (HUN)
1974 Istanbul	Nasrula Nasrulaev (URS)	Yasaburo Sugawara (JPN)	Tsedendambyn Natsagdorj (MGL)
1975 Minsk	Pavel Pinigin (URS)	Tsedendambyn Natsagdorj (MGL)	Ismail Yuseinov (BUL)
1977 Lausanne	Pavel Pinigin (URS)	Šaban Sejdiu (YUG)	Zevegiin Oidov (MGL)
1978 Mexico City	Pavel Pinigin (URS)	Akira Miyahara (JPN)	Ivan Yankov (BUL)
1979 San Diego	Mikhail Kharachura (URS)	Akira Miyahara (JPN)	Eberhard Probst (GDR)
1981 Skopje	Saypulla Absaidov (URS)	Šaban Sejdiu (YUG)	Kamen Penev (BUL)
1982 Edmonton	Mikhail Kharachura (URS)	Raúl Cascaret (CUB)	Eberhard Probst (GDR)
1983 Kyiv	Arsen Fadzaev (URS)	Buyandelgeriin Bold (MGL)	Kamen Penev (BUL)
1985 Budapest	Arsen Fadzaev (URS)	Buyandelgeriin Bold (MGL)	Pat Sullivan (CAN)
1986 Budapest	Arsen Fadzaev (URS)	Andre Metzger (USA)	Simeon Shterev (BUL)
1987 Clermont-Ferrand	Arsen Fadzaev (URS)	Georgios Athanasiadis (GRE)	Andre Metzger (USA)
1989 Martigny	Boris Budaev (URS)	Kosei Akaishi (JPN)	Ahmet Çakıcı (FRG)
1990 Tokyo	Arsen Fadzaev (URS)	Georgios Athanasiadis (GRE)	Jesús Rodríguez (CUB)
1991 Varna	Arsen Fadzaev (URS)	Chris Wilson (CAN)	Valentin Getsov (BUL)
1993 Toronto	Akbar Fallah (IRI)	Vadim Bogiev (RUS)	Chris Wilson (CAN)
1994 Istanbul	Alexander Leipold (GER)	Jesús Rodríguez (CUB)	Kenjebek Omuraliev (KGZ)
1995 Atlanta	Arayik Gevorgyan (ARM)	Akbar Fallah (IRI)	Jesús Rodríguez (CUB)
1997 Krasnoyarsk	Arayik Gevorgyan (ARM)	Hwang Sang-ho (KOR)	Zaza Zazirov (UKR)
1998 Tehran	Arayik Gevorgyan (ARM)	Zaza Zazirov (UKR)	Lincoln McIlravy (USA)
1999 Ankara	Daniel Igali (CAN)	Lincoln McIlravy (USA)	Yüksel Şanlı (TUR)
2001 Sofia	Nikolay Paslar (BUL)	Amir Tavakkolian (IRI)	Jang Jae-sung (KOR)
2002 Tehran	Elbrus Tedeyev (UKR)	Alireza Dabir (IRI)	Zaur Botaev (RUS)
2003 New York City	Irbek Farniev (RUS)	Serafim Barzakov (BUL)	Kazuhiko Ikematsu (JPN)
2005 Budapest	Makhach Murtazaliev (RUS)	Serafim Barzakov (BUL)	Geandry Garzón (CUB)
2005 Budapest	Makhach Murtazaliev (RUS)	Serafim Barzakov (BUL)	Otar Tushishvili (GEO)
2006 Guangzhou	Bill Zadick (USA)	Otar Tushishvili (GEO)	Geandry Garzón (CUB)
2006 Guangzhou	Bill Zadick (USA)	Otar Tushishvili (GEO)	Andriy Stadnik (UKR)
2007 Baku	Ramazan Şahin (TUR)	Geandry Garzón (CUB)	Otar Tushishvili (GEO)
2007 Baku	Ramazan Şahin (TUR)	Geandry Garzón (CUB)	Irbek Farniev (RUS)
2009 Herning	Mehdi Taghavi (IRI)	Rasul Dzhukaev (RUS)	Tatsuhiro Yonemitsu (JPN)
2009 Herning	Mehdi Taghavi (IRI)	Rasul Dzhukaev (RUS)	Leonid Spiridonov (KAZ)
2010 Moscow	Sushil Kumar (IND)	Alan Gogaev (RUS)	Jabrayil Hasanov (AZE)
2010 Moscow	Sushil Kumar (IND)	Alan Gogaev (RUS)	Geandry Garzón (CUB)
2011 Istanbul	Mehdi Taghavi (IRI)	Tatsuhiro Yonemitsu (JPN)	Jabrayil Hasanov (AZE)
2011 Istanbul	Mehdi Taghavi (IRI)	Tatsuhiro Yonemitsu (JPN)	Liván López (CUB)
2013 Budapest	David Safaryan (ARM)	Liván López (CUB)	Ganzorigiin Mandakhnaran (MGL)
2013 Budapest	David Safaryan (ARM)	Liván López (CUB)	Magomed Kurbanaliev (RUS)
2014 Tashkent	Soslan Ramonov (RUS)	Ahmad Mohammadi (IRI)	Mihail Sava (MDA)
2014 Tashkent	Soslan Ramonov (RUS)	Ahmad Mohammadi (IRI)	Ganzorigiin Mandakhnaran (MGL)
2015 Las Vegas	Frank Chamizo (ITA)	Ikhtiyor Navruzov (UZB)	Ahmad Mohammadi (IRI)
2015 Las Vegas	Frank Chamizo (ITA)	Ikhtiyor Navruzov (UZB)	Soslan Ramonov (RUS)
2017 Paris	Zurabi Iakobishvili (GEO)	Magomedmurad Gadzhiev (POL)	Alejandro Valdés (CUB)
2017 Paris	Zurabi Iakobishvili (GEO)	Magomedmurad Gadzhiev (POL)	Alan Gogaev (RUS)
2018 Budapest	Takuto Otoguro (JPN)	Bajrang Punia (IND)	Alejandro Valdés (CUB)
2018 Budapest	Takuto Otoguro (JPN)	Bajrang Punia (IND)	Akhmed Chakaev (RUS)
2019 Nur-Sultan	Gadzhimurad Rashidov (RUS)	Daulet Niyazbekov (KAZ)	Iszmail Muszukajev (HUN)
2019 Nur-Sultan	Gadzhimurad Rashidov (RUS)	Daulet Niyazbekov (KAZ)	Bajrang Punia (IND)
2021 Oslo	Zagir Shakhiev (RWF)	Amir Mohammad Yazdani (IRI)	Alibek Osmonov (KGZ)
2021 Oslo	Zagir Shakhiev (RWF)	Amir Mohammad Yazdani (IRI)	Tömör-Ochiryn Tulga (MGL)
2022 Belgrade	Rahman Amouzad (IRI)	Yianni Diakomihalis (USA)	Iszmail Muszukajev (HUN)
2022 Belgrade	Rahman Amouzad (IRI)	Yianni Diakomihalis (USA)	Bajrang Punia (IND)
2023 Belgrade	Iszmail Muszukajev (HUN)	Sebastian Rivera (PUR)	Shamil Mamedov (AIN)
2023 Belgrade	Iszmail Muszukajev (HUN)	Sebastian Rivera (PUR)	Vazgen Tevanyan (ARM)
2025 Zagreb	Rahman Amouzad (IRI)	Kotaro Kiyooka (JPN)	Real Woods (USA)
2025 Zagreb	Rahman Amouzad (IRI)	Kotaro Kiyooka (JPN)	Umidjon Jalolov (UZB)
2026 Astana	Bo Bassett (USA)	Vazgen Tevanyan (ARM)	Rahman Amouzad (IRI)
2026 Astana	Bo Bassett (USA)	Vazgen Tevanyan (ARM)	Abasgadzhi Magomedov (RUS)

== Light welterweight ==
- 70 kg: 2014–

Games	Gold	Silver	Bronze
2014 Tashkent	Khetag Tsabolov (RUS)	Yakup Gör (TUR)	Ali Shabanau (BLR)
2014 Tashkent	Khetag Tsabolov (RUS)	Yakup Gör (TUR)	Bekzod Abdurakhmonov (UZB)
2015 Las Vegas	Magomedrasul Gazimagomedov (RUS)	Hassan Yazdani (IRI)	Yakup Gör (TUR)
2015 Las Vegas	Magomedrasul Gazimagomedov (RUS)	Hassan Yazdani (IRI)	James Green (USA)
2016 Budapest	Magomed Kurbanaliev (RUS)	Nurlan Bekzhanov (KAZ)	Mostafa Hosseinkhani (IRI)
2016 Budapest	Magomed Kurbanaliev (RUS)	Nurlan Bekzhanov (KAZ)	Elaman Dogdurbek Uulu (KGZ)
2017 Paris	Frank Chamizo (ITA)	James Green (USA)	Yuhi Fujinami (JPN)
2017 Paris	Frank Chamizo (ITA)	James Green (USA)	Akzhurek Tanatarov (KAZ)
2018 Budapest	Magomedrasul Gazimagomedov (RUS)	Adam Batirov (BRN)	Franklin Marén (CUB)
2018 Budapest	Magomedrasul Gazimagomedov (RUS)	Adam Batirov (BRN)	Zurabi Iakobishvili (GEO)
2019 Nur-Sultan	David Baev (RUS)	Nurkozha Kaipanov (KAZ)	Younes Emami (IRI)
2019 Nur-Sultan	David Baev (RUS)	Nurkozha Kaipanov (KAZ)	Magomedmurad Gadzhiev (POL)
2021 Oslo	Magomedmurad Gadzhiev (POL)	Ernazar Akmataliev (KGZ)	Zurabi Iakobishvili (GEO)
2021 Oslo	Magomedmurad Gadzhiev (POL)	Ernazar Akmataliev (KGZ)	Yevgeny Zherbaev (RWF)
2022 Belgrade	Taishi Narikuni (JPN)	Zain Retherford (USA)	Zurabi Iakobishvili (GEO)
2022 Belgrade	Taishi Narikuni (JPN)	Zain Retherford (USA)	Ernazar Akmataliev (KGZ)
2023 Belgrade	Zain Retherford (USA)	Amir Mohammad Yazdani (IRI)	Arman Andreasyan (ARM)
2023 Belgrade	Zain Retherford (USA)	Amir Mohammad Yazdani (IRI)	Ramazan Ramazanov (BUL)
2024 Tirana	Nurkozha Kaipanov (KAZ)	Yoshinosuke Aoyagi (JPN)	Inalbek Sheriev (AIN)
2024 Tirana	Nurkozha Kaipanov (KAZ)	Yoshinosuke Aoyagi (JPN)	Abdulmazhid Kudiev (TJK)
2025 Zagreb	Yoshinosuke Aoyagi (JPN)	Tömör-Ochiryn Tulga (MGL)	Nurkozha Kaipanov (KAZ)
2025 Zagreb	Yoshinosuke Aoyagi (JPN)	Tömör-Ochiryn Tulga (MGL)	Ernazar Akmataliev (KGZ)
2026 Astana	Ibragim Ibragimov (RUS)	Ernazar Akmataliev (KGZ)	Tömör-Ochiryn Tulga (MGL)
2026 Astana	Ibragim Ibragimov (RUS)	Ernazar Akmataliev (KGZ)	Zain Retherford (USA)

== Welterweight ==
- 73 kg: 1951–1961
- 78 kg: 1962–1967
- 74 kg: 1969–1995
- 76 kg: 1997–2001
- 74 kg: 2002–

Games	Gold	Silver	Bronze
1951 Helsinki	Celal Atik (TUR)	Aleksanteri Keisala (FIN)	Abdollah Mojtabavi (IRN)
1954 Tokyo	Vakhtang Balavadze (URS)	Mohammad Ali Fardin (IRN)	Yutaka Kaneko (JPN)
1957 Istanbul	Vakhtang Balavadze (URS)	İsmail Ogan (TUR)	Murtaza Murtazov (BUL)
1959 Tehran	Emam-Ali Habibi (IRN)	Vakhtang Balavadze (URS)	İsmail Ogan (TUR)
1961 Yokohama	Emam-Ali Habibi (IRN)	Mikhail Bekmurzov (URS)	Yutaka Kaneko (JPN)
1962 Toledo	Emam-Ali Habibi (IRN)	Petko Dermendzhiev (BUL)	James Ferguson (USA)
1963 Sofia	Guram Sagaradze (URS)	Petko Dermendzhiev (BUL)	İsmail Ogan (TUR)
1965 Manchester	Guram Sagaradze (URS)	Mohammad Ali Sanatkaran (IRN)	Yasuo Watanabe (JPN)
1966 Toledo	Mahmut Atalay (TUR)	Guram Sagaradze (URS)	Hossein Tahami (IRN)
1967 New Delhi	Daniel Robin (FRA)	Guram Sagaradze (URS)	Tatsuo Sasaki (JPN)
1969 Mar del Plata	Zarbeg Beriashvili (URS)	Wayne Wells (USA)	Seiji Yamagata (JPN)
1970 Edmonton	Wayne Wells (USA)	Mohammad Farhangdoust (IRN)	Danzandarjaagiin Sereeter (MGL)
1971 Sofia	Yury Gusov (URS)	Mohammad Farhangdoust (IRN)	Ludovic Ambruș (ROM)
1973 Tehran	Mansour Barzegar (IRN)	Ruslan Ashuraliev (URS)	Jan Karlsson (SWE)
1974 Istanbul	Ruslan Ashuraliev (URS)	Yancho Pavlov (BUL)	Victor Zilberman (ISR)
1975 Minsk	Ruslan Ashuraliev (URS)	Mansour Barzegar (IRN)	Jiichiro Date (JPN)
1977 Lausanne	Stanley Dziedzic (USA)	Mansour Barzegar (IRN)	Aleksandar Nanev (BUL)
1978 Mexico City	Leroy Kemp (USA)	Mohammad Hossein Mohebbi (IRN)	Petru Marta (URS)
1979 San Diego	Leroy Kemp (USA)	Martin Knosp (FRG)	Nikolay Petrenko (URS)
1981 Skopje	Martin Knosp (FRG)	Valentin Raychev (BUL)	Leroy Kemp (USA)
1982 Edmonton	Leroy Kemp (USA)	Dan Karabin (TCH)	Yury Vorobiev (URS)
1983 Kyiv	Dave Schultz (USA)	Taram Magomadov (URS)	Martin Knosp (FRG)
1985 Budapest	Raúl Cascaret (CUB)	Dave Schultz (USA)	Luvsangiin Enkhbayar (MGL)
1986 Budapest	Raúl Cascaret (CUB)	Adlan Varaev (URS)	Dave Schultz (USA)
1987 Clermont-Ferrand	Adlan Varaev (URS)	Dave Schultz (USA)	Uwe Westendorf (GDR)
1989 Martigny	Kenny Monday (USA)	Arsen Fadzaev (URS)	Lodoin Erkhbayar (MGL)
1990 Tokyo	Rahmat Sofiadi (BUL)	Nasir Gadzhikhanov (URS)	Amir Reza Khadem (IRN)
1991 Varna	Amir Reza Khadem (IRN)	Kenny Monday (USA)	Nasir Gadzhikhanov (URS)
1993 Toronto	Park Jang-soon (KOR)	Dave Schultz (USA)	Alberto Rodríguez (CUB)
1994 Istanbul	Turan Ceylan (TUR)	Victor Peicov (MLD)	Behrouz Yari (IRI)
1995 Atlanta	Buvaisar Saitiev (RUS)	Alexander Leipold (GER)	Alberto Rodríguez (CUB)
1997 Krasnoyarsk	Buvaisar Saitiev (RUS)	Alexander Leipold (GER)	Miroslav Gochev (BUL)
1998 Tehran	Buvaisar Saitiev (RUS)	Moon Eui-jae (KOR)	Alexander Leipold (GER)
1999 Ankara	Adam Saitiev (RUS)	Alexander Leipold (GER)	Adem Bereket (TUR)
2001 Sofia	Buvaisar Saitiev (RUS)	Moon Eui-jae (KOR)	Joe Williams (USA)
2002 Tehran	Mehdi Hajizadeh (IRI)	Magomed Isagadzhiev (RUS)	Volodymyr Syrotyn (UKR)
2003 New York City	Buvaisar Saitiev (RUS)	Murad Gaidarov (BLR)	Gennadiy Laliyev (KAZ)
2005 Budapest	Buvaisar Saitiev (RUS)	Árpád Ritter (HUN)	Nikolay Paslar (BUL)
2005 Budapest	Buvaisar Saitiev (RUS)	Árpád Ritter (HUN)	Joe Williams (USA)
2006 Guangzhou	Ibragim Aldatov (UKR)	Ali Asghar Bazri (IRI)	Donny Pritzlaff (USA)
2006 Guangzhou	Ibragim Aldatov (UKR)	Ali Asghar Bazri (IRI)	Soslan Tigiev (UZB)
2007 Baku	Makhach Murtazaliev (RUS)	Ibragim Aldatov (UKR)	Chamsulvara Chamsulvarayev (AZE)
2007 Baku	Makhach Murtazaliev (RUS)	Ibragim Aldatov (UKR)	Iván Fundora (CUB)
2009 Herning	Denis Tsargush (RUS)	Chamsulvara Chamsulvarayev (AZE)	Ramesh Kumar (IND)
2009 Herning	Denis Tsargush (RUS)	Chamsulvara Chamsulvarayev (AZE)	Sadegh Goudarzi (IRI)
2010 Moscow	Denis Tsargush (RUS)	Sadegh Goudarzi (IRI)	Gábor Hatos (HUN)
2010 Moscow	Denis Tsargush (RUS)	Sadegh Goudarzi (IRI)	Abdulkhakim Shapiyev (KAZ)
2011 Istanbul	Jordan Burroughs (USA)	Sadegh Goudarzi (IRI)	Ashraf Aliyev (AZE)
2011 Istanbul	Jordan Burroughs (USA)	Sadegh Goudarzi (IRI)	Davit Khutsishvili (GEO)
2013 Budapest	Jordan Burroughs (USA)	Ezzatollah Akbari (IRI)	Ali Shabanau (BLR)
2013 Budapest	Jordan Burroughs (USA)	Ezzatollah Akbari (IRI)	Rashid Kurbanov (UZB)
2014 Tashkent	Denis Tsargush (RUS)	Sosuke Takatani (JPN)	Liván López (CUB)
2014 Tashkent	Denis Tsargush (RUS)	Sosuke Takatani (JPN)	Jordan Burroughs (USA)
2015 Las Vegas	Jordan Burroughs (USA)	Pürevjavyn Önörbat (MGL)	Narsingh Yadav (IND)
2015 Las Vegas	Jordan Burroughs (USA)	Pürevjavyn Önörbat (MGL)	Aniuar Geduev (RUS)
2017 Paris	Jordan Burroughs (USA)	Khetag Tsabolov (RUS)	Ali Shabanau (BLR)
2017 Paris	Jordan Burroughs (USA)	Khetag Tsabolov (RUS)	Soner Demirtaş (TUR)
2018 Budapest	Zaurbek Sidakov (RUS)	Avtandil Kentchadze (GEO)	Jordan Burroughs (USA)
2018 Budapest	Zaurbek Sidakov (RUS)	Avtandil Kentchadze (GEO)	Bekzod Abdurakhmonov (UZB)
2019 Nur-Sultan	Zaurbek Sidakov (RUS)	Frank Chamizo (ITA)	Daniyar Kaisanov (KAZ)
2019 Nur-Sultan	Zaurbek Sidakov (RUS)	Frank Chamizo (ITA)	Jordan Burroughs (USA)
2021 Oslo	Kyle Dake (USA)	Tajmuraz Salkazanov (SVK)	Timur Bizhoev (RWF)
2021 Oslo	Kyle Dake (USA)	Tajmuraz Salkazanov (SVK)	Fazlı Eryılmaz (TUR)
2022 Belgrade	Kyle Dake (USA)	Tajmuraz Salkazanov (SVK)	Younes Emami (IRI)
2022 Belgrade	Kyle Dake (USA)	Tajmuraz Salkazanov (SVK)	Soner Demirtaş (TUR)
2023 Belgrade	Zaurbek Sidakov (AIN)	Kyle Dake (USA)	Daichi Takatani (JPN)
2023 Belgrade	Zaurbek Sidakov (AIN)	Kyle Dake (USA)	Khetag Tsabolov (SRB)
2025 Zagreb	Kota Takahashi (JPN)	Chermen Valiev (ALB)	Tajmuraz Salkazanov (SVK)
2025 Zagreb	Kota Takahashi (JPN)	Chermen Valiev (ALB)	Zaurbek Sidakov (UWW)
2026 Astana	Inalbek Sheriev (RUS)	Nurkozha Kaipanov (KAZ)	Amir Mohammad Yazdani (IRI)
2026 Astana	Inalbek Sheriev (RUS)	Nurkozha Kaipanov (KAZ)	Yoshinosuke Aoyagi (JPN)

== Light middleweight ==
- 79 kg: 2018–

Games	Gold	Silver	Bronze
2018 Budapest	Kyle Dake (USA)	Jabrayil Hasanov (AZE)	Ali Shabanau (BLR)
2018 Budapest	Kyle Dake (USA)	Jabrayil Hasanov (AZE)	Akhmed Gadzhimagomedov (RUS)
2019 Nur-Sultan	Kyle Dake (USA)	Jabrayil Hasanov (AZE)	Gadzhi Nabiev (RUS)
2019 Nur-Sultan	Kyle Dake (USA)	Jabrayil Hasanov (AZE)	Tajmuraz Salkazanov (SVK)
2021 Oslo	Jordan Burroughs (USA)	Mohammad Nokhodi (IRI)	Nika Kentchadze (GEO)
2021 Oslo	Jordan Burroughs (USA)	Mohammad Nokhodi (IRI)	Radik Valiev (RWF)
2022 Belgrade	Jordan Burroughs (USA)	Mohammad Nokhodi (IRI)	Arsalan Budazhapov (KGZ)
2022 Belgrade	Jordan Burroughs (USA)	Mohammad Nokhodi (IRI)	Vasyl Mykhailov (UKR)
2023 Belgrade	Akhmed Usmanov (AIN)	Vladimeri Gamkrelidze (GEO)	Mohammad Nokhodi (IRI)
2023 Belgrade	Akhmed Usmanov (AIN)	Vladimeri Gamkrelidze (GEO)	Vasyl Mykhailov (UKR)
2024 Tirana	Magomed Magomaev (AIN)	Mohammad Nokhodi (IRI)	Kota Takahashi (JPN)
2024 Tirana	Magomed Magomaev (AIN)	Mohammad Nokhodi (IRI)	Achsarbek Gulajev (SVK)
2025 Zagreb	Georgios Kougioumtsidis (GRE)	Levi Haines (USA)	Khidir Saipudinov (BRN)
2025 Zagreb	Georgios Kougioumtsidis (GRE)	Levi Haines (USA)	Mohammad Nokhodi (IRI)
2026 Astana	Levi Haines (USA)	Mohammad Nokhodi (IRI)	Mahamedkhabib Kadzimahamedau (BLR)
2026 Astana	Levi Haines (USA)	Mohammad Nokhodi (IRI)	Ismail Khaniev (RUS)

== Middleweight ==
- 79 kg: 1951–1961
- 87 kg: 1962–1967
- 82 kg: 1969–1995
- 85 kg: 1997–2001
- 84 kg: 2002–2013
- 86 kg: 2014–

Games	Gold	Silver	Bronze
1951 Helsinki	Haydar Zafer (TUR)	Gholamreza Takhti (IRN)	Göte Ekström (SWE)
1954 Tokyo	Abbas Zandi (IRN)	İsmet Atlı (TUR)	Kazuo Katsuramoto (JPN)
1957 Istanbul	Nabi Sorouri (IRN)	Georgy Skhirtladze (URS)	Hasan Güngör (TUR)
1959 Tehran	Georgy Skhirtladze (URS)	Géza Hollósi (HUN)	Lothar Lippa (GDR)
1961 Yokohama	Mansour Mehdizadeh (IRN)	Géza Hollósi (HUN)	Hans Antonsson (SWE)
1962 Toledo	Mansour Mehdizadeh (IRN)	Hasan Güngör (TUR)	Shunichi Kawano (JPN)
1963 Sofia	Prodan Gardzhev (BUL)	Anatoly Albul (URS)	Mansour Mehdizadeh (IRN)
1965 Manchester	Mansour Mehdizadeh (IRN)	Francisc Balla (ROM)	Prodan Gardzhev (BUL)
1966 Toledo	Prodan Gardzhev (BUL)	Hasan Güngör (TUR)	Josef Urban (TCH)
1967 New Delhi	Boris Gurevich (URS)	Francisc Balla (ROM)	Jigjidiin Mönkhbat (MGL)
1969 Mar del Plata	Fred Fozzard (USA)	None awarded	None awarded
1970 Edmonton	Yury Shakhmuradov (URS)	Tatsuo Sasaki (JPN)	Vasile Iorga (ROM)
1971 Sofia	Levan Tediashvili (URS)	Horst Stottmeister (GDR)	Vasile Iorga (ROM)
1973 Tehran	Vasily Syulshin (URS)	Vasile Iorga (ROM)	Ismail Abilov (BUL)
1974 Istanbul	Viktor Novozhilov (URS)	Mehmet Uzun (TUR)	Vasile Iorga (ROM)
1975 Minsk	Adolf Seger (FRG)	Ismail Abilov (BUL)	Vasile Iorga (ROM)
1977 Lausanne	Adolf Seger (FRG)	Magomedkhan Aratsilov (URS)	István Kovács (HUN)
1978 Mexico City	Magomedkhan Aratsilov (URS)	Adolf Seger (FRG)	John Peterson (USA)
1979 San Diego	István Kovács (HUN)	John Peterson (USA)	Magomedkhan Aratsilov (URS)
1981 Skopje	Chris Campbell (USA)	Efraim Kamberov (BUL)	Grigory Danko (URS)
1982 Edmonton	Taymuraz Dzgoev (URS)	Efraim Kamberov (BUL)	Dave Schultz (USA)
1983 Kyiv	Taymuraz Dzgoev (URS)	Zevegiin Düvchin (MGL)	Efraim Kamberov (BUL)
1985 Budapest	Mark Schultz (USA)	Aleksandar Nanev (BUL)	Aleksandr Tambovtsev (URS)
1986 Budapest	Vladimir Modosyan (URS)	Aleksandar Nanev (BUL)	Jozef Lohyňa (TCH)
1987 Clermont-Ferrand	Mark Schultz (USA)	Aleksandar Nanev (BUL)	Vladimir Modosyan (URS)
1989 Martigny	Elmadi Zhabrailov (URS)	Melvin Douglas (USA)	Alcide Legrand (FRA)
1990 Tokyo	Jozef Lohyňa (TCH)	Royce Alger (USA)	Puntsagiin Sükhbat (MGL)
1991 Varna	Kevin Jackson (USA)	Jozef Lohyňa (TCH)	Sebahattin Öztürk (TUR)
1993 Toronto	Sebahattin Öztürk (TUR)	Sagid Katinovasov (RUS)	Ruslan Khinchagov (UZB)
1994 Istanbul	Lukman Zhabrailov (MLD)	Sebahattin Öztürk (TUR)	Hans Gstöttner (GER)
1995 Atlanta	Kevin Jackson (USA)	Elmadi Zhabrailov (KAZ)	Ruslan Khinchagov (UZB)
1997 Krasnoyarsk	Les Gutches (USA)	Eldar Assanov (UKR)	Alireza Heidari (IRI)
1998 Tehran	Alireza Heidari (IRI)	Magomed Ibragimov (MKD)	Yoel Romero (CUB)
1999 Ankara	Yoel Romero (CUB)	Khadzhimurad Magomedov (RUS)	Les Gutches (USA)
2001 Sofia	Khadzhimurad Magomedov (RUS)	Brandon Eggum (USA)	Yoel Romero (CUB)
2002 Tehran	Adam Saitiev (RUS)	Yoel Romero (CUB)	Majid Khodaei (IRI)
2003 New York City	Sazhid Sazhidov (RUS)	Cael Sanderson (USA)	Revaz Mindorashvili (GEO)
2005 Budapest	Revaz Mindorashvili (GEO)	Yoel Romero (CUB)	Magomed Kurugliyev (KAZ)
2005 Budapest	Revaz Mindorashvili (GEO)	Yoel Romero (CUB)	Taras Danko (UKR)
2006 Guangzhou	Sazhid Sazhidov (RUS)	Revaz Mindorashvili (GEO)	Reza Yazdani (IRI)
2006 Guangzhou	Sazhid Sazhidov (RUS)	Revaz Mindorashvili (GEO)	Zaurbek Sokhiev (UZB)
2007 Baku	Georgy Ketoev (RUS)	Yusup Abdusalomov (TJK)	Reza Yazdani (IRI)
2007 Baku	Georgy Ketoev (RUS)	Yusup Abdusalomov (TJK)	Zaurbek Sokhiev (UZB)
2009 Herning	Zaurbek Sokhiev (UZB)	Jake Herbert (USA)	Sharif Sharifov (AZE)
2009 Herning	Zaurbek Sokhiev (UZB)	Jake Herbert (USA)	Ibragim Aldatov (UKR)
2010 Moscow	Mihail Ganev (BUL)	Zaurbek Sokhiev (UZB)	Reineris Salas (CUB)
2010 Moscow	Mihail Ganev (BUL)	Zaurbek Sokhiev (UZB)	Soslan Ktsoev (RUS)
2011 Istanbul	Sharif Sharifov (AZE)	Ibragim Aldatov (UKR)	Dato Marsagishvili (GEO)
2011 Istanbul	Sharif Sharifov (AZE)	Ibragim Aldatov (UKR)	Albert Saritov (RUS)
2013 Budapest	Ibragim Aldatov (UKR)	Reineris Salas (CUB)	István Veréb (HUN)
2013 Budapest	Ibragim Aldatov (UKR)	Reineris Salas (CUB)	Ehsan Lashgari (IRI)
2014 Tashkent	Abdulrashid Sadulaev (RUS)	Reineris Salas (CUB)	Mohammad Hossein Mohammadian (IRI)
2014 Tashkent	Abdulrashid Sadulaev (RUS)	Reineris Salas (CUB)	Selim Yaşar (TUR)
2015 Las Vegas	Abdulrashid Sadulaev (RUS)	Selim Yaşar (TUR)	Sandro Aminashvili (GEO)
2015 Las Vegas	Abdulrashid Sadulaev (RUS)	Selim Yaşar (TUR)	Alireza Karimi (IRI)
2017 Paris	Hassan Yazdani (IRI)	Boris Makoev (SVK)	Vladislav Valiev (RUS)
2017 Paris	Hassan Yazdani (IRI)	Boris Makoev (SVK)	J'den Cox (USA)
2018 Budapest	David Taylor (USA)	Fatih Erdin (TUR)	Taimuraz Friev (ESP)
2018 Budapest	David Taylor (USA)	Fatih Erdin (TUR)	Hassan Yazdani (IRI)
2019 Nur-Sultan	Hassan Yazdani (IRI)	Deepak Punia (IND)	Artur Naifonov (RUS)
2019 Nur-Sultan	Hassan Yazdani (IRI)	Deepak Punia (IND)	Stefan Reichmuth (SUI)
2021 Oslo	Hassan Yazdani (IRI)	David Taylor (USA)	Abubakr Abakarov (AZE)
2021 Oslo	Hassan Yazdani (IRI)	David Taylor (USA)	Artur Naifonov (RWF)
2022 Belgrade	David Taylor (USA)	Hassan Yazdani (IRI)	Azamat Dauletbekov (KAZ)
2022 Belgrade	David Taylor (USA)	Hassan Yazdani (IRI)	Boris Makoev (SVK)
2023 Belgrade	David Taylor (USA)	Hassan Yazdani (IRI)	Azamat Dauletbekov (KAZ)
2023 Belgrade	David Taylor (USA)	Hassan Yazdani (IRI)	Myles Amine (SMR)
2025 Zagreb	Zahid Valencia (USA)	Hayato Ishiguro (JPN)	Arsenii Dzhioev (AZE)
2025 Zagreb	Zahid Valencia (USA)	Hayato Ishiguro (JPN)	Kamran Ghasempour (IRI)
2026 Astana	Kyle Dake (USA)	Arsenii Dzhioev (AZE)	Vladimeri Gamkrelidze (GEO)
2026 Astana	Kyle Dake (USA)	Arsenii Dzhioev (AZE)	Malik Shavaev (KGZ)

== Light heavyweight ==
- 87 kg: 1951–1961
- 97 kg: 1962–1967
- 90 kg: 1969–1995
- 92 kg: 2018–

Games	Gold	Silver	Bronze
1951 Helsinki	Yaşar Doğu (TUR)	Viking Palm (SWE)	Max Leichter (FRG)
1954 Tokyo	August Englas (URS)	Adil Atan (TUR)	Viking Palm (SWE)
1957 Istanbul	Petko Sirakov (BUL)	Boris Kulaev (URS)	İsmet Atlı (TUR)
1959 Tehran	Gholamreza Takhti (IRN)	Petko Sirakov (BUL)	Maurice Jacquel (FRA)
1961 Yokohama	Gholamreza Takhti (IRN)	Boris Gurevich (URS)	Hasan Güngör (TUR)
1962 Toledo	Aleksandr Medved (URS)	Gholamreza Takhti (IRN)	Daniel Brand (USA)
1963 Sofia	Aleksandr Medved (URS)	Valko Kostov (BUL)	Hamit Kaplan (TUR)
1965 Manchester	Ahmet Ayık (TUR)	Aleksandr Medved (URS)	Said Mustafov (BUL)
1966 Toledo	Aleksandr Medved (URS)	Ahmet Ayık (TUR)	Said Mustafov (BUL)
1967 New Delhi	Ahmet Ayık (TUR)	Shota Lomidze (URS)	Said Mustafov (BUL)
1969 Mar del Plata	Boris Gurevich (URS)	Rusi Petrov (BUL)	Henk Schenk (USA)
1970 Edmonton	Gennady Strakhov (URS)	Bill Harlow (USA)	Makoto Kamada (JPN)
1971 Sofia	Rusi Petrov (BUL)	Paweł Kurczewski (POL)	Russ Hellickson (USA)
1973 Tehran	Levan Tediashvili (URS)	Horst Stottmeister (GDR)	Ben Peterson (USA)
1974 Istanbul	Levan Tediashvili (URS)	Ismail Abilov (BUL)	Mehmet Güçlü (TUR)
1975 Minsk	Levan Tediashvili (URS)	Horst Stottmeister (GDR)	Shukri Ahmedov (BUL)
1977 Lausanne	Anatoly Prokopchuk (URS)	Uwe Neupert (GDR)	Shukri Ahmedov (BUL)
1978 Mexico City	Uwe Neupert (GDR)	Anatoly Prokopchuk (URS)	İsmail Temiz (TUR)
1979 San Diego	Khasan Ortsuev (URS)	Uwe Neupert (GDR)	Ivan Ginov (BUL)
1981 Skopje	Sanasar Oganisyan (URS)	Ivan Ginov (BUL)	Uwe Neupert (GDR)
1982 Edmonton	Uwe Neupert (GDR)	Clark Davis (CAN)	Vladimir Batnia (URS)
1983 Kyiv	Piotr Naniev (URS)	Ivan Ginov (BUL)	Uwe Neupert (GDR)
1985 Budapest	Bill Scherr (USA)	Roland Dudziak (GDR)	Kamen Tomov (BUL)
1986 Budapest	Makharbek Khadartsev (URS)	Torsten Wagner (GDR)	Jim Scherr (USA)
1987 Clermont-Ferrand	Makharbek Khadartsev (URS)	Jim Scherr (USA)	Jerzy Nieć (POL)
1989 Martigny	Makharbek Khadartsev (URS)	Jim Scherr (USA)	Gábor Tóth (HUN)
1990 Tokyo	Makharbek Khadartsev (URS)	Chris Campbell (USA)	Mohammad Hassan Mohebbi (IRN)
1991 Varna	Makharbek Khadartsev (URS)	Iraklis Deskoulidis (GRE)	Roberto Limonta (CUB)
1993 Toronto	Melvin Douglas (USA)	Eldar Kurtanidze (GEO)	Makharbek Khadartsev (RUS)
1994 Istanbul	Rasoul Khadem (IRI)	Makharbek Khadartsev (RUS)	Melvin Douglas (USA)
1995 Atlanta	Rasoul Khadem (IRI)	Makharbek Khadartsev (RUS)	Melvin Douglas (USA)
2018 Budapest	J'den Cox (USA)	Ivan Yankouski (BLR)	Alireza Karimi (IRI)
2018 Budapest	J'den Cox (USA)	Ivan Yankouski (BLR)	Atsushi Matsumoto (JPN)
2019 Nur-Sultan	J'den Cox (USA)	Alireza Karimi (IRI)	Irakli Mtsituri (GEO)
2019 Nur-Sultan	J'den Cox (USA)	Alireza Karimi (IRI)	Alikhan Zhabrailov (RUS)
2021 Oslo	Kamran Ghasempour (IRI)	Magomed Kurbanov (RWF)	Osman Nurmagomedov (AZE)
2021 Oslo	Kamran Ghasempour (IRI)	Magomed Kurbanov (RWF)	J'den Cox (USA)
2022 Belgrade	Kamran Ghasempour (IRI)	J'den Cox (USA)	Osman Nurmagomedov (AZE)
2022 Belgrade	Kamran Ghasempour (IRI)	J'den Cox (USA)	Miriani Maisuradze (GEO)
2023 Belgrade	Rizabek Aitmukhan (KAZ)	Osman Nurmagomedov (AZE)	Feyzullah Aktürk (TUR)
2023 Belgrade	Rizabek Aitmukhan (KAZ)	Osman Nurmagomedov (AZE)	Zahid Valencia (USA)
2024 Tirana	Abdulrashid Sadulaev (AIN)	Miriani Maisuradze (GEO)	Batyrbek Tsakulov (SVK)
2024 Tirana	Abdulrashid Sadulaev (AIN)	Miriani Maisuradze (GEO)	David Taylor (USA)
2025 Zagreb	Trent Hidlay (USA)	Amanula Gadzhimagomedov (UWW)	Osman Nurmagomedov (AZE)
2025 Zagreb	Trent Hidlay (USA)	Amanula Gadzhimagomedov (UWW)	Amir Hossein Firouzpour (IRI)
2026 Astana	Amanula Gadzhimagomedov (RUS)	Trent Hidlay (USA)	Ali Tcokaev (AZE)
2026 Astana	Amanula Gadzhimagomedov (RUS)	Trent Hidlay (USA)	Miriani Maisuradze (GEO)

== Heavyweight ==
- +87 kg: 1951–1961
- +97 kg: 1962–1967
- 100 kg: 1969–1995
- 97 kg: 1997–2001
- 96 kg: 2002–2013
- 97 kg: 2014–

Games	Gold	Silver	Bronze
1951 Helsinki	Bertil Antonsson (SWE)	Pauli Riihimäki (FIN)	Natale Vecchi (ITA)
1954 Tokyo	Arsen Mekokishvili (URS)	Bertil Antonsson (SWE)	İrfan Atan (TUR)
1957 Istanbul	Hamit Kaplan (TUR)	Wilfried Dietrich (FRG)	Husein Mehmedov (BUL)
1959 Tehran	Lyutvi Ahmedov (BUL)	Hamit Kaplan (TUR)	Savkuz Dzarasov (URS)
1961 Yokohama	Wilfried Dietrich (FRG)	Hamit Kaplan (TUR)	Aleksandr Medved (URS)
1962 Toledo	Aleksandr Ivanitsky (URS)	Lyutvi Ahmedov (BUL)	Wilfried Dietrich (FRG)
1963 Sofia	Aleksandr Ivanitsky (URS)	Lyutvi Ahmedov (BUL)	János Reznák (HUN)
1965 Manchester	Aleksandr Ivanitsky (URS)	Lyutvi Ahmedov (BUL)	Larry Kristoff (USA)
1966 Toledo	Aleksandr Ivanitsky (URS)	Larry Kristoff (USA)	Abolfazl Anvari (IRN)
1967 New Delhi	Aleksandr Medved (URS)	Osman Duraliev (BUL)	Larry Kristoff (USA)
1969 Mar del Plata	Shota Lomidze (URS)	Larry Kristoff (USA)	Vasil Todorov (BUL)
1970 Edmonton	Vladimir Gulyutkin (URS)	Larry Kristoff (USA)	Gıyasettin Yılmaz (TUR)
1971 Sofia	Shota Lomidze (URS)	Khorloogiin Bayanmönkh (MGL)	Vasil Todorov (BUL)
1973 Tehran	Ivan Yarygin (URS)	József Csatári (HUN)	Dimitar Nekov (BUL)
1974 Istanbul	Vladimir Gulyutkin (URS)	Khorloogiin Bayanmönkh (MGL)	Harald Büttner (GDR)
1975 Minsk	Khorloogiin Bayanmönkh (MGL)	Harald Büttner (GDR)	Vladimir Gulyutkin (URS)
1977 Lausanne	Aslanbek Bisultanov (URS)	Harald Büttner (GDR)	Vasile Pușcașu (ROM)
1978 Mexico City	Harald Büttner (GDR)	Levan Tediashvili (URS)	Bárbaro Morgan (CUB)
1979 San Diego	Ilya Mate (URS)	Russ Hellickson (USA)	Vasile Pușcașu (ROM)
1981 Skopje	Roland Gehrke (GDR)	Greg Gibson (USA)	Ilya Mate (URS)
1982 Edmonton	Ilya Mate (URS)	Slavcho Chervenkov (BUL)	Greg Gibson (USA)
1983 Kyiv	Aslan Khadartsev (URS)	Greg Gibson (USA)	Georgi Yanchev (BUL)
1985 Budapest	Leri Khabelov (URS)	Clark Davis (CAN)	Uwe Neupert (GDR)
1986 Budapest	Aslan Khadartsev (URS)	Bill Scherr (USA)	Georgi Yanchev (BUL)
1987 Clermont-Ferrand	Leri Khabelov (URS)	Vasile Pușcașu (ROM)	Bill Scherr (USA)
1989 Martigny	Akhmed Atavov (URS)	Bill Scherr (USA)	Uwe Neupert (GDR)
1990 Tokyo	Leri Khabelov (URS)	Stoyan Nenchev (BUL)	Kirk Trost (USA)
1991 Varna	Leri Khabelov (URS)	Mark Coleman (USA)	Heiko Balz (GER)
1993 Toronto	Leri Khabelov (RUS)	Ali Kayalı (TUR)	Heiko Balz (GER)
1994 Istanbul	Arawat Sabejew (GER)	Davud Magomedov (AZE)	David Musulbes (RUS)
1995 Atlanta	Kurt Angle (USA)	Arawat Sabejew (GER)	Abbas Jadidi (IRI)
1997 Krasnoyarsk	Kuramagomed Kuramagomedov (RUS)	Ahmet Doğu (TUR)	Eldar Kurtanidze (GEO)
1998 Tehran	Abbas Jadidi (IRI)	Marek Garmulewicz (POL)	Kuramagomed Kuramagomedov (RUS)
1999 Ankara	Sagid Murtazaliev (RUS)	Alireza Heidari (IRI)	Marek Garmulewicz (POL)
2001 Sofia	Giorgi Gogshelidze (RUS)	Krasimir Kochev (BUL)	Vadim Tasoyev (UKR)
2002 Tehran	Eldar Kurtanidze (GEO)	Alireza Heidari (IRI)	Vadim Tasoyev (UKR)
2003 New York City	Eldar Kurtanidze (GEO)	Alireza Heidari (IRI)	Krasimir Kochev (BUL)
2005 Budapest	Khadzhimurat Gatsalov (RUS)	Eldar Kurtanidze (GEO)	Aleksey Krupnyakov (KGZ)
2005 Budapest	Khadzhimurat Gatsalov (RUS)	Eldar Kurtanidze (GEO)	Vasyl Tesmynetskyi (UKR)
2006 Guangzhou	Khadzhimurat Gatsalov (RUS)	Giorgi Gogshelidze (GEO)	Ruslan Sheikhau (BLR)
2006 Guangzhou	Khadzhimurat Gatsalov (RUS)	Giorgi Gogshelidze (GEO)	Michel Batista (CUB)
2007 Baku	Khadzhimurat Gatsalov (RUS)	Saeid Ebrahimi (IRI)	Daniel Cormier (USA)
2007 Baku	Khadzhimurat Gatsalov (RUS)	Saeid Ebrahimi (IRI)	Kurban Kurbanov (UZB)
2009 Herning	Khadzhimurat Gatsalov (RUS)	Khetag Gazyumov (AZE)	Giorgi Gogshelidze (GEO)
2009 Herning	Khadzhimurat Gatsalov (RUS)	Khetag Gazyumov (AZE)	Serhat Balcı (TUR)
2010 Moscow	Khetag Gazyumov (AZE)	Khadzhimurat Gatsalov (RUS)	Ruslan Sheikhau (BLR)
2010 Moscow	Khetag Gazyumov (AZE)	Khadzhimurat Gatsalov (RUS)	Giorgi Gogshelidze (GEO)
2011 Istanbul	Reza Yazdani (IRI)	Serhat Balcı (TUR)	Ruslan Sheikhau (BLR)
2011 Istanbul	Reza Yazdani (IRI)	Serhat Balcı (TUR)	Jake Varner (USA)
2013 Budapest	Reza Yazdani (IRI)	Khetag Gazyumov (AZE)	Anzor Boltukaev (RUS)
2013 Budapest	Reza Yazdani (IRI)	Khetag Gazyumov (AZE)	Pavlo Oliynyk (UKR)
2014 Tashkent	Abdusalam Gadisov (RUS)	Khetag Gazyumov (AZE)	Javier Cortina (CUB)
2014 Tashkent	Abdusalam Gadisov (RUS)	Khetag Gazyumov (AZE)	Valeriy Andriytsev (UKR)
2015 Las Vegas	Kyle Snyder (USA)	Khetag Gazyumov (AZE)	Elizbar Odikadze (GEO)
2015 Las Vegas	Kyle Snyder (USA)	Khetag Gazyumov (AZE)	Pavlo Oliynyk (UKR)
2017 Paris	Kyle Snyder (USA)	Abdulrashid Sadulaev (RUS)	Georgy Ketoev (ARM)
2017 Paris	Kyle Snyder (USA)	Abdulrashid Sadulaev (RUS)	Aslanbek Alborov (AZE)
2018 Budapest	Abdulrashid Sadulaev (RUS)	Kyle Snyder (USA)	Elizbar Odikadze (GEO)
2018 Budapest	Abdulrashid Sadulaev (RUS)	Kyle Snyder (USA)	Abraham Conyedo (ITA)
2019 Nur-Sultan	Abdulrashid Sadulaev (RUS)	Sharif Sharifov (AZE)	Magomedgaji Nurov (MKD)
2019 Nur-Sultan	Abdulrashid Sadulaev (RUS)	Sharif Sharifov (AZE)	Kyle Snyder (USA)
2021 Oslo	Abdulrashid Sadulaev (RWF)	Kyle Snyder (USA)	Mojtaba Goleij (IRI)
2021 Oslo	Abdulrashid Sadulaev (RWF)	Kyle Snyder (USA)	Mahamed Zakariiev (UKR)
2022 Belgrade	Kyle Snyder (USA)	Batyrbek Tsakulov (SVK)	Magomedkhan Magomedov (AZE)
2022 Belgrade	Kyle Snyder (USA)	Batyrbek Tsakulov (SVK)	Givi Matcharashvili (GEO)
2023 Belgrade	Akhmed Tazhudinov (BRN)	Magomedkhan Magomedov (AZE)	Givi Matcharashvili (GEO)
2023 Belgrade	Akhmed Tazhudinov (BRN)	Magomedkhan Magomedov (AZE)	Kyle Snyder (USA)
2025 Zagreb	Kyle Snyder (USA)	Amir Ali Azarpira (IRI)	Akhmed Tazhudinov (BRN)
2025 Zagreb	Kyle Snyder (USA)	Amir Ali Azarpira (IRI)	Arash Yoshida (JPN)
2026 Astana	Kyle Snyder (USA)	Arash Yoshida (JPN)	Hassan Yazdani (IRI)
2026 Astana	Kyle Snyder (USA)	Arash Yoshida (JPN)	Abdulrashid Sadulaev (RUS)

== Super heavyweight ==
- +100 kg: 1969–1983
- 130 kg: 1985–2001
- 120 kg: 2002–2013
- 125 kg: 2014–

Games	Gold	Silver	Bronze
1969 Mar del Plata	Aleksandr Medved (URS)	Osman Duraliev (BUL)	Abolfazl Anvari (IRN)
1970 Edmonton	Aleksandr Medved (URS)	Osman Duraliev (BUL)	Peter Germer (GDR)
1971 Sofia	Aleksandr Medved (URS)	Osman Duraliev (BUL)	Stanisław Makowiecki (POL)
1973 Tehran	Soslan Andiyev (URS)	Boyan Boev (BUL)	Ladislau Șimon (ROM)
1974 Istanbul	Ladislau Șimon (ROM)	Soslan Andiyev (URS)	Boyan Boev (BUL)
1975 Minsk	Soslan Andiyev (URS)	Roland Gehrke (GDR)	Heinz Eichelbaum (FRG)
1977 Lausanne	Soslan Andiyev (URS)	Marin Gerchev (BUL)	József Balla (HUN)
1978 Mexico City	Soslan Andiyev (URS)	Reza Soukhtehsaraei (IRN)	Roland Gehrke (GDR)
1979 San Diego	Salman Khasimikov (URS)	Roland Gehrke (GDR)	Andrei Ianko (ROM)
1981 Skopje	Salman Khasimikov (URS)	Reza Soukhtehsaraei (IRN)	Adam Sandurski (POL)
1982 Edmonton	Salman Khasimikov (URS)	Adam Sandurski (POL)	Andreas Schröder (GDR)
1983 Kyiv	Salman Khasimikov (URS)	Adam Sandurski (POL)	Bruce Baumgartner (USA)
1985 Budapest	David Gobejishvili (URS)	József Balla (HUN)	Bruce Baumgartner (USA)
1986 Budapest	Bruce Baumgartner (USA)	David Gobejishvili (URS)	Andreas Schröder (GDR)
1987 Clermont-Ferrand	Aslan Khadartsev (URS)	Andreas Schröder (GDR)	Bruce Baumgartner (USA)
1989 Martigny	Alireza Soleimani (IRN)	Bruce Baumgartner (USA)	Aslan Khadartsev (URS)
1990 Tokyo	David Gobejishvili (URS)	Bruce Baumgartner (USA)	Sezgin Ayık (TUR)
1991 Varna	Andreas Schröder (GER)	Gennady Zhiltsov (URS)	Jeff Thue (CAN)
1993 Toronto	Bruce Baumgartner (USA)	Mirabi Valiyev (UKR)	Andrey Shumilin (RUS)
1994 Istanbul	Mahmut Demir (TUR)	Bruce Baumgartner (USA)	Aleksey Medvedev (BLR)
1995 Atlanta	Bruce Baumgartner (USA)	Sven Thiele (GER)	Leri Khabelov (RUS)
1997 Krasnoyarsk	Zekeriya Güçlü (TUR)	Alexis Rodríguez (CUB)	David Musulbes (RUS)
1998 Tehran	Alexis Rodríguez (CUB)	Rasoul Khadem (IRI)	Andrey Shumilin (RUS)
1999 Ankara	Stephen Neal (USA)	Andrey Shumilin (RUS)	Abbas Jadidi (IRI)
2001 Sofia	David Musulbes (RUS)	Artur Taymazov (UZB)	Alexis Rodríguez (CUB)
2002 Tehran	David Musulbes (RUS)	Alexis Rodríguez (CUB)	Aydın Polatçı (TUR)
2003 New York City	Artur Taymazov (UZB)	Kerry McCoy (USA)	Alireza Rezaei (IRI)
2005 Budapest	Aydın Polatçı (TUR)	Alexis Rodríguez (CUB)	Ottó Aubéli (HUN)
2005 Budapest	Aydın Polatçı (TUR)	Alexis Rodríguez (CUB)	Tolly Thompson (USA)
2006 Guangzhou	Artur Taymazov (UZB)	Kuramagomed Kuramagomedov (RUS)	Ruslan Basiev (ARM)
2006 Guangzhou	Artur Taymazov (UZB)	Kuramagomed Kuramagomedov (RUS)	Fardin Masoumi (IRI)
2007 Baku	Bilyal Makhov (RUS)	Alexis Rodríguez (CUB)	Vadim Tasoyev (UKR)
2007 Baku	Bilyal Makhov (RUS)	Alexis Rodríguez (CUB)	Artur Taymazov (UZB)
2009 Herning	Bilyal Makhov (RUS)	Fardin Masoumi (IRI)	Ioannis Arzoumanidis (GRE)
2009 Herning	Bilyal Makhov (RUS)	Fardin Masoumi (IRI)	Tervel Dlagnev (USA)
2010 Moscow	Bilyal Makhov (RUS)	Artur Taymazov (UZB)	Levan Berianidze (GEO)
2010 Moscow	Bilyal Makhov (RUS)	Artur Taymazov (UZB)	Ioannis Arzoumanidis (GRE)
2011 Istanbul	Aleksey Shemarov (BLR)	Bilyal Makhov (RUS)	Jamaladdin Magomedov (AZE)
2011 Istanbul	Aleksey Shemarov (BLR)	Bilyal Makhov (RUS)	Davit Modzmanashvili (GEO)
2013 Budapest	Khadzhimurat Gatsalov (RUS)	Alen Zaseyev (UKR)	Geno Petriashvili (GEO)
2013 Budapest	Khadzhimurat Gatsalov (RUS)	Alen Zaseyev (UKR)	Taha Akgül (TUR)
2014 Tashkent	Taha Akgül (TUR)	Komeil Ghasemi (IRI)	Khadzhimurat Gatsalov (RUS)
2014 Tashkent	Taha Akgül (TUR)	Komeil Ghasemi (IRI)	Tervel Dlagnev (USA)
2015 Las Vegas	Taha Akgül (TUR)	Jamaladdin Magomedov (AZE)	Levan Berianidze (ARM)
2015 Las Vegas	Taha Akgül (TUR)	Jamaladdin Magomedov (AZE)	Geno Petriashvili (GEO)
2017 Paris	Geno Petriashvili (GEO)	Taha Akgül (TUR)	Levan Berianidze (ARM)
2017 Paris	Geno Petriashvili (GEO)	Taha Akgül (TUR)	Nick Gwiazdowski (USA)
2018 Budapest	Geno Petriashvili (GEO)	Deng Zhiwei (CHN)	Parviz Hadi (IRI)
2018 Budapest	Geno Petriashvili (GEO)	Deng Zhiwei (CHN)	Nick Gwiazdowski (USA)
2019 Nur-Sultan	Geno Petriashvili (GEO)	Taha Akgül (TUR)	Deng Zhiwei (CHN)
2019 Nur-Sultan	Geno Petriashvili (GEO)	Taha Akgül (TUR)	Oleksandr Khotsianivskyi (UKR)
2021 Oslo	Amir Hossein Zare (IRI)	Geno Petriashvili (GEO)	Mönkhtöriin Lkhagvagerel (MGL)
2021 Oslo	Amir Hossein Zare (IRI)	Geno Petriashvili (GEO)	Taha Akgül (TUR)
2022 Belgrade	Taha Akgül (TUR)	Mönkhtöriin Lkhagvagerel (MGL)	Geno Petriashvili (GEO)
2022 Belgrade	Taha Akgül (TUR)	Mönkhtöriin Lkhagvagerel (MGL)	Amir Hossein Zare (IRI)
2023 Belgrade	Amir Hossein Zare (IRI)	Geno Petriashvili (GEO)	Taha Akgül (TUR)
2023 Belgrade	Amir Hossein Zare (IRI)	Geno Petriashvili (GEO)	Mason Parris (USA)
2025 Zagreb	Amir Hossein Zare (IRI)	Giorgi Meshvildishvili (AZE)	Shamil Sharipov (BRN)
2025 Zagreb	Amir Hossein Zare (IRI)	Giorgi Meshvildishvili (AZE)	Robert Baran (POL)
2026 Astana	Amir Hossein Zare (IRI)	Abdulla Kurbanov (RUS)	Giorgi Meshvildishvili (AZE)
2026 Astana	Amir Hossein Zare (IRI)	Abdulla Kurbanov (RUS)	Wyatt Hendrickson (USA)

== Medal table ==
Rank	Nation	Gold	Silver	Bronze	Total
1	Soviet Union	121	44	38	203
2	United States	64	57	64	185
3	Russia	62	20	38	120
4	Iran	57	61	56	174
5	Turkey	30	29	37	96
6	Japan	29	27	33	89
7	Bulgaria	22	54	47	123
8	Cuba	12	16	26	54
9	Georgia	9	12	29	50
10	North Korea	9	4	3	16
11	Azerbaijan	6	19	19	44
12	East Germany	5	15	17	37
13	Ukraine	5	7	23	35
14	Uzbekistan	5	6	16	27
15	Armenia	5	1	12	18
16	South Korea	4	10	8	22
17	West Germany	4	3	7	14
–	Individual Neutral Athletes (Note: At the 2023 and 2024 World Championships, in accordance with sanctions imposed following by the 2022 Russian invasion of Ukraine, wrestlers from Russia were not permitted to use the name, flag, or anthem of Russia. They instead participated as Individual Neutral Athletes (AIN), their medals were not included in the official medal table.)	4	1	2	7
18	Mongolia	3	16	26	45
19	Germany	3	5	5	13
20	Russian Wrestling Federation (Note: At the 2021 World Championships, in accordance with a ban by the World Anti-Doping Agency (WADA), wrestlers from Russia were not permitted to use the Russian name, flag, or anthem. They instead participated under the name and the modified flag of the Russian Wrestling Federation (RWF).)	3	1	4	8
21	Hungary	2	8	13	23
22	Kazakhstan	2	6	14	22
23	Canada	2	5	6	13
24	Belarus	2	4	13	19
25	Sweden	2	3	6	11
26	Italy	2	3	5	10
27	Poland	1	7	8	16
28	Romania	1	4	9	14
29	India	1	4	8	13
30	Greece	1	3	2	6
31	Czechoslovakia	1	2	2	5
32	Moldova	1	2	1	4
33	Bahrain	1	1	3	5
34	Albania	1	1	2	4
34	France	1	1	2	4
–	United World Wrestling (Note: At the 2025 World Championships, wrestlers from Russia were not permitted to use the name, flag, or anthem of Russia. They instead participated under the name and the flag of the United World Wrestling (UWW), their medals were not included in the official medal table.)	1	1	1	3
36	Serbia	1	0	2	3
37	Finland	0	6	1	7
38	Slovakia	0	4	5	9
39	Kyrgyzstan	0	3	10	13
40	Yugoslavia	0	2	1	3
41	Puerto Rico	0	2	0	2
42	China	0	1	1	2
42	North Macedonia	0	1	1	2
42	Tajikistan	0	1	1	2
45	Mexico	0	1	0	1
46	Pakistan	0	0	2	2
47	Israel	0	0	1	1
47	San Marino	0	0	1	1
47	Spain	0	0	1	1
47	Switzerland	0	0	1	1
Totals (50 entries)		485	484	633	1,602

- Names in italic are national entities that no longer exist.
