= Pakistan at the 1964 Summer Olympics =

- IOC code: PAK
- NOC: National Olympic Committee of Pakistan
- Website: www.nocpakistan.org

in Tokyo
- Competitors: 41 in 7 sports
- Flag bearer: Manzoor Hussain Atif
- Medals Ranked 30th: Gold 0 Silver 1 Bronze 0 Total 1

Summer Olympics appearances (overview)
- 1948; 1952; 1956; 1960; 1964; 1968; 1972; 1976; 1980; 1984; 1988; 1992; 1996; 2000; 2004; 2008; 2012; 2016; 2020; 2024

Pakistan competed at the 1964 Summer Olympics in Tokyo, Japan. 41 competitors, all men, took part in 29 events in 7 sports. They won a silver medal in the men's field hockey team competition, where they were defending their title won at the 1960 Summer Olympics.

== Medalists ==
Silver medal in the men's field hockey team competition.

Medals by sport
Sport	Gold	Silver	Bronze	Total
Field Hockey	0	1	0	1
Total	0	1	0	1

== Athletics ==
Men's 100 metres

- Iftikhar Shah

- 1st round heat G; 11.4 (→ did not advance)

Men's 400 metres

- Mohammad Sadiq

- 1st round heat D; 47.3 (→ advanced to 2nd round)
- 2nd round heat A; 48.0 (→ did not advance)

Men's 800 metres

- Anar Khan

- 1st round heat B; 1:56.4 (→ did not advance)

Men's 1500 metres

- Anar Khan

- 1st round heat C; 3:56.7 (→ did not advance)

Men's 110 metres hurdles

- Ghulam Raziq

- 1st round heat B; 14.7 (→ did not advance)

Men's 400 metres hurdles

- Manzoor-ul-Haq Awan

- 1st round heat C; 55.3 (→ did not advance)

Men's long jump

- Iftikhar Shah

- Qualification round; Disqualified -- all three jumps not measured

Men's marathon

- Mohammad Yousuf

- 2:40.46.0 finished 48th out of 58

== Boxing ==
Men's lightweight (up to 60 kg)

- Ghulam Sarwar

- Series No 2; Beat Jacques Cotot (FRA) on pts
- Series No 3; Lost to James Vincent McCourt (IRL) on pts

Men's middleweight (up to 75 kg)

- Sultan Mahmood

- Series No 2; Lost to Valery Popenchenko (USSR) RSC 1st rd

Men's light heavyweight (up to 81 kg)

- Barkat Ali

- Series No 1; Lost to Robert H Christopherson (USA) on pts

Men's heavyweight (over 81 kg)

- Abdul Rehman

- Series No 2; Lost to Hans Huber (GER) KO 1st rd

== Cycling ==
Men's 1,000 metres time trial

- Muhammad Hafeez

- Final classification; 1:18.50 (45.859 km/h) 23rd out of 25

Men's 4,000 metres team pursuit race

- Mohammad Ashiq, Lal Bux, Muhammad Hafeez and Muhammad Shafi

- Elimination heats race No 7; 5:38.77 (42.506 km/h) Lost to Preeda Chullamondhol, Somchai Chantarasamriti and Smaisuk Krisansuwan (THAI)

Men's 4,000 metres individual pursuit race

- Mohammad Ashiq

- Elimination heats race No 12; Disqualified as Antonio Duque Garza (MEX) Wbp (Won by pursuing)

Men's scratch sprint race

- Muhammad Hafeez

- Heats race No 3; Lost to Sergio Bianchetto (ITA)
- Repechages elimination race No 7; Lost to Peder Pedersen (DEN)

== Hockey ==
=== Men's team competition ===
Pool A first round league

- Defeated Japan (1-0)
- Defeated Kenya (5-2)
- Defeated Great Britain (1-0)
- Defeated Rhodesia (6-0)
- Defeated New Zealand (2-0)
- Defeated Australia (2-1)

Semifinals

- Defeated Spain (3-0)

Final

- Lost to India (0-1)

Pakistan won the silver medal

Team Roster

- Manzoor Hussain Atif (captain)
- Anwar Khan (vice-captain)
- Abdul Hameed (gk)
- Mazhar Hussain (gk)
- Munir Dar
- Tariq Aziz
- Saeed Anwar
- Zafar Hayat
- Muhammad Rashid
- Zafar Ahmed Khan
- Mohammad Asad Malik
- Muhammad Manna
- Motiullah
- Khawaja Zakauddin
- Tariq Niazi
- Khizar Nawaz Bajwa
- Khalid Mahmood
- Khurshid Azam

== Shooting ==
Four shooters represented Pakistan in 1964.

25 m pistol

- Hav Abdur Rashid

- 269/269 = 538 score finished 49th out of 53

50 m pistol

- Abdul Salam Muhammad

- 87/81/86/77/88/88 = 507 score finished 46th out of 52

50 m rifle, three positions

- Aziz Ahmed Chaudhry

- 376/352/312 = 1040 score finished 50th out of 53

50 m rifle, prone

- Aziz Ahmed Chaudhry

- 93/96/96/90/95/97 = 567 score finished 73rd out of 73

Trap

- Mohiuddin Khawaja

- 17/3/12/13/16/12/8/10 = 91 score finished 51st out of 51

== Weightlifting ==
Men's bantamweight (56 kg)

- Mohammad Azam Mian

- Press 87.5 kg
- Snatch 87.5 kg
- Jerk 120.0 kg
- Total 295.0kg (finished 20th out of 24)

== Wrestling ==
Men's flyweight (52 kg)

- Mohammad Niaz

- 1st round; Drew with Said Aliakbar Haydari (IRN)
- 2nd round; Beat Athanasios Zafiropoulos (GRE)
- 3rd round; Beat Stoytcho Malov Georgiev (BUL)
- 4th round; Lost to Chang Sun Chang (KOR)

Men's bantamweight (57 kg)

- Siraj Din

- 1st round; Beat Walter Pilling (GBR)
- 2nd round; Beat Karl Dodrimont (GER)
- 3rd round; Lost to Yojiro Uetake (JPN)

Men's featherweight (63 kg)

- Mohammad Akhtar

- 1st round; Lost to Nodar Khokhashvili (USSR)
- 2nd round; Lost to Stantcho Kolev Ivanov (BUL)

Men's lightweight (70 kg)

- Mohammad Bashir

- 1st round; Beat Stefanos Ioannidis (GRE)
- 2nd round; Lost to Zarbegi Beriashvili (USSR)
- 3rd round; Lost to Mahmut Atalay (TUR) by fall

Men's welterweight (78 kg)

- Muhammad Afzal

- 1st round; Lost to Karoly Bajko (HUN)
- 2nd round; Beat Byung-Sup Choi (KOR)
- 3rd round; Beat Perko A Dermendjiev (BUL)
- 4th round; Lost to Mohamad-Ali Sanatkaran (IRN) by default

Men's middleweight (87 kg)

- Faiz Muhammad

- 1st round; Beat Alfonso Rafael Gonzalez (PAN)
- 2nd round; Drew with Doo-Man Kang (KOR)
- 3rd round; Lost to Geza Hollosi (HUN)
- 4th round; Lost to Daniel Oliver Brand (USA) by fall
