= Wrestling at the 1964 Summer Olympics – Men's freestyle welterweight =

Wrestling at the Olympics

Men's freestyle welterweight at the Games of the XVIII Olympiad
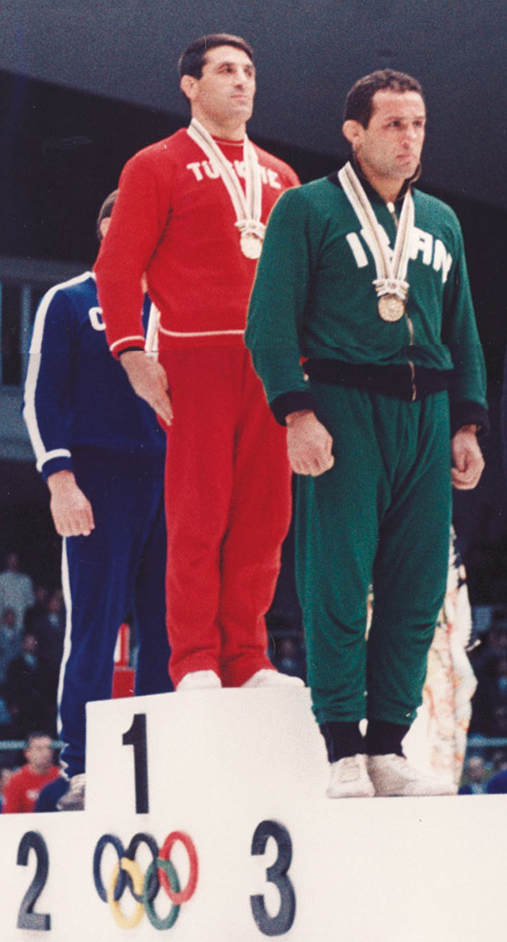
- The final podium.
- Venue: Komazawa Gymnasium
- Dates: 11–14 October 1964
- Competitors: 22 from 22 nations

Medalists
1st place, gold medalist(s)		İsmail Oğan	Turkey
2nd place, silver medalist(s)		Guram Sagaradze	Soviet Union
3rd place, bronze medalist(s)		Mohammad Ali Sanatkaran	Iran

The men's freestyle welterweight competition at the 1964 Summer Olympics in Tokyo took place from 11 to 14 October at the Komazawa Gymnasium. Nations were limited to one competitor. Welterweight was the fourth-heaviest category, including wrestlers weighing 70 to 78 kilograms (154.3 to 172.0 lb).

== Competition format ==
This freestyle wrestling competition continued to use the "bad points" elimination system introduced at the 1928 Summer Olympics for Greco-Roman and at the 1932 Summer Olympics for freestyle wrestling, as adjusted at the 1960 Summer Olympics. Each bout awarded 4 points. If the victory was by fall, the winner received 0 and the loser 4. If the victory was by decision, the winner received 1 and the loser 3. If the bout was tied, each wrestler received 2 points. A wrestler who accumulated 6 or more points was eliminated. Rounds continued until there were 3 or fewer uneliminated wrestlers. If only 1 wrestler remained, he received the gold medal. If 2 wrestlers remained, point totals were ignored and they faced each other for gold and silver (if they had already wrestled each other, that result was used). If 3 wrestlers remained, point totals were ignored and a round-robin was held among those 3 to determine medals (with previous head-to-head results, if any, counting for this round-robin).

== Results ==
=== Round 1 ===
Tribble and Barlie withdrew after their bouts.

Bouts

Winner	Nation	Victory Type	Loser	Nation
Petko Dermendzhiev	Bulgaria	Fall	Choi Byeong-seop	South Korea
Mohammad Ali Sanatkaran	Iran	Decision	Martin Heinze	United Team of Germany
Yasuo Watanabe	Japan	Decision	Ştefan Tampa	Romania
Phil Oberlander	Canada	Fall	Harald Barlie	Norway
Guram Sagaradze	Soviet Union	Fall	Job Mayo	Philippines
Shakar Khan Shakar	Afghanistan	Tie	Len Allen	Great Britain
İsmail Oğan	Turkey	Fall	Charles Tribble	United States
Madho Singh	India	Decision	Julio Graffigna	Argentina
Jigjidiin Mönkhbat	Mongolia	Decision	John Boyle	Australia
Károly Bajkó	Hungary	Decision	Muhammad Afzal	Pakistan
Gaetano De Vescovi	Italy	Decision	Joe Feeney	Ireland

Points

Rank	Wrestler	Nation	R1
1	Petko Dermendzhiev	Bulgaria	0
1	Phil Oberlander	Canada	0
1	İsmail Oğan	Turkey	0
1	Guram Sagaradze	Soviet Union	0
5	Károly Bajkó	Hungary	1
5	Gaetano De Vescovi	Italy	1
5	Jigjidiin Mönkhbat	Mongolia	1
5	Mohammad Ali Sanatkaran	Iran	1
5	Madho Singh	India	1
5	Yasuo Watanabe	Japan	1
11	Len Allen	Great Britain	2
11	Shakar Khan Shakar	Afghanistan	2
13	Muhammad Afzal	Pakistan	3
13	John Boyle	Australia	3
13	Joe Feeney	Ireland	3
13	Julio Graffigna	Argentina	3
13	Martin Heinze	United Team of Germany	3
13	Ştefan Tampa	Romania	3
19	Choi Byeong-seop	South Korea	4
19	Job Mayo	Philippines	4
21	Harald Barlie	Norway	4*
21	Charles Tribble	United States	4*

=== Round 2 ===
Four men were eliminated after a second loss, and a fifth eliminated after a tie and loss by fall. Sagaradze and Oberlander led the group with 0 points after the second round.

Bouts

Winner	Nation	Victory Type	Loser	Nation
Petko Dermendzhiev	Bulgaria	Decision	Károly Bajkó	Hungary
Muhammad Afzal	Pakistan	Decision	Choi Byeong-seop	South Korea
Mohammad Ali Sanatkaran	Iran	Decision	Yasuo Watanabe	Japan
Martin Heinze	United Team of Germany	Decision	Ştefan Tampa	Romania
Phil Oberlander	Canada	Fall	Job Mayo	Philippines
Guram Sagaradze	Soviet Union	Fall	Shakar Khan Shakar	Afghanistan
Julio Graffigna	Argentina	Decision	Len Allen	Great Britain
İsmail Oğan	Turkey	Decision	Madho Singh	India
Joe Feeney	Ireland	Decision	John Boyle	Australia
Jigjidiin Mönkhbat	Mongolia	Decision	Gaetano De Vescovi	Italy

Points

Rank	Wrestler	Nation	R1	R2	Total
1	Phil Oberlander	Canada	0	0	0
1	Guram Sagaradze	Soviet Union	0	0	0
3	Petko Dermendzhiev	Bulgaria	0	1	1
3	İsmail Oğan	Turkey	0	1	1
5	Jigjidiin Mönkhbat	Mongolia	1	1	2
5	Mohammad Ali Sanatkaran	Iran	1	1	2
7	Muhammad Afzal	Pakistan	3	1	4
7	Károly Bajkó	Hungary	1	3	4
7	Gaetano De Vescovi	Italy	1	3	4
7	Joe Feeney	Ireland	3	1	4
7	Julio Graffigna	Argentina	3	1	4
7	Martin Heinze	United Team of Germany	3	1	4
7	Madho Singh	India	1	3	4
7	Yasuo Watanabe	Japan	1	3	4
15	Len Allen	Great Britain	2	3	5
16	John Boyle	Australia	3	3	6
16	Shakar Khan Shakar	Afghanistan	2	4	6
16	Ştefan Tampa	Romania	3	3	6
19	Choi Byeong-seop	South Korea	4	3	7
20	Job Mayo	Philippines	4	4	8

=== Round 3 ===
Five more wrestlers were eliminated, each with two losses. Sagaradze received his first point, but now led alone at 1 after Oberlander lost by decision and received 3 points.

Bouts

Winner	Nation	Victory Type	Loser	Nation
Muhammad Afzal	Pakistan	Decision	Petko Dermendzhiev	Bulgaria
Mohammad Ali Sanatkaran	Iran	Decision	Károly Bajkó	Hungary
Yasuo Watanabe	Japan	Decision	Martin Heinze	United Team of Germany
Guram Sagaradze	Soviet Union	Decision	Phil Oberlander	Canada
Madho Singh	India	Decision	Len Allen	Great Britain
İsmail Oğan	Turkey	Decision	Julio Graffigna	Argentina
Jigjidiin Mönkhbat	Mongolia	Decision	Joe Feeney	Ireland
Gaetano De Vescovi	Italy	Bye	N/A	N/A

Points

Rank	Wrestler	Nation	R1	R2	R3	Total
1	Guram Sagaradze	Soviet Union	0	0	1	1
2	İsmail Oğan	Turkey	0	1	1	2
3	Jigjidiin Mönkhbat	Mongolia	1	1	1	3
3	Phil Oberlander	Canada	0	0	3	3
3	Mohammad Ali Sanatkaran	Iran	1	1	1	3
6	Gaetano De Vescovi	Italy	1	3	0	4
6	Petko Dermendzhiev	Bulgaria	0	1	3	4
8	Muhammad Afzal	Pakistan	3	1	1	5
8	Madho Singh	India	1	3	1	5
8	Yasuo Watanabe	Japan	1	3	1	5
11	Károly Bajkó	Hungary	1	3	3	7
11	Joe Feeney	Ireland	3	1	3	7
11	Julio Graffigna	Argentina	3	1	3	7
11	Martin Heinze	United Team of Germany	3	1	3	7
15	Len Allen	Great Britain	2	3	3	8

=== Round 4 ===
Over half of the remaining wrestlers were eliminated, as all 5 losers and 1 of the winners accumulated at least 6 points. Oğan moved up into a tie for the lead with Sagaradze at 2 points; Sanatkaran followed closely at 3 while Dermendzhiev moved to the brink of elimination at 5 points.

Bouts

Winner	Nation	Victory Type	Loser	Nation
Petko Dermendzhiev	Bulgaria	Decision	Gaetano De Vescovi	Italy
Mohammad Ali Sanatkaran	Iran	Default	Muhammad Afzal	Pakistan
Yasuo Watanabe	Japan	Decision	Phil Oberlander	Canada
Guram Sagaradze	Soviet Union	Decision	Madho Singh	India
İsmail Oğan	Turkey	Foul	Jigjidiin Mönkhbat	Mongolia

Points

Rank	Wrestler	Nation	R1	R2	R3	R4	Total
1	İsmail Oğan	Turkey	0	1	1	0	2
1	Guram Sagaradze	Soviet Union	0	0	1	1	2
3	Mohammad Ali Sanatkaran	Iran	1	1	1	0	3
4	Petko Dermendzhiev	Bulgaria	0	1	3	1	5
5	Phil Oberlander	Canada	0	0	3	3	6
5	Yasuo Watanabe	Japan	1	3	1	1	6
7	Gaetano De Vescovi	Italy	1	3	0	3	7
7	Jigjidiin Mönkhbat	Mongolia	1	1	1	4	7
9	Madho Singh	India	1	3	1	3	8
10	Muhammad Afzal	Pakistan	3	1	1	4	9

=== Round 5 ===
Dermendzhiev was the only wrestler eliminated in round 5, leaving 3 remaining wrestlers.

Bouts

Winner	Nation	Victory Type	Loser	Nation
Mohammad Ali Sanatkaran	Iran	Decision	Petko Dermendzhiev	Bulgaria
Guram Sagaradze	Soviet Union	Tie	İsmail Oğan	Turkey

Points

Rank	Wrestler	Nation	R1	R2	R3	R4	R5	Total
1	İsmail Oğan	Turkey	0	1	1	0	2	4
1	Guram Sagaradze	Soviet Union	0	0	1	1	2	4
3	Mohammad Ali Sanatkaran	Iran	1	1	1	0	1	4
4	Petko Dermendzhiev	Bulgaria	0	1	3	1	3	8

=== Final round ===
The round 5 draw between Sagaradze and Oğan counted for the final round. Sanatkaran wrestled both of the other medalists to a tie in the final rounds as well. This left all 3 wrestlers in a three-way tie on final round points at 6 because each had drawn the others. The next tie-breaker was total bad points throughout the tournament. Sanatkaran received the bronze medal, having the highest point total at 8 to the other two men's 6. Oğan prevailed on Sagaradze on the next tie-breaker, body weight, with the lighter Turk winning over the heavier Soviet.

Bouts

Winner	Nation	Victory Type	Loser	Nation
Guram Sagaradze	Soviet Union	Tie (Round 5)	İsmail Oğan	Turkey
Mohammad Ali Sanatkaran	Iran	Tie	Guram Sagaradze	Soviet Union
Mohammad Ali Sanatkaran	Iran	Tie	İsmail Oğan	Turkey

Points

Rank	Wrestler	Nation	Points	R1	R2	R3	R4	R5	FR	Total
1st place, gold medalist(s)	İsmail Oğan	Turkey	6	0	1	1	0	2	2	6
2nd place, silver medalist(s)	Guram Sagaradze	Soviet Union	6	0	0	1	1	2	2	6
3rd place, bronze medalist(s)	Mohammad Ali Sanatkaran	Iran	6	1	1	1	0	1	4	8
