= Wrestling at the 1962 British Empire and Commonwealth Games =

- Venue: Royal King's Park Tennis Club
- Location: Kings Park, Western Australia, Australia
- Dates: 22 November to 1 December 1962

Wrestling at the 1962 British Empire and Commonwealth Games was the seventh appearance of Wrestling at the Commonwealth Games. The events were held in Perth, Australia, and featured contests in eight weight classes.

The wrestling events were held in the Royal King's Park Tennis Club, outdoor, under floodlights, after the original plans to use the Drill Hall venue were rejected.

Pakistan dominated the wrestling medal table by virtue of winning seven of the eight gold medals on offer.

== Medal table ==
* Host nation (Australia)

Medals won by nation with totals, ranked by number of golds—sortable
Rank	Nation	Gold	Silver	Bronze	Total
1	Pakistan	7	1	0	8
2	England	1	1	3	5
3	Australia	0	3	1	4
3	Canada	0	3	1	4
5	New Zealand	0	0	2	2
6	Scotland	0	0	1	1
Totals (6 entries)		8	8	8	24

== Medallists ==
Medallists in men's wrestling by event
Event	Gold	Silver	Bronze
Flyweight 52kg	Muhammad Niaz Din (PAK)	Peter Michienzi (CAN)	Warren Nisbet (NZL)
Bantamweight 57kg	Siraj-ud-Din (PAK)	Walter Pilling (ENG)	Jim Turnbull (SCO)
Featherweight 62kg	Ala-ud-Din (PAK)	Matti Jutila (CAN)	Bert Aspen (ENG)
Lightweight 68kg	Muhammad Akhtar (PAK)	Sid Marsh (AUS)	Kurt Boese (CAN)
Welterweight 74kg	Muhammad Bashir (PAK)	Phil Oberlander (CAN)	Len Allen (ENG)
Middleweight 82kg	Muhammad Faiz (PAK)	Michael Benarik (AUS)	Fred Thomas (NZL)
Light heavyweight 90kg	Tony Buck (ENG)	Muhammad Saeed (PAK)	Jim Armstrong (AUS)
Heavyweight 100kg	Muhammad Niaz (PAK)	Ray Mitchell (AUS)	Denis McNamara (ENG)

== Results ==
=== Flyweight 52kg ===
Winner	Loser	Score
Muhammad Niaz Din (PAK)	Peter Michienzi (CAN)	points
Trevor James Dwyer (AUS)	Warren Nisbet (NZL)	points
Peter Michienzi (CAN)	Warren Nisbet (NZL)	points
Muhammad Niaz Din (PAK)	Trevor James Dwyer (AUS)	points
Peter Michienzi (CAN)	Trevor James Dwyer (AUS)	disq overweight

Final positions: 1. Niaz Din 2. Michienzi 3. Nisbet 4. Dwyer

=== Bantamweight 57kg ===
Winner	Loser	Score
Walter Pilling (ENG)	Alex Fernando (CEY)	fall 1st round
Siraj-ud-Din (PAK)	Arthur William Tooby (AUS)	points
Jim Turnbull (SCO)	H. Plykkanen (CAN)	points
H. Plykkanen (CAN)	Arthur William Tooby (AUS)	points
Siraj-ud-Din (PAK)	Walter Pilling (ENG)	points
Jim Turnbull (SCO)	Alex Fernando (CEY)	points
Siraj-ud-Din (PAK)	H. Plykkanen (CAN)	points
Walter Pilling (ENG)	Jim Turnbull (SCO)	points
Siraj-ud-Din (PAK)	Jim Turnbull (SCO)	points

Final positions: 1. ud-Din 2. Pilling 3. Turnbull 4. Plykkanen 5. Tooby, Fernando

=== Featherweight 62kg ===
Winner	Loser	Score
Bert Aspen (ENG)	John David Cobain Little (AUS)	points
Ala-ud-Din (PAK)	Ifor B. Roberts (NZL)	points
Matti Jutila (CAN)	John David Cobain Little (AUS)	fall 6min 14 sec
Bert Aspen (ENG)	Ifor B. Roberts (NZL)	
Ala-ud-Din (PAK)	Matti Jutila (CAN)	fall 9min 54sec
Ala-ud-Din (PAK)	Bert Aspen (ENG)	points
Matti Jutila (CAN)	Bert Aspen (ENG)	points ret hurt

Final positions: 1. ud-Din 2. Jutila 3. Aspen 4. Little 5. Roberts

=== Lightweight 68kg ===
Winner	Loser	Score
Sid Marsh (AUS)	Kurt Boese (CAN)	points
Muhammad Akhtar (PAK)	Peter Amey (ENG)	points
Sid Marsh (AUS)	Peter Amey (ENG)	points
Muhammad Akhtar (PAK)	Kurt Boese (CAN)	points
Muhammad Akhtar (PAK)	Sid Marsh (AUS)	fall 7min 06sec
Kurt Boese (CAN)	Peter Amey (ENG)	bronze medal play off

Final positions: 1. Akhtar 2. Marsh 3. Boese 4. Amey

=== Welterweight 74kg ===
Winner	Loser	Score
Phil Oberlander (CAN)	Len Allen (ENG)	decision fall
George Farquhar (SCO)	John Raftopoulas (AUS)	Draw
Muhammad Bashir (PAK)	Barrie E. Courtney (NZL)	fall 1st round
Len Allen (ENG)	George Farquhar (SCO)	points
Phil Oberlander (CAN)	Barrie E. Courtney (NZL)	w/o
Muhammad Bashir (PAK)	John Raftopoulas (AUS)	fall 3min 04sec
Muhammad Bashir (PAK)	Len Allen (ENG)	points
Phil Oberlander (CAN)	George Farquhar (SCO)	fall 44sec
Muhammad Bashir (PAK)	Phil Oberlander (CAN)	points

Final positions: 1. Bashir 2. Oberlander 3. Allen 4. Raftopoulas, Farquhar 5. Courtney

=== Middleweight 82kg ===
Winner	Loser	Score
Michael Benarik (AUS)	Fred Thomas (NZL)	points
Muhammad Faiz (PAK)	Alastair McNeill (SCO)	
Michael Benarik (AUS)	Len Pidduck (FRN)	points
Fred Thomas (NZL)	Alastair McNeill (SCO)	fall 3min 04sec
Fred Thomas (NZL)	Len Pidduck (FRN)	points
Muhammad Faiz (PAK)	Michael Benarik (AUS)	points
Muhammad Faiz (PAK)	Fred Thomas (NZL)	points

Final positions: 1. Faiz 2. Benarik 3. Thomas 4. McNeill, Pidduck

=== Light heavyweight 90kg ===
Winner	Loser	Score
Tony Buck (ENG)	Muhammad Saeed (PAK)	
Tony Buck (ENG)	Jim Armstrong (AUS)	points
Muhammad Saeed (PAK)	Jim Armstrong (AUS)	w/o

Final positions: 1. Buck 2. Saeed 3. Armstrong

=== Heavyweight 100kg ===
Winner	Loser	Score
Ray Mitchell (AUS)	Denis McNamara (ENG)	points
Muhammad Niaz (PAK)	Ray Mitchell (AUS)	points
Muhammad Niaz (PAK)	Denis McNamara (ENG)	fall 3min

Final positions: 1. Niaz 2. Mitchell 3. McNamara
