= Ștefan Tampa =

Romanian wrestler

Personal information
- Nationality: Romanian
- Born: 16 March 1943 (age 83)

Sport
- Sport: Wrestling

Ștefan Tampa (born 16 March 1943) is a Romanian wrestler. He competed in the men's freestyle welterweight at the 1964 Summer Olympics.
