= Charles Tribble =

American wrestler (1942–2009)

Personal information
- Born: April 24, 1942 Indio, California, U.S.
- Died: October 17, 2009 (aged 67) Phoenix, Arizona, U.S.

Sport
- Country: United States
- Sport: Wrestling
- Events: Freestyle and Folkstyle
- Club: California National Guard
- Team: USA
Medal record
Collegiate Wrestling
Representing the Arizona State Sun Devils
NCAA Division I Championships
Bronze medal – third place	1965 Laramie	177 lb

Charles Tribble (April 24, 1942 – October 17, 2009) was an American wrestler. He competed in the men's freestyle welterweight at the 1964 Summer Olympics.
