= Jim Turnbull =

British wrestler (born 1929)

Personal information
- Nationality: British (Scottish)
- Born: c.1932 Edinburgh, Scotland
- Died: 23 July 2020

Sport
- Sport: Wrestling
- Event: Bantamweight
- Club: Milton AWC, Edinburgh
Medal record
Men's freestyle wrestling
Representing Scotland
Commonwealth Games
Bronze medal – third place	1962 Perth	Bantamweight

James Turnbull (c.1932 – 23 July 2020) was a Scottish wrestler who competed at three British Empire and Commonwealth Games (now Commonwealth Games).

== Biography ==
Turnbull was a member of the Milton Amateur Wrestling Club in Edinburgh.

He was selected for the 1958 Scottish team for the 1958 British Empire and Commonwealth Games in Cardiff, Wales, in the bantamweight category.

In 1962 he was chosen again for the Scottish Commonwealth team for the 1962 British Empire and Commonwealth Games in Perth, Australia, in the bantamweight class, and finished in third place, winning the bronze medal behind the gold medal winner Siraj-ud-Din of Pakistan.

He was a 15 times Scottish senior wrestling champion and a third appearance ensued at the 1966 British Empire and Commonwealth Games. A was also the 1958 British bantamweight champion at the British Wrestling Championships.

In 1978 he was the Danderhall Community Centre manager and president of the Scottish Amateur Wrestling Association. He was nominated to be Scotland's wrestling manager/coach for the 1978 Commonwealth Games.
