= John Boyle (wrestler) =

Australian wrestler (born 1934)

Personal information
- Nationality: Australian
- Born: 1 November 1934 (age 91)

Sport
- Sport: Wrestling

John Martin Boyle (born 1 November 1934) is an Australian wrestler. He competed in the men's freestyle welterweight at the 1964 Summer Olympics.
