= Len Allen =

British wrestler (1931–2022)

Personal information
- Nationality: British (English)
- Born: 22 May 1931 London, England
- Died: 11 April 2022 (aged 90) Tooting, London, England
- Height: 175 cm (5 ft 9 in)
- Weight: 78 kg (172 lb)

Sport
- Sport: Wrestling
Medal record
Men's freestyle wrestling
Representing England
British Empire & Commonwealth Games
Bronze medal – third place	1962 Perth	74 kg

Leonard John Allen (22 May 1931 – 11 April 2022) was a British wrestler who competed at the 1964 Summer Olympics.

== Biography ==
Allen represented the England team at the 1962 British Empire and Commonwealth Games in Perth, Australia. He competed in the 74 kg welterweight event, winning a bronze medal.

At the 1964 Olympic Games in Tokyo, he participated in the men's freestyle welterweight event.

Allen died in Tooting on 11 April 2022, at the age of 90.
