= 1965 World Wrestling Championships =

Freestyle
- Host city: Manchester, United Kingdom
- Dates: 1–3 June 1965

Greco-Roman
- Host city: Tampere, Finland
- Dates: 6–8 June 1965

Champions
- Freestyle: Iran
- Greco-Roman: Soviet Union

The following is the final results of the 1965 World Wrestling Championships. Freestyle competition were held in Manchester, Great Britain and Greco-Roman competition were held in Tampere, Finland.

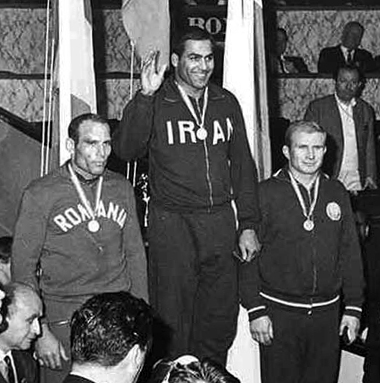
Medal winners of freestyle 87 kg. From left to right, Francisc Balla, Mansour Mehdizadeh and Prodan Gardzhev

== Medal table ==
Rank	Nation	Gold	Silver	Bronze	Total
1	Soviet Union	9	1	1	11
2	Iran	3	2	0	5
3	Japan	2	0	2	4
4	Turkey	1	1	1	3
5	Romania	1	1	0	2
6	Bulgaria	0	4	3	7
7	Hungary	0	2	1	3
7	West Germany	0	2	1	3
9	Poland	0	1	2	3
10	Finland	0	1	1	2
11	Yugoslavia	0	1	0	1
12	Czechoslovakia	0	0	2	2
13	East Germany	0	0	1	1
13	United States	0	0	1	1
Totals (14 entries)		16	16	16	48

== Team ranking ==
Rank	Men's freestyle		Men's Greco-Roman	
Rank	Team	Points	Team	Points
1	Iran	30.5	Soviet Union	42
2	Bulgaria	26.5	Poland	18
3	Soviet Union	24.5	Bulgaria	16.83
4	Turkey	22	Hungary	11.33
5	Japan	20.5	Romania	10
6	Hungary	6.5	West Germany	10

== Medal summary ==
=== Freestyle ===
Event	Gold	Silver	Bronze
Flyweight; 52 kg	Yoshihisa Yoshida; Japan	Bayu Baev; Bulgaria	László Ölveti; Hungary
Bantamweight; 57 kg	Tomiaki Fukuda; Japan	Mohammad Ali Farrokhian; Iran	Karl Dodrimont; West Germany
Featherweight; 63 kg	Ebrahim Seifpour; Iran	Stancho Kolev; Bulgaria	Takeo Morita; Japan
Lightweight; 70 kg	Abdollah Movahed; Iran	Mahmut Atalay; Turkey	Zarbeg Beriashvili; Soviet Union
Welterweight; 78 kg	Guram Sagaradze; Soviet Union	Mohammad Ali Sanatkaran; Iran	Yasuo Watanabe; Japan
Middleweight; 87 kg	Mansour Mehdizadeh; Iran	Francisc Balla; Romania	Prodan Gardzhev; Bulgaria
Light heavyweight 97 kg	Ahmet Ayık; Turkey	Aleksandr Medved; Soviet Union	Said Mustafov; Bulgaria
Heavyweight +97 kg	Aleksandr Ivanitsky; Soviet Union	Lyutvi Ahmedov; Bulgaria	Larry Kristoff; United States

=== Greco-Roman ===
Event	Gold	Silver	Bronze
Flyweight; 52 kg	Sergey Rybalko; Soviet Union	Rolf Lacour; West Germany	Angel Kerezov; Bulgaria
Bantamweight; 57 kg	Ion Cernea; Romania	Fritz Stange; West Germany	Bernard Knitter; Poland
Featherweight; 63 kg	Yury Grigoriev; Soviet Union	Martti Laakso; Finland	Lothar Schneider; East Germany
Lightweight; 70 kg	Gennady Sapunov; Soviet Union	Stevan Horvat; Yugoslavia	Eero Tapio; Finland
Welterweight; 78 kg	Anatoly Kolesov; Soviet Union	Kiril Petkov; Bulgaria	Sırrı Acar; Turkey
Middleweight; 87 kg	Rimantas Bagdonas; Soviet Union	Bolesław Mackiewicz; Poland	Jiří Kormaník; Czechoslovakia
Light heavyweight 97 kg	Valery Anisimov; Soviet Union	Ferenc Kiss; Hungary	Czesław Kwieciński; Poland
Heavyweight +97 kg	Nikolay Shmakov; Soviet Union	István Kozma; Hungary	Petr Kment; Czechoslovakia
