= Shakar Khan Shakar =

Afghan wrestler (born 1940)

Shakar Khan Shakar (born 3 September 1940) is a former wrestler from Afghanistan, who competed at the 1964 Summer Olympics and the 1972 Summer Olympics in the welterweight events.
