= Choi Byeong-seop =

South Korean wrestler

Personal information
- Nationality: South Korean
- Born: 25 February 1938 (age 88)

Sport
- Sport: Wrestling

Choi Byeong-seop (born 25 February 1938) is a South Korean wrestler. He competed in the men's freestyle welterweight at the 1964 Summer Olympics.
