= Tomiaki Fukuda =

Japanese wrestler (born 1941)

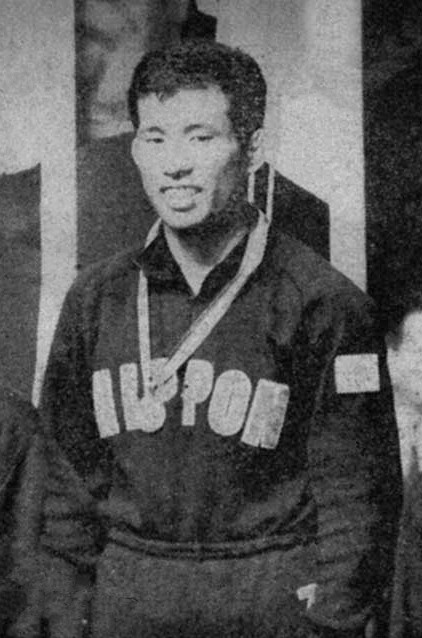
- Fukuda at the 1965 World Championships

Personal information
- Born: December 19, 1941 (age 84)

Sport
- Sport: Freestyle wrestling
Medal record
Representing Japan
World Championships
Gold medal – first place	1965 Manchester	57 kg

Tomiaki Fukuda (福田 富昭, Fukuda Tomiaki; born December 19, 1941) is a Japanese sports official and retired freestyle wrestler who won the world bantamweight title in 1965. He is vice president of the Japanese Olympic Committee, where he heads the National Training Center Commission. He is also president of Japan Wrestling Federation and vice president of the International Federation of Associated Wrestling (FILA). He served as chef de mission for the Japanese teams at the 2008 Summer Olympics and 2005 East Asian Games.

== Awards and honors ==
- 2025 - Person of Cultural Merit
