= Larry Kristoff =

American wrestler (1942–2026)

Personal information
- Full name: Lawrence Dean Kristoff
- Born: November 11, 1942 Carbondale, Illinois, U.S.
- Died: October 31, 2026 (aged 83)

Sport
- Country: United States
- Sport: Wrestling
- Events: Freestyle and Folkstyle
- College team: SIU-Carbondale
- Club: Mayor Daley Youth Foundation
- Team: USA
Medal record
Men's freestyle wrestling
Representing the United States
World Championships
Silver medal – second place	1966 Toledo	97 kg+
Silver medal – second place	1969 Mar del Plata	100 kg
Silver medal – second place	1970 Edmonton	100 kg
Bronze medal – third place	1965 Manchester	97 kg+
Bronze medal – third place	1967 New Dehli	97 kg+
Collegiate Wrestling
Representing SIU-Carbondale
NCAA Division I Championships
Silver medal – second place	1963 Kent	Heavyweight
NCAA Division II Championships
Gold medal – first place	1963 Cedar Falls	Heavyweight
Gold medal – first place	1964 Cedar Falls	Heavyweight

Lawrence Dean Kristoff (November 11, 1942 – October 31, 2026) was an American wrestler. He competed at the 1964 Summer Olympics and the 1968 Summer Olympics. In 2007, Kristoff was inducted into the National Wrestling Hall of Fame as a Distinguished Member. Kristoff died on October 31, 2026, at the age of 83.
