= Francisc Balla =

Romanian wrestler (1932–2023)

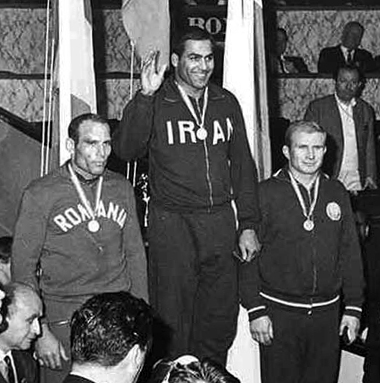
- Balla (left) at the 1965 World Championships

Personal information
- Born: 22 October 1932 Păuleni-Ciuc, Romania
- Died: 16 October 2023 (aged 90)
- Height: 182 cm (6 ft 0 in)

Sport
- Sport: Freestyle wrestling
Medal record
Representing Romania
World Wrestling Championships
Silver medal – second place	1965 Manchester	-87 kg
Silver medal – second place	1967 New Delhi	-87 kg
European Wrestling Championships
Silver medal – second place	1967 Istanbul	-87 kg
Bronze medal – third place	1968 Skopje	-87 kg

Francisc Balla (Hungarian: Ferenc Balló, 22 October 1932 – 16 October 2023) was a Romanian middleweight freestyle wrestler. He won silver medals at the 1965 and 1967 world and 1967 European championships. An ethnic Hungarian, he competed for Romania at the 1964 and 1968 Olympics. Balla died on 16 October 2023, at the age of 90.
