= Ali Aliev (wrestler) =

Russian amateur wrestler (1937–1995)

Ali Aliyev Али Алиев
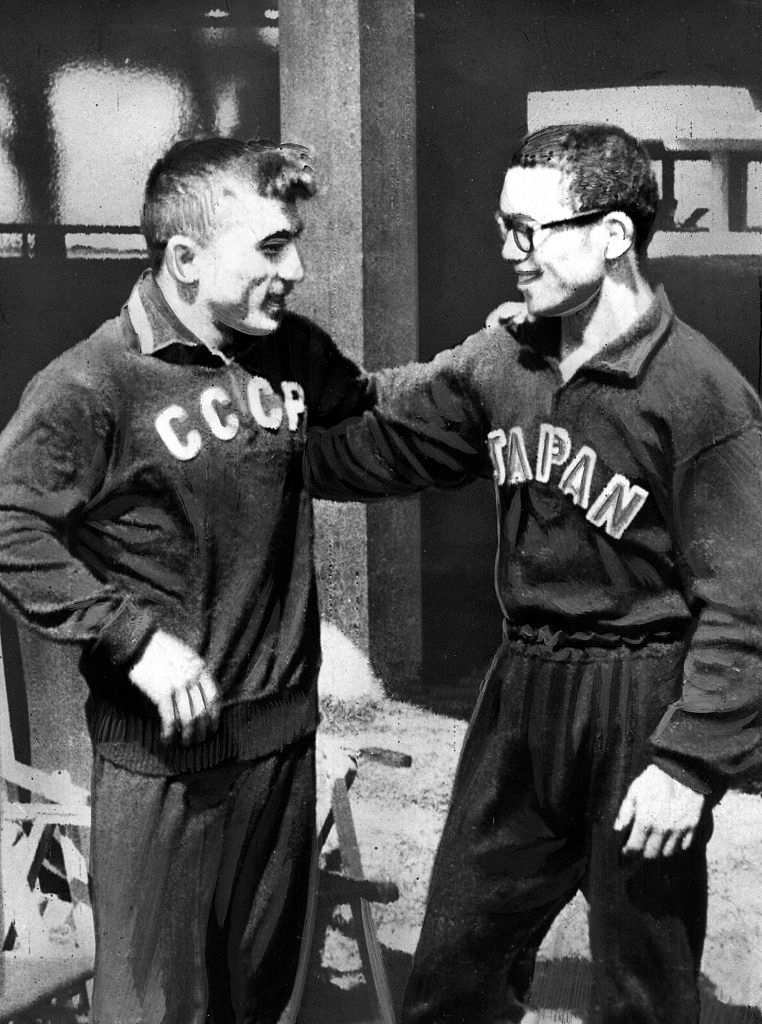
- Aliyev (left) at the 1960 Olympics

Personal information
- Full name: Ali Zurkanaevich Aliyev
- Born: 29 November 1937 Choh, Gunibsky District, Dagestan ASSR, Soviet Union
- Died: 7 January 1995 (aged 57) Moscow, Russia
- Height: 154 cm (5 ft 1 in)
- Weight: 52 kg (115 lb)

Sport
- Country: Dagestan ASSR, Soviet Union
- Sport: Wrestling
- Event: Freestyle
Medal record
Representing the Soviet Union
World Championships
| Gold medal – first place | 1959 Tehran | 52 kg |
| Gold medal – first place | 1961 Yokohama | 52 kg |
| Gold medal – first place | 1962 Toledo | 52 kg |
| Gold medal – first place | 1966 Toledo | 57 kg |
| Gold medal – first place | 1967 New Delhi | 57 kg |
| Silver medal – second place | 1963 Sofia | 52 kg |

Ali Zurkanaevich Aliev (Russian: Али Зурканаевич Алиев; born 29 November 1937 – 7 January 1995) was a Soviet freestyle wrestler. He won five world titles and was the first wrestler from Dagestan to win a world title in freestyle wrestling. He competed at the 1960, 1964 and 1968 Olympic Games, finishing fourth and sixth. After his death, the Russian Wrestling Federation has hosted the annual Ali Aliev Memorial International Wrestling Meeting at the Ali Aliev Wrestling Training Center in Kaspiysk, Dagestan, Russia.
