= İsmail Ogan =

Turkish wrestler (1933–2022)

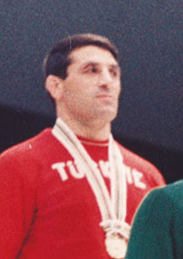
- Ogan, at the 1964 Olympics

Personal information
- Born: 5 March 1933 Antalya, Turkey
- Died: 26 April 2022 (aged 89) Antalya, Turkey
- Height: 170 cm (5 ft 7 in)

Sport
- Sport: Freestyle wrestling
Medal record
Men's freestyle wrestling
Representing Turkey
Olympic Games
Gold medal – first place	1964 Tokyo	78 kg
Silver medal – second place	1960 Rome	73 kg
World Championships
Silver medal – second place	1957 Istanbul	73 kg
Bronze medal – third place	1959 Tehran	73 kg
Bronze medal – third place	1963 Sofia	78 kg
World Cup
Gold medal – first place	1958 Sofia	73 kg

İsmail Ogan (5 March 1933 – 26 April 2022) was a Turkish freestyle wrestler and coach. He competed at the 1960 and 1964 Olympics and won a silver and a gold medal, respectively. He also collected three medals at the world championships between 1957 and 1963.

== Wrestling career ==
İsmail Ogan came from the province (Elmalı) of Antalya on Turkey's southern Mediterranean coast. After Turkish yağlı güreş (oil wrestling) style, which he started with, he switched to Olympic wrestling at the age of 17, after he was discovered by Yaşar Doğu. It did not take long for him to attract the attention of the leading men in the Turkish wrestling federation by performing very well in the national arena. He was included in the national freestyle wrestling team and received perhaps the best Turkish wrestling coaches of the time in Yaşar Doğu and Celal Atik. He appeared on the international wrestling mat in 1957, wrestling very successfully in five world championships and winning three medals. European championships were not held at that time. In his own country, he had three tough rivals in İbrahim Zengin, Nuro Ayvar and Mahmut Atalay, against whom he had to prove himself time and again. At the 1960 Olympics in Rome, he won the silver medal, beaten only by U.S. wonderboy Douglas Blubaugh, the only opponent to whom he conceded only a points victory. Four years later at the Tokyo Olympics he was again convincing and became Olympic champion in the welterweight division.

After the 1964 Olympics, İsmail Ogan ended his career as an active wrestler and went back to live in Antalya, and then worked as a wrestling coach.

İsmail Ogan was taken to Serik State Hospital after an illness on April 9 and then transferred to Akdeniz University Hospital. İsmail Ogan, who was diagnosed with respiratory failure and multiple organ problems, died 26 April 2022.
