= Guram Sagaradze (wrestler) =

Georgian Olympic freestyle wrestler

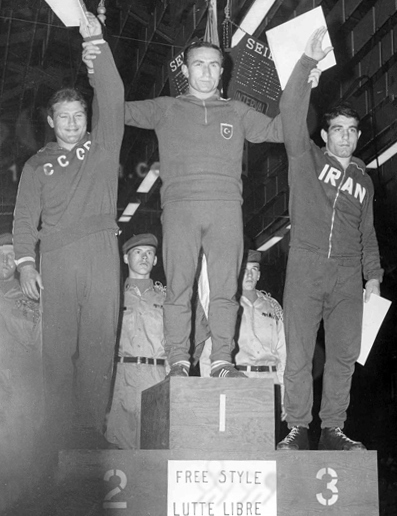
- Sagaradze (left) at the 1966 World Championships

Personal information
- Born: 21 March 1939 (age 87) Tbilisi, Georgian SSR, Soviet Union
- Height: 168 cm (5 ft 6 in)

Sport
- Sport: Freestyle wrestling
- Club: Burevestnik Tbilisi
Medal record
Representing the Soviet Union
Olympic Games
| Silver medal – second place | 1964 Tokyo | 78 kg |
World Championships
| Gold medal – first place | 1963 Sofia | 78 kg |
| Gold medal – first place | 1965 Manchester | 78 kg |
| Silver medal – second place | 1966 Toledo | 78 kg |
| Silver medal – second place | 1967 New Delhi | 78 kg |
European Championships
| Bronze medal – third place | 1968 Skopje | 78 kg |

Guram "Guliko" Sagaradze (Georgian: გურამ საღარაძე; born 21 March 1939) is a retired Georgian welterweight freestyle wrestler. He held the world title in 1963 and 1965 and won silver medals at the 1964 Olympics and 1966 and 1967 world championships. Domestically, he won the Soviet title in 1964–66, placing second in 1967; he finished third in 1968 and was not selected for the 1968 Olympics. He retired the same year to become a wrestling coach in his native Georgia.
