= Mohammad Ali Farrokhian =

Iranian wrestler (1935–2022)

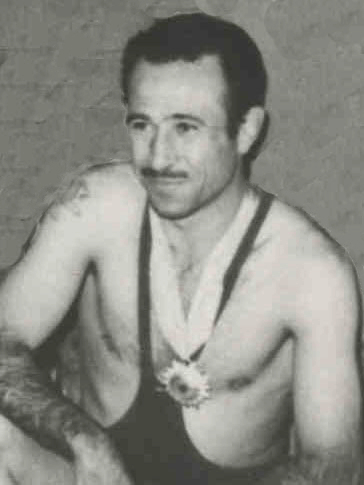
- Farrokhian in the 1960s

Personal information
- Born: 1935 Shiraz, Iran
- Died: 27 January 2022 (aged 86)

Sport
- Sport: Freestyle wrestling
Medal record
Representing Iran
World Championships
Silver medal – second place	1965 Manchester	-57 kg
Asian Games
Silver medal – second place	1966 Bangkok	-57 kg

Mohammad Ali Farrokhian (Persian: محمد علی فرخیان, 1935 – 27 January 2022) was an Iranian freestyle wrestler. He won silver medals in the 57 kg division at the 1965 World Wrestling Championships and 1966 Asian Games. Farrokhian died on 27 January 2022, at the age of 86.
