= 1959 World Wrestling Championships =

- Host city: Tehran, Iran
- Dates: 1–4 October 1959
- Stadium: Soraya Hall

Champions
- Freestyle: Soviet Union

The 1959 World Freestyle Wrestling Championship were held in Tehran, Iran from 1 to 4 October 1959.

== Medal table ==
Rank	Nation	Gold	Silver	Bronze	Total
1	Soviet Union	3	1	2	6
2	Turkey	2	2	2	6
3	Iran	2	0	0	2
4	Bulgaria	1	3	0	4
5	Finland	0	1	0	1
5	Hungary	0	1	0	1
7	Pakistan	0	0	2	2
8	East Germany	0	0	1	1
8	France	0	0	1	1
Totals (9 entries)		8	8	8	24

== Team ranking ==
Rank	Men's freestyle	
Rank	Team	Points
1	Soviet Union	36
2	Turkey	33
3	Bulgaria	22
4	Iran	20

== Medal summary ==
Event	Gold	Silver	Bronze
Flyweight; 52 kg	Ali Aliev; Soviet Union	Ahmet Bilek; Turkey	Muhammad Niaz Din; Pakistan
Bantamweight; 57 kg	Hüseyin Akbaş; Turkey	Tauno Jaskari; Finland	Vladimir Arsenyan; Soviet Union
Featherweight; 62 kg	Mustafa Dağıstanlı; Turkey	Stancho Kolev; Bulgaria	Muhammad Akhtar; Pakistan
Lightweight; 67 kg	Vladimir Sinyavsky; Soviet Union	Enyu Valchev; Bulgaria	Hayrullah Şahinkaya; Turkey
Welterweight; 73 kg	Emam-Ali Habibi; Iran	Vakhtang Balavadze; Soviet Union	İsmail Ogan; Turkey
Middleweight; 79 kg	Georgy Skhirtladze; Soviet Union	Géza Hollósi; Hungary	Lothar Lippa; East Germany
Light heavyweight 87 kg	Gholamreza Takhti; Iran	Petko Sirakov; Bulgaria	Maurice Jacquel; France
Heavyweight +87 kg	Lyutvi Ahmedov; Bulgaria	Hamit Kaplan; Turkey	Savkuz Dzarasov; Soviet Union
