= Hayrullah Şahinkaya =

Turkish wrestler (1934–2020)

Personal information
- Nationality: Turkish
- Born: 1 February 1934 Amasya, Turkey
- Died: 2020 (aged 85–86)

Sport
- Sport: Freestyle wrestling
Medal record
Representing Turkey
World Championships
Silver medal – second place	1957 istanbul	67 kg
Bronze medal – third place	1959 tehran	67 kg

Hayrullah Şahinkaya (1 February 1934 – 2020) was a Turkish wrestler. He competed at the 1960 Summer Olympics and the 1964 Summer Olympics.
