= 1963 World Wrestling Championships =

Freestyle
- Host city: Sofia, Bulgaria
- Dates: 31 May – 2 June 1963

Greco-Roman
- Host city: Helsingborg, Sweden
- Dates: 1–3 July 1963

Champions
- Freestyle: Soviet Union
- Greco-Roman: Soviet Union

The following is the final results of the 1963 World Wrestling Championships. Freestyle competition were held in Sofia, Bulgaria and Greco-Roman competition were held in Helsingborg, Sweden.

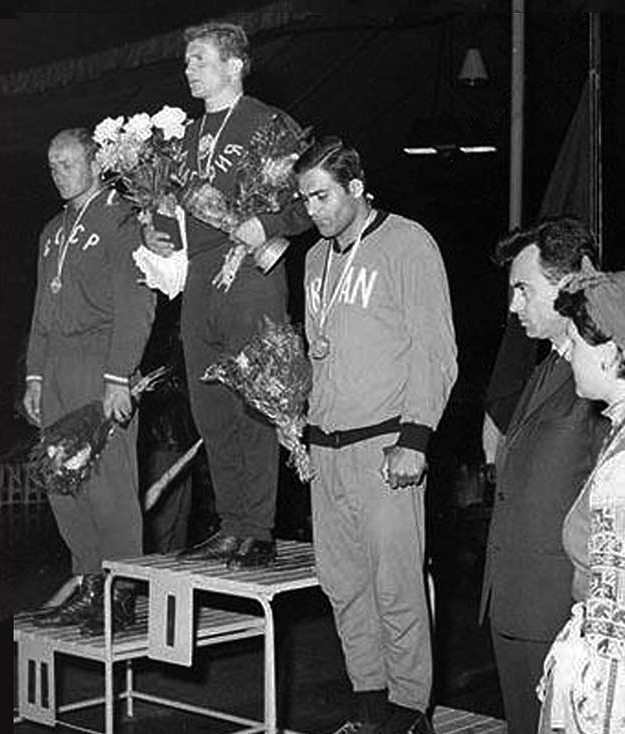
Medal winners of freestyle 87 kg. From left to right, Anatoly Albul, Prodan Gardzhev and Mansour Mehdizadeh

== Medal table ==
Rank	Nation	Gold	Silver	Bronze	Total
1	Soviet Union	8	4	1	13
2	Japan	2	1	0	3
2	Yugoslavia	2	1	0	3
4	Turkey	2	0	3	5
5	Bulgaria	1	3	5	9
6	Hungary	1	1	2	4
7	Iran	0	1	1	2
7	Sweden	0	1	1	2
9	Czechoslovakia	0	1	0	1
9	East Germany	0	1	0	1
9	Italy	0	1	0	1
9	Romania	0	1	0	1
13	United States	0	0	2	2
14	West Germany	0	0	1	1
Totals (14 entries)		16	16	16	48

== Team ranking ==
Rank	Men's freestyle		Men's Greco-Roman	
Rank	Team	Points	Team	Points
1	Soviet Union	39	Soviet Union	37.5
2	Bulgaria	33.5	Hungary	18.5
3	Turkey	24	Yugoslavia	17
4	Japan	23	Sweden	16.5
5	Iran	13.5	Bulgaria	14.5
6	United States	11.5	Turkey	13

== Medal summary ==
=== Freestyle ===
Event	Gold	Silver	Bronze
Flyweight; 52 kg	Cemal Yanılmaz; Turkey	Ali Aliev; Soviet Union	Stoyko Malov; Bulgaria
Bantamweight; 57 kg	Aydin Ibrahimov; Soviet Union	Hiroshi Ikeda; Japan	Mladen Georgiev; Bulgaria
Featherweight; 63 kg	Osamu Watanabe; Japan	Ebrahim Seifpour; Iran	Stancho Kolev; Bulgaria
Lightweight; 70 kg	Iwao Horiuchi; Japan	Zarbeg Beriashvili; Soviet Union	Gregory Ruth; United States
Welterweight; 78 kg	Guram Sagaradze; Soviet Union	Petko Dermendzhiev; Bulgaria	İsmail Ogan; Turkey
Middleweight; 87 kg	Prodan Gardzhev; Bulgaria	Anatoly Albul; Soviet Union	Mansour Mehdizadeh; Iran
Light heavyweight 97 kg	Aleksandr Medved; Soviet Union	Valko Kostov; Bulgaria	Hamit Kaplan; Turkey
Heavyweight +97 kg	Aleksandr Ivanitsky; Soviet Union	Lyutvi Ahmedov; Bulgaria	János Reznák; Hungary

=== Greco-Roman ===
Event	Gold	Silver	Bronze
Flyweight; 52 kg	Borivoj Vukov; Yugoslavia	Ignazio Fabra; Italy	Sergey Rybalko; Soviet Union
Bantamweight; 57 kg	János Varga; Hungary	Jiří Švec; Czechoslovakia	Dinko Petrov; Bulgaria
Featherweight; 63 kg	Gennady Sapunov; Soviet Union	Imre Polyák; Hungary	Ivan Ivanov; Bulgaria
Lightweight; 70 kg	Stevan Horvat; Yugoslavia	David Gvantseladze; Soviet Union	Klaus Rost; West Germany
Welterweight; 78 kg	Anatoly Kolesov; Soviet Union	Rudolf Vesper; East Germany	Bertil Nyström; Sweden
Middleweight; 87 kg	Tevfik Kış; Turkey	Branislav Simić; Yugoslavia	György Gurics; Hungary
Light heavyweight 97 kg	Rostom Abashidze; Soviet Union	Nicolae Martinescu; Romania	Hamit Kaplan; Turkey
Heavyweight +97 kg	Anatoly Roshchin; Soviet Union	Ragnar Svensson; Sweden	James Raschke; United States
