= Phil Oberlander =

Canadian wrestler (born 1939)

Personal information
- Nationality: Canadian
- Born: 17 August 1939 (age 86) London, England
- Home town: Rosemère, Quebec, Canada

Sport
- Country: Canada
- Sport: Wrestling
- Events: Greco-Roman, Freestyle, and Folkstyle
- College team: Cornell
Medal record
Representing Canada
Maccabiah Games
Men's Greco-Roman wrestling
Gold medal – first place	1961 Tel Aviv	Middleweight

Phil Oberlander (born 17 August 1939) is a Canadian wrestler. At the 1961 Maccabiah Games in Israel, he won a gold medal in the middleweight class in Greco-Roman wrestling. Collegiately, Oberlander wrestled at Cornell University. He competed in the men's freestyle welterweight division at the 1964 Summer Olympics, representing Canada.
