= Zarbeg Beriashvili =

Georgian wrestler (1939–2020)

Personal information
- Nationality: Georgian
- Born: 10 September 1939 Tbilisi, Georgian SSR, Soviet Union
- Died: 22 April 2020 (aged 80)

Sport
- Sport: Wrestling
Medal record
World Championships
Representing the Soviet Union
| Gold medal – first place | 1969 Mar del Plata | 74 kg |
| Silver medal – second place | 1963 Sofia | 70 kg |
| Silver medal – second place | 1967 New Delhi | 70 kg |
| Bronze medal – third place | 1965 Manchester | 70 kg |
European Championships
| Gold medal – first place | 1966 Karlsruhe | 70 kg |
| Gold medal – first place | 1967 Istanbul | 70 kg |
| Gold medal – first place | 1970 East Berlin | 74 kg |

Zarbeg Beriashvili (10 September 1939 – 22 April 2020) was a Georgian wrestler. He competed at the 1964 Summer Olympics and the 1968 Summer Olympics.
