= Petko Dermendzhiev =

Bulgarian wrestler

Personal information
- Nationality: Bulgarian
- Born: 13 February 1936 (age 90)

Sport
- Sport: Wrestling
Medal record
Representing Bulgaria
World Championships
Silver medal – second place	1962 Toledo	78 kg
Silver medal – second place	1963 Sofia	78 kg

Petko Dermendzhiev (born 13 February 1936) is a Bulgarian wrestler. He competed in the men's freestyle welterweight at the 1964 Summer Olympics.
