= Mohammad Ali Sanatkaran =

Iranian wrestler (born 1938)

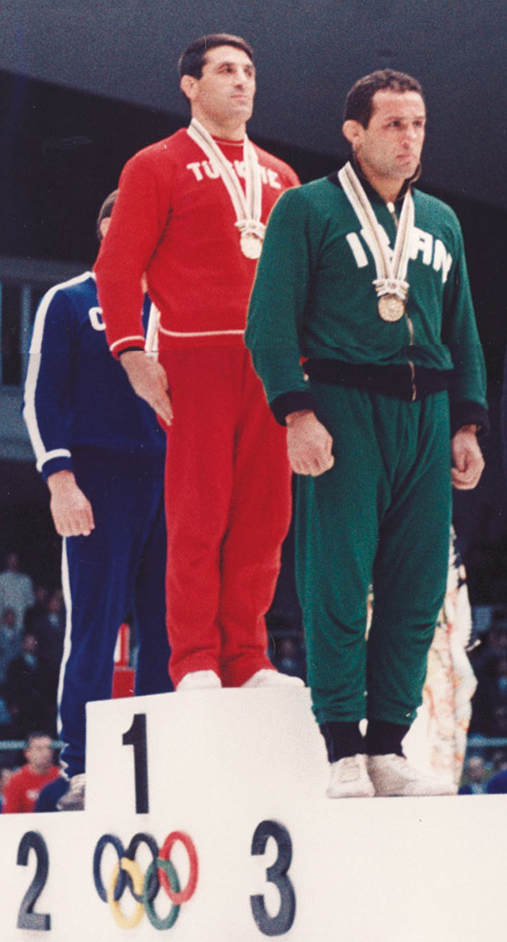
- Sanatkaran (right) at the 1964 Olympics

Personal information
- Born: 18 March 1938 Tehran, Iran
- Height: 175 cm (5 ft 9 in)

Sport
- Sport: Freestyle wrestling
Medal record
Representing Iran
Olympic Games
Bronze medal – third place	1964 Tokyo	78 kg
World Championships
Gold medal – first place	1961 Yokohama	67 kg
Silver medal – second place	1965 Manchester	78 kg

Mohammad Ali Sanatkaran (Persian: محمدعلی صنعتكاران, born 18 March 1938) is a retired Iranian freestyle wrestler. He won a gold and a silver medal at the world championships in 1961 and 1965, and a bronze medal at the 1964 Olympics.
