= Muhammad Afzal (wrestler) =

Pakistani wrestler (1939–2020)

Personal information
- Nationality: Pakistan
- Born: 7 April 1939; British Raj
- Died: 21 April 2020 (aged 81); New York City, USA
- Height: 1.69 m (5 ft 7 in)
- Weight: 78 kg (172 lb)

Sport
- Sport: Wrestling

Muhammad Afzal (7 April 1939 – 21 April 2020) was a Pakistani wrestler. He competed in the 1964 Summer Olympics.

Afzal died from the effects of COVID-19 during the COVID-19 pandemic in New York City.
