= Yasuo Watanabe =

Japanese wrestler

Personal information
- Nationality: Japanese
- Born: 21 February 1944 (age 82)

Sport
- Sport: Wrestling

Yasuo Watanabe (渡辺 保夫, Watanabe Yasuo; born 21 February 1944) is a Japanese wrestler. He competed in the men's freestyle welterweight at the 1964 Summer Olympics.
