= Karl Dodrimont =

German wrestler (born 1939)

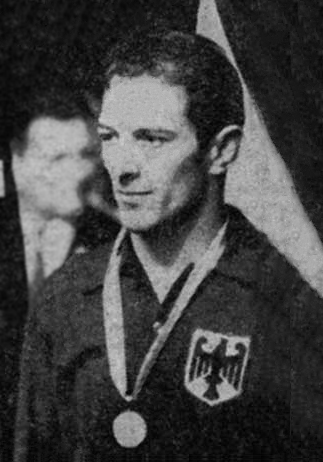
- Dodrimont at the 1965 World Championships

Personal information
- Born: 14 January 1939 (age 87) Baienfurt, Germany
- Height: 165 cm (5 ft 5 in)

Sport
- Sport: Freestyle wrestling
- Club: SG Baienfurt
Medal record
Representing West Germany
World Championships
Bronze medal – third place	1965 Manchester	-57 kg

Karl Dodrimont (born 14 January 1939) is a retired bantamweight freestyle wrestler from West Germany. He won a bronze medal at the 1965 World Championships and placed sixth at the world and European championships in 1966. He also competed at the 1964 Summer Olympics.
