= Muhammad Niaz Din =

Pakistani wrestler (born 1940)

Muhammad Niaz-Din
Personal information
- Nationality: Pakistani
- Born: 10 July 1940 (age 86)

Sport
- Sport: Wrestling
Medal record
World Championships
Bronze medal – third place	1959 Tehran	52 kg
Commonwealth Games
Gold medal – first place	1962 Perth	52 kg

Muhammad Niaz-Din (born 10 July 1940) is a Pakistani wrestler. He competed in the men's freestyle flyweight at the 1964 Summer Olympics. At the 1962 British Empire and Commonwealth Games in Perth, Niaz-Din won the gold medal in the flyweight category alongside a similarly named Pakistani wrestler, Muhammad Niaz, who won the men's heavyweight event.
