= List of Commonwealth Games medallists in wrestling =

This is the complete list of Commonwealth Games medallists in wrestling from 1930 to 2014.

== Men's freestyle ==
=== Light flyweight ===
Games	Gold	Silver	Bronze
1970	Ved Prakash (IND)	Ken Shand (CAN)	Masih Sadiq (PAK)
1970	Ved Prakash (IND)	Ken Shand (CAN)	Don Urquhart (SCO)
1974	Mitchell Kawasaki (CAN)	Wally Koenig (AUS)	Radhey Shyam (IND)
1978	Ashok Kumar (IND)	George Gunouski (CAN)	Mark Dunbar (ENG)
1982	Ram Chander Sarang (IND)	Steve Reinsfield (NZL)	Maldwyn Cooper (CAN)
1986	Ron Moncur (CAN)	Duncan Burns (ENG)	David Connelly (SCO)
1994	Isaac Jacob (NGR)	Paul Ragusa (CAN)	Ramesh Kumar (IND)

=== Flyweight ===
Games	Gold	Silver	Bronze
1950	Bert Harris (AUS)	Eric Matthews (NZL)	none awarded
1954	Louis Baise (SAF)	Fred Flannery (AUS)	Mohammad Din (PAK)
1958	Ian Epton (SAF)	Shujah-ud-Din (PAK)	Fred Flannery (CAN)
1962	Muhammad Niaz-Din (PAK)	Peter Michienzi (CAN)	Warren Nisbet (NZL)
1966	Muhammad Nazir (PAK)	Shamrao Sable (IND)	Peter Michienzi (CAN)
1970	Sudesh Kumar (IND)	Muhammad Nazir (PAK)	David Stitt (CAN)
1974	Sudesh Kumar (IND)	Gordon Bertie (CAN)	John Navie (AUS)
1978	Ray Takahashi (CAN)	Sudesh Kumar (IND)	Ken Hoyt (AUS)
1982	Mahabir Singh (IND)	Ray Takahashi (CAN)	Ken Hoyt (AUS)
1986	Chris Woodcroft (CAN)	James McAlary (AUS)	Nigel Donahue (ENG)
1994	Selwyn Tam (CAN)	Andrew Hutchinson (ENG)	Kirpa Shankar (IND)

=== Bantamweight ===
Games	Gold	Silver	Bronze
1930	James Trifunov (CAN)	Joseph Reid (ENG)	none awarded
1934	Edward Melrose (SCO)	Ted McKinley (CAN)	Joseph Reid (ENG)
1938	Ted Purcell (AUS)	Vernon Blake (CAN)	Ray Cazaux (ENG)
1950	Douglas Mudgway (NZL)	Jim Chapman (AUS)	none awarded
1954	Geoff Jameson (AUS)	Muhammad Amin (PAK)	Ian Epton (NRH)
1958	Muhammad Akhtar (PAK)	Geoff Jameson (AUS)	Daniel van der Walt (SAF)
1962	Siraj-ud-Din (PAK)	Walter Pilling (ENG)	James Turnbull (SCO)
1966	Bishambar Singh (IND)	Kevin McGrath (AUS)	Muhammad Saeed (PAK)
1970	Muhammad Sardar (PAK)	Herbert Singerman (CAN)	Terence Robinson (ENG)
1974	Prem Nath (IND)	Amrik Singh (ENG)	Kevin Burke (AUS)
1978	Satbir Singh (IND)	Michael Barry (CAN)	Amrik Singh (ENG)
1982	Brian Aspen (ENG)	Ashok Kumar (IND)	Chris Maddock (NZL)
1986	Mitch Ostberg (CAN)	Steve Reinsfield (NZL)	Brian Aspen (ENG)
1994	Robert Dawson (CAN)	Ashok Kumar Garg (IND)	Cory O'Brien (AUS)
2002	Krishnan Kumar (IND)	Mikheil Japaridze (CAN)	Shaun Williams (RSA)
2010	Azhar Hussain (PAK)	Ebikewenimo Welson (NGR)	Anil Kumar (IND)
2014	Amit Kumar (IND)	Ebikewenimo Welson (NGR)	Azhar Hussain (PAK)
2014	Amit Kumar (IND)	Ebikewenimo Welson (NGR)	Craig Pilling (WAL)

=== Featherweight ===
Games	Gold	Silver	Bronze
1930	Cliff Chilcott (CAN)	none awarded	none awarded
1934	Robert McNab (CAN)	Joe Nelson (ENG)	Murdoch White (SCO)
1938	Roy Purchase (ENG)	Larry Clarke (CAN)	Joe Genet (NZL)
1950	John Armitt (NZL)	Roland Milord (CAN)	Arnold Parsons (ENG)
1954	Abraham Geldenhuys (SAF)	Herbie Hall (ENG)	John Armitt (NZL)
1958	Abraham Geldenhuys (SAF)	Siraj-ud-Din (PAK)	Albert Aspen (ENG)
1962	Ala-ud-Din (PAK)	Matti Jutila (CAN)	Albert Aspen (ENG)
1966	Muhammad Akhtar (PAK)	Randhawa Singh (IND)	Albert Aspen (ENG)
1970	Muhammad Saeed (PAK)	Patrick Bolger (CAN)	Randhawa Singh (IND)
1974	Egon Beiler (CAN)	Shivaji Chingle (IND)	Ray Brown (AUS)
1978	Egon Beiler (CAN)	Jagmander Singh (IND)	Brian Aspen (ENG)
1982	Bob Robinson (CAN)	Cris Brown (AUS)	Augustine Atasie (NGR)
1986	Paul Hughes (CAN)	Dan Cumming (AUS)	Stephen Bell (NZL)
1994	Marty Calder (CAN)	John Melling (ENG)	Arout Parsekian (CYP)
2002	Guivi Sissaouri (CAN)	Shokinder Tomar (IND)	Tebe Dorgu (NGR)
2010	Yogeshwar Dutt (IND)	James Mancini (CAN)	Sasha Madyarchyk (ENG)
2014	David Tremblay (CAN)	Bajrang Punia (IND)	Viorel Etko (SCO)
2014	David Tremblay (CAN)	Bajrang Punia (IND)	Amas Daniel (NGR)

=== Lightweight ===
Games	Gold	Silver	Bronze
1930	Howard Thomas (CAN)	Harold Angus (ENG)	none awarded
1934	Dick Garrard (AUS)	G. E. North (ENG)	Howard Thomas (CAN)
1938	Dick Garrard (AUS)	Vernon Thomas (NZL)	Alfred Harding (SAF)
1950	Dick Garrard (AUS)	Morgan Plumb (CAN)	Gordon Hobson (NZL)
1954	Godfrey Pienaar (SAF)	Ruby Leobovitch (CAN)	Dick Garrard (AUS)
1958	Muhammad Ashraf (PAK)	Alastair Duncan (SCO)	Anthony Ries (SAF)
1962	Muhammad Ashraf (PAK)	Sid Marsh (AUS)	Kurt Boese (CAN)
1966	Mukhtiar Singh (IND)	Ray Lougheed (CAN)	Tony Greig (NZL)
1970	Udey Chand (IND)	Muhammad Yaghoub (PAK)	Ole Sorensen (CAN)
1974	Jagrup Singh (IND)	Joe Gilligan (ENG)	Stephen Martin (CAN)
1978	Zsigmond Kelevitz (AUS)	Joe Gilligan (ENG)	Jagdish Kumar (IND)
1982	Jagmander Singh (IND)	Zsigmond Kelevitz (AUS)	Lloyd Renken (CAN)
1986	David McKay (CAN)	Zsigmond Kelevitz (AUS)	Stephen Cooper (ENG)
1994	Chris Wilson (CAN)	Ibo Oziti (NGR)	Muhammad Umar (PAK)
2002	Ramesh Kumar (IND)	Graham Ewers (CAN)	Fred Jessey (NGR)
2010	Sushil Kumar (IND)	Heinrich Barnes (RSA)	Chris Prickett (CAN)
2014	Yogeshwar Dutt (IND)	Jevon Balfour (CAN)	Sampson Clarkson (NGR)
2014	Yogeshwar Dutt (IND)	Jevon Balfour (CAN)	Alex Gladkov (SCO)

=== Welterweight ===
Games	Gold	Silver	Bronze
1930	Reg Priestly (CAN)	Harry Johnson (ENG)	none awarded
1934	Joe Schleimer (CAN)	William Fox (ENG)	Rashid Anwar (IND)
1938	Tom Trevaskis (AUS)	Felix Stander (SAF)	Jerry Podjursky (NZL)
1950	Henry Hudson (CAN)	Jack Little (AUS)	Martin Jooste (SAF)
1954	Nick Loubser (SAF)	Abdul Rashid (PAK)	Ray Myland (ENG)
1958	Muhammad Bashir (PAK)	Lakhshmi Kant Pandey (IND)	Coenraad de Villiers (SAF)
1962	Muhammad Bashir (PAK)	Philip Oberlander (CAN)	Len Allen (ENG)
1966	Muhammad Bashir (PAK)	Richard Bryant (CAN)	Hukum Singh (IND)
1970	Mukhtiar Singh (IND)	Alfred Wurr (CAN)	Gordon Mackay (NZL)
1974	Raghunath Pawar (IND)	Tony Shacklady (ENG)	Gordon Mackay (NZL)
1978	Rajinder Singh (IND)	Victor Zilberman (CAN)	Keith Haward (ENG)
1982	Rajinder Singh (IND)	Ken Reinsfield (NZL)	Brian Renken (CAN)
1986	Gary Holmes (CAN)	George Marsh (AUS)	Fitzloyd Walker (ENG)
1994	David Hohl (CAN)	Rein Ozoline (AUS)	Calum McNeil (SCO)
2002	Daniel Igali (CAN)	Sunday Opiah (NGR)	Rein Ozoline (AUS)
2010	Narsingh Pancham Yadav (IND)	Richard Addinall (RSA)	Evan MacDonald (CAN)
2014	Sushil Kumar (IND)	Qamar Abbas (PAK)	Mike Grundy (ENG)
2014	Sushil Kumar (IND)	Qamar Abbas (PAK)	Melvin Bibo (NGR)

=== Middleweight ===
Games	Gold	Silver	Bronze
1930	Mike Chepwick (CAN)	Stanley Bissell (ENG)	Max Thiel (SAF)
1934	Terry Evans (CAN)	Stanley Bissell (ENG)	Robert Harcus (SCO)
1938	Terry Evans (CAN)	Peter Sheasby (SAF)	Leslie Jeffers (ENG)
1950	Maurice Vachon (CAN)	Bruce Arthur (AUS)	Carel Reitz (SAF)
1954	Hermanus van Zyl (SAF)	Jim Christie (CAN)	Harry Kendall (ENG)
1958	Hermanus van Zyl (SAF)	George Farquhar (SCO)	Ray Myland (ENG)
1962	Faiz Muhammad (PAK)	Michael Benarik (AUS)	Fred Thomas (NZL)
1966	Faiz Muhammad (PAK)	Sébastien Donison (CAN)	Michael Benarik (AUS)
1970	Harishchandra Birajdar (IND)	Nick Schori (CAN)	David Aspin (NZL)
1970	Harishchandra Birajdar (IND)	Nick Schori (CAN)	Ron Grinstead (ENG)
1974	David Aspin (NZL)	Satpal Singh (IND)	Taras Hryb (CAN)
1978	Richard Deschatelets (CAN)	Wally Koenig (AUS)	Ivan Weir (NIR)
1982	Christopher Rinke (CAN)	Wally Koenig (AUS)	Jai Prakash (IND)
1986	Christopher Rinke (CAN)	Wally Koenig (AUS)	Tony Bull (ENG)
1994	Justin Abdou (CAN)	Randhir Singh (IND)	Muhammad Bhola (PAK)
2002	Nicholas Ugoalah (CAN)	Anuj Kumar (IND)	Sinivie Boltic (NGR)
2010	Muhammad Inam (PAK)	Anuj Kumar (IND)	Andrew Dick (NGR)
2014	Tamerlan Tagziev (CAN)	Andrew Dick (NGR)	Armando Hietbrink (RSA)
2014	Tamerlan Tagziev (CAN)	Andrew Dick (NGR)	Pawan Kumar (IND)

=== Light heavyweight ===
Games	Gold	Silver	Bronze
1930	Bill McIntyre (CAN)	Edgar Bacon (ENG)	none awarded
1934	Mick Cubbin (SAF)	Bernard Rowe (ENG)	Alex Watt (CAN)
1938	Eddie Scarf (AUS)	Sidney Greenspan (SAF)	Thomas Ward (SCO)
1950	Patrick Morton (SAF)	Arthur Sneddon (NZL)	Tom Trevaskis (AUS)
1954	Jacob Theron (SAF)	Robert Steckle (CAN)	Dan van Staden (NRH)
1958	Jacob Theron (SAF)	Muhammad Ali (PAK)	Robert Steckle (CAN)
1962	Tony Buck (ENG)	Muhammad Saeed (PAK)	Jim Armstrong (AUS)
1966	Robert Chamberot (CAN)	Wallace Booth (SCO)	Bishwanath Singh (IND)
1970	Faiz Muhammad (PAK)	Sajan Singh (IND)	Claude Pilon (CAN)
1974	Terry Paice (CAN)	Netra Pal Singh (IND)	Maurice Allan (SCO)
1978	Steve Daniar (CAN)	Mick Pikos (AUS)	Kartar Singh (IND)
1982	Clark Davis (CAN)	Kartar Singh (IND)	Nigel Sargeant (NZL)
1986	Noel Loban (ENG)	Doug Cox (CAN)	Graeme English (SCO)
1994	Scott Bianco (CAN)	Victor Kodei (NGR)	Graeme English (SCO)

=== Heavyweight ===
Games	Gold	Silver	Bronze
1930	Earl McCready (CAN)	Albert Sangwine (ENG)	none awarded
1934	Jack Knight (AUS)	Pat Meehan (CAN)	Archie Dudgeon (SCO)
1938	Jack Knight (AUS)	Jim Dryden (NZL)	John Whelan (CAN)
1950	Jim Armstrong (AUS)	Pat O'Connor (NZL)	Kenneth Richmond (ENG)
1954	Kenneth Richmond (ENG)	Keith Maltman (CAN)	
1958	Lila Ram Sangwan (IND)	Jacobus Hanekom (SAF)	Ray Mitchell (AUS)
1962	Muhammad Niaz (PAK)	Ray Mitchell (AUS)	Denis McNamara (ENG)
1966	Bhim Singh (IND)	Ikram Ilahi (PAK)	Denis McNamara (ENG)
1970	Ed Millard (CAN)	Bishwanath Singh (IND)	Muhammad Riaz (PAK)
1974	Claude Pilon (CAN)	Dadu Chaugule (IND)	Ian Duncan (SCO)
1978	Wyatt Wishart (CAN)	Satpal Singh (IND)	Murray Avery (NZL)
1982	Richard Deschatelets (CAN)	Satpal Singh (IND)	Murray Avery (AUS)
1986	Clark Davis (CAN)	Robert Algie (NZL)	David Kilpin (ENG)
1994	Gregory Edgelow (CAN)	Noel Loban (ENG)	Subhash Verma (IND)
2002	Dean Schmeichel (CAN)	Anil Kumar Mann (IND)	Muhammad Bashir Bhola (PAK)
2010	Sinivie Boltic (NGR)	Korey Jarvis (CAN)	Leon Rattigan (ENG)
2014	Arjun Gill (CAN)	Satyawart Kadian (IND)	Sam Belkin (NZL)
2014	Arjun Gill (CAN)	Satyawart Kadian (IND)	Leon Rattigan (ENG)

=== Super heavyweight ===
Games	Gold	Silver	Bronze
1970	Ikram Ilahi (PAK)	Maruti Mane (IND)	Denis McNamara (ENG)
1974	Bill Benko (CAN)	Bishwanath Singh (IND)	Gary Knight (NZL)
1978	Robert Gibbons (CAN)	Albert Patrick (SCO)	Ishwar Singh (IND)
1982	Wyatt Wishart (CAN)	Rajinder Singh (IND)	Albert Patrick (SCO)
1986	Wayne Brightwell (CAN)	Albert Patrick (SCO)	Keith Peache (ENG)
1994	Andrew Borodow (CAN)	Jackson Bidei (NGR)	Amarjit Singh (ENG)
2002	Palwinder Singh Cheema (IND)	Eric Kirschner (CAN)	Mushtaq Rasem Abdullah (AUS)
2010	Arjan Bhullar (CAN)	Joginder Kumar (IND)	Hugues Onanena (CMR)
2014	Korey Jarvis (CAN)	Rajiv Tomar (IND)	Chinu Xxx (ENG)
2014	Korey Jarvis (CAN)	Rajiv Tomar (IND)	Sinivie Boltic (NGR)
2018	Sumit Malik (IND)	Korey Jarvis (CAN)	Tayab Raza (PAK)

== Men's Greco-Roman ==
=== 55 kg ===
Games	Gold	Silver	Bronze
2010	Rajender Kumar (IND)	Azhar Hussain (PAK)	Promise Mwenga (CAN)

=== 60 kg ===
Games	Gold	Silver	Bronze
2010	Ravinder Singh (IND)	Terence Bosson (ENG)	Romeo Joseph (NGR)

=== 66 kg ===
Games	Gold	Silver	Bronze
2010	Myroslav Dykun (ENG)	Jack Bond (CAN)	Sunil Kumar (IND)

=== 74 kg ===
Games	Gold	Silver	Bronze
2010	Sanjay Kumar (IND)	Richard Addinall (RSA)	Hassan Shahsavan (AUS)

=== 84 kg ===
Games	Gold	Silver	Bronze
2010	Efionayi Agbonavbare (NGR)	Manoj Kumar (IND)	Dean van Zyl (RSA)

=== 96 kg ===
Games	Gold	Silver	Bronze
2010	Anil Kumar (IND)	Kakoma Hugues Bella-Lufu (RSA)	Eric Feunekes (CAN)

=== 120 kg ===
Games	Gold	Silver	Bronze
2010	Ivan Popov (AUS)	Talaram Mamma (NGR)	Dharmender Dalal (IND)

== Women's freestyle ==
=== 48 kg ===
Games	Gold	Silver	Bronze
2010	Carol Huynh (CAN)	Nirmala Devi (IND)	Odunayo Adekuoroye (NGR)
2014	Vinesh Phogat (IND)	Yana Rattigan (ENG)	Jasmine Mian (CAN)
2014	Vinesh Phogat (IND)	Yana Rattigan (ENG)	Rebecca Muambo (CMR)

=== 51-53 kg ===
Games	Gold	Silver	Bronze
2010	Ifeoma Christiana Nwoye (NGR)	Babita Kumari (IND)	Jessica MacDonald (CAN)
2014	Odunayo Adekuoroye (NGR)	Lalita Sehrawat (IND)	Jillian Gallays (CAN)
2014	Odunayo Adekuoroye (NGR)	Lalita Sehrawat (IND)	Mpho Madi (RSA)

=== 55 kg ===
Games	Gold	Silver	Bronze
2010	Geeta Phogat (IND)	Emily Bensted (AUS)	Lovina Edward (NGR)
2014	Babita Kumari (IND)	Brittanee Laverdure (CAN)	Ifeoma Nwoye (NGR)
2014	Babita Kumari (IND)	Brittanee Laverdure (CAN)	Louisa Porogovska (ENG)

=== 58-59 kg ===
Games	Gold	Silver	Bronze
2010	Alka Tomar (IND)	Tonya Verbeek (CAN)	Tega Tosin Richard (NGR)
2014	Aminat Adeniyi (NGR)	Sakshi Malik (IND)	Braxton Stone-Papadopoulos (CAN)
2014	Aminat Adeniyi (NGR)	Sakshi Malik (IND)	Tayla Ford (NZL)

=== 63 kg ===
Games	Gold	Silver	Bronze
2010	Justine Bouchard (CAN)	Blessing Oborududu (NGR)	Suman Kundu (IND)
2014	Danielle Lappage (CAN)	Geetika Jakhar (IND)	Blessing Oborududu (NGR)
2014	Danielle Lappage (CAN)	Geetika Jakhar (IND)	Blandine Metala Epanga (CMR)

=== 67-69 kg ===
Games	Gold	Silver	Bronze
2010	Anita Sheoran (IND)	Megan Buydens (CAN)	Ifeoma Iheanacho (NGR)
2014	Dorothy Yeats (CAN)	Angele Tomo (CMR)	Navjot Kaur (IND)
2014	Dorothy Yeats (CAN)	Angele Tomo (CMR)	Hannah Rueben (NGR)

=== 72-75 kg ===
Games	Gold	Silver	Bronze
2010	Ohenewa Akuffo (CAN)	Annabelle Ali (CMR)	Hellen Okus (NGR)
2014	Erica Wiebe (CAN)	Annabelle Ali (CMR)	Blessing Onyebuchi (NGR)
2014	Erica Wiebe (CAN)	Annabelle Ali (CMR)	Not awarded
