= India at the 1978 Commonwealth Games =

- CG code: IND
- CGA: Indian Olympic Association
- Website: olympic.ind.in

in Edmonton, Alberta, Canada
- Competitors: 47 in 9 sports
- Medals Ranked 6th: Gold 5 Silver 5 Bronze 5 Total 15

Commonwealth Games appearances (overview)
- 1934; 1938; 1950; 1954; 1958; 1962; 1966; 1970; 1974; 1978; 1982; 1986; 1990; 1994; 1998; 2002; 2006; 2010; 2014; 2018; 2022; 2026; 2030

India competed at the 1978 Commonwealth Games in Edmonton, Canada, held from 3 to 12 August 1978. It was India's eighth appearance at the Commonwealth Games. The Indian contingent consisted of 47 competitors who competed across ten sports. India finished sixth in the medal table, winning a total of 15 medals, including five gold, five silver and five bronze medals.

== Medallists ==
India won fifteen medals, including five gold, five silver, and five bronze medals, and finished sixth in the overall medal table. Wrestling was India's most successful sport, contributing nine medals.

Prakash Padukone won India's first Commonwealth Games gold medal in badminton, winning the men's singles competition. Ekambaram Karunakaran won the gold medal in the men's flyweight in weightlifting. Badminton players Ami Ghia and Kanwal Thakar Singh were the first Indian women to win a Commonwealth Games medal, winning the women's doubles bronze during the 1978 Games.

Medal	Name	Sport	Event
(gold) Gold	Prakash Padukone	Badminton	Men's singles
(gold) Gold	Ekambaram Karunakaran	Weightlifting	Flyweight 52 kg
(gold) Gold	Ashok Kumar	Wrestling	Light flyweight 48 kg
(gold) Gold	Satbir Singh	Wrestling	Bantamweight 57 kg
(gold) Gold	Rajinder Singh	Wrestling	Welterweight 74 kg
(silver) Silver	Tamil Selvan	Weightlifting	Bantamweight 56 kg
(silver) Silver	Sudesh Kumar	Wrestling	Flyweight 52 kg
(silver) Silver	Jagminder Singh	Wrestling	Featherweight 62 kg
(silver) Silver	Jagdish Kumar	Wrestling	Lightweight 68 kg
(silver) Silver	Satpal Singh	Wrestling	Heavyweight 100 kg
(bronze) Bronze	Suresh Babu	Athletics	Men's long jump
(bronze) Bronze	Ami Ghia; Kanwal Thakar Singh	Badminton	Women's doubles
(bronze) Bronze	Birender Singh Thapa	Boxing	Light flyweight 48 kg
(bronze) Bronze	Kartar Singh	Wrestling	Light heavyweight 90 kg
(bronze) Bronze	Ishwar Singh	Wrestling	Super heavyweight +100 kg

== Competitors ==
The Indian contingent consisted of 47 competitors who competed across ten sports.

Sport	Men	Women	Total
Athletics	10	0	10
Badminton	4	2	6
Boxing	4	—N/a	4
Cycling	1	—N/a	1
Diving	2	0	2
Gymnastics	5	0	5
Shooting	5	0	5
Weightlifting	4	—N/a	4
Wrestling	10	—N/a	10
Total	45	2	47

== Athletics ==
Suresh Babu won the bronze medal in the men's long jump with a distance of 7.94 m (26.0 ft).

=== Track ===
Athlete	Event	Heat		Quarterfinal		Semifinal		Final	
Athlete	Event	Result	Rank	Result	Rank	Result	Rank	Result	Rank
Ramaswamy Gnanasekharan	Men's 100 metres	10.94	5 Q	10.86	7	Did not qualify			
Ramaswamy Gnanasekharan	Men's 200 metres	21.60	3 Q	21.96	8	Did not qualify			
Satbir Singh	Men's 110 metres hurdles	15.33	8	—N/a				Did not qualify	
Shivnath Singh	Men's 10,000 metres	—N/a						30:26.67	12
Shivnath Singh	Men's marathon	—N/a						DNF	

=== Field ===
Athlete	Event	Qualification		Final	
Athlete	Event	Result	Rank	Result	Rank
Suresh Babu	Men's triple jump	DNS		Did not qualify	
Suresh Babu	Men's long jump	Bye		7.94 m (26.0 ft)	3rd place, bronze medalist(s)
Ravi Kumara	Men's long jump	Bye		7.41 m (24.3 ft)	11
Praveen Kumar	Men's discus throw	—N/a		49.42 m (162.1 ft)	10
Bahadur Singh Chauhan	Men's shot put	—N/a		16.57 m (54.4 ft)	7
Jugraj Singh Mann	Men's shot put	—N/a		16.50 m (54.1 ft)	8
Gurdeep Singh	Men's shot put	—N/a		15.74 m (51.6 ft)	9

Legend

- Q – Qualified for the next round
For track events, ranks indicated are within the individual heats only.

== Badminton ==
India won one gold and one bronze medal in badminton at the 1978 Commonwealth Games, with Prakash Padukone winning the men's singles title and Ami Ghia and Kanwal Thakur Singh winning bronze in the women's doubles event.

Athlete	Event	Round of 16	Quarter-final	Semifinal	Final / BM	
Athlete	Event	Opposition Result	Opposition Result	Opposition Result	Opposition Result	Rank
Prakash Padukone	Men's singles	Lian (MAS); W 15–3, 15–6	Purser (NZL); W 15–1, 15–8	Stevens (ENG); W 15–0, 15–7	Talbot (ENG); W 15–9, 15–8	1st place, gold medalist(s)
Syed Modi	Men's singles	Selvaraj (MAS); W 15–7, 15–9	Stevens (ENG); L 5–15, 12–15	Did not advance		
Partho Ganguli	Men's singles	Sufian (MAS); W 15–6, 15–10	Talbot (ENG); L 13–15, 15–13, 10–15	Did not advance		
Uday Pawar	Men's singles	Leong (MAS); L 16–17, 6–15	Did not advance			
Kanwal Thakur Singh	Women's singles	Youngberg (CAN); L 10–11, 5–11	Did not advance			
Prakash Padukone; Uday Pawar	Men's doubles	—N/a	Lian / Teong (MAS); L 16–17, 15–12, 8–15	Did not advance		
Ami Ghia; Kanwal Thakur Singh	Women's doubles	—N/a	Ng / Teh (MAS); W 15–6, 13–18, 15–8	Perry / Statt (ENG); L 5–15, 4–15	Sutton / Webster (ENG); W 15–7, 9–15, 15–5	3rd place, bronze medalist(s)

Legend

- W – Win; L – Loss

== Boxing ==
India competed in four boxing events at the 1978 Commonwealth Games. Birender Singh Thapa won the bronze medal in the light-flyweight division.

Athlete	Event	Preliminary	Quarter-final	Semi-final	Final	Rank
Athlete	Event	Opposition Result	Opposition Result	Opposition Result	Opposition Result	Rank
Birender Singh Thapa	Light-flyweight under 48 kg	—N/a	Carson (NIR); W VPO	Muchoki (KEN); L VPO	—N/a	3rd place, bronze medalist(s)
Bakshish Singh	Lightweight 60 kg	Hamill (NIR); L VPO	Did not advance			
Chidanandan Machaiah	Light-welterweight 63.5 kg	Mwangi (KEN); L VPO	Did not advance			
Mani Kumar Rai	Light-middleweight 71 kg	Chama (ZAM); L VPO	Did not advance			

Legend

- W – Win; L – Loss;
- VPO – Victory by points
- KO – Knockout
- WO – Walkover

== Cycling ==
Avtar Dogra Singh represented the country in the men's sprint and time trial events.

Athlete	Event	Qualifying	Quarterfinal	Semifinal	Final	Rank
Athlete	Event	Result	Result	Result	Result	Rank
Avtar Dogra Singh	Time trial (1 km)	—N/a			1:14.39	
Avtar Dogra Singh	1,000 m match sprint		Did not qualify			

== Diving ==
India competed in diving events for the first time, with two athletes participating in the men's events.

Athlete	Event	Result	Rank
Vasant Gadge	Men's 10 metre platform	274.92 points	11
Pun Dambahadur	Men's 3 metre springboard	300.84 points	12

== Gymnastics ==
India competed in artistic gymnastics at the 1978 British Commonwealth Games for the first time, with five athletes participating in the men's individual all-around competition. The Indian team also competed in the men's team competition.

Athlete	Event	Points	Rank
Bishweshwar Nandi	Men's individual all-around	42.85	19
Nemai Kanji	Men's individual all-around	40.05	20
Nandkumar Bhosle	Men's individual all-around	38.65	21
Ahmedur Bablu	Men's individual all-around	31.00	22
Manjit Singh	Men's individual all-around	15.75	23
Bishweshwar Nandi; Nemai Kanji; Nandkumar Bhosle; Ahmedur Bablu; Manjit Singh	Men's team	127.70	6

== Shooting ==
India competed in shooting events for the first time, with five athletes participating in the men's events.

Athlete	Event	Points	Rank
Sharad Chauhan	50 m free pistol	525	11
Sharad Chauhan	25 m rapid-fire pistol	574	6
Raju Wader	25 m rapid-fire pistol	DNF	
Randhir Singh	Clay pigeon trap	174	8
Gurbir Singh Sandhu	Skeet	165	14
Hari Singh Sandhu	Skeet	165	15

== Weightlifting ==
Four athletes competed in the weightlifting events, with Ekambaram Karunakaran winning the gold medal in the men's flyweight division and Muniswamy Tamil Selvan winning the silver medal in the men's bantamweight division.

Athlete	Event	Result	Rank
Ekambaram Karunakaran	Flyweight 52 kg	205 kg	1st place, gold medalist(s)
Anil Paul	Flyweight 52 kg	187.5 kg	4
Muniswamy Tamil Selvan	Bantamweight 56 kg	220 kg	2nd place, silver medalist(s)
Anil Mondal	Bantamweight 56 kg	212.5 kg	4

== Wrestling ==
India won two gold medals, one silver medal and one bronze medal in wrestling at the Games.

Freestyle men

Athlete	Event	Competition rounds				Rank
Athlete	Event	Opposition Result	Opposition Result	Opposition Result	Opposition Result	Rank
Ashok Kumar	Light flyweight 48 kg	Stephens (AUS); W VPO	Dunbar (ENG); W VFA	Gunowski (CAN); W VPO	—N/a	1st place, gold medalist(s)
Sudesh Kumar	Flyweight 52 kg	Hoyt (AUS); W VPO	Takahashi (CAN); L VPO	—N/a		2nd place, silver medalist(s)
Satbir Singh	Bantamweight 57 kg	Oldridge (NZL); W DQ	McKay (SCO); W VFA	Gill (ENG); W VFA	Barry (CAN); W VPO	1st place, gold medalist(s)
Jagminder Singh	Featherweight 62 kg	Beiler (CAN); L VPO	Burke (SCO); W VFA	Katting (NZL); W VPO	Aspen (ENG); W VPO	2nd place, silver medalist(s)
Jagdish Kumar	Lightweight 68 kg	Walker (JAM); W VFA	Kelevitz (AUS); L VPO	Reinsfield (NZL); W VPO	—N/a	4
Rajinder Singh	Welterweight 74 kg	Robinson (NZL); W VPO	McLucas (SCO); W VFA	Zilberman (CAN); W DQ	Haward (ENG); W DQ	1st place, gold medalist(s)
Pannalal Yadav	Middleweight 82 kg	Deschatelets (CAN); L VPO	Koenig (AUS); L VFA	—N/a		5
Kartar Singh	Light heavyweight 90 kg	Danier (CAN); L VPO	Pikos (AUS); L VCB	—N/a		3rd place, bronze medalist(s)
Satpal Singh	Heavyweight 100 kg	Avery (NZL); W VPO	Wishart (CAN); L DQ	—N/a		2nd place, silver medalist(s)
Ishwar Singh	Super heavyweight +100 kg	Gibbons (CAN); L VPO	Patrick (SCO); L VFA	—N/a		3rd place, bronze medalist(s)

Legend

- W – Win; L – Loss;
- VPO – Victory by points
- VFA – Victory by fall
- VCB – Victory by Countback
- DQ – Disqualified
