= India at the 1982 Commonwealth Games =

- CG code: IND
- CGA: Indian Olympic Association
- Website: olympic.ind.in

in Brisbane, Queensland, Australia
- Competitors: 52 in 7 sports
- Medals Ranked 6th: Gold 5 Silver 8 Bronze 3 Total 16

Commonwealth Games appearances (overview)
- 1934; 1938; 1950; 1954; 1958; 1962; 1966; 1970; 1974; 1978; 1982; 1986; 1990; 1994; 1998; 2002; 2006; 2010; 2014; 2018; 2022; 2026; 2030

India competed at the 1982 Commonwealth Games held in Brisbane, Queensland, Australia, from 30 September to 9 October 1982. It was the country's ninth appearance at the Commonwealth Games since making its debut at the 1934 British Empire Games.

The Indian contingent consisted of 52 athletes competing across seven sports. India won a total of sixteen medals, comprising five gold, eight silver and three bronze medals, to finish sixth in the overall medal table.

== Medalists ==
India won sixteen medals, including five gold, eight silver and three bronze medals, to finish sixth in the overall medal table. Wrestling was India's most successful sport, contributing nine medals, while weightlifting added three medals. India also won its first-ever Commonwealth Games medals in shooting, securing one silver and one bronze medal.

| Medal | Name | Sport | Event |
|---|---|---|---|
| (gold) Gold | Syed Modi | Badminton | Men's singles |
| (gold) Gold | Ramchandra Sarang | Wrestling | Light flyweight 48 kg |
| (gold) Gold | Mahabir Singh | Wrestling | Flyweight 52 kg |
| (gold) Gold | Jagminder Singh | Wrestling | Lightweight 68 kg |
| (gold) Gold | Rajinder Singh | Wrestling | Welterweight 74 kg |
| (silver) Silver | Ashok Pandit; Mohinder Lal | Shooting | 25 m centre-fire pistol pairs |
| (silver) Silver | Gurunadan Kombiah | Weightlifting | Flyweight 52 kg |
| (silver) Silver | Bijay Kumar Satpathy | Weightlifting | Bantamweight 56 kg |
| (silver) Silver | Muniswamy Tamil Selvan | Weightlifting | Featherweight 60 kg |
| (silver) Silver | Ashok Kumar | Wrestling | Bantamweight 57 kg |
| (silver) Silver | Kartar Singh | Wrestling | Light Heavyweight 90 kg |
| (silver) Silver | Satpal Singh | Wrestling | Heavyweight 100 kg |
| (silver) Silver | Rajinder Singh | Wrestling | Super Heavyweight +100 kg |
| (bronze) Bronze | Chenanda Machaiah | Boxing | Welterweight 67 kg |
| (bronze) Bronze | Rajinder Kumar Vij; Sharad Chauhan | Shooting | 25m rapid-fire pistol pairs |
| (bronze) Bronze | Jai Prakash Kangar | Wrestling | Middleweight 82 kg |

== Competitors ==
The Indian contingent consisted of 52 athletes competing across seven sports.

| Sport | Men | Women | Total |
|---|---|---|---|
| Athletics | 2 | 1 | 3 |
| Badminton | 4 | 3 | 7 |
| Boxing | 6 | —N/a | 6 |
| Shooting | 8 | —N/a | 8 |
| Swimming | 4 | 4 | 8 |
| Weightlifting | 10 | —N/a | 10 |
| Wrestling | 10 | —N/a | 10 |
| Total | 44 | 8 | 52 |

== Athletics ==
India was represented by four athletes in athletics.

=== Track ===
| Athlete | Event | Time | Rank |
|---|---|---|---|
| Raj Kumar | Men's 5000 metres | 13:46.40 | 10 |
| Siri Chand Ram | Men's 30 km walk | DNF | |

=== Field ===
| Athlete | Event | Qualification | | Final | |
| Athlete | Event | Result | Rank | Result | Rank |
|---|---|---|---|---|---|
| Alapurackal Mathews | Women's long jump | 6.23 m | 4 q | DNS | |

Legend

- q – Qualified for the next round

== Badminton ==
India won one gold medal in badminton at the 1982 Commonwealth Games, with Syed Modi winning the men's singles title.

| Athlete | Event | Round of 16 | Quarterfinal | Semifinal | Final / BM | |
| Athlete | Event | Opposition Result | Opposition Result | Opposition Result | Opposition Result | Rank |
|---|---|---|---|---|---|---|
| Syed Modi | Men's singles | Chan (HKG); W 15–5, 15–1 | Priestman (CAN); W 15–7, 15–9 | Yates (ENG); W 7–15, 15–6, 15–5 | Sidek (MAS); W 15–8, 15–2 | 1st place, gold medalist(s) |
| Pradeep Gandhe | Men's singles | Hamilton (SCO); W 15–4, 4–15, 15–11 | Priestman (CAN); L 15–18, 4–11 | Did not advance | | |
| Vikram Singh | Men's singles | Did not advance | | | | |
| Ami Ghia | Women's singles | Sinton (NZL); W 12–10, 11–8 | Clark (ENG); L 5–11, 11–6, 3–11 | Did not advance | | |
| Amita Kulkarni | Women's singles | Youngberg (CAN); W 0–11, 11–4, 11–5 | Beckman (ENG); L 11–8, 8–11, 2–11 | Did not advance | | |
| Leroy D'Sa; Pradeep Gandhe | Men's doubles | —N/a | Tryon / Johnson (CAN); L 3–15, 13–15 | Did not advance | | |
| Ami Ghia; Kanwal Thakur Singh | Women's doubles | —N/a | Wong / Chan (HKG); W 15–8, 15–2 | Clark / Beckman (ENG); L 17–18, 12–15 | Chapman / Podger (ENG); L 10–15, 15–6, 5–15 | 4 |

Legend

- W – Win; L – Loss

== Boxing ==
India competed in five boxing events at the 1982 Commonwealth Games. Chenanda Machaiah won the bronze medal in the welterweight division.

| Athlete | Event | Preliminary | Quarterfinal | Semifinal | Final | Rank |
| Athlete | Event | Opposition Result | Opposition Result | Opposition Result | Opposition Result | Rank |
|---|---|---|---|---|---|---|
| Birender Singh Thapa | Light-flyweight 48 kg | Bye | Wachire (KEN); L VPO | Did not advance | | |
| Isaac Amaldas | Flyweight 51 kg | —N/a | Musankabala (ZAM); L VPO | Did not advance | | |
| Ganapathy Mandharan | Bantamweight 54 kg | Ouma (KEN); L VPO | Did not advance | | | |
| Mariam Xavier | Featherweight 57 kg | Duff (NIR); W VPO | Kabunda (ZAM); L VPO | Did not advance | | |
| Chenanda Machaiah | Welterweight 67 kg | Amarboye (GHA); W KO 2 | Njunwa (TAN); W VPO | Mukobe (ZAM); L VPO | Did not advance | 3rd place, bronze medalist(s) |
| Kaur Singh | Heavyweight +81 kg | —N/a | Hylton (ENG); L VPO | Did not advance | | |

Legend

- W – Win; L – Loss;
- VPO – Victory by points
- KO – Knockout
- WO – Walkover

== Shooting ==
India competed in 12 shooting events at the 1982 Commonwealth Games. Ashok Pandit and Mohinder Lal won the silver medal in the 25 m centre-fire pistol pairs event, while Rajinder Kumar Vij and Sharad Chauhan won the bronze medal in the 25 m rapid-fire pistol pairs event.

| Athlete | Event | Score | Rank |
|---|---|---|---|
| Sharad Chauhan | 10 m air pistol | 564 | 6 |
| Mohinder Lal | 10 m air pistol | 548 | 17 |
| Sharad Chauhan; Mohinder Lal | 10 m air pistol pairs | 1103 | 8 |
| Bhagirath Samai | 10 m air rifle | 523 | 15 |
| Ramesh Kusale | 10 m air rifle | 527 | 14 |
| Bhagirath Samai; Ramesh Kusale | 10 m air rifle pairs | 1074 | 7 |
| Rajinder Kumar Vij | 25 m rapid-fire pistol | 570 | 14 |
| Sharad Chauhan | 25 m rapid-fire pistol | 575 | 9 |
| Rajinder Kumar Vij; Sharad Chauhan | 25 m rapid-fire pistol pairs | 1151 | 3rd place, bronze medalist(s) |
| Sharad Chauhan | 50 m free pistol | 529 | 13 |
| Bhagirath Samai | 50 m rifle prone | 1151 | 25 |
| Ashok Pandit | 25 m centre-fire pistol | 561 | 10 |
| Mohinder Lal | 25 m centre-fire pistol | 577 | 4 |
| Ashok Pandit; Mohinder Lal | 25 m centre-fire pistol pairs | 1138 | 2nd place, silver medalist(s) |
| Mansher Singh | Clay pigeon trap | 181 | 10 |
| Hari Singh Sandhu | Skeet | 188 | 8 |

== Swimming ==
India competed in eight swimming events at the 1982 Commonwealth Games.

| Athlete | Event | Qualification | Final | Rank |
|---|---|---|---|---|
| Sanjib Chakraborty | Men's 100 m freestyle | 57.25 | Did not advance | |
| Sanjib Chakraborty | Men's 200 m freestyle | 2:07.34 | Did not advance | |
| Anita Sood | Women's 100 m freestyle | 1:03.96 | Did not advance | |
| Anita Sood | Women's 200 m freestyle | 2:17.72 | Did not advance | |
| Wilson Cherian | Men's 100 m backstroke | 1:04.66 | Did not advance | |
| Perses Madan | Women's 100 m backstroke | 1:12.68 | Did not advance | |
| Thouba Singh | Men's 100 m breaststroke | 1:13.51 | Did not advance | |
| Geeta Anand | Women's 100 m breaststroke | 1:24.41 | Did not advance | |
| Wilson Cherian | Men's 200 m backstroke | 2:22.54 | Did not advance | |
| Thouba Singh | Men's 200 m backstroke | 2:46.18 | Did not advance | |
| Geeta Anand | Women's 200 m breaststroke | 2:59.45 | Did not advance | |
| Perses Madan | Women's 200 m breaststroke | 2:36.27 | Did not advance | |
| Khajan Singh | Men's 100 m butterfly | 1:01.65 | Did not advance | |
| Giselle Broacha | Women's 100 m butterfly | 1:21.67 | Did not advance | |
| Perses Madan | Women's 100 m butterfly | 1:10.16 | Did not advance | |
| Khajan Singh | Men's 200 m butterfly | 2:17.30 | Did not advance | |
| Khajan Singh | Men's 200 m individual medley | 2:25.79 | Did not advance | |
| Wilson Cherian | Men's 200 m individual medley | 2:26.51 | Did not advance | |
| Perses Madan | Women's 200 m individual medley | 2:36.67 | Did not advance | |
| Khajan Singh | Men's 400 m individual medley | 5:18.67 | Did not advance | |
| Khajan Singh; Sanjib Chakraborty; Thouba Singh; Wilson Cherian | —N/a | Men's 4 × 100 m freestyle relay | 4:08.12 | 8 |
| Khajan Singh; Sanjib Chakraborty; Thouba Singh; Wilson Cherian | —N/a | Men's 4 × 200 m freestyle relay | 4:08.12 | 7 |
| Khajan Singh; Sanjib Chakraborty; Thouba Singh; Wilson Cherian | —N/a | Men's 4 × 100 m medley relay | 4:18.67 | 7 |
| Anita Sood; Geeta Anand; Giselle Broacha; Perses Madan | —N/a | Women's 4 × 100 m freestyle relay | 4:41.70 | 5 |
| Anita Sood; Geeta Anand; Giselle Broacha; Perses Madan | —N/a | Women's 4 × 100 m medley relay | 4:59.73 | 6 |

== Weightlifting ==
India competed in ten men's weightlifting events at the 1982 Commonwealth Games. Grunadan Kombiah, Bijay Kumar Satpathy and Muniswamy Tamil Selvan won silver medals in the flyweight, bantamweight and featherweight divisions respectively.

| Athlete | Event | Result | Rank |
|---|---|---|---|
| Ekambaram Karunakaran | Flyweight 52 kg | NM | — |
| Grunadan Kombiah | Flyweight 52 kg | 200 kg | 2nd place, silver medalist(s) |
| Bijay Kumar Satpathy | Bantamweight 56 kg | 227.5 kg | 2nd place, silver medalist(s) |
| Vinnaikam Sekar | Bantamweight 56 kg | 222.5 kg | 4 |
| Muniswamy Tamil Selvan | Featherweight 60 kg | 245 kg | 2nd place, silver medalist(s) |
| Raja Gopal Shankaran | Featherweight 60 kg | NM | — |
| Jagmohan Sapra | Lightweight 67.5 kg | 262.5 kg | 6 |
| Jazeel Mehta | Middleweight 75 kg | 265 kg | 9 |
| Meharchand Bhaskar | Light Heavyweight 82.5 kg | 280 kg | 8 |
| Naville Daroga | Super Heavyweight +110 kg | 312.5 kg | 4 |

== Wrestling ==
India competed in ten events, and won four gold medals, four silver medals and one bronze medal in wrestling at the 1982 Commonwealth Games.

Freestyle men

| Athlete | Event | Competition rounds | | | Rank |
| Athlete | Event | Opposition Result | Opposition Result | Opposition Result | Rank |
|---|---|---|---|---|---|
| Ram Chander Sarang | Light flyweight 48 kg | Ojo (NGR); W VPO | Reinsfield (NZL); W VFA | —N/a | 1st place, gold medalist(s) |
| Mahabir Singh | Flyweight 52 kg | Proctor (SCO); W VPO | Takahashi (CAN); W VPO | —N/a | 1st place, gold medalist(s) |
| Ashok Kumar | Bantamweight 57 kg | Cumming (AUS); W VFA | Maddock (NZL); W VPO | Aspen (ENG); L VPO | 2nd place, silver medalist(s) |
| Satvir Singh | Featherweight 62 kg | Robinson (CAN); L VFA | Did not advance | | 7 |
| Jagminder Singh | Lightweight 68 kg | Cavanagh (SCO); W VPO | Gilligan (ENG); W VFA | Kelevitz (AUS); W VPO | 1st place, gold medalist(s) |
| Rajinder Singh | Welterweight 74 kg | Walker (ENG); W VPO | Renken (CAN); W VPO | Reinsfield (NZL); W VPO | 1st place, gold medalist(s) |
| Jai Prakash Kangar | Middleweight 82 kg | Agogo (NGR); W VPO | Rinke (CAN); L VPO | Kurpas (ENG); W VFA | 3rd place, bronze medalist(s) |
| Kartar Singh | Light heavyweight 90 kg | Weir (NIR); W VPO | Michail (AUS); W VFA | Davis (CAN); L VPO | 2nd place, silver medalist(s) |
| Satpal Singh | Heavyweight 100 kg | Peache (ENG); W VPO | DesChatelets (CAN); L VPO | —N/a | 2nd place, silver medalist(s) |
| Rajinder Singh | Super heavyweight +100 kg | Patrick (SCO); W VPO | Wishart (CAN); L VFA | —N/a | 2nd place, silver medalist(s) |

Legend

- W – Win; L – Loss;
- VPO – Victory by points
- VFA – Victory by fall
- VCB – Victory by Countback
- DQ – Disqualified
