= Wrestling at the 1978 Commonwealth Games =

- Venue: Main varsity gymnasium
- Location: University of Alberta, Edmonton, Canada
- Dates: 3 to 12 August 1978

Wrestling at the 1978 Commonwealth Games was the 11th appearance of Wrestling at the Commonwealth Games.

The events were held at the University of Alberta's main gymnasium on the modern day Van Vliet Complex. Also known as the varsity gym, it opened on 17 May 1960.

Canada topped the wrestling medal table by virtue of winning six gold medals.

== Medal table ==
* Host nation (Canada)

Medals won by nation with totals, ranked by number of golds—sortable
Rank	Nation	Gold	Silver	Bronze	Total
1	Canada*	6	3	0	9
2	India	3	3	3	9
3	Australia	1	2	1	4
4	England	0	1	4	5
5	Scotland	0	1	0	1
6	New Zealand	0	0	1	1
6	Northern Ireland	0	0	1	1
Totals (7 entries)		10	10	10	30

== Medallists ==
Event	Gold	Silver	Bronze
Light flyweight 48kg	Ashok Kumar; India	George Gunovski; Canada	Mark Dunbar; England
Flyweight 52kg	Ray Takahashi; Canada	Sudesh Kumar; India	Ken Hoyt; Australia
Bantamweight 57kg	Satbir Singh; India	Michael Barry; Canada	Amrik Singh Gill; England
Featherweight 62kg	Egon Beiler; Canada	Jagminder Singh; India	Brian Aspen; England
Lightweight 68kg	Zsigmund Kelevitz; Australia	Joe Gilligan; England	Jagdish Kumar; India
Welterweight 74kg	Rajinder Singh; India	Victor Zilberman; Canada	Keith Haward; England
Middleweight 82kg	Richard Deschatelets; Canada	Wally Koenig; Australia	Ivan Weir; Northern Ireland
Light heavyweight 90kg	Stephen Danier; Canada	Mick Pikos; Australia	Kartar Singh; India
Heavyweight 100kg	Wyatt Wishart; Canada	Satpal Singh; India	Murray Avery; New Zealand
Super heavyweight +100kg	Robert Gibbons; Canada	Albert Patrick; Scotland	Ishwar Singh; India

== Results ==
=== Light flyweight 48kg ===
Winner	Loser	Score
Ashok Kumar (IND)	Christopher Gerard Stephens (AUS)	pts
George Gunowski (CAN)	Mark Dunbar (ENG)	pts
George Gunowski (CAN)	Christopher Gerard Stephens (AUS)	pts
Ashok Kumar (IND)	Mark Dunbar (ENG)	fall
Ashok Kumar (IND)	George Gunowski (CAN)	pts

Final positions: 1. Kumar 2. Gunowski 3. Dunbar 4. Stephens

=== Flyweight 52kg ===
Only three competitors

Winner	Loser	Score
Ray Takahashi (CAN)	Ken Hoyt (AUS)	pts
Ray Takahashi (CAN)	Sudesh Kumar (IND)	pts
Sudesh Kumar (IND)	Ken Hoyt (AUS)	pts

Final positions: 1. Takahashi 2. Kumar 3. Hoyt

=== Bantamweight 57kg ===
Winner	Loser	Score
Amrik Singh Gill (ENG)	Neil McKay (SCO)	pts
Satbir Singh (IND)	Barry Oldridge (NZL)	disq
Michael Barry (CAN)	Dzafer Dzeladini (AUS)	pts
Satbir Singh (IND)	Neil McKay (SCO)	fall
Michael Barry (CAN)	Amrik Singh Gill (ENG)	pts
Barry Oldridge (NZL)	Dzafer Dzeladini (AUS)	pts
Michael Barry (CAN)	Barry Oldridge (NZL)	pts
Satbir Singh (IND)	Amrik Singh Gill (ENG)	fall
Amrik Singh Gill (ENG)	Barry Oldridge (NZL)	fall
Satbir Singh (IND)	Michael Barry (CAN)	pts

Final positions: 1. Satbir 2. Barry 3. Amrik 4. Oldridge 5. Dzeladini, McKay

=== Featherweight 62kg ===
Winner	Loser	Score
Raymond Katting (NZL)	Raymond Barry (AUS)	disq
Brian Aspen (ENG)	Thomas Burke (SCO)	fall
Egon Beiler (CAN)	Jagminder Singh (IND)	pts
Brian Aspen (ENG)	Raymond Katting (NZL)	disq
Jagminder Singh (IND)	Thomas Burke (SCO)	fall
Egon Beiler (CAN)	Raymond Katting (NZL)	pts
Egon Beiler (CAN)	Brian Aspen (ENG)	fall
Jagminder Singh (IND)	Raymond Katting (NZL)	pts
Jagminder Singh (IND)	Brian Aspen (ENG)	pts

Final positions: 1. Beiler 2. Jagminder 3. Aspen 4. Katting 5. Barry, Burke

=== Lightweight 68kg ===
Winner	Loser	Score
Jagdish Kumar (IND)	Fitzloyd Walker (JAM)	fall
Clive Llewellyn (CAN)	Tam Anderson (SCO)	fall
Zsigmund Kelevitz (AUS)	Joey Gilligan (ENG)	pts
Fitzloyd Walker (JAM)	Ken Reinsfield (NZL)	fall
Zsigmund Kelevitz (AUS)	Jagdish Kumar (IND)	pts
Joey Gilligan (ENG)	Clive Llewellyn (CAN)	pts
Jagdish Kumar (IND)	Ken Reinsfield (NZL)	pts
Joey Gilligan (ENG)	Fitzloyd Walker (JAM)	pts
Zsigmund Kelevitz (AUS)	Clive Llewellyn (CAN)	fall

Final positions: 1. Kelevitz 2. Gilligan 3. Jagdish 4. LLewellyn, Walker 6. Reinsfield 7. Anderson

=== Welterweight 74kg ===
Winner	Loser	Score
Rajinder Singh (IND)	Stephen Robinson (NZL)	pts
Victor Zilberman (CAN)	Keith Haward (ENG)	fall
Rajinder Singh (IND)	Robert McLucas (SCO)	fall
Victor Zilberman (CAN)	Stephen Robinson (NZL)	pts
Rajinder Singh (IND)	Victor Zilberman (CAN)	disq
Keith Haward (ENG)	Robert McLucas (SCO)	pts
Rajinder Singh (IND)	Keith Haward (ENG)	disq

Final positions: 1. Rajinder 2. Zilberman 3. Haward 4. McLucas Robinson

=== Middleweight 82kg ===
Winner	Loser	Score
Wally Koenig (AUS)	Robert Hoffman (NZL)	fall
Richard Deschatelets (CAN)	Pannalal Yadav (IND)	pts
Tony Shacklady (ENG)	Ivan Weir (NIR)	pts
Wally Koenig (AUS)	Pannalal Yadav (IND)	fall
Ivan Weir (NIR)	Robert Hoffman (NZL)	disq
Richard Deschatelets (CAN)	Tony Shacklady (ENG)	fall
Richard Deschatelets (CAN)	Ivan Weir (NIR)	fall
Wally Koenig (AUS)	Tony Shacklady (ENG)	pts
Wally Koenig (AUS)	Ivan Weir (NIR)	injury
Richard Deschatelets (CAN)	Wally Koenig (AUS)	pts

Final positions: 1. Deschatelets 2. Koenig 3. Weir 4. Shacklady 5. Yadav Hoffman

=== Light Heavyweight 90kg ===
Winner	Loser	Score
Mick Pikos (AUS)	Scott Murray (SCO)	fall
Stephen Danier (CAN)	Nigel Sargent (NZL)	disq
?	Scott Murray (SCO)	?
?	Nigel Sargent (NZL)	?
Mick Pikos (AUS)	Kartar Singh (IND)	countback
Stephen Danier (CAN)	Kartar Singh (IND)	pts

Final positions: 1. Danier 2. Pikos 3. Kartar 4. Sargent, Murray

=== Heavyweight 100kg ===
Winner	Loser	Score
?	Keith Peache (ENG)	?
?	Walter Denis Armstrong (AUS)	?
Wyatt Wishart (CAN)	Murray Avery (NZL)	pts
Murray Avery (NZL)	Keith Peache (ENG)	disq
?	Walter Denis Armstrong (AUS)	?
Satpal Singh (IND)	Murray Avery (NZL)	pts
Wyatt Wishart (CAN)	Satpal Singh (IND)	disq

Final positions: 1. Wishart 2. Satpal 3. Avery 4. Peache 5. Armstrong

=== Super Heavyweight +100kg ===
Only three competitors

Winner	Loser	Score
Robert Gibbons (CAN)	Ishwar Singh (IND)	?
Robert Gibbons (CAN)	Albert Patrick (SCO)	fall
Albert Patrick (SCO)	Ishwar Singh (IND)	fall 0.33

Final positions: 1. Gibbons 2. Patrick 3. Ishwar

== See also ==
- List of Commonwealth Games medallists in wrestling
