= Wrestling at the 1982 Commonwealth Games =

- Venue: Brisbane City Hall (main auditorium)
- Location: King George Square, Brisbane, Australia
- Dates: 30 September to 9 October 1982

Wrestling at the 1982 Commonwealth Games was the 12th appearance of Wrestling at the Commonwealth Games. The events were held in Brisbane, Australia, from 30 September to 9 October 1982 and featured contests in ten weight classes.

The events took place in the 2,000 seater main auditorium of the Brisbane City Hall on King George Square.

Canada topped the wrestling medal table by virtue of winning five gold medals.

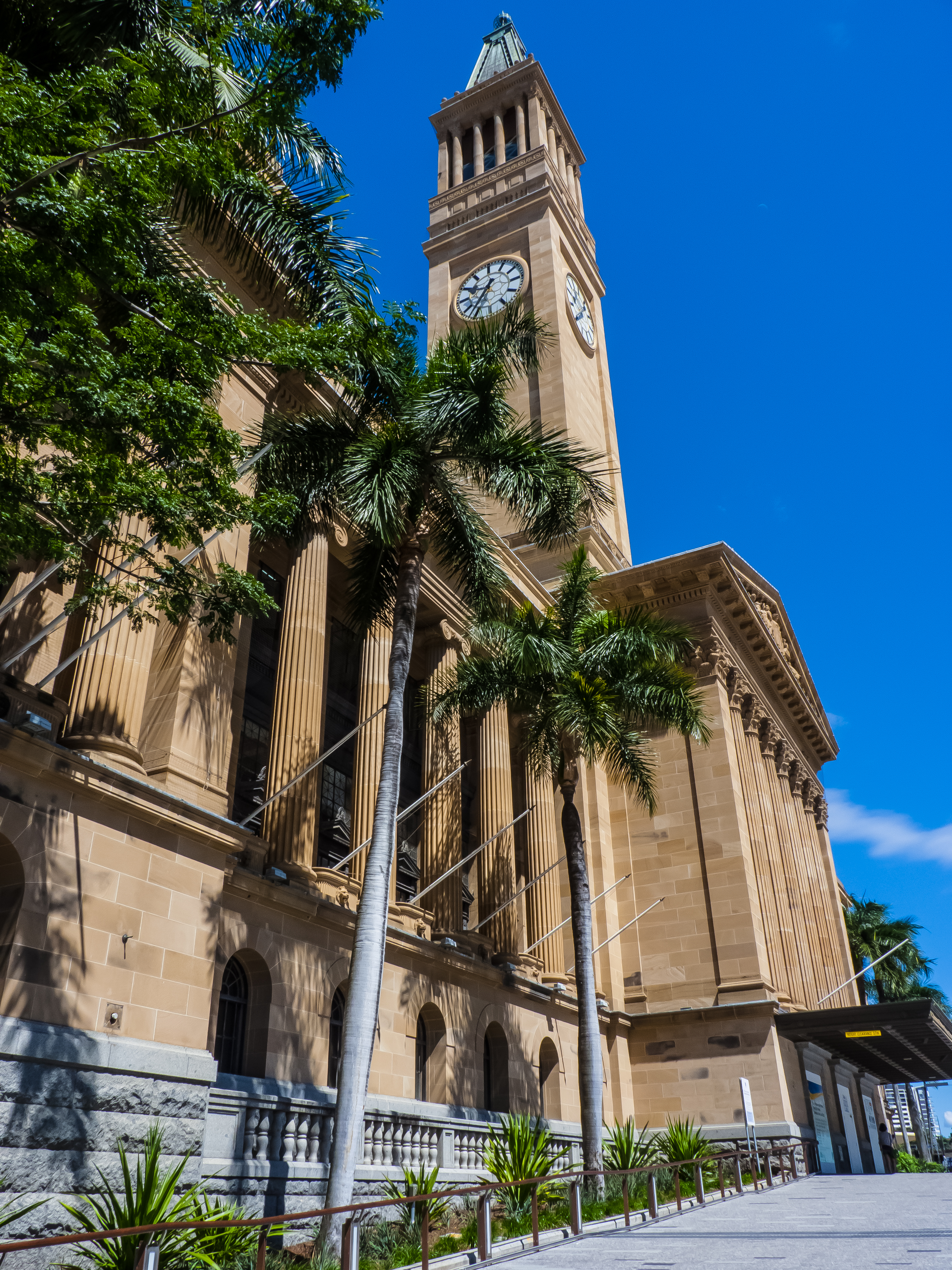
Brisbane City Hall in 2010

== Medal table ==
* Host nation (Australia)

Medals won by nation with totals, ranked by number of golds—sortable
Rank	Nation	Gold	Silver	Bronze	Total
1	Canada	5	1	3	9
2	India	4	4	1	9
3	England	1	0	0	1
4	Australia*	0	3	2	5
5	New Zealand	0	2	2	4
6	Nigeria	0	0	1	1
6	Scotland	0	0	1	1
Totals (7 entries)		10	10	10	30

== Medallists ==
Event	Gold	Silver	Bronze
Light flyweight 48kg	Ram Chander Sarang (IND)	Steve Reinsfield (NZL)	Maldwyn Cooper (CAN)
Flyweight 52kg	Mahabir Singh (IND)	Ray Takahashi (CAN)	Ken Hoyt (AUS)
Bantamweight 57kg	Brian Aspen (ENG)	Ashok Kumar (IND)	Chris Maddock (NZL)
Featherweight 62kg	Bob Robinson (CAN)	Cris Brown (AUS)	Augustine Atasie (NGR)
Lightweight 68kg	Jagmander Singh (IND)	Zsigmund Kelevitz (AUS)	Lloyd Renken (CAN)
Welterweight 74kg	Rajinder Singh (IND)	Ken Reinsfield (NZL)	Brian Renken (CAN)
Middleweight 82kg	Chris Rinke (CAN)	Wally Koenig (AUS)	Jai Parkash Kangar (IND)
Light heavyweight 90kg	Clark Davis (CAN)	Kartar Singh (IND)	Nigel Sargeant (NZL)
Heavyweight 100kg	Richard Deschatelets (CAN)	Satpal Singh (IND)	Murray Avery (AUS)
Super heavyweight +100kg	Wyatt Wishart (CAN)	Rajinder Singh (IND)	Albert Patrick (SCO)

== Results ==
=== Light flyweight 48kg ===
Winner	Loser	Score
Steve Reinsfield (NZL)	Darren Steain (AUS)	4–0
Ram Chander Sarang (IND)	Amos Ojo (NGR)	3.5–0.5
Steve Reinsfield (NZL)	Maldwyn Cooper (CAN)	3.5–0.5
Maldwyn Cooper (CAN)	Amos Ojo (NGR)	3-1
Maldwyn Cooper (CAN)	Darren Steain (AUS)	w/o
Ram Chander Sarang (IND)	Steve Reinsfield (NZL)	fall 4-0

Final positions: 1. Chander Sarang 2. Reinsfield 3. Cooper 4. Ojo, Steain

=== Flyweight 52kg ===
Winner	Loser	Note
Mahabir Singh (IND)	Andrew Proctor (SCO)	4–0
Ray Takahashi (CAN)	Ken Hoyt (AUS)	4–0
Graeme Hawkins (NZL)	Andrew Proctor (SCO)	4–0
Ken Hoyt (AUS)	Graeme Hawkins (NZL)	disq
Mahabir Singh (IND)	Ray Takahashi (CAN)	3–1

Final positions: 1. Singh 2. Takahashi 3. Hoyt 4. Hawkins 5. Proctor

=== Bantamweight 57kg ===
Winner	Loser	Score
Anthony Ubakha (NGR)	Donald Richardson (SCO)	3-1
Brian Aspen (ENG)	Lawrence Holmes (CAN)	4–0
Ashok Kumar (IND)	Daniel Cumming (AUS)	fall
Brian Aspen (ENG)	Anthony Ubakha (NGR)	4–0
Ashok Kumar (IND)	Chris Maddock (NZL)	3.5–0.5
Chris Maddock (NZL)	Daniel Cumming (AUS)	fall 4–0
Brian Aspen (ENG)	Donald Richardson (SCO)	4–0 fall
Chris Maddock (NZL)	Anthony Ubakha (NGR)	3-1
Brian Aspen (ENG)	Ashok Kumar (IND)	3–1

Final positions: 1. Aspen 2. Kumar 3. Maddock 4. Ubakha 5. Richardson 6. Cumming 7. Holmes

=== Featherweight 62kg ===
Winner	Loser	Score
Tony Goodrick (NZL)	Mark Dunbar (ENG)	3–1
Bob Robinson (CAN)	Satvir Singh (IND)	fall
Augustine Atasie (NGR)	Neil McKay (SCO)	4–0
Bob Robinson (CAN)	Neil McKay (SCO)	4–0
Cris Brown (AUS)	Tony Goodrick (NZL)	3–1
Bob Robinson (CAN)	Augustine Atasie (NGR)]	3–0
Cris Brown (AUS)	Mark Dunbar (ENG)	3-1
Augustine Atasie (NGR)	Tony Goodrick (NZL)	3–1
Bob Robinson (CAN)	Cris Brown (AUS)	3–1

Final positions: 1. Robinson 2. Brown 3. Atasie 4. Goodrick 5. Dunbar 6. McKay 7. Satvir

=== Lightweight 68kg ===
Winner	Loser	Score
Renato Saliba (MLT)	Gabriel Mwita (KEN)	4–0
Jagmander Singh (IND)	Michael Cavanagah (SCO)	4–0
Zsigmond Kelevitz (AUS)	Lloyd Renken (CAN)	3–0
Lloyd Renken (CAN)	Renato Saliba (MLT)	4–0
Joey Gilligan (ENG)	Michael Cavanagah (SCO)	4–0
Zsigmond Kelevitz (AUS)	Renato Saliba (MLT)	4–0
Jagmander Singh (IND)	Joey Gilligan (ENG)	4–0 fall
Lloyd Renken (CAN)	Joey Gilligan (ENG)	3–1
Jagmander Singh (IND)	Zsigmond Kelevitz (AUS)	3–0

Final positions: 1. Jagmander 2. Kelevitz 3. Renken 4. Gilligan 5, Saliba 6 Canavagh 7. Mwita

=== Welterweight 74kg ===
Winner	Loser	Score
Ken Reinsfield (NZL)	John Halpin (SCO)	4–0
Craig Green (AUS)	James Kihara (KEN)	4–0
Rajinder Singh (IND)	Fitzloyd Walker (ENG)	3–0
Brian Renken (CAN)	Alex Zammit (MLT)	4–0
Ken Reinsfield (NZL)	Craig Green (AUS)	3–1
Rajinder Singh (IND)	Brian Renken (CAN)	3–1
John Halpin (SCO)	James Kihara (KEN)	4–0
Rajinder Singh (IND)	Alex Zammit (MLT)	4–0
Brian Renken (CAN)	Fitzloyd Walker (ENG)	3–1
Craig Green (AUS)	John Halpin (SCO)	4–0
Brian Renken (CAN)	Craig Green (AUS)	4–0 fall
Rajinder Singh (IND)	Ken Reinsfield (NZL)	3–1

Final positions: 1. Rajinder 2. Reinsfield 3. Renken 4. Green 5. Halpin 6. Walker 7. Kihara, Zammit

=== Middleweight 82kg ===
Winner	Loser	Score
Jai Parkash Kangar (IND)	Kally Agogo (NGR)	3.5–0.0
Chris Rinke (CAN)	Jai Parkash Kangar (IND)	3.5–0.5
Wally Koening (AUS)	Stefan Kurpas (ENG)	4–0
Chris Rinke (CAN)	Kally Agogo (NGR)	3.5–0.0
Jai Parkash Kangar (IND)	Stefan Kurpas (ENG)	4–0 fall
Chris Rinke (CAN)	Wally Koening (AUS)	3–1

Final positions: 1. Rinke 2. Koenig 3. Kangar 4. Kurpas 5. Agogo

=== Light heavyweight 90kg ===
Winner	Loser	Score
Ivan Weir (NIR)	Ilias Lee Michail (AUS)	3–1
Clark Davis (CAN)	Mubinu Balogun (NGR)	4–0
Kartar Singh (IND)	Ivan Weir (NIR)	4–0
Nigel Sargent (NZL)	Mubinu Balogun (NGR)	4–0
Kartar Singh (IND)	Ilias Lee Michail (AUS)	4–0 fall
Clark Davis (CAN)	Nigel Sargent (NZL)	3.5–0.5
Nigel Sargent (NZL)	Ivan Weir (NIR)	injury w/o
Clark Davis (CAN)	Kartar Singh (IND)	3–1

Final positions: 1. Davis 2. Kartar 3. Sargent 4. Weir 5. Michail 6. Balogun

=== Heavyweight 100kg ===
Winner	Loser	Score
Richard DesChatelets (CAN)	Murray Avery (AUS)	3–1
Satpal Singh (IND)	Keith Peache (ENG)	4–0
Murray Avery (AUS)	Keith Peache (ENG)	4–0 fall
Richard DesChatelets (CAN)	Satpal Singh (IND)	3.5–0.5

=== Super heavyweight +100kg ===
Winner	Loser	Score
Wyatt Wishart (CAN)	Arthur David Staples (AUS)	fall 0.18sec
Rajinder Singh (IND)	Albert Patrick (SCO)	4–0
Albert Patrick (SCO)	Arthur David Staples (AUS)	fall 0.57sec
Wyatt Wishart (CAN)	Rajinder Singh (IND)	fall 4–0

Final positions: 1. Wishart 2. Rajinder Singh 3. Patrick 4. Staples

== See also ==
- List of Commonwealth Games medallists in wrestling
