= Wrestling in India =

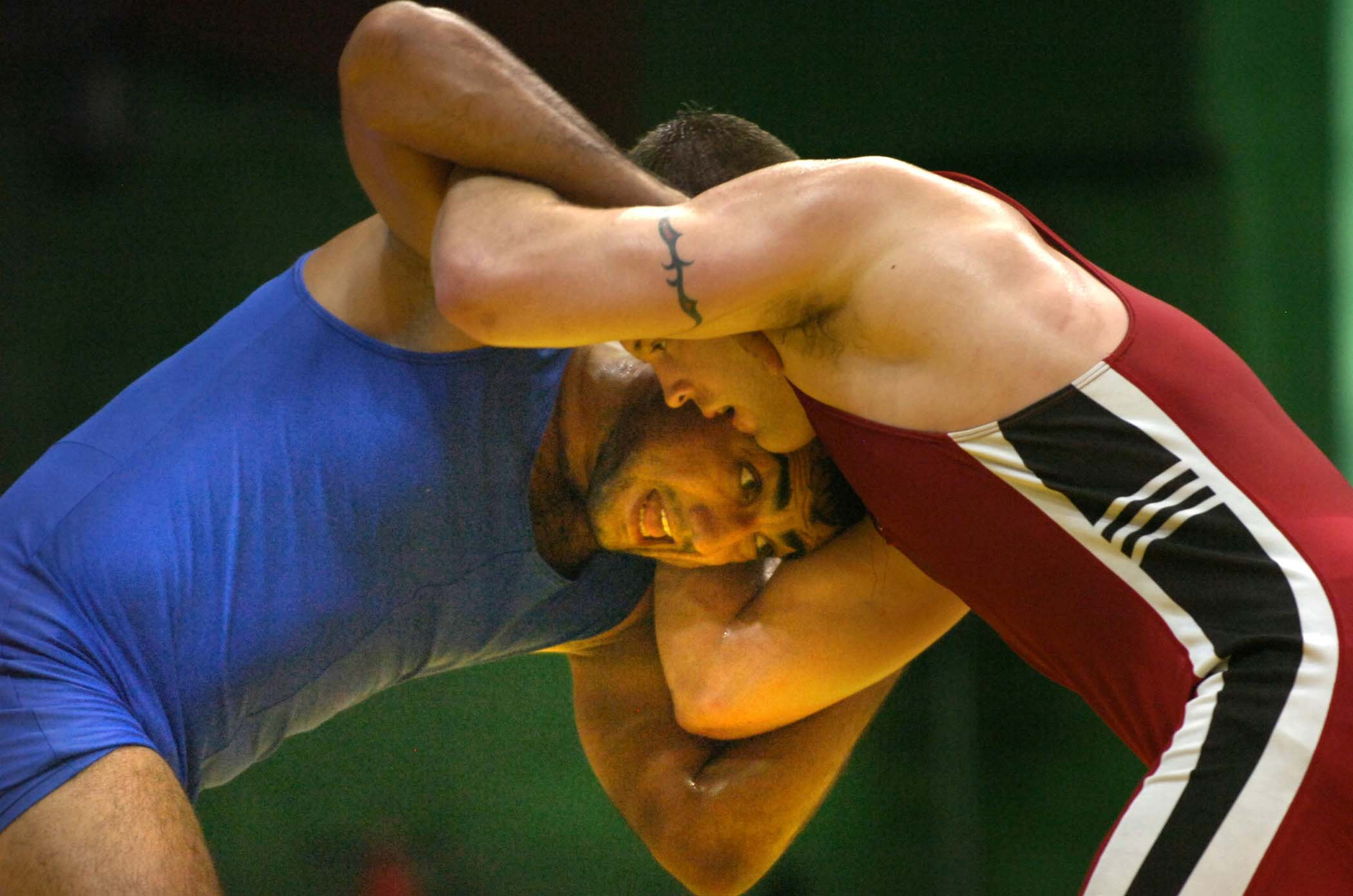
- United States's Kevin Ahearn and Azerbaijan's Eldar Atakishiyev at the 2007 Military World Games held in Hyderabad, India
- Governing body: Wrestling Federation of India

National competitions
- Pro Wrestling League; Hind Kesari

International competitions
- Olympic Medalists: Bronze: K. D. Jadhav in 1952; Bronze: Sushil Kumar in 2008; Silver: Sushil Kumar in 2012; Bronze: Yogeshwar Dutt in 2012; Bronze: Sakshi Malik in 2016; Bronze: Bajrang Punia in 2020; Silver: Ravi Kumar Dahiya in 2020; Bronze: Aman Sehrawat in 2024; Asian Games Champions : Gold: Yogeshwar Dutt, Bajrang Punia, Rajinder Singh, Maruti Mane, Kartar Singh (2 titles), Chandgi Ram, Satpal Singh, Malwa Singh, Ganpat Andhalkar, Vinesh Phogat

Wrestling is one of the oldest sports in India. Several regional styles and variations in folk wrestling exists in the country. Indian wrestlers have won numerous medals at international competitions in freestyle wrestling.

== History ==
Wrestling has been popular in India since ancient times, it was mainly an exercise to stay physically fit. The wrestlers, traditionally, use to wear a loincloth, langota. In Ancient India, wrestling was most famously known as Malla-yuddha. One of the protagonists of the Mahabharata, Bhima, was considered to be a great wrestler of his time, with some of his contemporaries including Karna, Jarasandha, Kichaka, and Balarama. The other prominent Indian epic, the Ramayana, also mentions wrestling in India and Hanuman is described as one of the greatest wrestlers of his time. During the reign of Mughal Empire, who were of Turko-Mongol descent, the influence of Iranian and Mongolian wrestling were incorporated to the local Malla-yuddha to form the modern Pehlwani, wrestling style popular throughout India, Pakistan and Bangladesh in modern times.

Wrestling in India is also known as Dangal, and it is the basic form of a wrestling tournament. It is also called kushti in Punjab and Haryana. The wrestling in Punjab and Haryana will take place in a circular court with soft ground which in Punjabi is called an "akharha". Two wrestlers will continue to wrestle until the back of one touches the ground. The winner will parade the court with the loser following him.[10] The wrestlers are called Pehlwans who train with modern weights and traditional weights such as a Gada (mace). The aim of kushti is to wrestle the opponent and to block the other player.

== Regional variants ==
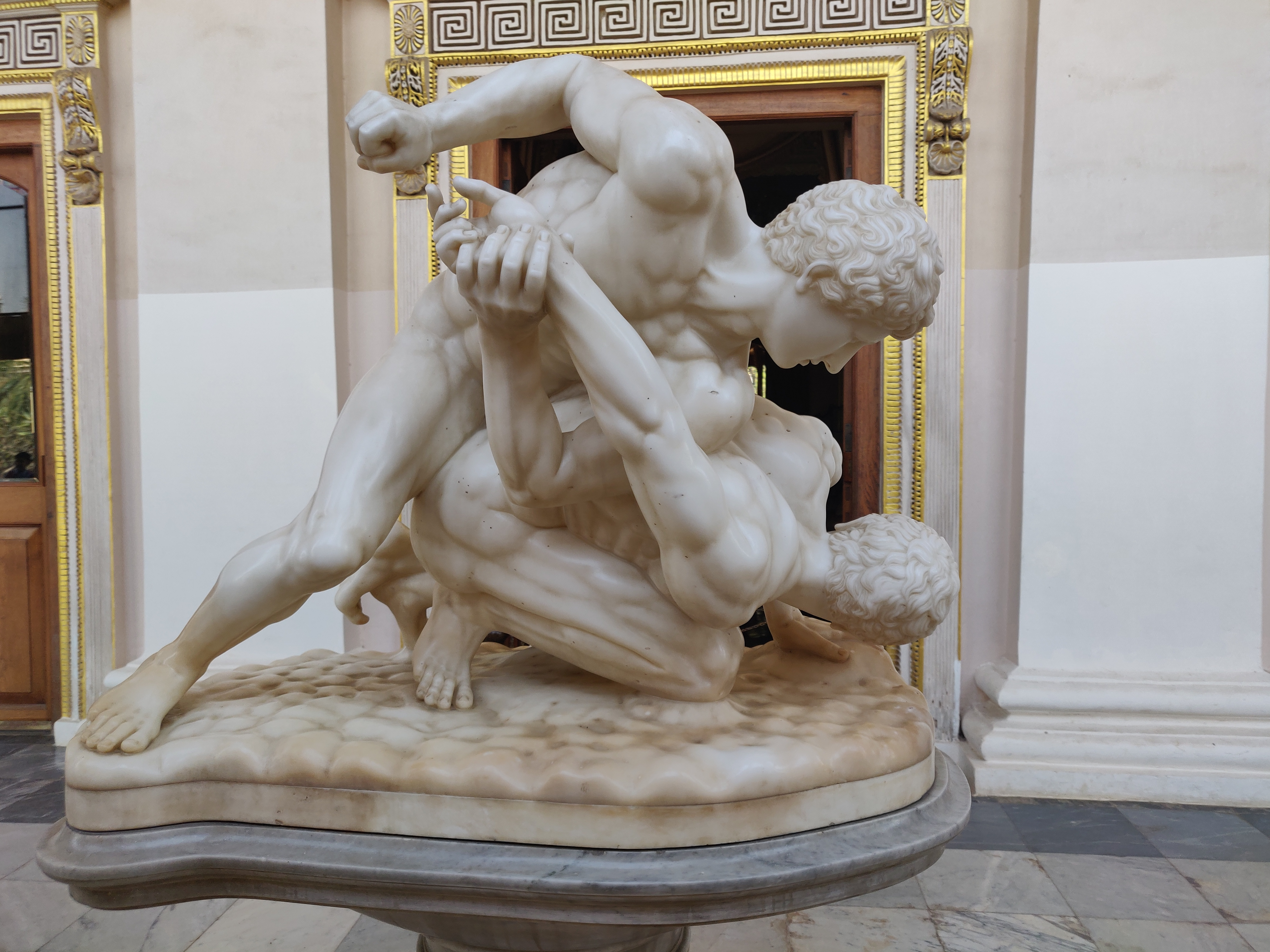
Sculpture of Greek wrestlers at Chowmahalla Palace in Hyderabad.

- Gatta gusthi, a submission wrestling style common in Kerala.
- Inbuan, a traditional folk wrestling style native to Mizoram.
- Kabaddi, a form of South Asian folk wrestling played in teams.
- Kene, a traditional folk wrestling style native to Nagaland.
- Malakhra, a wrestling common in Sindh (Pakistan) and Gujarat.
- Malla-yuddha, oldest traditional wrestling extant in India.
- Malyutham, a folk wrestling style native to Tamil Nadu.
- Mukna, a form of folk wrestling native to Manipur.
- Pehlwani or Kushti, a Mughal style of wrestling common in North India.
- Vajra-mushti, a folk wrestling form which employs a fist-load weapon.

== Tournament records ==
Competition	Gold	Silver	Bronze	Total
Olympic Games	0	2	6	8
World Championship	1	5	16	22
Asian Games	11	15	39	65
Asian Championship	25	82	137	244
Commonwealth Games	49	39	26	114
Total	86	143	224	453

- updated till 31st July, 2024

== Notable performances at Summer Olympics ==
Year	Event	Player	Result
1920
1920	Men's freestyle featherweight	Dinkkarao Shinde	4th
1948
1948	Men's freestyle flyweight	K. D. Jadhav	6th
1952
1952	Men's freestyle bantamweight	K. D. Jadhav	3rd place, bronze medalist(s)
1952	Men's freestyle featherweight	Keshav Mangave	4th
1960
1960	Men's freestyle middleweight	Madho Singh	5th
1960	Men's freestyle light heavyweight	Sajan Singh	7th
1964
1964	Men's freestyle bantamweight	Bishambar Singh	6th
1968
1968	Men's freestyle 52 kg	Sudesh Kumar	6th
1968	Men's freestyle 70 kg	Udey Chand	6th
1972
1972	Men's freestyle 52 kg	Sudesh Kumar	4th
1972	Men's freestyle 57 kg	Prem Nath	4th
1980
1980	Men's freestyle 68 kg	Jagmander Singh	4th
1980	Men's freestyle 48 kg	Mahabir Singh	5th
1980	Men's freestyle 74 kg	Rajinder Singh	6th
1984
1984	Men's freestyle 74 kg	Rajinder Singh	4th
1984	Men's freestyle 57 kg	Rohtas Singh Dahiya	5th
1984	Men's freestyle 52 kg	Mahabir Singh	6th
1984	Men's freestyle 48 kg	Sunil Dutt	7th
1984	Men's freestyle 90 kg	Kartar Singh	7th
1992
1992	Men's freestyle 100 kg	Subhash Verma	6th
1992	Men's Greco-Roman 48 kg	Pappu Yadav	8th
2008
2008	Men's freestyle 66 kg	Sushil Kumar	3rd place, bronze medalist(s)
2012
2012	Men's freestyle 66 kg	Sushil Kumar	2nd place, silver medalist(s)
2012	Men's freestyle 60 kg	Yogeshwar Dutt	3rd place, bronze medalist(s)
2016
2016	Women's freestyle 58 kg	Sakshi Malik	3rd place, bronze medalist(s)
2020
2020	Men's freestyle 57 kg	Ravi Kumar Dahiya	2nd place, silver medalist(s)
2020	Men's freestyle 65 kg	Bajrang Punia	3rd place, bronze medalist(s)
2020	Men's freestyle 86 kg	Deepak Punia	5th
2024
2024	Men's freestyle 57 kg	Aman Sehrawat	3rd place, bronze medalist(s)
2024	Women's freestyle 68 kg	Nisha Dahiya	7th
2024	Women's freestyle 76 kg	Reetika Hooda	7th

== See also ==
- List of National Sports Award recipients in wrestling
- Akhara
- Musti-yuddha, India's oldest form of boxing.
