= Wrestling at the 1984 Summer Olympics – Men's freestyle 57 kg =

Men's freestyle 57 kg at the Games of the XXIII Olympiad
- Venue: Anaheim Convention Center
- Dates: 9–11 August 1984
- Competitors: 16 from 16 nations

Medalists
1st place, gold medalist(s)		Hideaki Tomiyama	Japan
2nd place, silver medalist(s)		Barry Davis	United States
3rd place, bronze medalist(s)		Kim Eui-Kon	South Korea

The Men's Freestyle 57 kg at the 1984 Summer Olympics as part of the wrestling program were held at the Anaheim Convention Center, Anaheim, California.

== Medalists ==
Gold	Hideaki Tomiyama; Japan
Silver	Barry Davis; United States
Bronze	Kim Eui-Kon; South Korea

== Tournament results ==
The wrestlers are divided into 2 groups. The winner of each group decided by a double-elimination system.

Legend

- TF — Won by Fall
- ST — Won by Technical Superiority, 12 points difference
- PP — Won by Points, 1-7 points difference, the loser with points
- PO — Won by Points, 1-7 points difference, the loser without points
- SP — Won by Points, 8-11 points difference, the loser with points
- SO — Won by Points, 8-11 points difference, the loser without points
- P0 — Won by Passivity, scoring zero points
- P1 — Won by Passivity, while leading by 1-7 points
- PS — Won by Passivity, while leading by 8-11 points
- DC — Won by Decision, 0-0 score
- PA — Won by Opponent Injury
- DQ — Won by Forfeit
- DNA — Did not appear
- L — Losses
- ER — Round of Elimination
- CP — Classification Points
- TP — Technical Points

=== Eliminatory round ===
==== Group A ====
L		CP	TP		L
Round 1
1	Marwan Suhail Abood (IRQ)	1-3 PP	2-5	Brian Aspen (GBR)	0
1	İbrahim Akgül (TUR)	0-4 TF	6:00	Hideaki Tomiyama (JPN)	0
0	Orlando Cáceres (PUR)	3.5-.5 SP	14-4	Saúl Leslie (PAN)	1
1	Simon N'Kondag (CMR)	0-4 TF	1:03	Rohtas Singh (IND)	0
Round 2
2	Marwan Suhail Abood (IRQ)	0-4 ST	0-12	İbrahim Akgül (TUR)	1
1	Brian Aspen (GBR)	0-4 TF	3:51	Hideaki Tomiyama (JPN)	0
0	Orlando Cáceres (PUR)	4-0 TF	1:04	Simon N'Kondag (CMR)	2
2	Saúl Leslie (PAN)	0-4 ST	0-12	Rohtas Dahiya Singh (IND)	0
Round 3
1	Brian Aspen (GBR)	3-1 PP	8-5	İbrahim Akgül (TUR)	2
0	Hideaki Tomiyama (JPN)	3.5-.5 SP	11-3	Orlando Cáceres (PUR)	1
0	Rohtas Dahiya Singh (IND)			Bye	
Round 4
1	Rohtas Dahiya Singh (IND)	0-4 TF	2:19	Hideaki Tomiyama (JPN)	0
2	Brian Aspen (GBR)	0-4 PA		Orlando Cáceres (PUR)	1
Final
	Hideaki Tomiyama (JPN)	3.5-.5 SP	11-3	Orlando Cáceres (PUR)	
	Rohtas Dahiya Singh (IND)	0-4 TF	2:19	Hideaki Tomiyama (JPN)	
	Orlando Cáceres (PUR)	3.5-.5 SP	12-4	Rohtas Dahiya Singh (IND)	

Wrestler	L	ER	CP	Final
Hideaki Tomiyama (JPN)	0	-	15.5	7.5
Orlando Cáceres (PUR)	1	-	12	4
Rohtas Dahiya Singh (IND)	1	-	8	0.5
Brian Aspen (GBR)	2	4	6	
İbrahim Akgül (TUR)	2	3	5	
Marwan Suhail Abood (IRQ)	2	2	1	
Saúl Leslie (PAN)	2	2	0.5	
Simon N'Kondag (CMR)	2	2	0	

==== Group B ====
L		CP	TP		L
Round 1
0	Graeme Hawkins (NZL)	4-0 TF	1:35	Miguel Ángel García (ESP)	1
0	Barry Davis (USA)	4-0 ST	24-10	Guan Bunima (CHN)	1
1	Sergio Severino (DOM)	0-4 ST	5-17	Zoran Šorov (YUG)	0
1	Lawrence Holmes (CAN)	0-4 ST	1-13	Kim Eui-Kon (KOR)	0
Round 2
1	Graeme Hawkins (NZL)	0-4 ST	0-12	Barry Davis (USA)	0
2	Miguel Ángel García (ESP)	0-4 ST	0-12	Guan Bunima (CHN)	1
0	Zoran Šorov (YUG)	3-1 PP	8-3	Lawrence Holmes (CAN)	2
0	Kim Eui-Kon (KOR)			Bye	
1	Sergio Severino (DOM)			DNA	
Round 3
1	Kim Eui-Kon (KOR)	.5-3.5 SP	1-9	Barry Davis (USA)	0
2	Graeme Hawkins (NZL)	0-4 ST	3-15	Guan Bunima (CHN)	1
0	Zoran Šorov (YUG)			Bye	
Round 4
1	Zoran Šorov (YUG)	1-3 PP	4-6	Barry Davis (USA)	0
1	Kim Eui-Kon (KOR)	4-0 ST	12-0	Guan Bunima (CHN)	2
Final
	Kim Eui-Kon (KOR)	.5-3.5 SP	1-9	Barry Davis (USA)	
	Zoran Šorov (YUG)	1-3 PP	4-6	Barry Davis (USA)	
	Zoran Šorov (YUG)	.5-3.5 SP	2-10	Kim Eui-Kon (KOR)	

Wrestler	L	ER	CP	Final
Barry Davis (USA)	0	-	14.5	6.5
Kim Eui-Kon (KOR)	1	-	8.5	4
Zoran Šorov (YUG)	1	-	8	1.5
Guan Bunima (CHN)	2	4	8	
Graeme Hawkins (NZL)	2	3	4	
Lawrence Holmes (CAN)	2	2	1	
Miguel Ángel García (ESP)	2	2	0	
Sergio Severino (DOM)	1	1	0	

=== Final round ===
	CP	TP	
5th place match
Rohtas Dahiya Singh (IND)	3-1 PP	3-2	Zoran Šorov (YUG)
Bronze medal match
Orlando Cáceres (PUR)	1-3 PP	4-7	Kim Eui-Kon (KOR)
Gold medal match
Hideaki Tomiyama (JPN)	3-1 PP	8-3	Barry Davis (USA)

== Final standings ==
1. Hideaki Tomiyama (JPN)
2. Barry Davis (USA)
3. Kim Eui-Kon (KOR)
4. Orlando Cáceres (PUR)
5. Rohtas Dahiya Singh (IND)
6. Zoran Šorov (YUG)
7. Guan Bunima (CHN)
8. İbrahim Akgül (TUR)
