= Egattur =

Egattur may refer to the following neighborhoods of Chennai, India:

- Egattur (Tiruvallur District), a village in Tiruvallur District, Chennai Metropolitan Area
- Egattur (Kanchipuram District), a village in Kachipuram District, Chennai Metropolitan Area
