= Wrestling at the 1938 British Empire Games =

- Venue: Rushcutters Bay Stadium
- Location: Sydney, Australia
- Dates: 5 – 12 February 1938

At the 1938 British Empire Games, the wrestling competition was held in Sydney, Australia, and featured contests in seven weight classes.

The wrestling events were held at the Rushcutters Bay Stadium, following a large number of entries for the boxing and wrestling events.

Wrestlers in each weight division would compete in a round-robin to determine final positions.

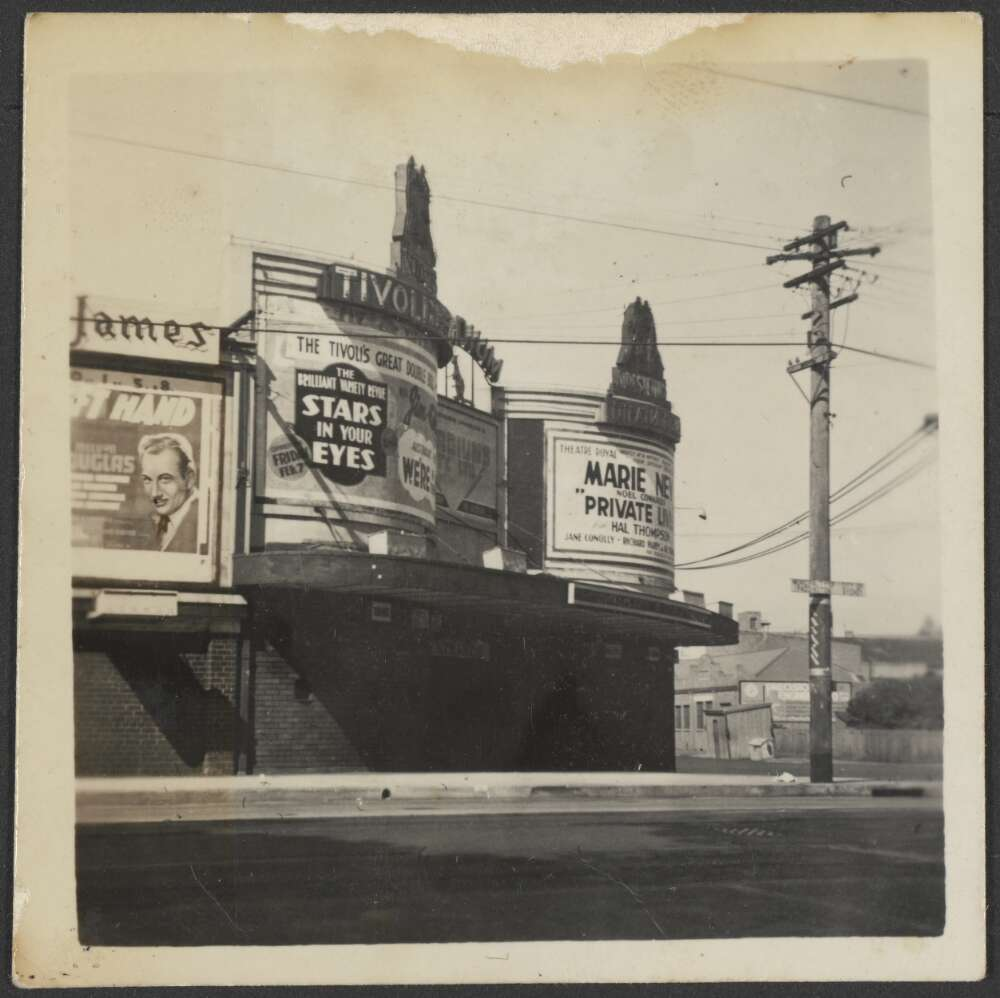
The Sydney Stadium (also called Rushcutters Bay Stadium) in 1941J

== Medal table ==
* Host nation (Australia)

Medals won by nation with totals, ranked by number of golds—sortable
Rank	Nation	Gold	Silver	Bronze	Total
1	Australia (AUS)*	6	0	0	6
2	Canada (CAN)	1	2	1	4
3	South Africa (SAF)	0	3	1	4
4	New Zealand (NZL)	0	2	2	4
5	England (ENG)	0	0	2	2
6	Scotland (SCO)	0	0	1	1
Totals (6 entries)		7	7	7	21

=== Medallists ===
All events were for men only.

Event	Gold	Silver	Bronze
Bantamweight	Ted Purcell (AUS)	Vernon Blake (CAN)	Ray Cazaux (ENG)
Featherweight	Roy Purchase (AUS)	Larry Clarke (CAN)	Joe Genet (NZL)
Lightweight	Dick Garrard (AUS)	Vernon Thomas (NZL)	Alfred Harding (SAF)
Welterweight	Tom Trevaskis (AUS)	Felix Stander (SAF)	Jerry Podjursky (NZL)
Middleweight	Terry Evans (CAN)	Peter Sheasby (SAF)	Leslie Jeffers (ENG)
Light heavyweight	Eddie Scarf (AUS)	Sidney Greenspan (SAF)	Thomas Ward (SCO)
Heavyweight	Jack Knight (AUS)	Jim Dryden (NZL)	John Whelan (CAN)

=== Round robin ===
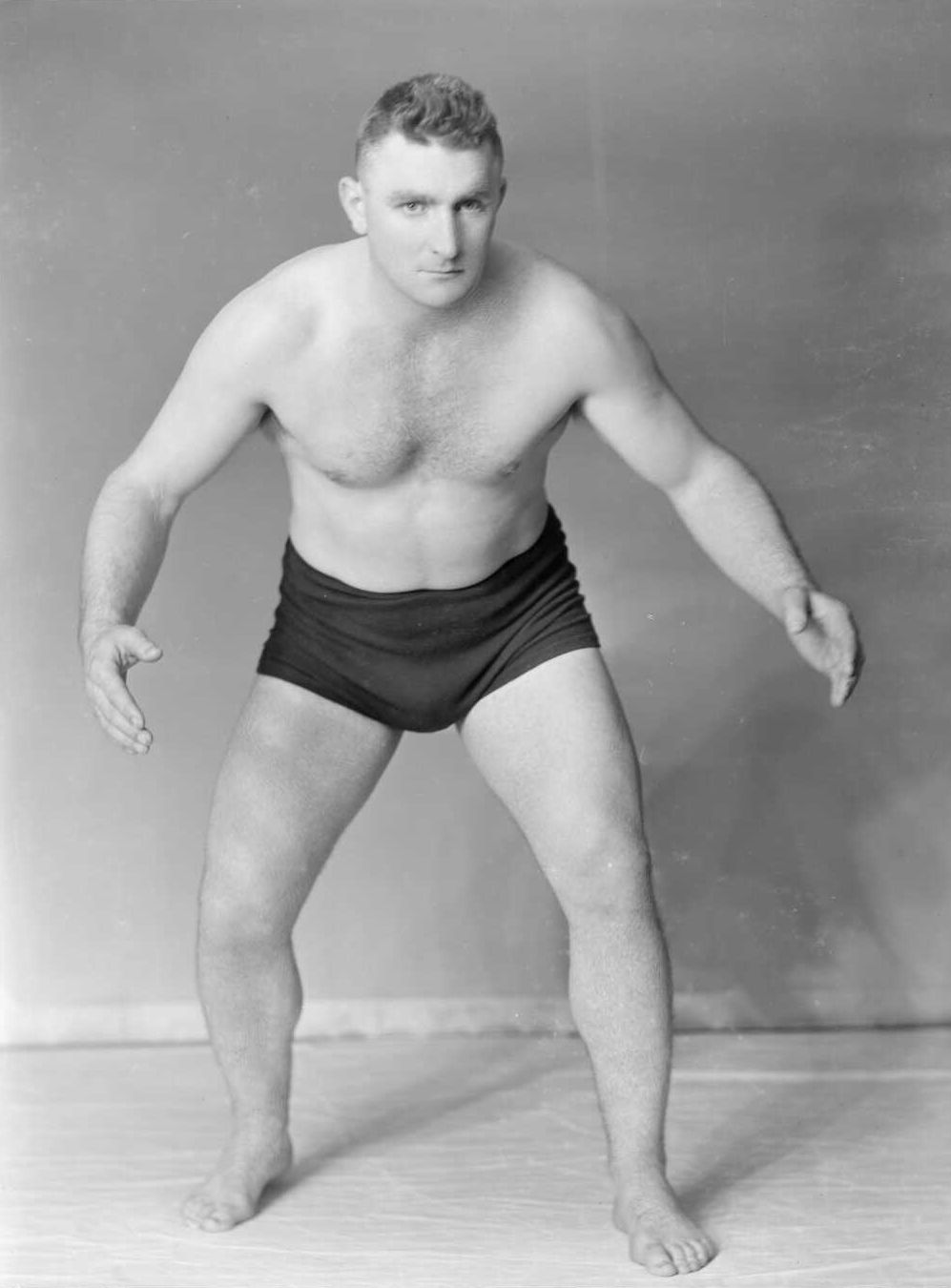
Jim Dryden of New Zealand won a silver medal at heavyweight

Weight	Winner	Loser	Score
Bantamweight
	Vernon Blake (CAN)	Ray Cazaux (ENG)	Points
	Leo Nolan (NZL)	Ted Purcell (AUS)	3mins
	Cazaux	Nolan	1min 45sec
	Purcell	Blake	9mins
	Blake	Nolan	9mins
	Purcell	Cazaux	Points
Featherweight
	Roy Purchase (AUS)	Larry Clarke (CAN)	5mins
	Purchase	Joe Genet (NZL)	1min
	Clarke	Genet	Points
Lightweight
	Dick Garrard (AUS)	Alfred Harding (SAF)	Points
	Garrard	Vernon Thomas (NZL)	Points
	Thomas	Harding	Points
Welterweight
	Tom Trevaskis (AUS)	Jerry Podjursky (NZL)	8.5mins
	Felix Stander (SAF)	Podjursky	7.5mins
	Trevaskis	Stander	Points
Middleweight
	Peter Sheasby (SAF)	Leslie Jeffers (ENG)	Points
	Terry Evans (CAN)	Todd A. Hardwick (AUS)	Points
	Jeffers	Harcourt Godfrey (NZL)	2mins
	Sheasby	Hardwick	6mins
	Evans	Jeffers	Points
	Sheasby	Godfrey	14mins 28sec
	Evans	Sheasby	Points
	Evans	Godfrey	?
	Godfrey	Hardwick	?
	Jeffers	Hardwick	?
Light heavyweight
	Sidney Greenspan (SAF)	Torsten Anderson (NZL)	2.5mins
	Eddie Scarf (AUS)	Thomas Ward (SCO)	Points
	Greenspan	Ward	Points
	Scarf	Anderson	5.5mins
	Scarf	Greenspan	2mins 57sec
	Ward	Anderson	?
Heavyweight
	Jack Knight (AUS)	John Whelan (CAN)	1min
	Jim Dryden (NZL)	Archie Dudgeon (SCO)	Points
	Dryden	Whelan	Points
	Knight	Dudgeon	2.5mins
	Knight	Dryden	14min 58sec
	Whelan	Dudgeon	?
