= Simon N'Kondag =

Cameroonian wrestler

Personal information
- Nationality: Cameroonian
- Born: 3 January 1964 (age 62)

Sport
- Sport: Wrestling

Simon N'Kondag (born 3 January 1964) is a Cameroonian wrestler. He competed in the men's freestyle 57 kg at the 1984 Summer Olympics.
