= Kim Eui-kon =

South Korean wrestler (1958–2014)

Personal information
- Born: 16 November 1957
- Died: 15 February 2014 (aged 56)

Korean name
- Hangul: 김의곤
- RR: Gim Uigon
- MR: Kim Ŭigon
Medal record
Men's freestyle wrestling
Representing South Korea
Olympic Games
Bronze medal – third place	1984 Los Angeles	57 kg
Asian Games
Bronze medal – third place	1978 Bangkok	57 kg

Kim Eui-kon (Korean: 김의곤; 24 January 1958 – 15 February 2014) was a Korean wrestler who competed in the 1984 Summer Olympics.
