= İbrahim Akgül =

Turkish wrestler

Personal information
- Nationality: Turkish
- Born: 15 February 1962 (age 64)

Sport
- Sport: Wrestling

İbrahim Akgül (born 15 February 1962) is a Turkish wrestler. He competed in the men's freestyle 57 kg at the 1984 Summer Olympics.
