= Guan Bunima =

Chinese wrestler

Personal information
- Nationality: Chinese
- Born: 2 October 1958 (age 67)

Sport
- Sport: Wrestling

Guan Bunima (Chinese: 官布尼玛; pinyin: Guān Bù-ní-mǎ; born 2 October 1958) also called Guan Bun, is a Chinese wrestler. He competed in the men's freestyle 57 kg at the 1984 Summer Olympics.
