= Miguel Ángel García (wrestler) =

Spanish wrestler

Miguel Ángel García (born 28 September 1960) is a Spanish wrestler. He represented Spain at the Wrestling at the 1984 Summer Olympics – Men's freestyle 57 kg.
