= Saúl Leslie =

Panamanian wrestler

Personal information
- Nationality: Panamanian
- Born: 3 March 1964 (age 62)

Sport
- Sport: Wrestling

Saúl Leslie (born 3 March 1964) is a Panamanian wrestler. He competed in the men's freestyle 57 kg at the 1984 Summer Olympics.
