= Ekambaram Karunakaran =

Indian weightlifter

E. Karunakaran
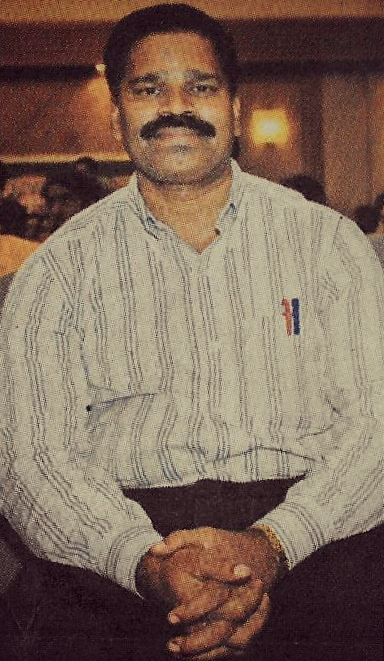
- Karunakaran at Hindustan Sports Foundation

Personal information
- Full name: Ekambaram Karunakaran
- Nickname: Iron Man
- Nationality: Indian
- Born: 6 June 1954 (age 72) Egattur, Tamil Nadu, India
- Education: NIS Patiala, Punjab
- Height: 1.68 m (5 ft 6 in) (2015)
- Weight: 77 kg (170 lb) (2015)

Sport
- Country: India
- Sport: Weightlifting
- Event: 52 kg
- Partner: Kalavathy
- Retired: 2015
- Now coaching: National Institute of Sports

Achievements and titles
- Highest world ranking: Rank 1(1978)
Medal record
Men's weightlifting
Representing India
Men's Weight Lifting
Commonwealth Games
Gold medal – first place	1978 Edmonton	Flyweight
Commonwealth Weightlifting Championships
Gold medal – first place	1980 Cardiff	Flyweight
Gold medal – first place	1981 Auckland	Flyweight
Mini Commonwealth Games
Gold medal – first place	1981 Brisbane	Flyweight
New Zealand Summer Games
Bronze medal – third place	1981 Auckland	Flyweight
Asian Weightlifting Championships
Silver medal – second place	1981 Nagoya	Flyweight
World Railway Games
Bronze medal – third place	1984 Sofia	Flyweight
Pakistan National Games
Silver medal – second place	1984 Islambabad	Flyweight

Ekambaram Karunakaran (also Karunagaran, born 6 June 1954) is an Indian former weightlifter. He competed in the men's flyweight event at the 1980 Summer Olympics. He was the first Indian to win the gold medal in an international competition in weightlifting. This was in the Commonwealth Games in Edmonton, Canada in 1978. Karunakaran's career spanned over a decade. He was conferred with the Arjuna Award in the year 1978-79 by the Government of India.

== Early life ==
Karunakaran was born in Egattur, Thiruvallur, Tamil Nadu to Ekambaram and Karupaiammal Karunakaran. He studied at Kadambathur Government higher secondary school and then worked with Southern Railway in Chennai.

== Career ==
Initially interested in Kabaddi, Karunakaran took to weightlifting to gain strength and power at age 17. He was initially very thin. He was an instant success at the national level, winning the 52 kg class from 1978 to 1982. His international career began almost simultaneously. He took the gold medal with an aggregate of 95 kg snatch, and 110 kg clean and jerk lifts, totaling 205 kg in Edmonton’s Northern Alberta Jubilee Auditorium in 1978. His lift of 110 kg in the jerk set a new games record. He won the Inter Railway Championship title seven times consecutively beginning in 1978. Two years later he won another gold at the Commonwealth weightlifting championship and broke 6 international records in Cardiff, Wales. Thereafter he took part in competitions in New Zealand and the Commonwealth Games in Brisbane, Australia; where he carried the Indian Tricolor.

He won silver and bronze medals at the Asian Championships in Nagoya in 1981. This was followed by a Silver Medal in the Pakistan National Games that occurred during the same year. Karunakaran captained the Indian weightlifting squad to the World Railways Meet in Bulgaria in 1984 where he won a bronze medal.

=== Coach ===
Karunakaran holds a diploma in coaching from the National Institute of Sports in Patiala and has coached the Southern Railways, the Indian Railways and finally the national teams. He accompanied the Indian Weightlifting Team as Manager at the SAF Games held at Islamabad in 1989. An Arjuna Award winner in 1978-79, he was feted by the Sports Journalist Association of Tamil Nadu during 1981-82. He worked as a Coach for Asian Games at the Hiroshima Asian Games in Japan during the year 1994. He was honored as the Best Coach in 1995.

In 2009, he represented as a coach in the Youth World Weightlifting Championship held at Chiang Mai, Thailand; and qualified for Junior World Cup (first time in Indian history). In 2010 he worked as a coach in the Asian Youth Olympic Qualification, the 17th Asian Junior Women, and the 24th Asian Junior Men Weightlifting Championships; qualifying for the Junior World Cup. The team won the silver medal. In 2010 he represented as a coach in the Commonwealth Weightlifting Championship held at Penang, Malaysia.

== See also ==
- List of Tamil recipients of the Arjuna Award
