= Marwan Suhail Abood =

Iraqi wrestler and coach (born 1959)

Personal information
- Nationality: Iraqi
- Born: 1959

Sport
- Sport: Wrestling

Marwan Suhail Abood (Arabic: مروان سهيل عبود, born 1959) is an Iraqi wrestler and wrestling coach.

== Wrestling career ==
On July 7, 1983 he won the gold medal at the Arab Championship in the senior freestyle 57.0 kg class.

In August 1984 he competed in the 1984 Summer Olympics in Los Angeles in the men's bantamweight, freestyle event fishing tenth overall.

During the Pan Arabian Games on August 9, 1985 he took the gold medal also in the senior freestyle 57.0 kg class.

In 1987 he returned to the Arab Championship and took home the gold again on November 25.

On new years day 1988 he finished ranked third in the World Military Championship.

On July 13, 1990 he competed in the Baghdad International Tournament as a senior in the freestyle 57.0 kg weight class and was ranked 2.
