= Jerry Podjursky =

New Zealand wrestler

Personal information
- Born: Jeremiah Daniel Podjursky; 30 March 1912 Turakina, New Zealand
- Died: 8 October 1947 (aged 35) Pātea, New Zealand
- Height: 1.63 m (5 ft 4 in)
- Weight: 70 kg (154 lb)
- Spouse: Elsie Muriel Williams (m. 1935)

Sport
- Country: New Zealand
- Sport: Wrestling

Achievements and titles
- National finals: Welterweight champion (1937)
Medal record
Men's wrestling
Representing New Zealand
British Empire Games
Bronze medal – third place	1938 Sydney	Welterweight

Jeremiah Daniel Podjursky (30 March 1912 – 8 October 1947) was a New Zealand wrestler who won a bronze medal representing his country at the 1938 British Empire Games.

== Biography ==
Podjursky was born at Turakina on 30 March 1912, and took up wrestling when he was 18 years old. He was initially trained by his older brother, Manswell George Podjursky, who had won the national lightweight title in 1928. Jerry Podjursky was selected for the 1932 national championships in Auckland, but was unable to fight after weighing in half a pound overweight for his division. In 1936, he won the Wanganui championship and reached the final of the North Island championship, where he and his opponent were both injured in the fourth round. In 1938, after winning both the Wanganui and North Island titles, Podjursky won the welterweight division at the national championships in Wellington. With this achievement, the Podjursky brothers became the first siblings to win national wrestling titles in New Zealand.

At the 1938 British Empire Games in Sydney, Podjursky won the bronze medal in the welterweight category.

Podjursky married Elsie Muriel Williams at Christ Church, Whanganui, on 29 May 1935. He died at Pātea on 8 October 1947, and was buried in Aramoho Cemetery, Whanganui.
