= Anil Kumar (wrestler, born 1979) =

Indian sport wrestler

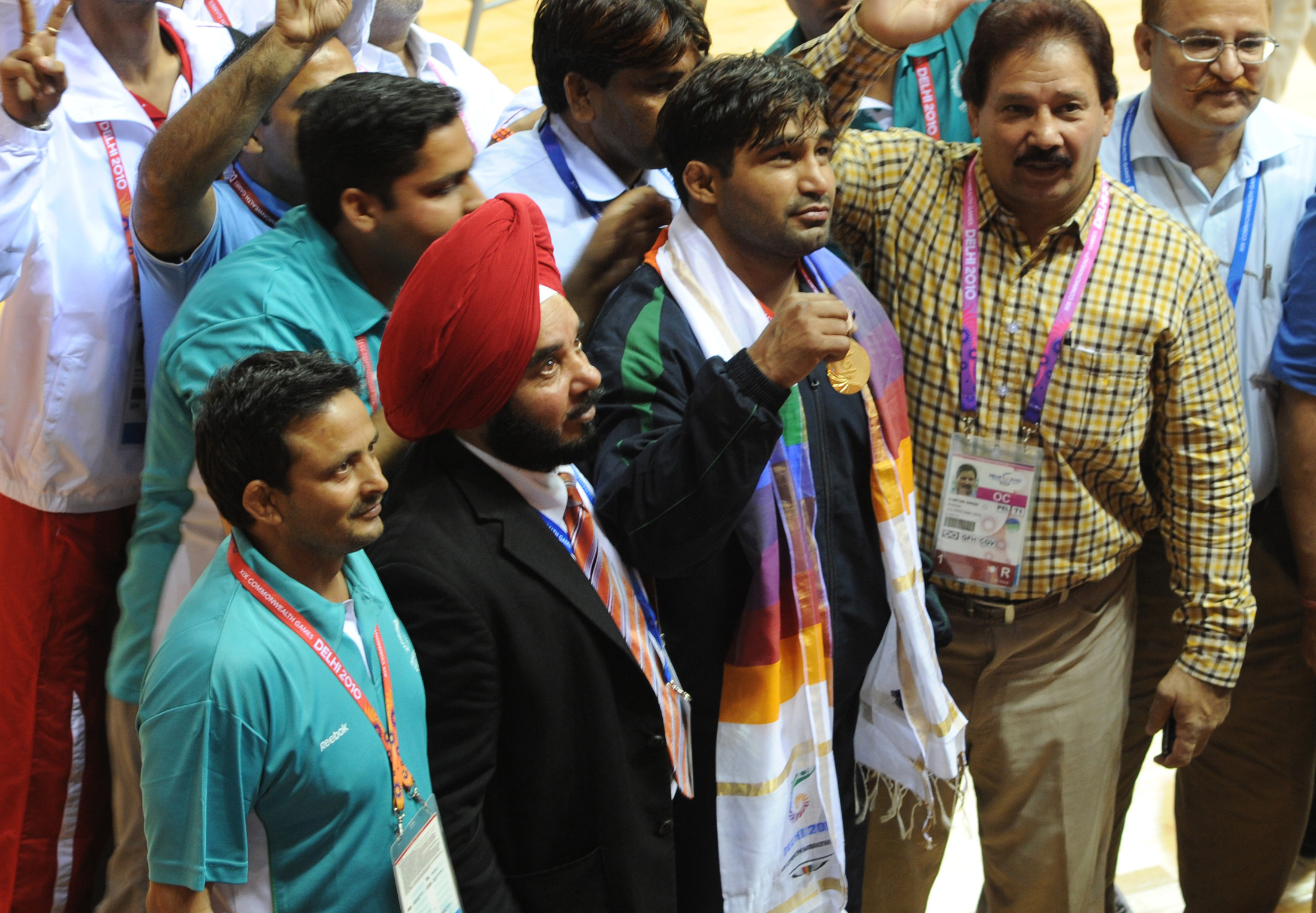
Kumar with gold medal during 2010 Commonwealth Games

Anil Kumar (born 1 March 1979) is an Indian wrestler who hails from Haryana. At the 2010 Commonwealth Games, he won a gold in the Men's Greco-Roman 96 kg's wrestling.
