= Zoran Šorov =

Yugoslav wrestler (born 1961)

Personal information
- Nationality: Macedonian
- Born: 17 November 1961 (age 63)

Sport
- Sport: Wrestling

Zoran Šorov (born 17 November 1961) is a Macedonian wrestler. He competed at the 1984 Summer Olympics, the 1988 Summer Olympics and the 1992 Summer Olympics.
