= Joe Genet =

New Zealand wrestler

Personal information
- Born: Joseph Francis Genet; 2 June 1914
- Died: 1 September 1999 (aged 85)
- Occupation: Clothes presser
- Weight: 59 kg (131 lb)

Sport
- Country: New Zealand
- Sport: Wrestling
Medal record
Representing New Zealand
Men's wrestling
British Empire Games
Bronze medal – third place	1938 Sydney	Men's featherweight

Joseph Francis Genet (2 June 1914 – 1 September 1999) was a New Zealand wrestler who won a bronze medal representing his country at the 1938 British Empire Games.

== Biography ==
Born on 2 June 1914, Genet was the son of Frances Genet (née Bradshaw) and her husband Alexander Genet.

At the 1938 British Empire Games in Sydney, he won the bronze medal in the men's featherweight (62 kg) division.

During World War II, Genet served with the 2nd New Zealand Expeditionary Force, reaching the rank of corporal. Before and after the war, he worked as a clothing presser.

Genet died on 1 September 1999, and was buried at Temuka Cemetery.
