= Rohtas Singh Dahiya =

Indian wrestler

Rohtas Singh
Personal information
- Full name: Rohtas Dahiya Singh
- Nationality: Indian
- Born: 2 July 1960 (age 66) Sonipat, India

Sport
- Sport: Wrestling

Rohtas Dahiya Singh (born 2 July 1960) is an Indian wrestler. He competed in the men's freestyle 57 kg at the 1984 Summer Olympics. He received Arjun Award in 1998.
