= Graeme Hawkins =

New Zealand wrestler

Personal information
- Full name: Graeme Roy Hawkins
- Nationality: New Zealand
- Born: 20 February 1962 (age 64) Wellington, New Zealand

Sport
- Sport: Wrestling

Graeme Hawkins (born 20 February 1962) is a New Zealand wrestler. He competed at the 1982 Commonwealth Games and the men's freestyle 57 kg at the 1984 Summer Olympics.
