= Vernon Thomas (wrestler) =

New Zealand wrestler

Personal information
- Born: Vernon Lawrence Walter Thomas; 27 August 1914
- Died: 17 November 1957 (aged 43)

Sport
- Country: New Zealand
- Sport: Wrestling

Achievements and titles
- National finals: Welterweight champion (1935, 1936, 1938); Lightweight champion (1937)
Medal record
Representing New Zealand
Men's wrestling
British Empire Games
Silver medal – second place	1938 Sydney	Lightweight

Vernon Lawrence Walter Thomas (27 August 1914 – 17 November 1957) was a New Zealand wrestler who won a silver medal at the 1938 British Empire Games.

== Biography ==
Born on 27 August 1914, Thomas was the son of Rubena Birss and her husband Walter Samuel Thomas.

Thomas won four New Zealand national amateur wrestling titles: the welterweight title in 1935, 1936, and 1938; and the lightweight championship in 1937. At the 1938 British Empire Games in Sydney, he won the silver medal in the men's lightweight division.

Thomas died on 17 November 1957, and his ashes were buried in Karori Cemetery, Wellington.
