= Clive Llewellyn =

Canadian wrestler and lawyer (born 1953)

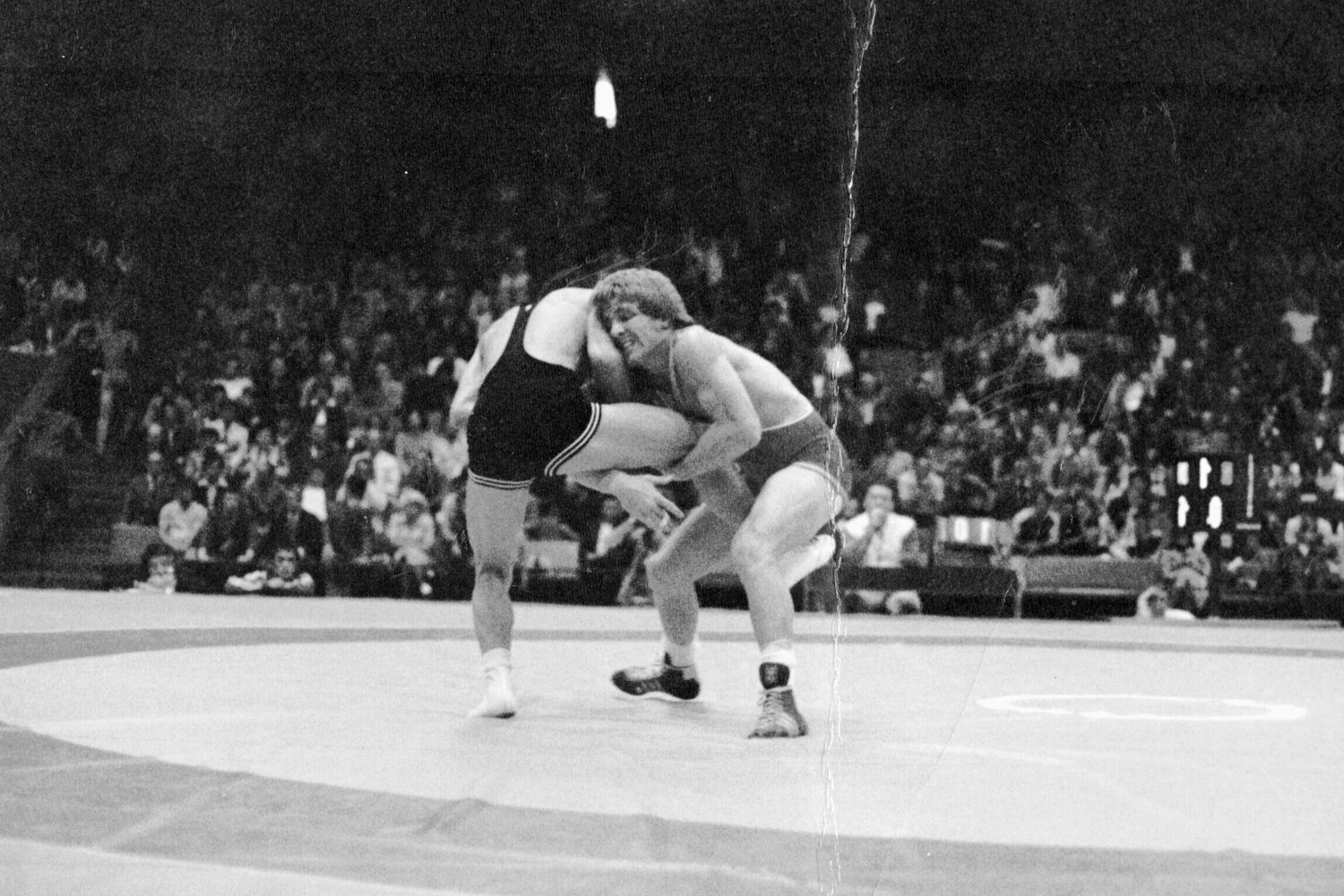
- Clive Llewellyn - 1975 Silver Medallist, Pan American Games (68 kg)

Personal information
- Full name: Clive O. Llewellyn
- Nationality: Canadian
- Born: 27 March 1953 (age 73) Eldoret, Kenya
- Education: University of Western Ontario (B.A., LL.B.) Lakehead University (M.A.)
- Occupations: Lawyer, wrestler
- Years active: 1975–1988 (wrestling), 1983–present (law)
- Height: 174 cm (5 ft 9 in)
- Weight: 80 kg (176 lb)
- Website: Llewellyn Law

Sport
- Sport: Wrestling
- Event: Men's freestyle 68 kg
- Club: Calgary Wrestling Club, and Champions Creed MMA
- Now coaching: Founder and coach, Calgary Wrestling Club; Calgary Heat Wrestling Society; Champions Creed MMA

Clive Llewellyn (born 27 March 1953) is a Canadian former freestyle wrestler, wrestling administrator, coach and lawyer. He represented Canada in the men's freestyle 68 kg category at the 1976 Summer Olympics in Montreal. He was also selected for Canada's team for the 1980 Summer Olympics in Moscow, but did not compete because Canada participated in the boycott of the Games.

Llewellyn won a silver medal in the 68 kg freestyle category at the 1975 Pan American Games and placed fourth in the same weight category at the 1978 Commonwealth Games. He also represented Canada at the 1975 World Wrestling Championships. He later became involved in wrestling administration and coaching, serving as secretary-treasurer of Wrestling Canada Lutte from 2005 to 2007 and as its president from 2007 to 2011.

Beyond his athletic career, Llewellyn is a lawyer specializing in civil, corporate and commercial litigation. He holds a Bachelor of Laws degree from the University of Western Ontario, a Master of Arts in Economics from Lakehead University, and a Bachelor of Arts (Honours) from the University of Western Ontario. Since 2010, he has operated his own law firm in Calgary, offering a variety of legal services to clients.

Llewellyn is also known for his commitment to pro bono work, providing legal services to resource-constrained clients and community organizations. He has supported amateur sport through coaching, club development and administrative service, including founding and coaching several wrestling clubs in Toronto and Calgary.

== Education and legal career ==
Llewellyn wrestled while attending both the University of Western Ontario and Lakehead University. In 1979, while still a member of the Canadian national wrestling team, he entered law school at Western Ontario. He completed his law degree before relocating to Calgary in 1982.

Llewellyn holds a Bachelor of Laws degree from the University of Western Ontario, a Master of Arts in Economics from Lakehead University, and a Bachelor of Arts (Honours) from the University of Western Ontario. Before entering legal practice, he worked as an economist with the Ontario Economic Council.

He was admitted to the Alberta Bar in 1983 and has practised primarily in civil, corporate and commercial litigation. He has represented clients at multiple levels of the Canadian court system, including the Supreme Court of Canada. Since 2010, Llewellyn has operated his own law firm in Calgary.

== Wrestling career ==
=== Early and international career ===
Llewellyn wrestled in high school and later competed for the University of Western Ontario, Lakehead University and the Canadian national wrestling team. At Western, he wrestled under coach Glynn Leyshon and was later inducted into the Western Wrestling Wall of Honour in 1987.

In 1975, Llewellyn represented Canada at the World Wrestling Championships and won the silver medal in the 68 kg freestyle category at the Pan American Games in Mexico City.

=== 1976 Summer Olympics ===
At the 1976 Summer Olympics in Montreal, Llewellyn competed in the men's lightweight freestyle event, which had an upper weight limit of 68 kg.

Llewellyn lost his opening bout to Cuba's José Ramos by fall. In the following round, he lost a 7–5 decision to Hungary's János Kocsis and was eliminated from the competition.

=== 1978 Commonwealth Games and 1980 Olympic team ===
Llewellyn placed fourth in the 68 kg freestyle category at the 1978 Commonwealth Games in Edmonton.

He remained a member of the Canadian national team while attending law school at Western Ontario beginning in 1979. He was subsequently selected as a member of Canada's wrestling team for the 1980 Moscow Olympics. Canada boycotted the Games, and Llewellyn did not compete in Moscow.

== Coaching and wrestling administration ==
In the late 1970s, Llewellyn founded the Metro Toronto Wrestling Club and coached the University of Toronto wrestling team while continuing to compete as a member of the Canadian national team.

After relocating to Calgary, Llewellyn founded the Calgary Wrestling Club in 1984 and served as its organizer and coach through 1990. He later helped establish and coach the Calgary Heat Wrestling Society in 1991 and the Calgary Rebels Wrestling Society in 1992. He also served as a director of the King of the Mat Wrestling Club from 2004 to 2010.

His provincial administrative positions included service on the executive committees of the Ontario Amateur Wrestling Association from 1978 to 1979 and the Alberta Amateur Wrestling Association from 1983 to 1987. He was treasurer of the Alberta association from 1984 to 1985, a director of the Calgary Amateur Wrestling Association from 1985 to 1993, and president of the Calgary association from 1991 to 1992.

At the national level, Llewellyn served as an athlete representative to Wrestling Canada Lutte, then known as the Canadian Amateur Wrestling Association, in 1976 and 1977. He later served as secretary-treasurer from 2005 to 2007 and president from 2007 to 2011.

Llewellyn also represented wrestling on the Canadian Olympic Association's Athlete Advisory Council from 1980 to 1984. He participated in the 1988 Olympic torch relay and attended the Olympic Academy of Canada in 1992.

By 2008, Llewellyn was serving on the Legal Commission of the international wrestling federation then known as FILA, now United World Wrestling. United World Wrestling continues to maintain an institutional person profile for him, although its public profile does not provide his commission dates.

In July 2014, Llewellyn was elected vice-chair of the Commonwealth Wrestling Association for a four-year term.

== Contributions and recognitions ==
Llewellyn was inducted into Western Wrestling's Wall of Honour in 1987.

On 21 March 2015, he was inducted into the Wrestling Canada Lutte Hall of Fame in the Builder's Section as an administrator. The induction recognized his work in club development, coaching and wrestling governance at the local, provincial, national and international levels.

Llewellyn founded the Metro Toronto Wrestling Club and several wrestling organizations in Calgary. His law-firm biography also states that he received the Silver Star from the International Amateur Wrestling Federation for service to wrestling.

== Achievements ==
- 1975 – Silver medallist, Pan American Games (68 kg)
- 1975 – Competitor, World Wrestling Championships
- 1976 – Olympic Games, Montreal (freestyle 68 kg)
- 1976–1977 – Athlete representative, Wrestling Canada Lutte, formerly CAWA
- 1977 – Founder, Metro Toronto Wrestling Club
- Late 1970s – Coach, University of Toronto wrestling team
- 1978 – Fourth place, Commonwealth Games (68 kg)
- 1978–1979 – Ontario Amateur Wrestling Association Executive Committee member
- 1980 – Member of Canada's Olympic wrestling team for the boycotted Moscow Games
- 1980–1984 – Wrestling representative, Canadian Olympic Association Athlete Advisory Council
- 1983–1987 – Alberta Amateur Wrestling Association Executive Committee member
- 1984–1990 – Founder, organizer and coach, Calgary Wrestling Club
- 1984–1985 – Treasurer, Alberta Amateur Wrestling Association
- 1985–1993 – Director, Calgary Amateur Wrestling Association
- 1987 – Inducted into the Western Wrestling Wall of Honour
- 1988 – Olympic torch runner
- 1991 – Founder, organizer and coach, Calgary Heat Wrestling Society
- 1991–1992 – President, Calgary Amateur Wrestling Association
- 1992 – Founder, organizer and coach, Calgary Rebels Wrestling Society
- 1992 – Participant, Olympic Academy of Canada
- 2004–2010 – Director, King of the Mat Wrestling Club
- 2005–2007 – Secretary-treasurer, Wrestling Canada Lutte, formerly CAWA
- 2007–2011 – President, Wrestling Canada Lutte, formerly CAWA
- By 2008 – Member, Legal Commission of United World Wrestling, formerly FILA
- From 2011 – Past president, Wrestling Canada Lutte
- 2014 – Elected vice-chair of the Commonwealth Wrestling Association
- 2015 – Inducted into the Wrestling Canada Lutte Hall of Fame as a builder-administrator
