= Egattur (Tiruvallur District) =

- Suburb
- Location in Chennai, India Egattur (India)
- Coordinates: 13.108435°N 79.885862°E
- Country: India
- State: Tamil Nadu
- District: Tiruvallur District
- Metro: Chennai
- Talukas: Thiruvallur

Government
  - Body: DTCP

Languages
  - Official: Tamil
- Time zone: UTC+5:30 (IST)
- PIN: 631203
- Lok Sabha constituency: Sriperumbudur
- Vidhan Sabha constituency: Thiruvallur
- Planning agency: DTCP

Egattur is a neighborhood in Chennai, India. It is a village in Tiruvallur district of Tamil Nadu, located on the western outskirts of Chennai. In the 2011 census it had a population of 4842 in 1251 houses.
