= Brian Renken =

Canadian wrestler (born 1955)

Personal information
- Full name: Brian Henry Renken
- Born: 21 June 1955 (age 71) Fort William, Ontario, Canada
- Education: Lakeview High School; University of Western Ontario; University of Ottawa
- Height: 178 cm (5 ft 10 in)

Sport
- Sport: Wrestling
Medal record
Men's Greco-Roman wrestling
Representing Canada
Pan American Games
Bronze medal – third place	1979 San Juan	74 kg
Commonwealth Games
Bronze medal – third place	1982 Brisbane	74 kg
Canada Winter Games
Gold medal – first place	1975 Lethbridge	welterweight

Brian Henry Renken (born 21 June 1955) is a Canadian wrestler. He competed in two events at the 1976 Summer Olympics.
