= Clark Davis (wrestler) =

Canadian wrestler (born 1957)

Personal information
- Born: 15 May 1957 (age 69) Calgary, Canada
- Height: 182 cm (6 ft 0 in)

Sport
- Country: Canada
- Sport: Wrestling
Medal record
Men's freestyle wrestling
Representing Canada
Commonwealth Games
Gold medal – first place	1982 Brisbane	90 kg
Gold medal – first place	1986 Edinburgh	100 kg
Pan American Games
Silver medal – second place	1979 San Juan	82 kg
Summer Universiade
Silver medal – second place	1981 Bucharest	90 kg

Clark Davis (born 15 May 1957) is a Canadian former wrestler who competed in the 1984 Summer Olympics and in the 1988 Summer Olympics.
