= Keith Haward =

British wrestler (born 1951)

Personal information
- Nationality: British (English)
- Born: 28 June 1951 (age 75) Dartford, England
- Height: 173 cm (5 ft 8 in)
- Weight: 74 kg (163 lb)

Sport
- Sport: Wrestling
Medal record
Men's freestyle wrestling
Representing England
Commonwealth Games
Bronze medal – third place	1978 Edmonton	74 kg

Keith G. Haward (born 28 June 1951) is a male retired British wrestler who competed at the 1976 Summer Olympics.

== Biography ==
At the 1976 Olympic Games in Montreal, he participated in the men's freestyle 74 kg.

Haward also represented England and won a bronze medal in the 74 kg welterweight division, at the 1978 Commonwealth Games in Edmonton, Canada.

Haward was a four-times winner of the British Wrestling Championships in 1975, 1976, 1977 and 1978.
