= Murray Avery =

New Zealand wrestler

Personal information
- Born: Murray Gordon Avery
- Relative: Clinton Avery (son)

Sport
- Country: New Zealand; Australia
- Sport: Freestyle wrestling
Medal record
Men's wrestling
Representing New Zealand
Commonwealth Games
Bronze medal – third place	1978 Edmonton	Heavyweight
Representing Australia
Commonwealth Games
Bronze medal – third place	1982 Brisbane	Heavyweight

Murray Gordon Avery is a former New Zealand freestyle wrestler. He won a bronze medal representing New Zealand in the heavyweight division at the 1978 Commonwealth Games in Edmonton. Four years later, he wrestled for Australia at the 1982 Commonwealth Games in Brisbane, once again winning the bronze medal in the heavyweight division.

Avery subsequently returned to New Zealand to live in Rotorua. With his wife, Maryann, he had three children, including professional racing cyclist Clinton Avery.
