= Barry Oldridge =

New Zealand wrestler

Personal information
- Nationality: New Zealand
- Born: 31 August 1950 (age 75) Featherston, New Zealand

Sport
- Sport: Wrestling

Barry Oldridge (born 31 August 1950) is a New Zealand wrestler. He competed in the men's freestyle 57 kg at the 1976 Summer Olympics.
