= Albert Patrick (wrestler) =

British wrestler

Personal information
- Nationality: British (Scottish)
- Born: c.1950 Cupar, Scotland
- Height: 191 cm (6 ft 3 in)

Sport
- Sport: Wrestling
Medal record
Men's freestyle wrestling
Representing Scotland
Commonwealth Games
Silver medal – second place	1978 Edmonton	Super-heavyweight
Silver medal – second place	1986 Edinburgh	Super-heavyweight
Bronze medal – third place	1982 Brisbane	Super-heavyweight

Albert Patrick (born c.1950) is a former freestyle wrestler from Scotland who competed at three Commonwealth Games, winning medals at all three editions and was the flag bearer for Scotland at the 1986 Games.

== Biography ==
Patrick, born in Cupar, represented the Scottish team at the 1978 Commonwealth Games in Edmonton, Canada, where he competed in the super-heavyweight category and won a silver medal.

He represented the Scottish team again at the 1982 Commonwealth Games in Brisbane, Australia, where he competed in the super-heavyweight class, winning a bronze medal. and then represented the Scottish team for a third time at the 1986 Commonwealth Games in Edinburgh, Scotland, where he competed in the super-heavyweight category, winning a silver medal.

Patrick was a four-times winner of the British Wrestling Championships at super-heavyweight in 1981, 1984, 1985 and 1988.

He was a chief inspector with the Metropolitan Police by profession and was the first wrestler to carry the flag for Scotland at the Commonwealth Games.
