= Bob Robinson (wrestler) =

Canadian wrestler (born 1958)

Bob Robinson (born 10 September 1958) is a Canadian former wrestler who competed in the 1984 Summer Olympics. Robinson was born in Montreal, Quebec, Canada.
