= Mark Dunbar =

British wrestler (born 1961)

Personal information
- Nationality: British (English)
- Born: 1 June 1961 (age 65) Blackburn, England
- Height: 168 cm (5 ft 6 in)
- Weight: 62 kg (137 lb)

Sport
- Sport: Wrestling
- Club: Bolton Olympic Wrestling Club
Medal record
Men's freestyle wrestling
Representing England
Commonwealth Games
Bronze medal – third place	1978 Edmonton	48 kg

Mark Anthony Dunbar (born 1 June 1961) is a male retired British wrestler.

== Wrestling career ==
Dunbar competed at the 1980 Summer Olympics and the 1984 Summer Olympics. He represented England and won a bronze medal in the 48kg light flyweight division, at the 1978 Commonwealth Games in Edmonton, Alberta, Canada. Four years later he represented England again but in the 62kg featherweight division, where he finished in fifth place, at the 1982 Commonwealth Games in Brisbane, Australia.

Dunbar was a five-times winner of the British Wrestling Championships in 1978, 1979, 1980, 1982 and 1985.
