= Michael Barry (wrestler) =

Canadian wrestler (born 1954)

Personal information
- Born: 28 June 1954 (age 72) Saint John, New Brunswick, Canada

Sport
- Sport: Wrestling

Michael Barry (born 28 June 1954) is a Canadian wrestler. He competed in the men's freestyle 57 kg at the 1976 Summer Olympics.
