= Steve Reinsfield =

New Zealand wrestler

Personal information
- Nationality: New Zealand
- Born: 19 April 1963 (age 63) Auckland, New Zealand

Sport
- Sport: Wrestling

Steve Reinsfield (born 19 April 1963) is a New Zealand wrestler. He competed in the men's freestyle 62 kg at the 1988 Summer Olympics. He won the silver medal in the light flyweight at the 1982 Commonwealth Games and the silver medal in the bantamweight at the 1986 Commonwealth Games. He also competed at the World Wrestling Championships in 1982, 1987 and 1991.

He is a brother of fellow wrestler Ken Reinsfield.
