= Mick Pikos =

Australian wrestler

Personal information
- Nationality: Australian
- Citizenship: Australia
- Born: 21 June 1954 (age 72) Kalymnos, Greece, Greece
- Height
- Weight

Sport
- Country: Australia
- Sport: Wrestling
Medal record
CommonwealthGames
| Silver medal – second place | 1978 Edmonton | Men's Light Heavyweight |

Mick Pikos (born 21 June 1954) is an Australian former wrestler who competed in the 1980 Summer Olympics and in the 1996 Summer Olympics.
