= Zsigmond Kelevitz =

Australian freestyle wrestler (born 1954)

Personal information
- Born: 1 January 1954 (age 72)
- Height: 174 cm (5 ft 9 in)
- Weight: 68 kg (150 lb)
Medal record
Wrestling
Representing Australia
Commonwealth Games
Gold medal – first place	1978 Edmonton	Lightweight
Silver medal – second place	1982 Brisbane	Lightweight
Silver medal – second place	1986 Edinburgh	Lightweight

Zsigmond Kelevitz (born 1 January 1954) is an Australian freestyle wrestler who competed at three Olympic Games and three Commonwealth Games.

== Major championships ==
He competed at the 1976 Montreal, 1980 Moscow and 1984 Los Angeles Olympics in the lightweight, or 68 kg division. His best result was fifth in 1984.

At the Commonwealth Games, he won Australia's first wrestling gold medal since 1954 when he won the lightweight division at the 1978 Edmonton Games and then won silver medals in the same weight division at the 1982 Brisbane and 1986 Edinburgh Games.

His first Olympic Games: Montreal 1976

World Championship 1979: 68 kg. Freestyle (6th)

Commonwealth Games 1982: 68 kg. Freestyle (2nd)

World Championship 1982: 68 kg. Freestyle (9th)

World Championship 1983: 68 kg. Freestyle (13th)

Commonwealth Games 1986: 68 kg. Freestyle (2nd)

Oceania Championship: 68 kg. Freestyle (1st).
