= Brian Aspen =

British wrestler (born 1959)

Personal information
- Nationality: British (English)
- Born: 6 April 1959 (age 67) Bolton, England

Sport
- Sport: Amateur wrestling
Medal record
Men's freestyle wrestling
Representing England
Commonwealth Games
Gold medal – first place	1982 Brisbane	57 kg
Bronze medal – third place	1978 Edmonton	62 kg
Bronze medal – third place	1986 Edinburgh	57 kg

Brian Aspen (born 6 April 1959) is a British retired amateur wrestler.

== Wrestling career ==
He competed at the 1980 Summer Olympics and the 1984 Summer Olympics. He appeared in four Commonwealth Games winning three medals.

The first medal (a bronze) came representing England in the 62 kg featherweight division, at the 1978 Commonwealth Games in Edmonton, Canada. Four years later he won a gold medal representing England and in the 57 kg bantamweight division, at the 1982 Commonwealth Games in Brisbane, Australia. The third medal (another bronze) was at the 1986 Commonwealth Games in Edinburgh and a fourth Games appearance was at the 1994 Commonwealth Games, where he finished in seventh place.

Aspen was a nine-times winner of the British Wrestling Championships; bantamweight (1981, 1982, 1983), featherweight (1979, 1980, 1984, 1986, 1989) and lightweight in 1994.
