= Walter Koenig (wrestler) =

Australian wrestler (born 1958)

Personal information
- Nationality: Australian
- Born: 2 February 1958 (age 68)

Sport
- Sport: Wrestling
Medal record
CommonwealthGames
Silver medal – second place	1974 Christchurch	Men's Light Flyweight
Silver medal – second place	1978 Edmonton	Men's Middleweight
Silver medal – second place	1982 Brisbane	Men's Middleweight
Silver medal – second place	1986 Edinburgh	Men's Middleweight

Walter Alexander Koenig (born 2 February 1958) is an Australian wrestler. He competed in the men's freestyle 90 kg at the 1988 Summer Olympics.
