= Ken Reinsfield =

New Zealand wrestler (born 1958)

Personal information
- Nationality: New Zealand
- Born: 4 February 1958 (age 68) Auckland, New Zealand

Sport
- Sport: Wrestling

Kenneth Bruce Reinsfield (born 4 February 1958) is a New Zealand wrestler. He competed in the men's freestyle 82 kg at the 1984 Summer Olympics.

== Personal life ==
His younger brother, Steve, is also an Olympic wrestler.

== Rugby League ==
He is the Chairman of NRL club the New Zealand Warriors
