= Ray Takahashi =

Canadian judoka (born 1958)

Personal information
- Born: August 7, 1958 (age 68) Toronto, Ontario
- Height: 1.60 m (5 ft 3 in)
- Weight: 57 kg (126 lb) (2012)

Sport
- Country: Canada
- Sport: Wrestling; Judo
- Rank: Sandan
- Club: London-Western Wrestling Club; Western Ontario Mustangs; Takahashi Dojo
- Updated on 3 September 2012

Hugh Raymond Takahashi (born August 7, 1958) is a wrestler, judoka, coach, lecturer, and author who represented Canada in wrestling at the 1976 and 1984 Summer Olympic Games, the 1982 and 1983 Wrestling World Championships, the 1978 and 1982 Commonwealth Games, and the 1983 Pan-American Games. Takahashi won gold in the Flyweight division at the Commonwealth Games, and placed fourth at his second Olympic Games. He holds 16 Canadian national wrestling titles and was inducted into the Canadian Wrestling Hall of Fame in 1991. He is also ranked san-dan (third-degree black belt) in the Japanese martial art Judo, the son of noted Canadian judoka Masao Takahashi and June Takahashi, and the brother of fellow Olympian Phil Takahashi and Olympic coach Tina Takahashi.

Takahashi is currently a Lecturer in Kinesiology and the head coach of the men's and women's wrestling teams at the University of Western Ontario. In 2005 he co-authored a book titled Mastering Judo with his parents and three siblings, and is credited with researching and writing the first draft of the book.

== Publications ==
- Takahashi, Masao; Family (2005). Mastering Judo. Windsor, Ontario: Human Kinetics. ISBN 073605099X.

== See also ==
- Wrestling in Canada
- Judo in Canada
- List of Canadian judoka
