= Richard DesChatelets =

Canadian wrestler (born 1954)

Richard Deschatelets
Personal information
- Born: 4 April 1954 (age 72) Sturgeon Falls, Ontario, Canada

Sport
- Sport: Wrestling
Medal record
Men's freestyle wrestling
Representing Canada
Pan American Games
Bronze medal – third place	1979 San Juan	90 kg

Richard Deschatelets (born 4 April 1954) is a Canadian wrestler. He competed in the men's freestyle 82 kg at the 1976 Summer Olympics.
