= Wyatt Wishart =

Canadian football player and wrestler

Sport
- Sport: Wrestling
- College team: Concordia University
Medal record
Men's freestyle wrestling
Representing Canada
Commonwealth Games
Gold medal – first place	1978 Edmonton	Heavyweight
Gold medal – first place	1982 Brisbane	Super heavyweight
Pan American Games
Bronze medal – third place	1979 San Juan	+100 kg

Wyatt Wishart is a former Canadian football player and wrestler.

A native of Thunder Bay, Ontario, Wishart was educated at Westgate Collegiate & Vocational Institute and Concordia University, where he was a middle guard on the Stingers varsity football team. He was picked up by the Edmonton Eskimos in the 1981 CFL draft, but was cut before the beginning of the season.

Wishart, a two-time All-Canadian varsity wrestler, won eight Canadian wrestling titles. He was a Pan American Junior Wrestling Champion and claimed two gold medals for Canada at the Commonwealth Games.

In 1993, Wishart was inducted into the Northwestern Ontario Sports Hall of Fame.
