= Ashok Kumar (wrestler, born 1959) =

Indian wrestler

Ashoky Kumar
Personal information
- Nationality: Indian
- Born: 28 October 1959 (age 66)

Sport
- Sport: Wrestling

Ashok Kumar (born 28 October 1959) is an Indian wrestler. He competed in the men's freestyle 52 kg at the 1980 Summer Olympics.
