= Jagmander Singh =

Indian wrestler (born 1956)

Personal information
- Nationality: Indian
- Born: 1 March 1956 (age 69)

Sport
- Sport: Wrestling

Jagmander Singh (born 1 March 1956) is an Indian wrestler. He competed at the 1980 Summer Olympics and the 1984 Summer Olympics.
