= Rajinder Singh (wrestler) =

Indian wrestler

Personal information
- Born: 1 August 1954 (age 72)
Medal record
Men's freestyle wrestling
Representing India
Asian Games
Gold medal – first place	1978 Bangkok	74 kg
Commonwealth Games
Gold medal – first place	1978 Edmonton	74 kg
Gold medal – first place	1982 Brisbane	74 kg

Rajinder Singh (born 1 August 1954) is an Indian former wrestler and policeman. He won the gold medal in the 74 kg weight category at the 1978 Asian Games. He also won gold medals at the 1978 and 1982 Commonwealth Games. He represented India in the 1980 and 1984 Summer Olympics, where he finished fourth after losing the bronze medal match in the men's 74 kg freestyle wrestling event. He was awarded the Arjuna Award, India's second highest sporting honour, in 1979. He later served as a Deputy Superintendent in Haryana Police.
