= Kartar Singh =

Indian wrestler (born 1953)

Katar Singh
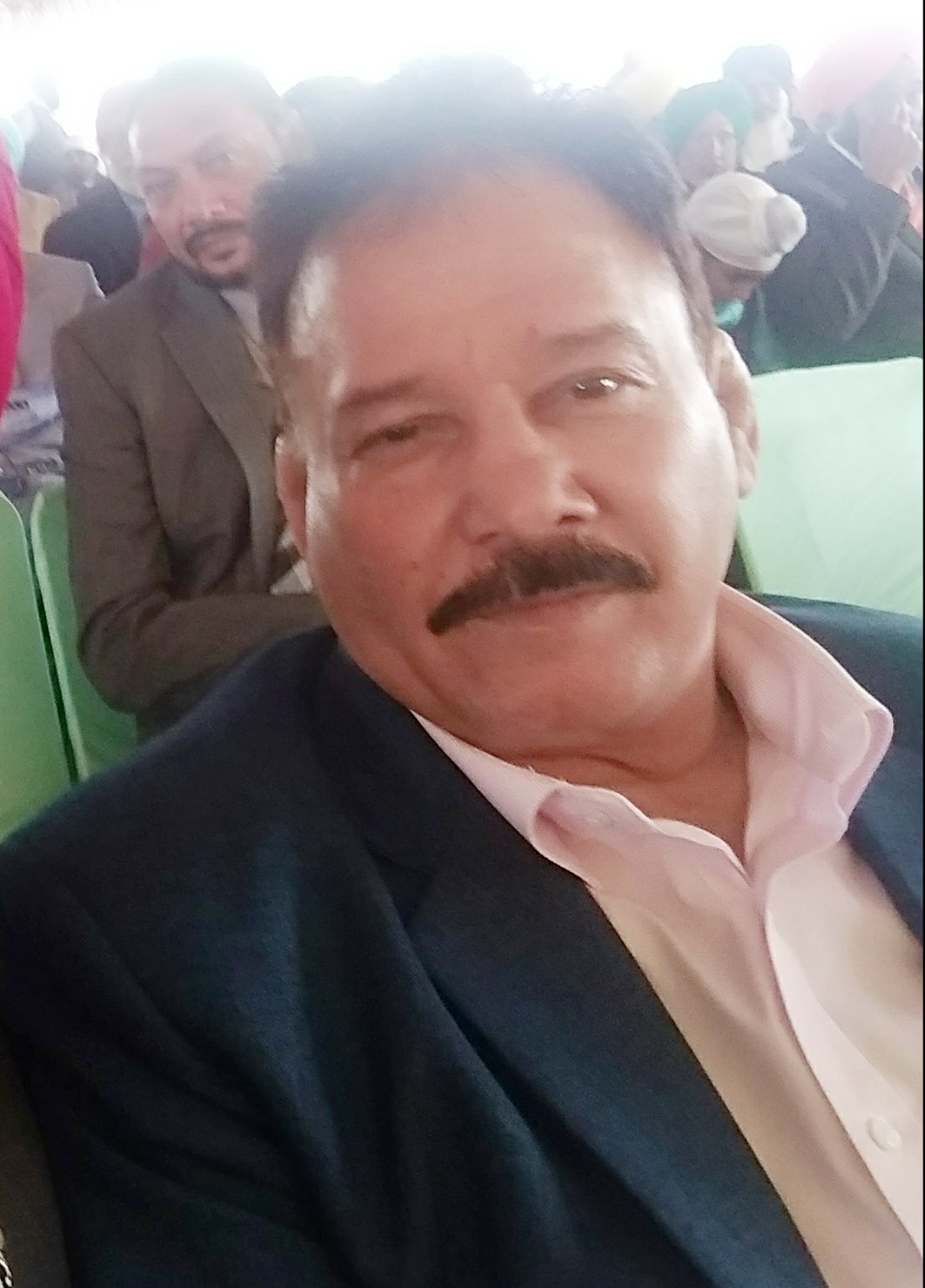

Personal information
- Nationality: India
- Born: 7 October 1953 (age 72) Village Sur Singh, Tarn Taran, Punjab
- Occupation: Wrestler

Kartar Singh
Medal record

Representing India

Men's Freestyle Wrestling

Commonwealth Games
Bronze medal – third place	1978 Edmonton, Alberta	90 kg
Silver medal – second place	1982 Brisbane	90 kg

Asian Games
Gold medal – first place	1978 Bangkok	90 kg
Silver medal – second place	1982 Delhi	90 kg
Gold medal – first place	1986 Seoul	100 kg

Kartar Singh (born 7 October 1953) is an Indian wrestler who won gold medals at the Asian Games in 1978 and 1986. He stood 7th at the 1984 Summer Olympics – Men's freestyle 100 kg Wrestling.

== Life ==
Kartar Singh was born in Sur Singh village of the present-day Tarn Taran district in Punjab. He won gold medals in the 1978 Asian Games held in Bangkok and the 1986 Asian Games held in Seoul. He won a silver medal in the 1982 Asian Games held in Delhi. He won a bronze medal in the 1978 Commonwealth Games in Edmonton and a silver medal in the 1982 Commonwealth Games in Brisbane. Later he moved his residence to Jalandhar, where he worked as Superintendent of Police and as Director Sports of Punjab. Presently he is a master world champion in wrestling and retired as an Inspector General of Police in Punjab in the year 2013.

== Awards and honors ==
In 1982 he received the Arjuna award and in 1987 he received the Padma Shri. Many times he won the Gold Medals in the Veterans World Championships held in Columbia in 1992, Toronto in 1993, Martiony (Switzerland) in 1997 and Bodex (France) in 1998.

Olympic Games
Preceded by Zafar Iqbal	Flagbearer for India; Seoul 1988	Succeeded by Shiny Abraham-Wilson
