= India at the 1970 British Commonwealth Games =

- CG code: IND
- CGA: Indian Olympic Association
- Website: olympic.ind.in

in Edinburgh, Scotland
- Competitors: 30 in 5 sports
- Medals Ranked 6th: Gold 5 Silver 3 Bronze 4 Total 12

British Commonwealth Games appearances
- 1934; 1938; 1950; 1954; 1958; 1962; 1966; 1970; 1974; 1978; 1982; 1986; 1990; 1994; 1998; 2002; 2006; 2010; 2014; 2018; 2022; 2026; 2030

India competed at the 1970 British Commonwealth Games, held in Edinburgh, Scotland, from 16 to 25 July 1970. It was the country's sixth appearance at the Commonwealth Games after making its debut at the 1934 British Empire Games.

The Indian contingent consisted of 30 athletes who competed across five sports. India won twelve medals, including five gold medals, three silver medals and four bronze medals, finishing sixth in the overall medal table.

== Medalists ==
India won twelve medals including five gold, three silver and four bronze medals and finished sixth in the overall medal table. Wrestling was India's most successful sport, accounting for nine of the country's twelve medals, including five gold medals. The Games also marked India's first Commonwealth Games medal in boxing, won by Shivaji Bhonsle in the men's welterweight division.

Medal	Name	Sport	Event
(gold) Gold	Ved Prakash	Wrestling	Light flyweight 48 kg
(gold) Gold	Sudesh Kumar	Wrestling	Flyweight 52 kg
(gold) Gold	Udey Chand	Wrestling	Lightweight 68 kg
(gold) Gold	Mukhtiar Singh	Wrestling	Welterweight 74 kg
(gold) Gold	Harishchandra Birajdar	Wrestling	Middleweight 82 kg
(silver) Silver	Sajjan Singh	Wrestling	Heavyweight 90 kg
(silver) Silver	Bishwanath Singh	Wrestling	Light heavyweight 100 kg
(silver) Silver	Maruti Mane	Wrestling	Super heavyweight over 100 kg
(bronze) Bronze	Randhawa Singh	Wrestling	Featherweight 62 kg
(bronze) Bronze	Alexander Navis	Weightlifting	Featherweight 56 kg
(bronze) Bronze	Mohinder Singh Gill	Athletics	Men's triple jump
(bronze) Bronze	Shivaji Bhonsle	Boxing	Welterweight 67 kg

== Competitors ==
The Indian contingent consisted of 30 athletes who competed across five sports.

Sport	Men	Women	Total
Athletics	9	0	9
Badminton	4	0	4
Boxing	2	—N/a	2
Weightlifting	5	—N/a	5
Wrestling	10	—N/a	10
Total	30	0	30

== Athletics ==
Nine athletes competed in the athletics events. Mohinder Singh Gill won the bronze medal in the men's triple jump.

=== Track ===
Athlete	Event	Qualification		Final	
Athlete	Event	Result	Rank	Result	Rank
Harnek Singh	Men's 5000 metres	DNS		—N/a	
Harnek Singh	Men's marathon	—N/a		2:23:12	16
Dhavamrai Biredar	Men's marathon	—N/a		2:29:18	19
Jagbir Singh	Men's marathon	—N/a		DNF	
Bachan Singh	Men's 20 miles walk	—N/a		DQ	

=== Field ===
Athlete	Event	Qualification		Final	
Athlete	Event	Result	Rank	Result	Rank
Praveen Kumar	Men's discus throw	—N/a		DNS	
Praveen Kumar	Men's hammer throw	—N/a		60.34 m	5
Bhim Singh	Men's high jump	—N/a		2.06 m	4
Labh Singh	Men's long jump	—N/a		DNS	
Labh Singh	Men's triple jump	15.52 m	8	15.70 m	6
Mohinder Singh Gill	Men's long jump	—N/a		DNS	
Mohinder Singh Gill	Men's triple jump	16.07 m	3	15.90 m	3rd place, bronze medalist(s)

=== Combined ===
Athlete	Event	100 m	Long jump	Shot put	High jump	400 m	110 m hurdles	Discus throw	Pole vault	Javelin throw	1500 m	Points	Rank
Vijay Singh Chauhan	Men's decathlon	11.4	6.73 m	10.55 m	1.83 m	50.9	NA	—	—	—	—	3,446	DNF

== Badminton ==
Suresh Goel won the bronze medal in the men's singles event.

Athlete	Event	Round of 16	Quarter-final	Semifinal	Final / BM	
Athlete	Event	Opposition Result	Opposition Result	Opposition Result	Opposition Result	Rank
Satish Bhatia	Men's singles	Purser (NZL); L 7–15, 14–18	Did not advance			
Raman Ghosh	Men's singles	Sharp (ENG); L 6–15, 3–15	Did not advance			
Suresh Goel	Men's singles	Kin (SIN); W 15–3, 15–10	Rollick (CAN); W 16–18, 15–3, 15–12	Whetnall (ENG); L 12–15, 5–15	Sharp (ENG); W 15–15, 15–9	3rd place, bronze medalist(s)
Dipu Ghosh; Raman Ghosh	Men's doubles	—N/a	Boon Bee / Gunalan (MAS); L 14–15, 3–15	Did not advance		
Suresh Goel; Satish Bhatia	Men's doubles	—N/a	Tat Wai / Soon Hooi (MAS); L 1–15, 15–9, 16–17	Did not advance		

Legend

- W – Win; L – Loss;

== Boxing ==
Shivaji Bhonsle won the bronze medal in the welterweight 67 kg category.

Athlete	Event	Preliminary Round	Quarterfinal	Semifinal	Final	
Athlete	Event	Opposition Result	Opposition Result	Opposition Result	Opposition Result	Rank
Muniswami Venu	Lightweight 60 kg	Gillan (SCO); L VPO	Did not advance			
Shivaji Bhonsle	Welterweight 67 kg	Bye	Baldassare (CAN); W VPO	Olulu (KEN); L VPO	—N/a	3rd place, bronze medalist(s)

Legend

- W – Win; L – Loss;
- TKO– Technical knock out
- VPO – Victory by points
- WO – Walkover

== Weightlifting ==
Alexander Navis won the bronze medal in the men's featherweight 60 kg combined event.

Athlete	Event	Result	Rank
Anil Mondal	Flyweight 52 kg	NM	
S. J. Gabriel	Flyweight 52 kg	NM	
Shannug Velliswamy	Bantamweight 56 kg	292.5 kg (645 lb)	5
Alexander Navis	Featherweight 60 kg	335 kg (739 lb)	3rd place, bronze medalist(s)
Arun K. Das	Lightweight 67.5 kg	347.5 kg (766 lb)	5

== Wrestling ==
India won five golds, three silvers and a bronze medal in wrestling at the 1970 British Commonwealth Games.

Freestyle men

Athlete	Event	Competition rounds				Rank
Athlete	Event	Opposition Result	Opposition Result	Opposition Result	Opposition Result	Rank
Ved Prakash	Light flyweight 48 kg	Sadiq (PAK); W VFA	Urquhart (SCO); W VFA	Shand (CAN); W VPO	—N/a	1st place, gold medalist(s)
Sudesh Kumar	Flyweight 52 kg	Nazir (PAK); W VPO	Simpson (SCO); W VFA	Stitt (CAN); W VFA	—N/a	1st place, gold medalist(s)
Bishambar Singh	Bantamweight 57 kg	Singerman (CAN); W VPO	Robinson (ENG); L VPO	Sardar (PAK); L VPO	—N/a	4
Randhawa Singh	Featherweight 62 kg	Brown (AUS); W VPO	Dawes (ENG); W VFA	Bolger (CAN); L VFA	Saeed (PAK); L VFA	3rd place, bronze medalist(s)
Udey Chand	Lightweight 68 kg	Yaqub (PAK); W VPO	Cuirlino (AUS); W VFA	Idle (ENG); W VFA	Sorensen (CAN); W VPO	1st place, gold medalist(s)
Mukhtiar Singh	Welterweight 74 kg	Amey (ENG); W VPO	Mohammed (PAK); W VPO	Wurr (CAN); D	Mackay (NZL); W VPO	1st place, gold medalist(s)
Harishchandra Birajdar	Middleweight 82 kg	Aspin (NZL); W VPO	Grinstead (ENG); W VPO	Mitchell (SCO); W VPO	—N/a	1st place, gold medalist(s)
Sajjan Singh	Light heavyweight 90 kg	Barraclough (ENG); W VPO	McNeill (SCO); W VFA	Pilon (CAN); D	Faiz (PAK); D	2nd place, silver medalist(s)
Bishwanath Singh	Heavyweight 100 kg	Riaz (PAK); W VPO	Hubber (NZL); W VFA	Millard (CAN); L DQ	—N/a	2nd place, silver medalist(s)
Maruti Mane	Super heavyweight +100 kg	Milat (NZL); W VPO	McNamara (ENG); W VPO	Ilahi (PAK); L DQ	—N/a	2nd place, silver medalist(s)

Legend

- W – Win; D – Draw; L – Loss;
- VFA – Victory by fall
- VPO – Victory by points
- DQ – Disqualification
