= Wrestling at the 1970 British Commonwealth Games =

- Venue: Meadowbank Sports Centre
- Location: Edinburgh, Scotland
- Dates: 16 to 25 July 1970

Wrestling at the 1970 British Commonwealth Games was the ninth appearance of Wrestling at the Commonwealth Games.

The events took place in one of the three sports halls forming part of the Meadowbank Sports Centre, which was built specifically for the Games, at a cost of £2.8 million. The sport featured contests in ten weight classes.

India topped the wrestling medal by virtue of winning five of the ten gold medals on offer.

== Medal table ==
* Host nation (Scotland)

Medals won by nation with totals, ranked by number of golds—sortable
| Rank | Nation | Gold | Silver | Bronze | Total |
|---|---|---|---|---|---|
| 1 | India | 5 | 3 | 1 | 9 |
| 2 | Pakistan | 4 | 2 | 2 | 8 |
| 3 | Canada | 1 | 5 | 3 | 9 |
| 4 | England | 0 | 0 | 3 | 3 |
| 5 | New Zealand | 0 | 0 | 2 | 2 |
| 6 | Scotland* | 0 | 0 | 1 | 1 |
| Totals (6 entries) | | 10 | 10 | 12 | 32 |

== Medallists ==
| Weight | Gold | Silver | Bronze |
|---|---|---|---|
| Light flyweight 48kg | Ved Prakash (IND) | Ken Shand (CAN) | Masih Sadiq (PAK); Don Urquhart (SCO) |
| Flyweight 52kg | Sudesh Kumar (IND) | Muhammad Nazir (PAK) | David Stitt (CAN) |
| Bantamweight 57kg | Sardar Muhammad (PAK) | Herbert Singerman (CAN) | Terence Robinson (ENG) |
| Featherweight 62kg | Muhammad Saeed (PAK) | Patrick Bolger (CAN) | Randhawa Singh (IND) |
| Lightweight 68kg | Udey Chand (IND) | Muhammad Yaqub (PAK) | Ole Sorensen (CAN) |
| Welterweight 74kg | Mukhtiar Singh (IND) | Alfred Wurr (CAN) | Gordon Mackay (NZL) |
| Middleweight 82kg | Harishchandra Birajdar (IND) | Nick Schori (CAN) | David Aspin (NZL); Ron Grinstead (ENG) |
| Light heavyweight 90kg | Faiz Muhammad (PAK) | Sajjan Singh (IND) | Claude Pilon (CAN) |
| Heavyweight 100kg | Ed Millard (CAN) | Bishwanath Singh (IND) | Muhammad Riaz (PAK) |
| Super heavyweight +100kg | Ikram Ilahi (PAK) | Maruti Mane (IND) | Denis McNamara (ENG) |

== Results ==
=== Light flyweight 48kg ===
| Winner | Loser | Score |
|---|---|---|
| Ken Shand (CAN) | Don Urquhart (SCO) | fall |
| Ved Prakash (IND) | Masih Sadiq (PAK) | fall |
| Ved Prakash (IND) | Don Urquhart (SCO) | fall |
| Ken Shand (CAN) | Masih Sadiq (PAK) | fall |
| Ved Prakash (IND) | Ken Shand (CAN) | pts |

Final positions: 1. Prakash 2. Shand 3. Sadiq, Urquhart

=== Flyweight 52kg ===
| Winner | Loser | Score |
|---|---|---|
| Muhammad Nazir (PAK) | David Simpson (SCO) | fall |
| David Stitt (CAN) | Nowell James Sinclair (AUS) | pts |
| Sudesh Kumar (IND) | Muhammad Nazir (PAK) | pts |
| David Simpson (SCO) | Nowell James Sinclair (AUS) | fall |
| Muhammad Nazir (PAK) | David Stitt (CAN) | pts |
| Sudesh Kumar (IND) | David Simpson (SCO) | fall |
| Sudesh Kumar (IND) | David Stitt (CAN) | fall |

Final positions: 1. Kumar 2. Nzir 3. Stitt 4. Simpson 5. Sinclair

=== Bantamweight 57kg ===
| Winner | Loser | Score |
|---|---|---|
| Bishambar Singh (IND) | Herbert Singerman (CAN) | pts |
| Sardar Muhammad (PAK) | Robert Grant (SCO) | fall |
| Terence Robinson (ENG) | Bishambar Singh (IND) | pts |
| Herbert Singerman (CAN) | Robert Grant (SCO) | fall |
| Sardar Muhammad (PAK) | Terence Robinson (ENG) | pts |
| Herbert Singerman (CAN) | Terence Robinson (ENG) | pts |
| Sardar Muhammad (PAK) | Herbert Singerman (CAN) | pts |

Final positions: 1. Sardar 2. Singerman 3. Robinson 4. Bishambar 5. Grant

=== Featherweight 62kg ===
| Winner | Loser | Score |
|---|---|---|
| Randhawa Singh (IND) | Raymond Geoffrey Brown (AUS) | pts |
| Patrick Bolger (CAN) | Kenneth Dawes (ENG) | pts |
| Muhammad Saeed (PAK) | John McCourtney (SCO) | fall |
| Randhawa Singh (IND) | Kenneth Dawes (ENG) | fall |
| Raymond Geoffrey Brown (AUS) | John McCourtney (SCO) | pts |
| Muhammad Saeed (PAK) | Patrick Bolger (CAN) | draw |
| Patrick Bolger (CAN) | Randhawa Singh (IND) | fall |
| Muhammad Saeed (PAK) | Raymond Geoffrey Brown (AUS) | pts |
| Muhammad Saeed (PAK) | Randhawa Singh (IND) | fall |

Final positions: 1. Saeed 2. Bolger 3. Ranhawa 4. Brown 5. Dawes, McCourtney

=== Lightweight 68kg ===
| Winner | Loser | Score |
|---|---|---|
| Muhammad Yaqub (PAK) | Tam Anderson (SCO) | pts |
| David Idle (ENG) | (Malta) R. J. Lauri | fall |
| Luigi Cuirlino (AUS) | Ole Sorensen (CAN) | draw |
| Udey Chand (IND) | Muhammad Yaqub (PAK) | pts |
| David Idle (ENG) | Tam Anderson (SCO) | pts |
| Ole Sorensen (CAN) | (Malta) R. J. Lauri | fall |
| Udey Chand (IND) | Luigi Cuirlino (AUS) | fall |
| Muhammad Yaqub (PAK) | David Idle (ENG) | pts |
| Udey Chand (IND) | David Idle (ENG) | fall |
| Muhammad Yaqub (PAK) | Ole Sorensen (CAN) | pts |
| Udey Chand (IND) | Ole Sorensen (CAN) | pts |

Final positions: 1. Chand 2. Yaqub 3. Sorensen 4. Idle 5. Cuirlino 6. Anderson, Lauri

=== Welterweight 74kg ===
| Winner | Loser | Score |
|---|---|---|
| Alfred Wurr (CAN) | Hussein Mohammed (PAK) | pts |
| Gordon Mackay (NZL) | Wesley O'Brien (AUS) | fall |
| Mukhtiar Singh (IND) | Peter Amey (ENG) | pts |
| Alfred Wurr (CAN) | Finlay Buchanan (SCO) | pts |
| Mukhtiar Singh (IND) | Hussein Mohammed (PAK) | pts |
| Gordon Mackay (NZL) | Peter Amey (ENG) | pts |
| Gordon Mackay (NZL) | Finlay Buchanan (SCO) | pts |
| Mukhtiar Singh (IND) | Alfred Wurr (CAN) | draw |
| Alfred Wurr (CAN) | Gordon Mackay (NZL) | pts |
| Mukhtiar Singh (IND) | Gordon Mackay (NZL) | pts |

Final positions: 1. Mukhtiar 2. Wurr 3. Mackay 4. O'Brien 5. Amey, Hussein. 7. Buchanan

=== Middleweight 82kg ===
| Winner | Loser | Score |
|---|---|---|
| Muhammad Bashir (PAK) | Ron Grinstead (ENG) | pts |
| Harishchandra Birajdar (IND) | David Aspin (NZL) | pts |
| Nick Schori (CAN) | Ronnie Mitchell (SCO) | fall |
| David Aspin (NZL) | Ron Grinstead (ENG) | draw |
| Nick Schori (CAN) | Muhammad Bashir (PAK) | pts |
| Harishchandra Birajdar (IND) | Ronnie Mitchell (SCO) | pts |
| Harishchandra Birajdar (IND) | Ron Grinstead (ENG) | pts |
| Nick Schori (CAN) | David Aspin (NZL) | pts |

Final positions: 1. Birajdar 2. Schori 3. Aspin, Grinstead 5. Bashir 6. Mitchell

=== Light heavyweight 90kg ===
| Winner | Loser | Score |
|---|---|---|
| Donald Cantwell (AUS) | Robert Nihon (BAH) | fall |
| Sajjan Singh (IND) | Richard Barraclough (ENG) | pts |
| Faiz Muhammad (PAK) | Alastair McNeill (SCO) | pts |
| Claude Pilon (CAN) | Donald Cantwell (AUS) | pts |
| Sajjan Singh (IND) | Alastair McNeill (SCO) | fall |
| Faiz Muhammad (PAK) | Richard Barraclough (ENG) | pts |
| Sajjan Singh (IND) | Claude Pilon (CAN) | draw |
| Faiz Muhammad (PAK) | Donald Cantwell (AUS) | fall |
| Faiz Muhammad (PAK) | Claude Pilon (CAN) | pts |
| Faiz Muhammad (PAK) | Sajjan Singh (IND) | draw |

Final positions: 1. Faiz 2. Singh 3. Pilon 4. Cantwell 5. Nihon 6. Barraclough, McNeill

=== Heavyweight 100kg ===
| Winner | Loser | Score |
|---|---|---|
| Bishwanath Singh (IND) | Muhammad Riaz (PAK) | pts |
| Ed Millard (CAN) | H. Warren Hubber (NZL) | fall |
| Ed Millard (CAN) | Muhammad Riaz (PAK) | fall |
| Bishwanath Singh (IND) | H. Warren Hubber (NZL) | fall |
| Ed Millard (CAN) | Bishwanath Singh (IND) | disq |

Final positions: 1. Millard 2. Bishwanath 3. Riaz 4. Hubber

- Wallace Booth of Scotland, was forced to withdraw from the heavyweight category because he failed a fitness test shortly before his first match.

=== Super heavyweight +100kg ===
| Winner | Loser | Score |
|---|---|---|
| Ikram Ilahi (PAK) | Merv Holden (CAN) | pts |
| Maruti Mane (IND) | A Tom Milat (NZL) | pts |
| Ikram Ilahi (PAK) | Denis McNamara (ENG) | pts |
| A Tom Milat (NZL) | Merv Holden (CAN) | ret |
| Maruti Mane (IND) | Denis McNamara (ENG) | pts |
| Ikram Ilahi (PAK) | A Tom Milat (NZL) | fall |
| Ikram Ilahi (PAK) | Maruti Mane (IND) | both disq, 3 cautions |

Final positions: 1. Ilahi 2. Mane 3. McNamara 4. Milat 5. Holden
