= Wrestling at the 1962 Asian Games =

- Venue: Ikada Sports Hall
- Dates: 25–30 August 1962
- Competitors: 59 from 8 nations

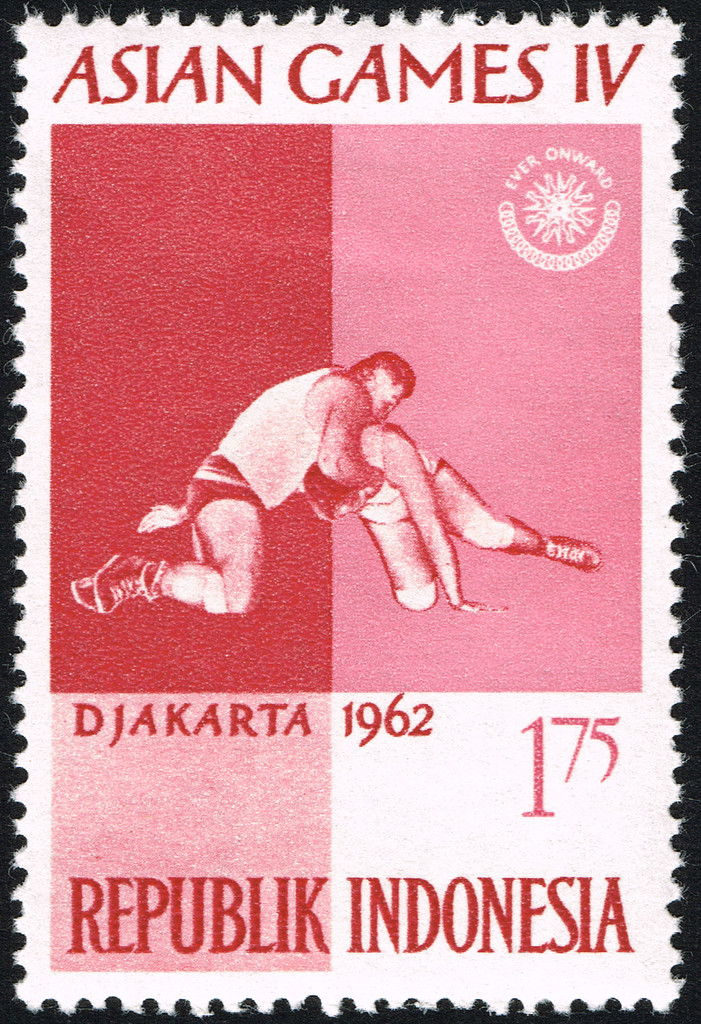
Wrestling at the 1962 Asian Games on a stamp of Indonesia

Wrestling was one of the sports which was held at the 1962 Asian Games at Ikada Sports Hall in Jakarta, Indonesia between 25 and 30 August 1962. The competition included only men's events.

== Medalists ==
=== Freestyle ===
Event	Gold	Silver	Bronze
Flyweight (52 kg)	Noriyuki Harada; Japan	Chang Chang-sun; South Korea	Malwa Singh; India
Bantamweight (57 kg)	Tadashi Asai; Japan	Siraj Din; Pakistan	Choi Young-kil; South Korea
Featherweight (63 kg)	Osamu Watanabe; Japan	Muhammad Akhtar; Pakistan	Mohammad Ebrahim Khedri; Afghanistan
Lightweight (70 kg)	Kazuo Abe; Japan	Udey Chand; India	Ghulam Rasool; Pakistan
Welterweight (78 kg)	Yutaka Kaneko; Japan	Muhammad Bashir; Pakistan	Lakshmikant Pandey; India
Middleweight (87 kg)	Faiz Muhammad; Pakistan	Sajjan Singh; India	Shunichi Kawano; Japan
Light heavyweight (97 kg)	Maruti Mane; India	Haruo Takagi; Japan	Muhammad Niaz; Pakistan
Heavyweight (+97 kg)	Muhammad Saeed; Pakistan	Ganpat Andalkar; India	Jiro Seki; Japan

=== Greco-Roman ===
Event	Gold	Silver	Bronze
Flyweight (52 kg)	Malwa Singh; India	Tsutomu Hanahara; Japan	Mujari; Indonesia
Bantamweight (57 kg)	Masamitsu Ichiguchi; Japan	Siraj Din; Pakistan	Narin Ghume; India
Featherweight (63 kg)	Tokuaki Fujita; Japan	Muhammad Akhtar; Pakistan	Rachman Firdaus; Indonesia
Lightweight (70 kg)	Yoichi Sasaki; Japan	Udey Chand; India	Ghulam Rasool; Pakistan
Welterweight (78 kg)	Yutaka Kaneko; Japan	Muhammad Bashir; Pakistan	Oh Jae-young; South Korea
Middleweight (87 kg)	Shunichi Kawano; Japan	Sajjan Singh; India	Faiz Muhammad; Pakistan
Light heavyweight (97 kg)	Muhammad Niaz; Pakistan	Haruo Takagi; Japan	Shared silver
Light heavyweight (97 kg)	Muhammad Niaz; Pakistan	Maruti Mane; India	Shared silver
Heavyweight (+97 kg)	Ganpat Andalkar; India	Muhammad Saeed; Pakistan	Jiro Seki; Japan

== Medal table ==
Rank	Nation	Gold	Silver	Bronze	Total
1	Japan (JPN)	10	3	3	16
2	Pakistan (PAK)	3	7	4	14
3	India (IND)	3	6	3	12
4	South Korea (KOR)	0	1	2	3
5	Indonesia (INA)	0	0	2	2
6	Afghanistan (AFG)	0	0	1	1
Totals (6 entries)		16	17	15	48

== Participating nations ==
A total of 59 athletes from 8 nations competed in wrestling at the 1962 Asian Games:

- Afghanistan (7)
- Ceylon (1)
- India (7)
- Indonesia (13)
- Japan (12)
- Pakistan (8)
- Philippines (6)
- South Korea (5)
