= Athletics at the 1970 British Commonwealth Games – Men's triple jump =

Men's triple jump at the 1970 British Commonwealth Games
- Venue: Meadowbank Stadium, Edinburgh
- Dates: 24 and 25 July 1970

Medalists
gold medal	Phil May	Australia
silver medal	Mick McGrath	Australia
bronze medal	Mohinder Singh Gill	India

The men's triple jump event at the 1970 British Commonwealth Games was held on 24 and 25 July at the Meadowbank Stadium in Edinburgh, Scotland.

== Medallists ==
Gold	Silver	Bronze
Phil May; Australia	Mick McGrath; Australia	Mohinder Singh Gill; India

== Results ==
=== Qualification ===
Qualification for final: q in Notes column
Rank	Name	Nationality	Distance	Notes
1	Mick McGrath	Australia	16.09	q
2	Samuel Igun	Nigeria	16.08	q
3	Mohinder Singh Gill	India	16.07	q
4	Phil May	Australia	15.87	q
5	Tony Wadhams	England	15.80	q
6	Patrick Onyango Sumba	Kenya	15.65	q
7	Johnston Amoah	Ghana	15.53	q
8	Labh Singh	India	15.52	q
9	Abraham Munabi	Uganda	15.51	q
10	Lennox Burgher	Jamaica	15.19	q
11=	Dave Norris	New Zealand	15.01	q
11=	Alan Lerwill	England	15.01	q
11=	Reynold Edwards	Antigua and Barbuda	15.01	q
14	Hamish Robertson	Scotland	14.91	
15	Obed Gardiner	Bahamas	14.79	
16	George Ogan	Nigeria	14.70	
17	Graham Webb	Wales	14.64	
18	Henry Jackson	Jamaica	14.63	
19	John Kanondo	Tanzania	14.61	
20	Don Miller	Bahamas	14.52	
21	Granville Buckley	Antigua and Barbuda	14.48	
22	Jack Buga	Uganda	14.46	
23	Raphael Mlewa	Tanzania	13.99	
24	Graham Hamlyn	England	13.96	
25	Orlando Williams	Sierra Leone	13.48	
26	Samson Mubangalala	Zambia	13.39	
	Raymond Anthony	Grenada	NM	
	Sheikh Faye	Gambia	DNS	

=== Final ===
Final results
Rank	Name	Nationality	Distance	Notes
1st place, gold medalist(s)	Phil May	Australia	16.72	GR
2nd place, silver medalist(s)	Mick McGrath	Australia	16.41	
3rd place, bronze medalist(s)	Mohinder Singh Gill	India	15.90	
4	Abraham Munabi	Uganda	15.87	
5	Johnston Amoah	Ghana	15.73	
6	Labh Singh	India	15.70	
7	Samuel Igun	Nigeria	15.67	
8	Patrick Onyango Sumba	Kenya	15.61	
9	Lennox Burgher	Jamaica	15.23	
10	Alan Lerwill	England	15.19	
11	Dave Norris	New Zealand	14.46	
12	Reynold Edwards	Antigua and Barbuda	14.30	
13	Tony Wadhams	England	13.70	
