= Athletics at the 1970 British Commonwealth Games – Men's long jump =

Men's long jump at the 1970 British Commonwealth Games
- Venue: Meadowbank Stadium, Edinburgh
- Dates: 21 and 22 July 1970

Medalists
gold medal	Lynn Davies	Wales
silver medal	Phil May	Australia
bronze medal	Alan Lerwill	England

The men's long jump event at the 1970 British Commonwealth Games was held on 21 and 22 July at the Meadowbank Stadium in Edinburgh, Scotland.

== Medallists ==
Medallists
Gold	Silver	Bronze
Lynn Davies; Wales	Phil May; Australia	Alan Lerwill; England

== Results ==
=== Qualification ===
Qualification for the final—top twelve (q)
Rank	Name	Nationality	Distance	Notes
1	Phil May	Australia	8.03w	q
2	Alan Lerwill	England	7.78	q
3	Geoff Hignett	England	7.56	q
4	Michael Ahey	Ghana	7.54	q
5	Lynn Davies	Wales	7.45	q
6	Dave Norris	New Zealand	7.43	q
7	George Ogan	Nigeria	7.41	q
8	Patrick Onyango Sumba	Kenya	7.21	q
9	Hamish Robertson	Scotland	7.14	q
10	Gwyn Williams	Wales	7.09	q
11	Abraham Munabi	Uganda	7.07	q
12	David Walker	Scotland	7.05	q
13	Granville Buckley	Antigua and Barbuda	7.04	
14	Sheikh Faye	Gambia	7.02	
15	Raphael Mlewa	Tanzania	6.93	
16	Peter Ndovi	Malawi	6.92	
17	Obed Gardiner	Bahamas	6.88	
18	Calvin Greenaway	Antigua and Barbuda	6.84	
19	Reynold Edwards	Antigua and Barbuda	6.61	
20	Jack Buga	Uganda	6.57	
21	Orlando Williams	Sierra Leone	6.53	
22	Don Miller	Bahamas	6.50	
23	Jerry Wisdom	Bahamas	6.41	
	Rick Cuttell	Canada	DNS	
	Raymond Anthony	Grenada	DNS	
	Labh Singh	India	DNS	
	Mohinder Singh Gill	India	DNS	
	John Kanondo	Tanzania	DNS	

=== Final ===
Final results
Rank	Name	Nationality	Distance	Notes
1st place, gold medalist(s)	Lynn Davies	Wales	8.06	
2nd place, silver medalist(s)	Phil May	Australia	7.94	(Note: Second best jump: 7.89 m)
3rd place, bronze medalist(s)	Alan Lerwill	England	7.94	(Note: Second best jump: 7.86 m)
4	Michael Ahey	Ghana	7.78	
5	Dave Norris	New Zealand	7.64	
6	David Walker	Scotland	7.51	
7	Geoff Hignett	England	7.49	
8	Hamish Robertson	Scotland	7.37	
9	George Ogan	Nigeria	7.15	
10	Gwyn Williams	Wales	7.14	
11	Patrick Onyango Sumba	Kenya	7.10	
12	Abraham Munabi	Uganda	7.05	
