= Wrestling at the 1962 Asian Games – Men's freestyle 87 kg =

Wrestling event at the 1962 Asian Games

Men's freestyle 87 kg at the 1962 Asian Games
- Venue: Ikada Sports Hall
- Dates: 28–29 August 1962
- Competitors: 6 from 6 nations

Medalists
| gold medal | Faiz Muhammad | Pakistan |
| silver medal | Sajjan Singh | India |
| bronze medal | Shunichi Kawano | Japan |

The men's freestyle 87 kilograms (middleweight) freestyle wrestling competition at the 1962 Asian Games in Jakarta was held from 28 to 29 August 1962.

The competition used a form of negative points tournament, with negative points given for any result short of a fall. Accumulation of 6 negative points eliminated the wrestler. When three or fewer wrestlers remained, they advanced to a final round, with only preliminary results amongst them carried forward.

== Schedule ==
All times are Western Indonesian Time (UTC+07:30)

| Date | Time | Event |
|---|---|---|
| Tuesday, 28 August 1962 | 08:00 | 1st round |
| Wednesday, 29 August 1962 | 08:00 | 2nd round |
| Wednesday, 29 August 1962 | 14:30 | 3rd round |

== Results ==
=== 1st round ===
| TBM | | BM | | BM | | TBM |
|---|---|---|---|---|---|---|
| 0 | Mohammad Asif Kohkan (AFG) | 0 | Fall 3:00 | 4 | Soewandi (INA) | 4 |
| 3 | Shunichi Kawano (JPN) | 3 | Decision | 1 | Sajjan Singh (IND) | 1 |
| 4 | Fernando Garcia (PHI) | 4 | Fall 2:00 | 0 | Faiz Muhammad (PAK) | 0 |

=== 2nd round ===
| TBM | | BM | | BM | | TBM |
|---|---|---|---|---|---|---|
| 4 | Mohammad Asif Kohkan (AFG) | 4 | Fall 3:59 | 0 | Shunichi Kawano (JPN) | 3 |
| 6 | Soewandi (INA) | 2 | Draw | 2 | Fernando Garcia (PHI) | 6 |
| 4 | Sajjan Singh (IND) | 3 | Decision | 1 | Faiz Muhammad (PAK) | 1 |

=== 3rd round ===
| TBM | | BM | | BM | | TBM |
|---|---|---|---|---|---|---|
| 7 | Mohammad Asif Kohkan (AFG) | 3 | Decision | 1 | Sajjan Singh (IND) | 5 |
| 5 | Shunichi Kawano (JPN) | 2 | Draw | 2 | Faiz Muhammad (PAK) | 3 |

== Final standing ==
| Rank | Athlete | Round | | | TBM | FBM |
| Rank | Athlete | 1 | 2 | 3 | TBM | FBM |
|---|---|---|---|---|---|---|
| 1st place, gold medalist(s) | Faiz Muhammad (PAK) | 0 | 1 | 2 | 3 | 3 |
| 2nd place, silver medalist(s) | Sajjan Singh (IND) | 1 | 3 | 1 | 5 | 4 |
| 3rd place, bronze medalist(s) | Shunichi Kawano (JPN) | 3 | 0 | 2 | 5 | 5 |
| 4 | Mohammad Asif Kohkan (AFG) | 0 | 4 | 3 | 7 | |
| 5 | Soewandi (INA) | 4 | 2 | | 6 | |
| 6 | Fernando Garcia (PHI) | 4 | 2 | | 6 | |
