= Afghanistan at the 1962 Asian Games =

Sporting event delegation

- IOC code: AFG
- NOC: National Olympic Committee of the Islamic Republic of Afghanistan

in Jakarta
- Medals Ranked 13th: Gold 0 Silver 0 Bronze 1 Total 1

Asian Games appearances (overview)
- 1951; 1954; 1958; 1962; 1966; 1970; 1974; 1978; 1982; 1986; 1990; 1994; 1998; 2002; 2006; 2010; 2014; 2018; 2022; 2026

Afghanistan participated in the 1962 Asian Games held in the city of Jakarta, Indonesia from 24 August 1962 to 4 September 1962. Afghanistan ranked 13th with a solitary bronze medal in this edition of the Asiad.

Afghanistan had sent a contingent of 11 athletes to this Asiad. The lone bronze medal came with an outstanding performance shown by Mohammad Ebrahim Khedri in the Men's freestyle wrestling (63 kg category).

== Medalists ==
Medal	Name	Sport	Event
3rd place, bronze medalist(s)	Mohammad Ebrahim Khedri	Wrestling	Freestyle 63 kg

== Wrestling ==
7 wrestlers from Afghanistan participated, from which all were in freestyle wrestling events:

Event	Player	Rank
52 kg	Faiz Mohammad Khaksar	4
57 kg	Ghulam Hazrat	4
63 kg	Mohammad Ebrahim Khedri	3rd place, bronze medalist(s)
70 kg	Abdul Wahab	5
87 kg	Mohammad Asif Kohkan	4
97 kg	Ghulam Mohiddin Gunga	5
+97 kg	Nizamuddin Subhani	5
