= Wrestling at the 1960 Summer Olympics – Men's freestyle light heavyweight =

Wrestling at the Olympics

Men's freestyle light heavyweight at the Games of the XVII Olympiad
- Venue: Basilica of Maxentius
- Dates: 1–6 September 1960
- Competitors: 19 from 19 nations

Medalists
1st place, gold medalist(s)		İsmet Atlı	Turkey
2nd place, silver medalist(s)		Gholam Reza Takhti	Iran
3rd place, bronze medalist(s)		Anatoly Albul	Soviet Union

The men's freestyle light heavyweight competition at the 1960 Summer Olympics in Rome took place from 1 to 6 September at the Basilica of Maxentius. Nations were limited to one competitor. Light heavyweight was the second-heaviest category, including wrestlers weighing 79 to 87 kilograms (174.2 to 191.8 lb).

== Competition format ==
This freestyle wrestling competition continued to use the "bad points" elimination system introduced at the 1928 Summer Olympics for Greco-Roman and at the 1932 Summer Olympics for freestyle wrestling, though adjusted the point values slightly. Wins by fall continued to be worth 0 points and wins by decision continued to be worth 1 point. Losses by fall, however, were now worth 4 points (up from 3). Losses by decision were worth 3 points (consistent with most prior years, though in some losses by split decision had been worth only 2 points). Ties were now allowed, worth 2 points for each wrestler. The elimination threshold was also increased from 5 points to 6 points. The medal round concept, used in 1952 and 1956 requiring a round-robin amongst the medalists even if one or more finished a round with enough points for elimination, was used only if exactly three wrestlers remained after a round—if two competitors remained, they faced off head-to-head; if only one, he was the gold medalist.

== Results ==
=== Round 1 ===
Martina withdrew after his bout.

Bouts

Winner	Nation	Victory Type	Loser	Nation
Anatoly Albul	Soviet Union	Decision	Eugen Holzherr	Switzerland
İsmet Atlı	Turkey	Decision	Valcho Kostov	Bulgaria
György Gurics	Hungary	Decision	Bob Steckle	Canada
Viking Palm	Sweden	Decision	Dieter Rauchbach	United Team of Germany
Sajan Singh	India	Decision	Antonio Marcucci	Italy
Gholam Reza Takhti	Iran	Fall	Ghulam Mohiddin Gunga	Afghanistan
Shunichi Kawano	Japan	Decision	Patrick Parsons	Australia
Manie van Zyl	South Africa	Fall	Gerry Martina	Ireland
Dan Brand	United States	Fall	Maurice Jacquel	France
César Ferreras	Venezuela	Bye	N/A	N/A

Points

Rank	Wrestler	Nation	Start	Earned	Total
1	Dan Brand	United States	0	0	0
1	César Ferreras	Venezuela	0	0	0
1	Gholam Reza Takhti	Iran	0	0	0
1	Manie van Zyl	South Africa	0	0	0
5	Anatoly Albul	Soviet Union	0	1	1
5	İsmet Atlı	Turkey	0	1	1
5	György Gurics	Hungary	0	1	1
5	Shunichi Kawano	Japan	0	1	1
5	Viking Palm	Sweden	0	1	1
5	Sajan Singh	India	0	1	1
11	Eugen Holzherr	Switzerland	0	3	3
11	Valcho Kostov	Bulgaria	0	3	3
11	Antonio Marcucci	Italy	0	3	3
11	Patrick Parsons	Australia	0	3	3
11	Dieter Rauchbach	United Team of Germany	0	3	3
11	Bob Steckle	Canada	0	3	3
17	Ghulam Mohiddin Gunga	Afghanistan	0	4	4
17	Maurice Jacquel	France	0	4	4
19	Gerry Martina	Ireland	0	4	4*

=== Round 2 ===
Bouts

Winner	Nation	Victory Type	Loser	Nation
César Ferreras	Venezuela	Tie	Eugen Holzherr	Switzerland
Anatoly Albul	Soviet Union	Decision	Valcho Kostov	Bulgaria
İsmet Atlı	Turkey	Decision	Bob Steckle	Canada
Viking Palm	Sweden	Fall	György Gurics	Hungary
Sajan Singh	India	Fall	Dieter Rauchbach	United Team of Germany
Antonio Marcucci	Italy	Fall	Ghulam Mohiddin Gunga	Afghanistan
Gholam Reza Takhti	Iran	Fall	Patrick Parsons	Australia
Shunichi Kawano	Japan	Fall	Dan Brand	United States
Manie van Zyl	South Africa	Decision	Maurice Jacquel	France

Points

Rank	Wrestler	Nation	Start	Earned	Total
1	Gholam Reza Takhti	Iran	0	0	0
2	Shunichi Kawano	Japan	1	0	1
2	Viking Palm	Sweden	1	0	1
2	Sajan Singh	India	1	0	1
2	Manie van Zyl	South Africa	0	1	1
6	Anatoly Albul	Soviet Union	1	1	2
6	İsmet Atlı	Turkey	1	1	2
6	César Ferreras	Venezuela	0	2	2
9	Antonio Marcucci	Italy	3	0	3
10	Dan Brand	United States	0	4	4
11	György Gurics	Hungary	1	4	5
11	Eugen Holzherr	Switzerland	3	2	5
13	Valcho Kostov	Bulgaria	3	3	6
13	Bob Steckle	Canada	3	3	6
15	Maurice Jacquel	France	4	3	7
15	Patrick Parsons	Australia	3	4	7
15	Dieter Rauchbach	United Team of Germany	3	4	7
18	Ghulam Mohiddin Gunga	Afghanistan	4	4	8

=== Round 3 ===
Bouts

Winner	Nation	Victory Type	Loser	Nation
Anatoly Albul	Soviet Union	Fall	César Ferreras	Venezuela
İsmet Atlı	Turkey	Decision	Eugen Holzherr	Switzerland
György Gurics	Hungary	Fall	Sajan Singh	India
Viking Palm	Sweden	Decision	Antonio Marcucci	Italy
Gholam Reza Takhti	Iran	Fall	Shunichi Kawano	Japan
Dan Brand	United States	Fall	Manie van Zyl	South Africa

Points

Rank	Wrestler	Nation	Start	Earned	Total
1	Gholam Reza Takhti	Iran	0	0	0
2	Anatoly Albul	Soviet Union	2	0	2
2	Viking Palm	Sweden	1	1	2
4	İsmet Atlı	Turkey	2	1	3
5	Dan Brand	United States	4	0	4
6	György Gurics	Hungary	5	0	5
6	Shunichi Kawano	Japan	1	4	5
6	Sajan Singh	India	1	4	5
6	Manie van Zyl	South Africa	1	4	5
10	César Ferreras	Venezuela	2	4	6
10	Antonio Marcucci	Italy	3	3	6
12	Eugen Holzherr	Switzerland	5	3	8

=== Round 4 ===
Bouts

Winner	Nation	Victory Type	Loser	Nation
İsmet Atlı	Turkey	Decision	Anatoly Albul	Soviet Union
Gholam Reza Takhti	Iran	Fall	György Gurics	Hungary
Viking Palm	Sweden	Decision	Sajan Singh	India
Manie van Zyl	South Africa	Fall	Shunichi Kawano	Japan
Dan Brand	United States	Bye	N/A	N/A

Points

Rank	Wrestler	Nation	Start	Earned	Total
1	Gholam Reza Takhti	Iran	0	0	0
2	Viking Palm	Sweden	2	1	3
3	İsmet Atlı	Turkey	3	1	4
3	Dan Brand	United States	4	0	4
5	Anatoly Albul	Soviet Union	2	3	5
5	Manie van Zyl	South Africa	5	0	5
7	Sajan Singh	India	5	3	8
8	György Gurics	Hungary	5	4	9
8	Shunichi Kawano	Japan	5	4	9

=== Round 5 ===
This round left two wrestlers uneliminated; they advanced to face each other in the final (even though Atlı could not possibly catch Takhti on points—the winner of the final would take the gold medal). Two wrestlers were eliminated tied for third at 6 points; they would compete in a bronze medal bout.

Bouts

Winner	Nation	Victory Type	Loser	Nation
Anatoly Albul	Soviet Union	Decision	Dan Brand	United States
İsmet Atlı	Turkey	Decision	Viking Palm	Sweden
Gholam Reza Takhti	Iran	Fall	Manie van Zyl	South Africa

Points

Rank	Wrestler	Nation	Start	Earned	Total
1	Gholam Reza Takhti	Iran	0	0	0
2	İsmet Atlı	Turkey	4	1	5
3	Anatoly Albul	Soviet Union	5	1	6
3	Viking Palm	Sweden	3	3	6
5	Dan Brand	United States	4	3	7
6	Manie van Zyl	South Africa	5	4	9

=== Round 6 ===
The bronze medal bout ended in a tie, so body weight was used to determine the winner. Albul was lighter and therefore took the bronze medal.

Atlı defeated Takhti in the final, giving the Turkish wrestler the gold medal regardless of points.

Bronze medal bout

Winner	Nation	Victory Type	Loser	Nation
Anatoly Albul	Soviet Union	Tie	Viking Palm	Sweden

Final

Winner	Nation	Victory Type	Loser	Nation
İsmet Atlı	Turkey	Decision	Gholam Reza Takhti	Iran

Points

Rank	Wrestler	Nation	Start	Earned	Total
1st place, gold medalist(s)	İsmet Atlı	Turkey	5	1	6
2nd place, silver medalist(s)	Gholam Reza Takhti	Iran	0	3	3
3rd place, bronze medalist(s)	Anatoly Albul	Soviet Union	6	2	8
4	Viking Palm	Sweden	6	2	8
