= Wrestling at the 1962 Asian Games – Men's freestyle 78 kg =

Men's freestyle 78 kg at the 1962 Asian Games
- Venue: Ikada Sports Hall
- Dates: 28–30 August 1962
- Competitors: 6 from 6 nations

Medalists
gold medal	Yutaka Kaneko	Japan
silver medal	Muhammad Bashir	Pakistan
bronze medal	Lakshmikant Pandey	India

The men's freestyle 78 kilograms (welterweight) freestyle wrestling competition at the 1962 Asian Games in Jakarta was held from 28 to 30 August 1962.

The competition used a form of negative points tournament, with negative points given for any result short of a fall. Accumulation of 6 negative points eliminated the wrestler. When three or fewer wrestlers remained, they advanced to a final round, with only preliminary results amongst them carried forward.

== Schedule ==
All times are Western Indonesian Time (UTC+07:30)

Date	Time	Event
Tuesday, 28 August 1962	08:00	1st round
Wednesday, 29 August 1962	08:00	2nd round
Wednesday, 29 August 1962	14:30	3rd round
Thursday, 30 August 1962	08:00	4th round
Thursday, 30 August 1962	14:30	5th round

== Results ==
=== 1st round ===
TBM		BM		BM		TBM
0	Lakshmikant Pandey (IND)	0	Fall 2:44	4	Oh Jae-young (KOR)	4
4	Uriel Gauvieres (PHI)	4	Fall 1:54	0	Yutaka Kaneko (JPN)	0
0	Muhammad Bashir (PAK)	0	Fall 0:32	4	Doddy Atmadja (INA)	4

=== 2nd round ===
TBM		BM		BM		TBM
0	Lakshmikant Pandey (IND)	0	Fall 4:12	4	Uriel Gauvieres (PHI)	8
8	Oh Jae-young (KOR)	4	Walkover	0	Muhammad Bashir (PAK)	0
0	Yutaka Kaneko (JPN)	0	Fall 1:01	4	Doddy Atmadja (INA)	8

=== 3rd round ===
TBM		BM		BM		TBM
4	Lakshmikant Pandey (IND)	4	Fall 0:45	0	Yutaka Kaneko (JPN)	0
0	Muhammad Bashir (PAK)				Bye	

=== 4th round ===
TBM		BM		BM		TBM
1	Muhammad Bashir (PAK)	1	Decision	3	Lakshmikant Pandey (IND)	7
0	Yutaka Kaneko (JPN)				Bye	

=== 5th round ===
TBM		BM		BM		TBM
2	Yutaka Kaneko (JPN)	2	Draw	2	Muhammad Bashir (PAK)	3
7	Lakshmikant Pandey (IND)				Bye	

== Final standing ==
Rank	Athlete	Round					TBM	FBM
Rank	Athlete	1	2	3	4	5	TBM	FBM
1st place, gold medalist(s)	Yutaka Kaneko (JPN)	0	0	0	Bye	2	2	2
2nd place, silver medalist(s)	Muhammad Bashir (PAK)	0	0	Bye	1	2	3	3
3rd place, bronze medalist(s)	Lakshmikant Pandey (IND)	0	0	4	3	Bye	7	7
4	Doddy Atmadja (INA)	4	4				8	
4	Oh Jae-young (KOR)	4	4				8	
4	Uriel Gauvieres (PHI)	4	4				8	
