= Wrestling at the 1962 Asian Games – Men's freestyle 52 kg =

Men's freestyle 52 kg at the 1962 Asian Games
- Venue: Ikada Sports Hall
- Dates: 28–30 August 1962
- Competitors: 7 from 7 nations

Medalists
| gold medal | Noriyuki Harada | Japan |
| silver medal | Chang Chang-sun | South Korea |
| bronze medal | Malwa Singh | India |

The men's freestyle 52 kilograms (flyweight) freestyle wrestling competition at the 1962 Asian Games in Jakarta was held from 28 to 30 August 1962.

The competition used a form of negative points tournament, with negative points given for any result short of a fall. Accumulation of 6 negative points eliminated the wrestler. When three or fewer wrestlers remained, they advanced to a final round, with only preliminary results amongst them carried forward.

== Schedule ==
All times are Western Indonesian Time (UTC+07:30)

| Date | Time | Event |
|---|---|---|
| Tuesday, 28 August 1962 | 08:00 | 1st round |
| Wednesday, 29 August 1962 | 08:00 | 2nd round |
| Wednesday, 29 August 1962 | 14:30 | 3rd round |
| Thursday, 30 August 1962 | 08:00 | 4th round |

== Results ==
=== 1st round ===
| TBM | | BM | | BM | | TBM |
|---|---|---|---|---|---|---|
| 1 | Faiz Mohammad Khaksar (AFG) | 1 | Decision | 3 | Agustin Traya (PHI) | 3 |
| 4 | Hassan Muhammad (PAK) | 4 | Fall 4:02 | 0 | Noriyuki Harada (JPN) | 0 |
| 1 | Chang Chang-sun (KOR) | 1 | Decision | 3 | Malwa Singh (IND) | 3 |
| 0 | Bambang Kantong (INA) | | | | Bye | |

=== 2nd round ===
| TBM | | BM | | BM | | TBM |
|---|---|---|---|---|---|---|
| 3 | Bambang Kantong (INA) | 3 | Decision | 1 | Faiz Mohammad Khaksar (AFG) | 2 |
| 4 | Agustin Traya (PHI) | 1 | Decision | 3 | Hassan Muhammad (PAK) | 7 |
| 1 | Noriyuki Harada (JPN) | 1 | Decision | 3 | Chang Chang-sun (KOR) | 4 |
| 3 | Malwa Singh (IND) | | | | Bye | |

=== 3rd round ===
| TBM | | BM | | BM | | TBM |
|---|---|---|---|---|---|---|
| 4 | Malwa Singh (IND) | 1 | Decision | 3 | Bambang Kantong (INA) | 6 |
| 5 | Faiz Mohammad Khaksar (AFG) | 3 | Decision | 1 | Noriyuki Harada (JPN) | 2 |
| 7 | Agustin Traya (PHI) | 3 | Decision | 1 | Chang Chang-sun (KOR) | 5 |

=== 4th round ===
| TBM | | BM | | BM | | TBM |
|---|---|---|---|---|---|---|
| 7 | Malwa Singh (IND) | 3 | Decision | 1 | Noriyuki Harada (JPN) | 3 |
| 8 | Faiz Mohammad Khaksar (AFG) | 3 | Decision | 1 | Chang Chang-sun (KOR) | 6 |

== Final standing ==
| Rank | Athlete | Round | | | | TBM | FBM |
| Rank | Athlete | 1 | 2 | 3 | 4 | TBM | FBM |
|---|---|---|---|---|---|---|---|
| 1st place, gold medalist(s) | Noriyuki Harada (JPN) | 0 | 1 | 1 | 1 | 3 | 0 |
| 2nd place, silver medalist(s) | Chang Chang-sun (KOR) | 1 | 3 | 1 | 1 | 6 | |
| 3rd place, bronze medalist(s) | Malwa Singh (IND) | 3 | Bye | 1 | 3 | 7 | |
| 4 | Faiz Mohammad Khaksar (AFG) | 1 | 1 | 3 | 3 | 8 | |
| 5 | Bambang Kantong (INA) | Bye | 3 | 3 | | 6 | |
| 6 | Agustin Traya (PHI) | 3 | 1 | 3 | | 7 | |
| 7 | Hassan Muhammad (PAK) | 4 | 3 | | | 7 | |
