= Wrestling at the 1962 Asian Games – Men's Greco-Roman 78 kg =

Men's Greco-Roman 78 kg at the 1962 Asian Games
- Venue: Ikada Sports Hall
- Dates: 25–27 August 1962
- Competitors: 5 from 5 nations

Medalists
gold medal	Yutaka Kaneko	Japan
silver medal	Muhammad Bashir	Pakistan
bronze medal	Oh Jae-young	South Korea

The men's Greco-Roman 78 kilograms (welterweight) Greco-Roman wrestling competition at the 1962 Asian Games in Jakarta was held from 25 to 27 August 1962.

The competition used a form of negative points tournament, with negative points given for any result short of a fall. Accumulation of 6 negative points eliminated the wrestler. When three or fewer wrestlers remained, they advanced to a final round, with only preliminary results amongst them carried forward.

== Schedule ==
All times are Western Indonesian Time (UTC+07:30)

Date	Time	Event
Saturday, 25 August 1962	08:00	1st round
Sunday, 26 August 1962	08:00	2nd round
Monday, 27 August 1962	08:00	3rd round
Monday, 27 August 1962	14:30	4th round

== Results ==
=== 1st round ===
TBM		BM		BM		TBM
3	Oh Jae-young (KOR)	3	Decision	1	Yutaka Kaneko (JPN)	1
0	Muhammad Bashir (PAK)	0	Fall 6:03	4	Bobby Harry Sutopo (INA)	4
0	Lakshmikant Pandey (IND)				Bye	

=== 2nd round ===
TBM		BM		BM		TBM
3	Lakshmikant Pandey (IND)	3	Decision	1	Oh Jae-young (KOR)	4
3	Yutaka Kaneko (JPN)	2	Draw	2	Muhammad Bashir (PAK)	2
4	Bobby Harry Sutopo (INA)				Bye	

=== 3rd round ===
TBM		BM		BM		TBM
7	Bobby Harry Sutopo (INA)	3	Decision	1	Oh Jae-young (KOR)	5
7	Lakshmikant Pandey (IND)	4	Fall 9:45	0	Yutaka Kaneko (JPN)	3
2	Muhammad Bashir (PAK)				Bye	

=== 4th round ===
TBM		BM		BM		TBM
4	Muhammad Bashir (PAK)	2	Draw	2	Oh Jae-young (KOR)	7
3	Yutaka Kaneko (JPN)				Bye	

== Final standing ==
Rank	Athlete	Round				TBM	FBM
Rank	Athlete	1	2	3	4	TBM	FBM
1st place, gold medalist(s)	Yutaka Kaneko (JPN)	1	2	0	Bye	3	3
2nd place, silver medalist(s)	Muhammad Bashir (PAK)	0	2	Bye	2	4	4
3rd place, bronze medalist(s)	Oh Jae-young (KOR)	3	1	1	2	7	5
4	Lakshmikant Pandey (IND)	Bye	3	4		7	
5	Bobby Harry Sutopo (INA)	4	Bye	3		7	
