= Wrestling at the 1962 Asian Games – Men's freestyle +97 kg =

Men's freestyle +97 kg at the 1962 Asian Games
- Venue: Ikada Sports Hall
- Dates: 28–30 August 1962
- Competitors: 5 from 5 nations

Medalists
gold medal	Muhammad Saeed	Pakistan
silver medal	Ganpat Andalkar	India
bronze medal	Jiro Seki	Japan

The men's freestyle +97 kilograms (heavyweight) freestyle wrestling competition at the 1962 Asian Games in Jakarta was held from 28 to 30 August 1962.

The competition used a form of negative points tournament, with negative points given for any result short of a fall. Accumulation of 6 negative points eliminated the wrestler. When three or fewer wrestlers remained, they advanced to a final round, with only preliminary results amongst them carried forward.

== Schedule ==
All times are Western Indonesian Time (UTC+07:30)

Date	Time	Event
Tuesday, 28 August 1962	08:00	1st round
Wednesday, 29 August 1962	08:00	2nd round
Wednesday, 29 August 1962	14:30	3rd round
Thursday, 30 August 1962	08:00	4th round

== Results ==
=== 1st round ===
TBM		BM		BM		TBM
1	Ganpat Andalkar (IND)	1	Decision	3	Nizamuddin Subhani (AFG)	3
1	Muhammad Saeed (PAK)	1	Decision	3	Jiro Seki (JPN)	3
0	Poniman Soeharto (INA)				Bye	

=== 2nd round ===
TBM		BM		BM		TBM
4	Poniman Soeharto (INA)	4	Fall 0:21	0	Ganpat Andalkar (IND)	1
6	Nizamuddin Subhani (AFG)	3	Decision	1	Muhammad Saeed (PAK)	2
3	Jiro Seki (JPN)				Bye	

=== 3rd round ===
TBM		BM		BM		TBM
3	Jiro Seki (JPN)	0	Fall 2:42	4	Poniman Soeharto (INA)	8
3	Ganpat Andalkar (IND)	2	Draw	2	Muhammad Saeed (PAK)	4

=== 4th round ===
TBM		BM		BM		TBM
5	Jiro Seki (JPN)	2	Draw	2	Ganpat Andalkar (IND)	5
4	Muhammad Saeed (PAK)				Bye	

== Final standing ==
Rank	Athlete	Round				TBM	FBM
Rank	Athlete	1	2	3	4	TBM	FBM
1st place, gold medalist(s)	Muhammad Saeed (PAK)	1	1	2	Bye	4	3
2nd place, silver medalist(s)	Ganpat Andalkar (IND)	1	0	2	2	5	4
3rd place, bronze medalist(s)	Jiro Seki (JPN)	3	Bye	0	2	5	5
4	Poniman Soeharto (INA)	Bye	4	4		8	
5	Nizamuddin Subhani (AFG)	3	3			6	
