= Marcucci =

Marcucci is an Italian surname. Notable people with the surname include:

- Antonio Marcucci (born 1937), Italian Olympic wrestler
- Bob Marcucci (1930–2011), American personal manager at Chancellor Records and Robert P. Marcucci Productions
- Domingo Marcucci (1827–1905), Venezuelan-born American shipbuilder
- Venerable Francesco Antonio Marcucci (1717-1798), Italian bishop
- Gian Marco Marcucci (born 1954), served as a Captain Regent of San Marino
- Laura E. Marcucci (born 1971), Italian physicist
- Nancy Marcucci (1952–2018), American breast cancer activist
- Natacha Marcucci (born 1970), Argentine former tennis player
- Tadeo Marcucci (born 2001), Argentine field hockey player
- Valentina Marcucci (born 1998), Argentine field hockey player
