= Muhammad Nazir =

Muhammad Nazir may refer to:

- Muhammad Nazir (wrestler, born 1930), Pakistani heavyweight wrestler
- Muhammad Nazir (wrestler, born 1936), Pakistani featherweight and flyweight wrestler
- Mohammad Nazir, Pakistani cricketer
