= Wrestling at the 1962 Asian Games – Men's Greco-Roman +97 kg =

Men's Greco-Roman +97 kg at the 1962 Asian Games
- Venue: Ikada Sports Hall
- Dates: 25–27 August 1962
- Competitors: 4 from 4 nations

Medalists
gold medal	Ganpat Andalkar	India
silver medal	Muhammad Saeed	Pakistan
bronze medal	Jiro Seki	Japan

The men's Greco-Roman +97 kilograms (heavyweight) Greco-Roman wrestling competition at the 1962 Asian Games in Jakarta was held from 25 to 27 August 1962.

The competition used a form of negative points tournament, with negative points given for any result short of a fall. Accumulation of 6 negative points eliminated the wrestler. When three or fewer wrestlers remained, they advanced to a final round, with only preliminary results amongst them carried forward.

== Schedule ==
All times are Western Indonesian Time (UTC+07:30)

Date	Time	Event
Saturday, 25 August 1962	08:00	1st round
Sunday, 26 August 1962	08:00	2nd round
Monday, 27 August 1962	08:00	3rd round

== Results ==
=== 1st round ===
TBM		BM		BM		TBM
4	Poniman Soeharto (INA)	4	Fall 8:00	0	Jiro Seki (JPN)	0
2	Muhammad Saeed (PAK)	2	Draw	2	Ganpat Andalkar (IND)	2

=== 2nd round ===
TBM		BM		BM		TBM
8	Poniman Soeharto (INA)	4	Fall 2:30	0	Muhammad Saeed (PAK)	2
2	Jiro Seki (JPN)	2	Draw	2	Ganpat Andalkar (IND)	4

=== 3rd round ===
TBM		BM		BM		TBM
4	Muhammad Saeed (PAK)	2	Draw	2	Jiro Seki (JPN)	4
4	Ganpat Andalkar (IND)				Bye	

== Final standing ==
Rank	Athlete	Round			TBM	FBM
Rank	Athlete	1	2	3	TBM	FBM
1st place, gold medalist(s)	Ganpat Andalkar (IND)	2	2	Bye	4	4 (Note: Tied on total bad marks. The athletes' body weights were used as the tiebreaker.)
2nd place, silver medalist(s)	Muhammad Saeed (PAK)	2	0	2	4	4
3rd place, bronze medalist(s)	Jiro Seki (JPN)	0	2	2	4	4
4	Poniman Soeharto (INA)	4	4		8	
