= Wrestling at the 1962 Asian Games – Men's Greco-Roman 87 kg =

Men's Greco-Roman 87 kg at the 1962 Asian Games
- Venue: Ikada Sports Hall
- Dates: 25–27 August 1962
- Competitors: 4 from 4 nations

Medalists
gold medal	Shunichi Kawano	Japan
silver medal	Sajjan Singh	India
bronze medal	Faiz Muhammad	Pakistan

The men's Greco-Roman 87 kilograms (middleweight) Greco-Roman wrestling competition at the 1962 Asian Games in Jakarta was held from 25 to 27 August 1962.

The competition used a form of negative points tournament, with negative points given for any result short of a fall. Accumulation of 6 negative points eliminated the wrestler. When three or fewer wrestlers remained, they advanced to a final round, with only preliminary results amongst them carried forward.

== Schedule ==
All times are Western Indonesian Time (UTC+07:30)

Date	Time	Event
Saturday, 25 August 1962	08:00	1st round
Sunday, 26 August 1962	08:00	2nd round
Monday, 27 August 1962	08:00	3rd round

== Results ==
=== 1st round ===
TBM		BM		BM		TBM
1	Faiz Muhammad (PAK)	1	Decision	3	Soewandi (INA)	3
2	Shunichi Kawano (JPN)	2	Draw	2	Sajjan Singh (IND)	2

=== 2nd round ===
TBM		BM		BM		TBM
3	Faiz Muhammad (PAK)	2	Draw	2	Shunichi Kawano (JPN)	4
7	Soewandi (INA)	4	Fall 7:16	0	Sajjan Singh (IND)	2

=== 3rd round ===
TBM		BM		BM		TBM
5	Faiz Muhammad (PAK)	2	Draw	2	Sajjan Singh (IND)	4
4	Shunichi Kawano (JPN)				Bye	

== Final standing ==
Rank	Athlete	Round			TBM	FBM
Rank	Athlete	1	2	3	TBM	FBM
1st place, gold medalist(s)	Shunichi Kawano (JPN)	2	2	Bye	4	4 (Note: Total bad marks were used as the tiebreaker. Kawano and Singh were ranked by their body weights.)
2nd place, silver medalist(s)	Sajjan Singh (IND)	2	0	2	4	4
3rd place, bronze medalist(s)	Faiz Muhammad (PAK)	1	2	2	5	4
4	Soewandi (INA)	3	4		7	
