= Gordon Mackay =

Gordon Mackay may refer to:

- Gordon Mackay (wrestler), wrestler from New Zealand
- Gordon Mackay (rugby union) (1969–2008), Scottish rugby union player
