= Graham Hamlyn =

British triple jumper

Personal information
- Nationality: British (English)
- Born: Q1. 1947 Thanet, Kent, England

Sport
- Sport: Athletics
- Event: Triple jump
- Club: Blackheath Harriers

Graham Hamlyn (born 1947) is a former international athlete who competed at the Commonwealth Games.

== Biography ==
Hamlyn from Broadstairs, attended Dane Court Grammar School. He was a member of the Blackheath Harriers and specialised in the triple jump and represented England and Great Britain at international level.

Hamlyn finished third at the AAA Championships, behind Șerban Ciochină and Fred Alsop at the 1968 AAA Championships.

Hamlyn represented the England team at the 1970 British Commonwealth Games in Edinburgh, Scotland, where he competed in the triple jump event.
