= Appalachian State Mountaineers wrestling =

- University: Appalachian State University
- Head coach: JohnMark Bentley (14th season)
- Conference: SoCon
- Location: Boone, NC
- Arena: Varsity Gymnasium (capacity: 8,000 (for wrestling))
- Nickname: Mountaineers
- Colors: Black and gold

All-Americans
- 21 (11 NCAA Division I, 10 NAIA)

Conference championships
- 1994, 1997, 1998, 1999, 2001, 2003, 2012, 2016, 2017, 2018, 2019, 2022, 2023, 2025, 2026

Conference Tournament championships
- 1984, 1995, 1996, 1997, 2001, 2003, 2016, 2018, 2023, 2024, 2025, 2026

The Appalachian State Mountaineers wrestling team represents Appalachian State University of Boone, North Carolina. The team head coach is JohnMark Bentley. The Mountaineers are full members of the non-wrestling Sun Belt Conference, with the wrestling team competing as an associate member of the Southern Conference (SoCon).

== History ==
The Mountaineers have won 15 regular season and 12 SoCon tournament championships, the most recent for both in the same year being in 2026. As of 2026, the Appalachian State wrestling team has won 126 individual Southern Conference wrestling titles.

Austin Trotman (2007–2012), a former NCAA All-American for the Mountaineers in 2012, is the school's career wins leader with 129 wins.

The school has had eight wrestlers earn eleven All-American honors at the NCAA Division I Championships and seven wrestlers earn ten All-American honors at the NAIA Championships.

Notable former Appalachian State wrestlers include Olympians Al Crawford (1948), Herb Singerman (1968), Ike Anderson (1988), and Dale Oliver (1988). Former UFC fighter Tony Gravely also wrestled for the Mountaineers.
