= Dieter Rauchbach =

German wrestler

Personal information
- Nationality: German
- Born: 9 April 1934 (age 92) Naumburg, Germany

Sport
- Sport: Wrestling

Dieter Rauchbach (born 9 April 1934) is a German wrestler. He competed in the men's freestyle light heavyweight at the 1960 Summer Olympics. During the 1950s and 1960s, Rauchbach was an eleven-time national champion, and in 1963, he won the "Master of Sports" in East Germany.
