= Alastair McNeill =

British wrestler (born 1929)

Personal information
- Nationality: British (Scottish)
- Born: c.1938 Scotland

Sport
- Sport: Wrestling
- Event: Heavyweight
- Club: Carnegie AWC, Dunfermline

Alastair McNeill also spelt Alistair (born c.1938) is a former Scottish wrestler who competed at two Commonwealth Games.

== Biography ==
McNeill was a brewery worker in Dunfermline and was a member of the Carnegie Amateur Wrestling Club.

He was selected for the 1962 Scottish team for the 1962 British Empire and Commonwealth Games in Perth, Australia, in the middleweight class, and finished in equal fourth place behind the gold medal winner Faiz Muhammad of Pakistan.

McNeill represented the Scottish Commonwealth Games team a second time, at the 1970 British Commonwealth Games in Edinburgh, Scotland, where he competed in the light heavyweight 90kg.

McNeill was a Scottish champion and British title runner-up.
