= Harishchandra Birajdar =

Indian wrestler (1950–2011)

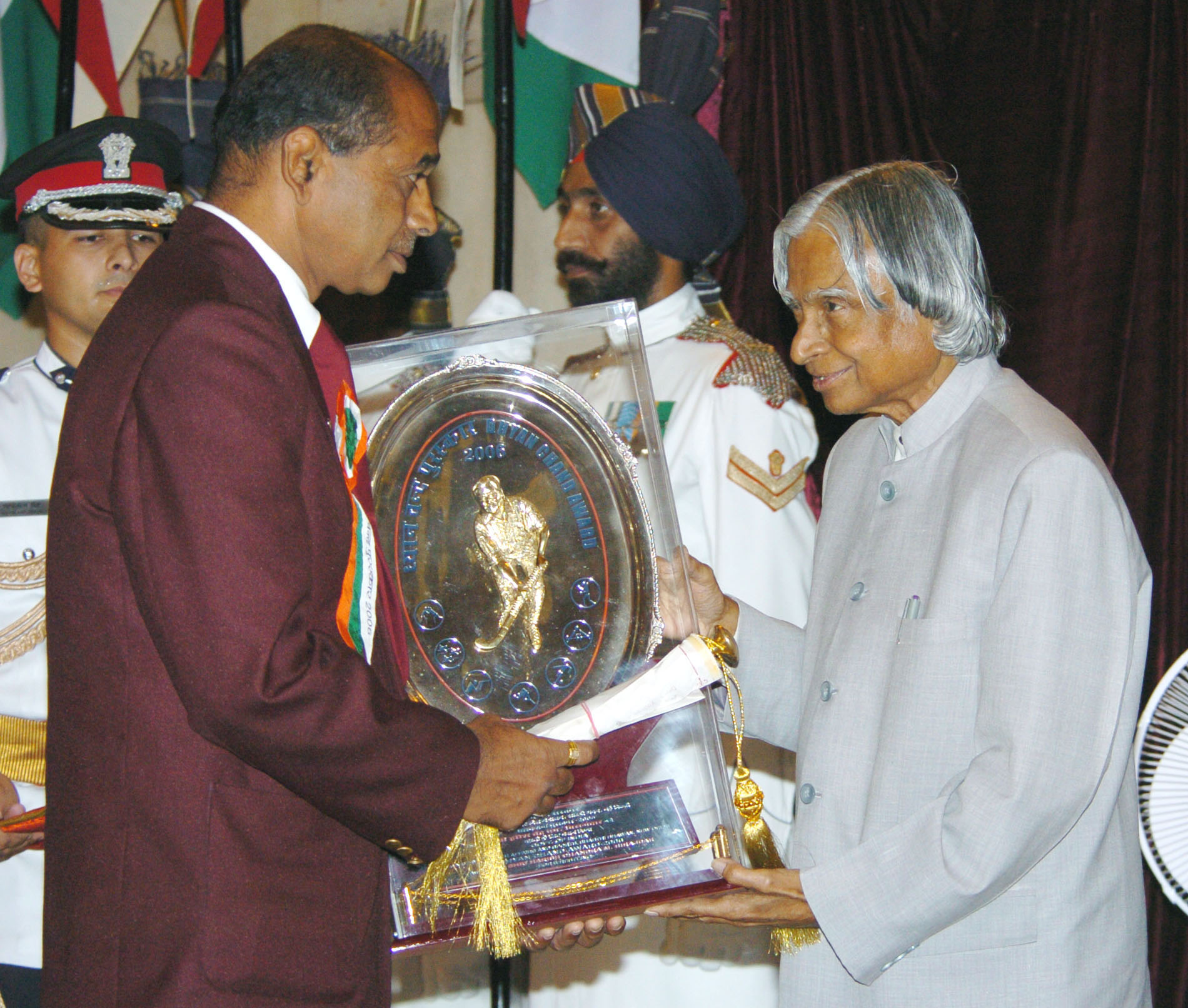

Personal information
- Nationality: Indian
- Born: June 5, 1950 Latur, Maharashtra, India
- Died: September 14, 2011 (aged 61)

Sport
- Sport: Wrestling
Medal record
Wrestling
Representing India
Commonwealth Games
Gold medal – first place	1970 Edinburgh	middleweight 82Kg

Harishchandra Madhavrao Birajdar (Note: Marathi: हरिश्‍चंद्र माधवराव बिराजदार) (June 5, 1950 – September 14, 2011) was a wrestler and wrestling coach from India. He was a Gold Medallist in the 1970 British Commonwealth Games. He was also known as the coach of National Games winners.

== Biography ==
Birajdar was born in Ramling Mudgad Tal in Nilanga in the Latur, district n the state of Maharashtra in India. He was from Lingayat community. He was coached by his father initially and then Ganpatrao Khedkar at Gangaves Talim, Kolhapur. He had defeated well-known wrestler Satpal in a 1977 bout, which brought him into limelight. Birajdar worked as coach in Gokul Vastad Talim in Pune. He was awarded the Dhyanchand Award in 2006 by the Indian Government. Earlier in 1971 he has been awarded the Shivchhatrapati award and then the Dadoji Konddev award for coaching in 1998. Even after having been honoured with so many awards and recognitions, he was a humble human being," said Ganpatrao Khedkar, under whose tutelage Birajdar wrestled from 1965 to 198

== Awards and achievements ==
- 1969: Hind Kesari
- 1971: Shivchhatrapati Award
- 1972: Rustum E Hind
- 1998: Dadoji Konddev Award
- 2006: Dhyanchand Award

== See also ==
- India at the 1970 British Commonwealth Games
- Dhyan Chand Award
