= Anatoly Albul =

Soviet wrestler (1936–2013)

Medal record

Men's freestyle wrestling

Representing the Soviet Union

Olympic Games
Bronze medal – third place	1960 Rome	Light heavyweight

World Championships
Silver medal – second place	1963 Sofia	Middleweight

World Cup
Gold medal – first place	1958 Sofia	Light heavyweight

Anatoly Mikhaylovich Albul (Russian: Анатолий Михайлович Албул; 1 June 1936 – 13 August 2013) was a Russian wrestler. He was born in Leningrad. He was Olympic bronze medalist in Freestyle wrestling in 1960, competing for the Soviet Union. He won a silver medal at the 1963 World Wrestling Championships.

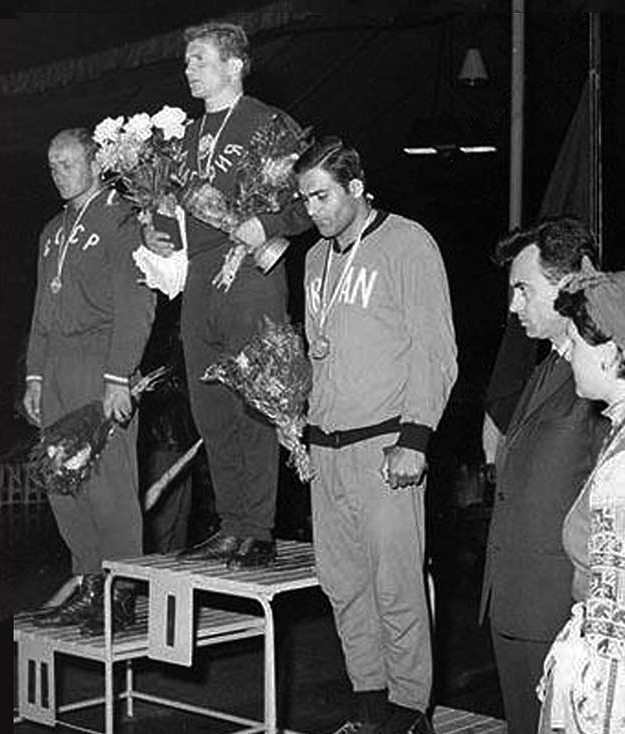
Medal winners of freestyle 87 kg in 1963 World Wrestling Championships. From left to right, Anatoly Albul, Prodan Gardzhev and Mansour Mehdizadeh
