= Wrestling at the 1962 Asian Games – Men's Greco-Roman 63 kg =

Men's Greco-Roman 63 kg at the 1962 Asian Games
- Venue: Ikada Sports Hall
- Dates: 25–27 August 1962
- Competitors: 3 from 3 nations

Medalists
gold medal	Tokuaki Fujita	Japan
silver medal	Muhammad Akhtar	Pakistan
bronze medal	Rachman Firdaus	Indonesia

The men's Greco-Roman 63 kilograms (featherweight) Greco-Roman wrestling competition at the 1962 Asian Games in Jakarta was held from 25 to 27 August 1962.

The competition used a form of negative points tournament, with negative points given for any result short of a fall. Accumulation of 6 negative points eliminated the wrestler. When three or fewer wrestlers remained, they advanced to a final round, with only preliminary results amongst them carried forward.

== Schedule ==
All times are Western Indonesian Time (UTC+07:30)

Date	Time	Event
Saturday, 25 August 1962	08:00	1st round
Sunday, 26 August 1962	08:00	2nd round
Monday, 27 August 1962	08:00	3rd round

== Results ==
=== 1st round ===
TBM		BM		BM		TBM
1	Tokuaki Fujita (JPN)	1	Decision	3	Muhammad Akhtar (PAK)	3
0	Rachman Firdaus (INA)				Bye	

=== 2nd round ===
TBM		BM		BM		TBM
3	Rachman Firdaus (INA)	3	Decision	1	Tokuaki Fujita (JPN)	2
3	Muhammad Akhtar (PAK)				Bye	

=== 3rd round ===
TBM		BM		BM		TBM
4	Muhammad Akhtar (PAK)	1	Decision	3	Rachman Firdaus (INA)	6
2	Tokuaki Fujita (JPN)				Bye	

== Final standing ==
Rank	Athlete	Round			TBM	FBM
Rank	Athlete	1	2	3	TBM	FBM
1st place, gold medalist(s)	Tokuaki Fujita (JPN)	1	1	Bye	2	2
2nd place, silver medalist(s)	Muhammad Akhtar (PAK)	3	Bye	1	4	4
3rd place, bronze medalist(s)	Rachman Firdaus (INA)	Bye	3	3	6	6
