= Wrestling at the 1962 Asian Games – Men's freestyle 63 kg =

Men's freestyle 63 kg at the 1962 Asian Games
- Venue: Ikada Sports Hall
- Dates: 28–30 August 1962
- Competitors: 6 from 6 nations

Medalists
gold medal	Osamu Watanabe	Japan
silver medal	Muhammad Akhtar	Pakistan
bronze medal	Mohammad Ebrahim Khedri	Afghanistan

The men's freestyle 63 kilograms (featherweight) freestyle wrestling competition at the 1962 Asian Games in Jakarta was held from 28 to 30 August 1962.

The competition used a form of negative points tournament, with negative points given for any result short of a fall. Accumulation of 6 negative points eliminated the wrestler. When three or fewer wrestlers remained, they advanced to a final round, with only preliminary results amongst them carried forward.

== Schedule ==
All times are Western Indonesian Time (UTC+07:30)

Date	Time	Event
Tuesday, 28 August 1962	08:00	1st round
Wednesday, 29 August 1962	08:00	2nd round
Wednesday, 29 August 1962	14:30	3rd round
Thursday, 30 August 1962	08:00	4th round

== Results ==
=== 1st round ===
TBM		BM		BM		TBM
3	Muhammad Akhtar (PAK)	3	Decision	1	Osamu Watanabe (JPN)	1
0	Chung Dong-goo (KOR)	0	Fall 8:41	4	Antonio Senosa (PHI)	4
4	Nana Surjana (INA)	4	Fall 4:03	0	Mohammad Ebrahim Khedri (AFG)	0

=== 2nd round ===
TBM		BM		BM		TBM
4	Muhammad Akhtar (PAK)	1	Decision	3	Chung Dong-goo (KOR)	3
1	Osamu Watanabe (JPN)	0	Fall 1:16	4	Nana Surjana (INA)	8
8	Antonio Senosa (PHI)	4	Fall 2:04	0	Mohammad Ebrahim Khedri (AFG)	0

=== 3rd round ===
TBM		BM		BM		TBM
5	Muhammad Akhtar (PAK)	1	Decision	3	Mohammad Ebrahim Khedri (AFG)	3
2	Osamu Watanabe (JPN)	1	Decision	3	Chung Dong-goo (KOR)	6

=== 4th round ===
TBM		BM		BM		TBM
3	Osamu Watanabe (JPN)	1	Decision	3	Mohammad Ebrahim Khedri (AFG)	6
5	Muhammad Akhtar (PAK)				Bye	

== Final standing ==
Rank	Athlete	Round				TBM	FBM
Rank	Athlete	1	2	3	4	TBM	FBM
1st place, gold medalist(s)	Osamu Watanabe (JPN)	1	0	1	1	3	2
2nd place, silver medalist(s)	Muhammad Akhtar (PAK)	3	1	1	Bye	5	4
3rd place, bronze medalist(s)	Mohammad Ebrahim Khedri (AFG)	0	0	3	3	6	6
4	Chung Dong-goo (KOR)	0	3	3		6	
5	Nana Surjana (INA)	4	4			8	
5	Antonio Senosa (PHI)	4	4			8	
