= John Armitt (wrestler) =

New Zealand wrestler (1925–2008)

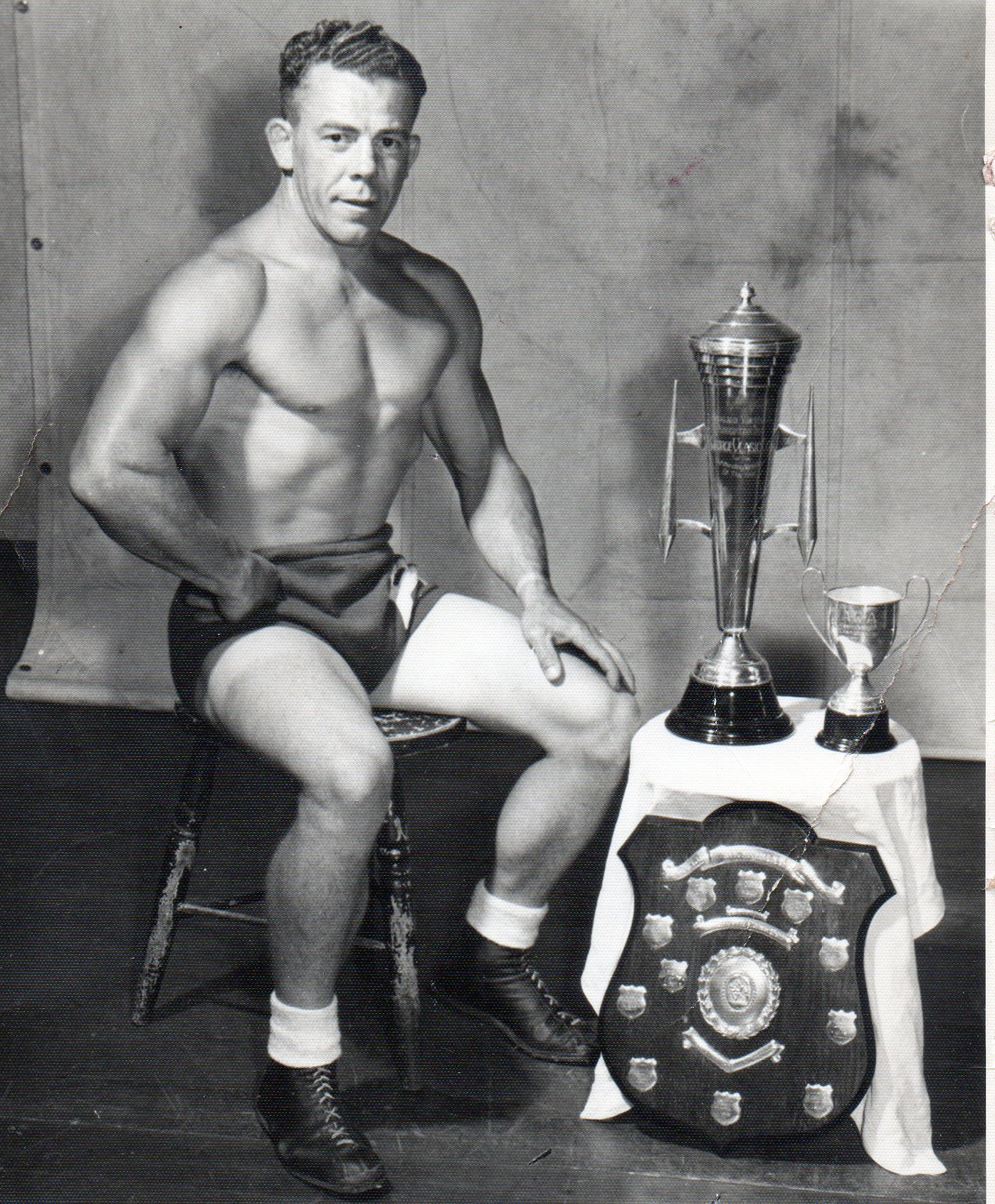

Personal information
- Born: John Charles Armitt; 23 August 1925
- Died: 4 June 2008 (aged 82)
Medal record
Representing New Zealand
Men's wrestling
British Empire and Commonwealth Games
Gold medal – first place	1950 Auckland	62 kg
Bronze medal – third place	1954 Vancouver	62 kg

John Charles Armitt (23 August 1925 – 4 June 2008) was a wrestler from New Zealand.

He competed at the 1950 British Empire Games where he won the gold medal in the men's 62 kg grade. At the next British Empire and Commonwealth Games in Vancouver he won the bronze medal in the same event.
