= Eugen Holzherr =

Swiss wrestler

Personal information
- Nationality: Swiss
- Born: 24 December 1928 Bärschwil, Switzerland
- Died: November 5, 1990 (aged 61)

Sport
- Sport: Wrestling

Eugen Holzherr (24 December 1928 – 5 november 1990) was a Swiss wrestler. He competed in the men's freestyle light heavyweight at the 1960 Summer Olympics.
