= Patrick Parsons =

Australian wrestler

Personal information
- Nationality: Venezuelan
- Born: 22 May 1934 (age 92)

Sport
- Sport: Wrestling

Patrick Parsons (born 22 May 1934) is an Australian wrestler. He competed in the men's freestyle light heavyweight at the 1960 Summer Olympics.
