= Valko Kostov =

Bulgarian wrestler

Personal information
- Nationality: Bulgarian
- Born: 14 November 1936 Haskovo, Bulgaria
- Died: 21 November 2012 (aged 76)

Sport
- Sport: Wrestling
Medal record
Representing Bulgaria
World Championships
Silver medal – second place	1963 Sofia	97 kg

Valko Kostov (14 November 1936 – 21 November 2012) was a Bulgarian wrestler. He competed in the men's freestyle light heavyweight at the 1960 Summer Olympics.
