= César Ferreras =

Venezuelan wrestler (born 1934)

Personal information
- Born: 6 May 1934 (age 92) Upata, Venezuela

Sport
- Sport: Wrestling

César Ferreras (born 6 May 1934) is a Venezuelan wrestler. He competed in the men's freestyle light heavyweight at the 1960 Summer Olympics.
