= Muhammad Akhtar (wrestler) =

Pakistani wrestler (born 1930)

Personal information
- Nationality: Pakistani
- Born: 11 September 1930 Amritsar, India

Sport
- Sport: Wrestling
Medal record
World Championships
| Bronze medal – third place | 1959 Tehran | Featherweight |
Asian Games
| Silver medal – second place | 1958 Tokyo | Freestyle 57 kg |
| Silver medal – second place | 1962 Jakarta | Freestyle 63 kg |
| Silver medal – second place | 1962 Jakarta | Greco-Roman 63 kg |
Commonwealth Games
| Gold medal – first place | 1958 Cardiff | Bantamweight |
| Gold medal – first place | 1962 Perth | Lightweight |
| Gold medal – first place | 1966 Kingston | Featherweight |

Muhammad Akhtar (born 11 September 1930) is a Pakistani wrestler. He competed at the 1960 Summer Olympics and the 1964 Summer Olympics. He won the silver medal in the men's freestyle 63 kg wrestling event at the 1962 Asian Games.
