= Terence Robinson =

English wrestler

Personal information
- Nationality: British (English)
- Born: c. 1948 London, England

Sport
- Sport: Amateur wrestling
Medal record
Men's freestyle wrestling
Representing England
Commonwealth Games
| Bronze medal – third place | 1970 Edinburgh | 57 kg |

Terence "Terry" D. Robinson (born c.1948) was a male wrestler who competed for England.

== Biography ==
Robinson represented England and won a bronze medal, in the bantamweight category of -57 kg, at the 1970 British Commonwealth Games in Edinburgh, Scotland.

Robinson was a two-times winner of the British Wrestling Championships in 1969 and 1970.
