= Ronald Grinstead =

British wrestler (born 1942)

Personal information
- Nationality: British (English)
- Born: 25 December 1942 (age 83) London, England
- Height: 180 cm (5 ft 11 in)
- Weight: 90 kg (198 lb)

Sport
- Sport: Wrestling
- Event: middleweight / light-heavyweight
Medal record
Men's freestyle wrestling
Representing England
British Empire & Commonwealth Games
Bronze medal – third place	1970 Edinburgh	82.5 kg

Ronald Sydney Grinstead (born 25 December 1942) is a retired British international wrestler who competed at the 1968 Summer Olympics and the 1972 Summer Olympics.

== Biography ==
Ron Grinstead made his debut for Great Britain in the 1963 international match against France.

He represented the England team at the 1966 British Empire and Commonwealth Games in Kingston, Jamaica, where he participated in 82 kg middleweight weight category.

At the 1968 Olympic Games in Mexico, he competed in the middleweight division.

Two years later he won a bronze medal in the same event, at the 1970 British Commonwealth Games in Edinburgh, Scotland. He then competed in a third consecutive Games when he appeared at the 1974 British Commonwealth Games, in Christchurch, New Zealand.

In 1972, in between his second and third Commonwealth Games appearances, he competed in a second Olympic Games for Great Britain in Munich.

Grinstead was a four-times winner of the British Wrestling Championships at middleweight in 1962, 1968 and 1970, and in light-heavyweight in 1972.
