= Don Urquhart (wrestler) =

Scottish wrestler

Personal information
- Nationality: British (Scottish)
- Born: Scotland

Sport
- Sport: Amateur wrestling
- Event: Light-flyweight
Medal record
Men's freestyle wrestling
Representing Scotland
Commonwealth Games
Bronze medal – third place	1970 Edinburgh	48 kg

Donald "Don" Urquhart is a former international wrestler from Scotland who competed at the Commonwealth Games and won a bronze medal.

== Biography ==
Urquhart wrestled at light-flyweight.

Urquhart represented the Scotland team at the 1970 British Commonwealth Games in Edinburgh, Scotland, where he participated in 48kg light-flyweight weight category and won a bronze medal.

Urquhart was a three-times winner of the British Wrestling Championships in 1970, 1971 and 1972.
