= Muhammad Bashir =

Pakistani wrestler (1935–2001)

Personal information
- Born: 10 March 1935 Lahore, Punjab Province, British India (now in Pakistan)
- Died: 24 June 2001 (aged 66)
- Height: 1.68 m (5 ft 6 in)
- Weight: 73 kg (161 lb)
Medal record
Men's freestyle wrestling
Representing Pakistan
Event	1st	2nd	3rd
Olympic Games	–	–	1
Commonwealth Games	3	–	–
Asian Games	1	2	1
Total	4	2	2
Olympic Games
Bronze medal – third place	1960 Rome	Welterweight
Commonwealth Games
Gold medal – first place	1958 Cardiff	Welterweight
Gold medal – first place	1962 Perth	Welterweight
Gold medal – first place	1966 Kingston	Welterweight
Asian Games
Gold medal – first place	1966 Bangkok	Welterweight
Silver medal – second place	1962 Jakarta	Welterweight (freestyle)
Silver medal – second place	1962 Jakarta	Welterweight (Greco-Roman style)
Bronze medal – third place	1958 Tokoyo	Welterweight

Mohammad Bashir (Urdu: محمد بشیر) (10 March 1935, in Lahore – 24 June 2001, in Lahore) (Note: this is a different sportsman from Muhammad Bashir (born 1930), a Pakistani weightlifter who competed in the 1956 Summer Olympics.) was a wrestler from Pakistan. He won the bronze medal in freestyle wrestling in the welterweight class (73 kg) at the 1960 Rome Olympics. This was Pakistan's first-ever individual Olympic medal. Bashir remains the only Pakistani wrestler to win an Olympic medal.

== Career ==
Bashir was a three-time gold medalist at the Commonwealth Games. He also won four medals in the Asian Games, including a gold at 1966 Bangkok, two silver medals at 1962 Jakarta, one in freestyle and the other in Greco-Roman style, in addition to a bronze medal in 1958 Tokyo.

His Commonwealth Games gold medals were earned at the 1958 Cardiff, 1962 Perth and 1966 Kingston Games.

At the 1964 Summer Olympics in Tokyo, Mohammad Bashir competed in the lightweight class (70 kg) but only went up to the third round.

== Awards and recognition ==
Ribbon	Decoration	Country	Year
	Tamgha-e-Imtiaz	Pakistan	1962
	Pride of Performance	Pakistan	1968

Mohammad Bashir received the Tamgha-e-Imtiaz medal in 1962 and the Pride of Performance Award in 1968 from the Government of Pakistan.

== Olympic results ==
=== 1960 Rome Summer Olympics ===
Men's welterweight (73 kg)

- 1st round; Beat Peter Amey (GRB) by fall
- 2nd round; Beat Juan Rolon (ARG) on pts
- 3rd round; Lost to Emam-Ali Habibi (IRN) on pts
- 4th round; Beat Karl Bruggmann (SWI) by fall
- 5th round; Beat Gaetano De Vescovi (ITA) on pts
- Final round bout 1; Lost to İsmail Ogan (TUR) on pts
- Final round bout 3; Lost to Douglas Blubaugh (USA) by fall

Mohammad Bashir won the bronze medal after being ranked 3rd out of 23

=== 1964 Tokyo Summer Olympics ===
Men's lightweight (70 kg)

- 1st round; Beat Stefanos Ioannidis (GRE)
- 2nd round; Lost to Zarbegi Beriashvili (USSR)
- 3rd round; Lost to Mahmut Atalay (TUR) by fall

== See also ==
- Pakistan at the Olympics
- Wrestling in Pakistan
