= Antonio Marcucci =

Italian wrestler

Personal information
- Nationality: Italian
- Born: 7 November 1937 (age 88) Faenza, Italy

Sport
- Sport: Wrestling

Antonio Marcucci (born 7 November 1937) is an Italian former wrestler. He competed in the men's freestyle light heavyweight at the 1960 Summer Olympics.
