= Manie van Zyl =

South African wrestler (1929–2012)

Personal information
- Nationality: South African
- Born: 21 January 1929 Modimolle, Limpopo, South Africa
- Died: 5 August 2012 (aged 83) Vaalwater, Limpopo, South Africa

Sport
- Sport: Wrestling

Hermanus Johannes Pienaar van Zyl (21 January 1929 – 5 August 2012) was a South African wrestler. He competed at the 1956 Summer Olympics and the 1960 Summer Olympics. He was the flag bearer for South Africa in the opening ceremony of the 1960 Summer Olympics.
