= Denis McNamara =

British wrestler (1926–2009)

Personal information
- Nationality: British (English)
- Born: 25 August 1926 Camberwell, London, England
- Died: 19 November 2009 (aged 83)
- Height: 185 cm (6 ft 1 in)
- Weight: 103 kg (227 lb)

Sport
- Sport: Wrestling
- Event: Heavyweight
Medal record
Men's freestyle wrestling
Representing England
British Empire & Commonwealth Games
Bronze medal – third place	1962 Perth	100 kg
Bronze medal – third place	1966 Kingston	100 kg
Bronze medal – third place	1970 Edinburgh	100 kg

Denis McNamara (25 August 1926 – 19 November 2009) was a British wrestler. He competed in the men's freestyle heavyweight at the 1964 Summer Olympics.

== Biography ==
McNamara was a policeman by profession and represented England and won a bronze medal in 100 kg heavyweight, at the 1962 British Empire and Commonwealth Games in Perth, Western Australia. He then competed at the next two Commonwealth Games and won consecutive bronze medals at the 1966 British Empire and Commonwealth Games in Kingston, Jamaica and the 1970 British Commonwealth Games in Edinburgh, Scotland.

McNamara won six British super heavyweight titles at the British Wrestling Championships in total (1962, 1963, 1967, 1968, 1970 and 1972).
