= Herbert Singerman =

Canadian wrestler (born 1946)

Personal information
- Born: 23 April 1946 (age 80) Montreal, Quebec, Canada

Sport
- Country: Canada
- Sport: Wrestling
- Events: Freestyle, Greco-Roman and Folkstyle
- College team: Appalachian State
Medal record
Men's freestyle wrestling
Representing Canada
Commonwealth Games
Silver medal – second place	1970 Edinburgh	57 kg

Herbert "Herb" Singerman (born 23 April 1946) is a Canadian former wrestler. He competed in both freestyle and Greco-Roman styles at the 1968 Summer Olympics.

Singerman wrestled collegiately at Appalachian State in Boone, North Carolina, where he was an NAIA wrestling All-American and NCAA wrestling championships national qualifier. In 2023, he was inducted into the Appalachian State Athletics Hall of Fame.
