= Claude Pilon =

Canadian football player and wrestler

Personal information
- Born: June 13, 1950 (age 76)
- Height: 6 ft 4 in (193 cm)
- Weight: 265 lb (120 kg)

Sport
- Sport: Wrestling
- College team: University of Ottawa
Medal record
Men's freestyle wrestling
Representing Canada
British Commonwealth Games
Gold medal – first place	1974 Christchurch	Heavyweight
Bronze medal – third place	1970 Edinburgh	Light heavyweight
Pan American Games
Bronze medal – third place	1975 Mexico City	100 kg

Claude Pilon (born June 13, 1950) is a former Canadian football player and wrestler.

Pilon was raised in Ottawa, Ontario, attending St. Patrick's High School. He began wrestling in grade ten under high school coach Father Cassidy and won three CIAU titles while at the University of Ottawa, where he had to train on his own as there was no varsity wrestling team. A five national champion, Pilon was the heavyweight gold medallist at the 1974 British Commonwealth Games in Christchurch and won a bronze medal at the 1975 Pan American Games.

Pilon, a defensive end, played football for Ottawa Sooners after high school and made a return to the sport in 1977 when he was signed by the Ottawa Rough Riders. He played 12 games in the 1977 CFL season.
