= Patrick Onyango Sumba =

Patrick Onyango Sumba (July 22, 1948 - October 12, 2009) was a Kenyan triple jumper and journalist who competed for Kenya at the 1972 Summer Olympics in Munich in the triple jump event.

== Career ==
Onyango attended the University of Wisconsin-Madison, brought via a program organized by then-Governor Warren Knowles. He was the first Kenyan to compete for the Wisconsin track team, recruited by athlete Mark Winzenried who was visiting Kenya. He was an All-American jumper for the Wisconsin Badgers track and field team, finishing 5th in the triple jump at the 1971 NCAA Indoor Track and Field Championships. When he began jumping at Wisconsin, the Camp Randall Memorial Park jumping pit had to be extended by four feet to accommodate his marks. He was a talented sprinter as well, running on Wisconsin's mile relay team.

Onyango won multiple consecutive Big Ten Conference indoor and outdoor championships in the triple jump, leading to comparisons with Jesse Owens. He was also inducted into the Wisconsin Badgers Hall of Fame in 1971.

== Personal life ==
Onyango is from Nairobi, Kenya. Originally named Onyango meaning "morning sun", he was given the name Patrick by Irish missionaries, who raised him as a child and baptized him. He planned to major in diplomatic international relations.
