= David Idle =

English wrestler

Personal information
- Nationality: British (English)
- Born: 1947 Leeds, England

Sport
- Sport: Amateur wrestling
- Event: Lightweight

David Idle (born 1947) is a former male wrestler from England who competed at the Commonwealth Games.

== Biography ==
Idle, from Leeds, was a plumber by profession He was the 1970 English wrestling champion and Commonwealth trials winner and had a significant rivalry with Joe Kelliher, who beat him at the British Wrestling Championships for the lightweight category title the same year.

Idle represented the England team at the 1970 British Commonwealth Games in Edinburgh, Scotland, where he participated in the lightweight 68kg division, finishing just outside the medal rostrum in fourth place.

In 1974, he was wrestling for Huddersfield Sports Centre and helped them reach the BBC Television's Sports Town 75 competition.
