= Mohammad Asif Kohkan =

Afghan wrestler (born 1936)

Mohammad Asif Kohkan (born 10 June 1936 in Kabul) is a former wrestler from Afghanistan, who competed at the 1960 Summer Olympics in the middleweight freestyle event.
