= Ghulam Mohiddin Gunga =

Afghan wrestler

Ghulam Mohiddin Gunga (born 20 June 1934, in Kabul) is a former Afghanistan wrestler, who competed at the 1960 Summer Olympics in the light-heavyweight freestyle event.
