= Nizamuddin Subhani =

Afghan wrestler

Nizamuddin Subhani (born 10 November 1925) is an Afghan wrestler, who competed at the 1960 Summer Olympics in the heavyweight freestyle event. Subhani was born in Kabul.
