= Mukhtiar Singh =

Indian wrestler (1943–2019)

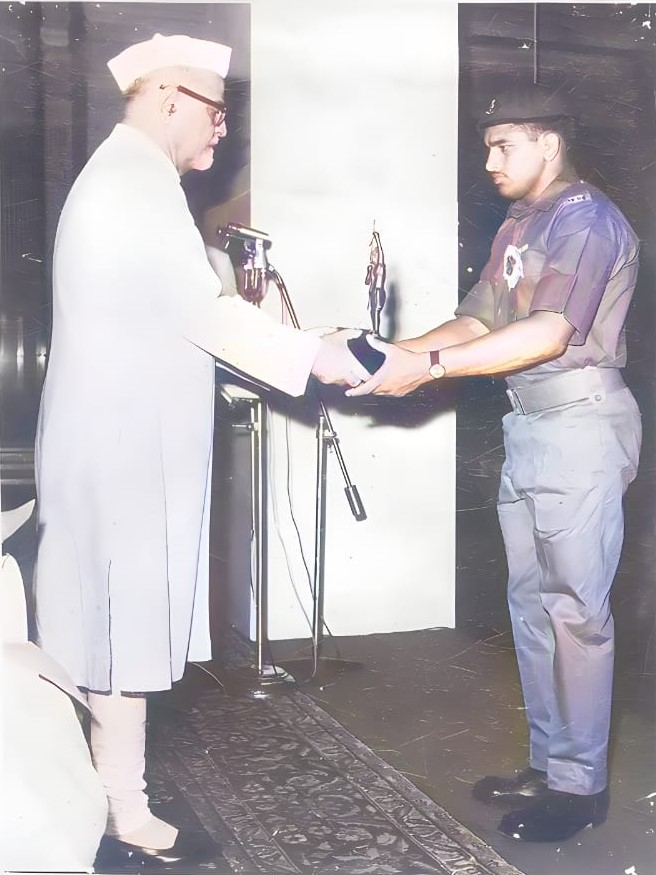
- Singh receiving Arjun Award from President Dr. Zakhir Hussain, 1967

Personal information
- Nicknames: Mukhiya Pahalwan, Jatmal
- Nationality: Indian
- Born: 25 October 1943 Baltikari, Mathura, Uttar Pradesh
- Died: 19 November 2019 (aged 76) 105 Saket Puri Maholi Road Mathura, India
- Height: 172 cm (5 ft 8 in)
- Spouse: Surja Devi
- Children: Brij Mohan Singh(NIS Coach); Geeta Singh; Ravindra Chaudhary
- Military career
- Allegiance: India
- Branch: Indian Army
- Service years: 1963–1988
- Rank: Honorary Captain

Sport
- Country: India
- Sport: Wrestling
Medal record
Representing India
Men's Freestyle Wrestling
Asian Games
Bronze medal – third place	1974 Tehran	82 kg
Commonwealth Games
Gold medal – first place	1966 Kingston, Jamaica	70 Kg
Gold medal – first place	1970 Edinburgh, Scotland	74 Kg
International events
Gold medal – first place	1964 Indo-Iran Wrestling Meet, Tehran
Gold medal – first place	1964 Indo-Newzealand Meet, Newzealand
Gold medal – first place	1964 Indo-Iran Wrestling Meet, Tehran
Gold medal – first place	1965 Indo-American Meet, Mexico
Gold medal – first place	1966 Indo-England Meet, England
Gold medal – first place	1967 Jasan Meet, Kabul Afghanistan
Gold medal – first place	1972 Indo-Soviet Meet, Moscow Russia
Gold medal – first place	1972 Indo-Russian Meet, New Delhi
Gold medal – first place	1976 Indo-Soviet Meet, New Delhi
Gold medal – first place	1976 Indo-Pak Meet, New Delhi

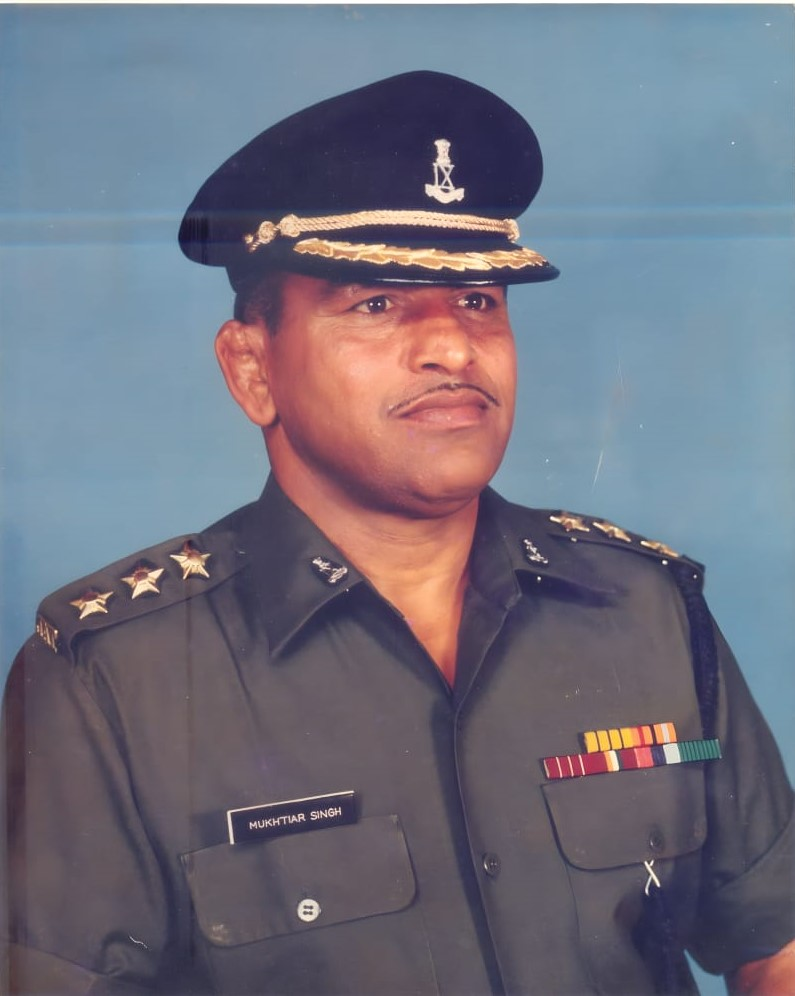
Captain Mukhtiar Singh

Captain Mukhtiar Singh (25 October 1943 – 19 November 2019), popularly known as Mukhiya, was an Indian wrestler. He was the first one to grab two gold medals for India in Commonwealth Games and also he won a bronze medal in the 1970 Asian Games. He served Indian Army for 26 years and retired as Hon. Captain in 1988. Indian Army honored him with Vishisht Seva Medal (VSM) for his outstanding services. He was awarded Arjun Award, the second-highest sporting honour of India, in 1967.

== Biography ==
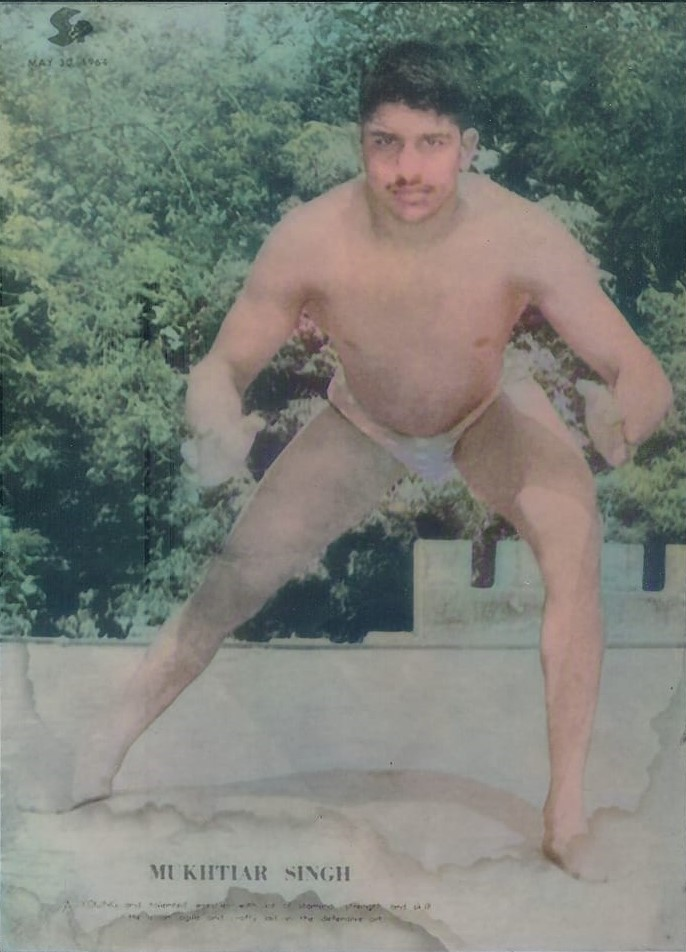
The Daring Grappler

Mukhtiar Singh was born on 25 October 1943 in village Baltikari, Raya, he belongs to a jat family Mathura, Uttar Pradesh. He was popularly known as Mukhiya Pahalwan. His father Ninua Singh was a farmer while his mother Parmali Devi was a housewife. Singh grew up with five brothers. At the age of 12 he had a good hold on his sport and was known by people of nearby districts. After gaining some potential he started practicing under the guidance of his uncle Amichand Pahalwan. He was enrolled in 2nd Jat Regiment, Indian Army in 1963. Later he participated in Services wrestling in the lightweight class and became the champion of Eastern Command on his very first appearance. But he was firstly recognized in the Indian Army when he fought against international wrestler of Indian Army Pahalwan Uday Chand during services tournament. He was awarded with gold medal in the lightweight in the Services championship in 1965. He stood first in 1966 in his weight class. He was accordingly selected to represent India in the British Empire and Commonwealth Games at Kingston, Jamaica in 1966. He won a gold medal defeating all wrestlers in his class there, including the famous Pakistani wrestler M. Hussain and Greig of New Zealand. He was obstructed by a knee injury from taking part in the Vth Asian games at Bangkok in 1966.

Singh was promoted to naib subedar on 15 October 1974, and to subedar on 1 June 1980. Promoted to subedar-major on 1 April 1986, he received a promotion to honorary captain in the 1988 Independence Day promotions list.

== Achievements and participation ==
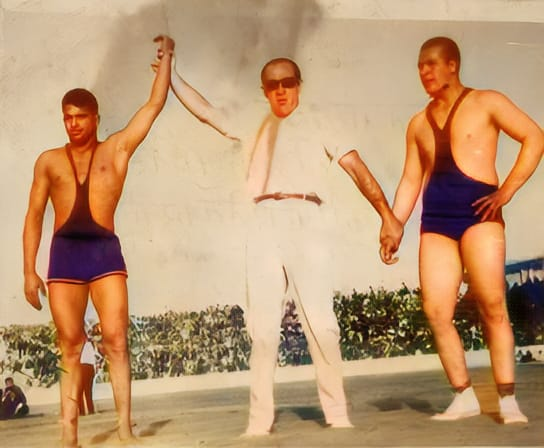
Mukhtiar Singh (left) in Kabul, Afghanistan

- Olympic games
  - 1968: Mexico Olympic
  - 1972: Munich Olympic
- World Wrestling Championship
  - 1967: Delhi [India]
  - 1970: Edmonton [Canada]
- Asian Games
  - 1970: Bangkok, Thailand [Bronze Medal]
  - 1974: Theran, Iran
- Commonwealth games
  - 1966: Kingston, Jamaica [Gold Medal]
  - 1970: Edinburgh, Scotland [Gold Medal]
- Hind Kesari
  - 1964: Karnal, Haryana
- Other international tournaments
  - 1964: Indo-Iran Wrestling Championship, Tehran [Gold Medal]
  - 1964: Indo-Newzealand Wrestling Championship, Newzealand [Gold Medal]
  - 1965: Indo-Iran Wrestling Championship, New Delhi [Gold Medal]
  - 1965: Indo-American Wrestling Championship, Mexico [Gold Medal]
  - 1966: Indo-England Wrestling Championship, England [Gold Medal]
  - 1967: Jasan Meet Wrestling Championship, Kabul Afghanistan [Gold Medal]
  - 1972: Indo-Soviet Wrestling Championship, Moscow Russia [Gold Medal]
  - 1972: Indo-Russian Wrestling Meet, New Delhi [Gold Medal]
  - 1976: Indo-Soviet Wrestling Meet, New Delhi [Gold Medal]
  - 1976: Indo-Pak Wrestling Meet, New Delhi [Gold Medal]

== Awards ==
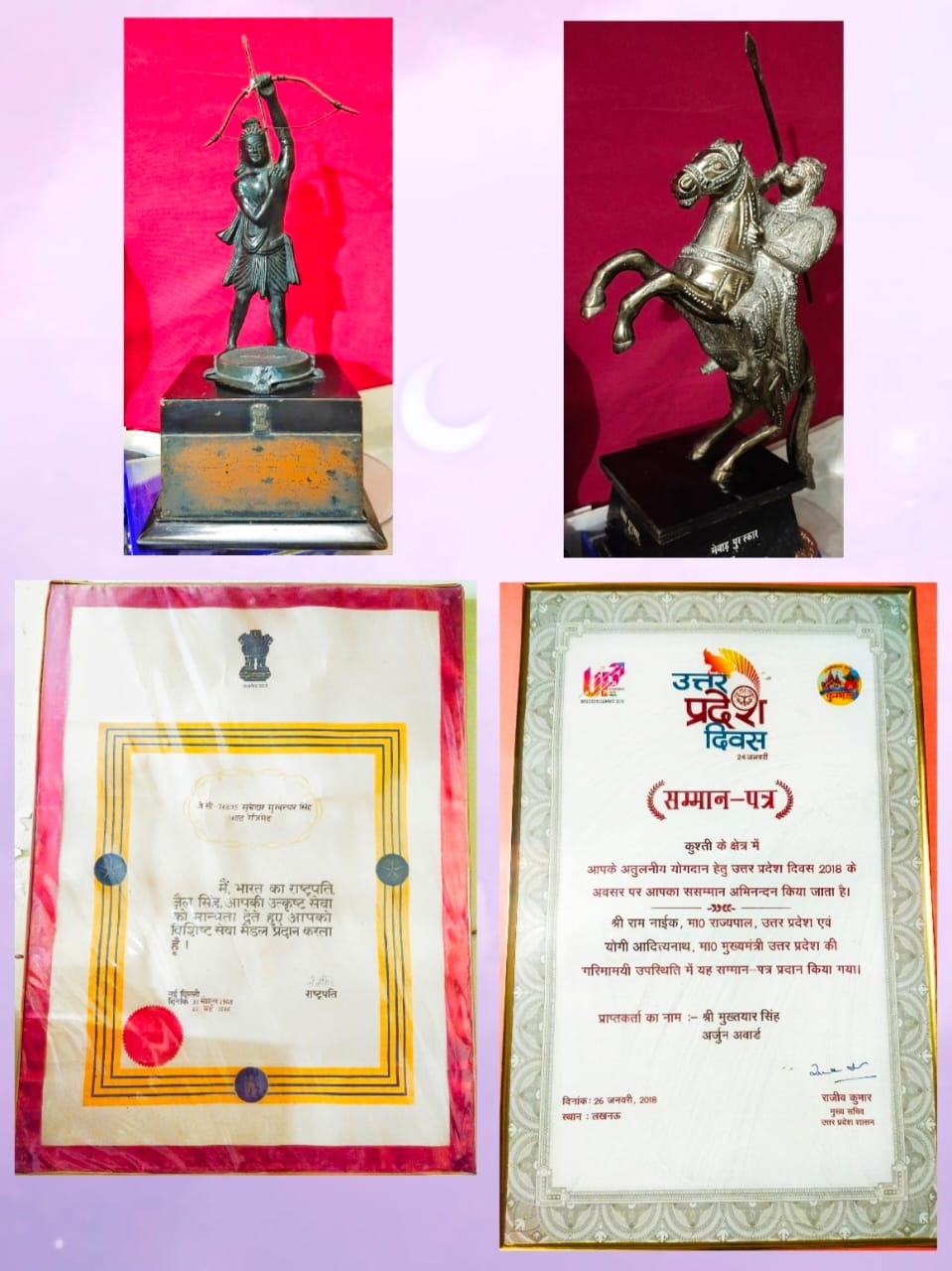
Awards

- 1967― Arjun Award
- 1992― Mewar Award
- 1986― Vishisht Seva Medal (VSM)
- 2018― Hon. Sportsperson Award (By C.M Yogi Adityanath)
- 1996― N.I.S (National Inst. Of Sports, Patiala Punjab)

== Judge, coach and referee ==
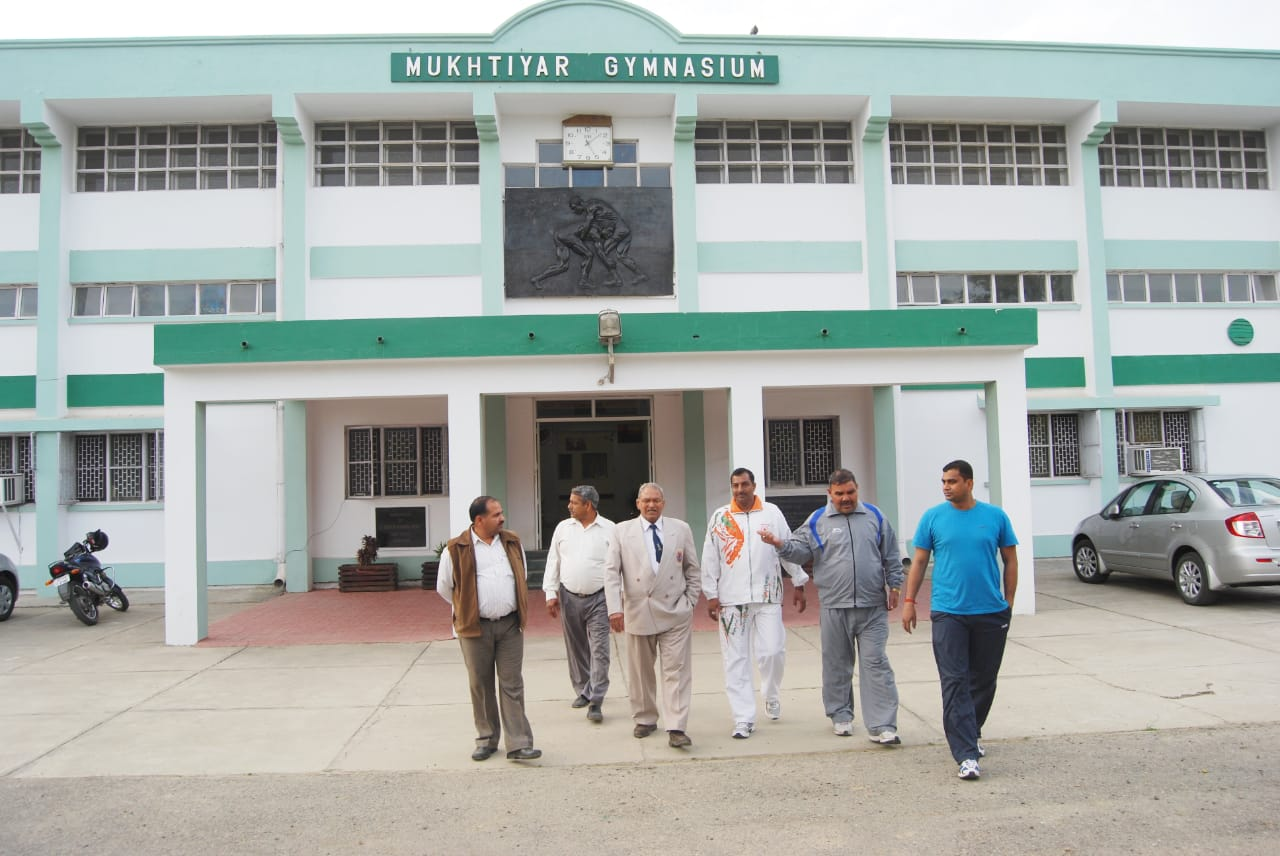
Captain Mukhtiar Singh Gymnasium in Indian Army Jat Regiment Centre, Barielly

- 1991: World Wrestling Championship, Varna, Bulgaria
- 1996: Asian Wrestling Championship, New Delhi
- 1997: World Cadet Wrestling Championship, New Delhi
- 1998: Takhati Cup Wrestling Championship, Iran

== Death ==
Mukhtiar Singh was struck with Alzheimer's disease and he died on 19 November 2019.

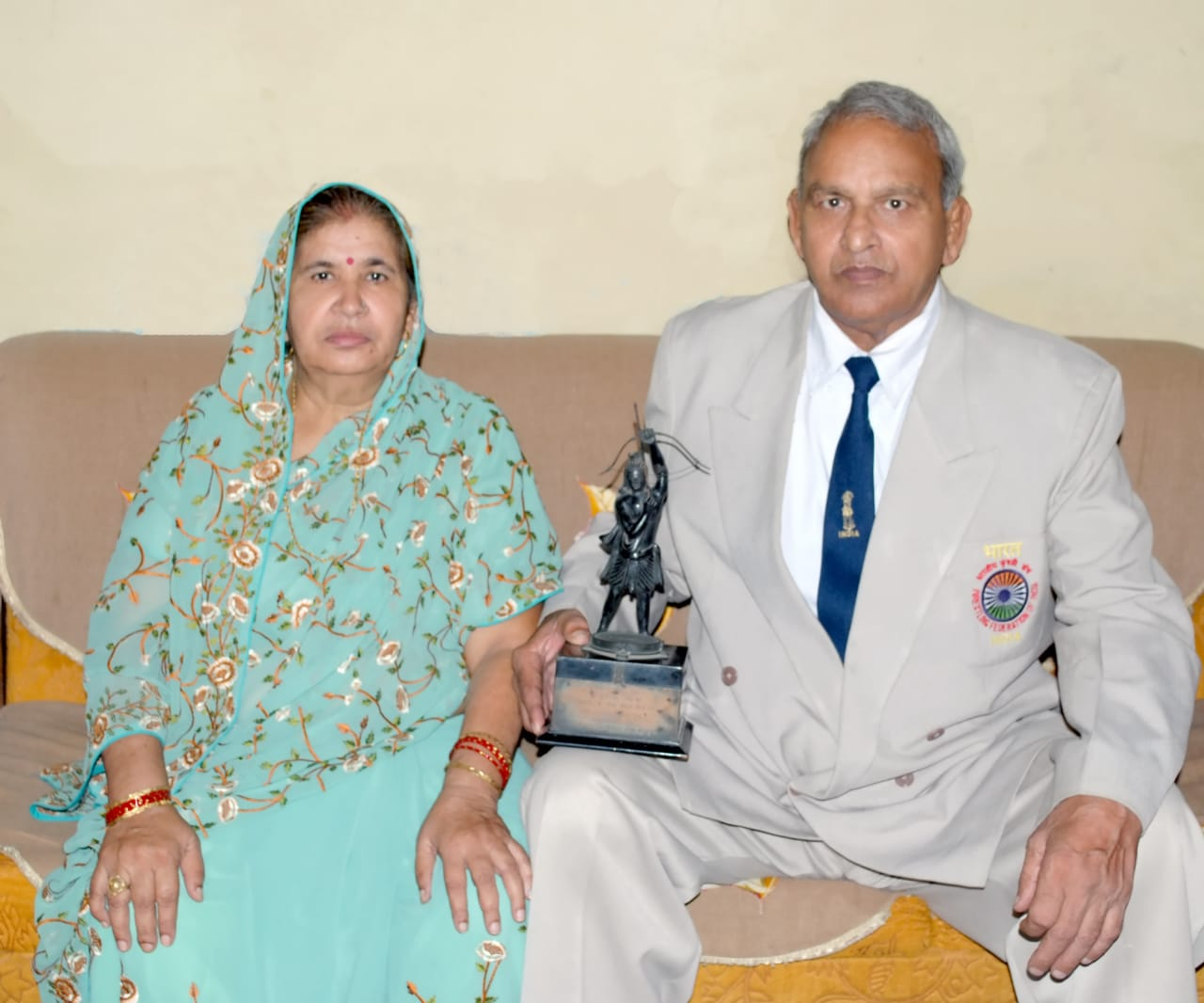
Capt. Mukhtiar Singh with his wife Surja Devi
