= Labh Singh Sitara =

Indian athlete and Indian Army brigadier (born 1939)

Brigadier (Retd.) Labh Singh Sitara
- Brig. Labh Singh Sitara (Retd.)

Personal information
- Full name: Labh Singh Sitara
- Nickname: Labh
- Nationality: Indian
- Born: 25 April 1939 (age 87) Sandhaur, Sangrur district, Punjab, India
- Occupation: Athlete
- Employers: Retired; formerly of the Indian Army
- Height: 5 ft 9 in (1.75 m)
- Weight: 69 kg (152 lb)
- Spouse: Subinder Jit Kaur Kehal
- Military career
- Allegiance: India
- Branch: Indian Army
- Service years: 1962–1992
- Rank: Brigadier
- Units: 1st Battalion, Jat Regiment; 2nd Battalion, Mechanised Infantry Regiment
- Commands: 2nd Battalion, Mechanised Infantry Regiment (1981–1983)
- Awards: Dhyan Chand Award (2004)

Sport
- Country: India
- Sport: Athletics
- Events: Triple jump, long jump

Achievements and titles
- Personal best: Triple jump – 16.04 m (1968)
Medal record
Men's athletics
Representing India
Asian Games
| Bronze medal – third place | 1966 Bangkok | Triple jump |
| Silver medal – second place | 1970 Bangkok | Triple jump |
| Bronze medal – third place | 1970 Bangkok | Long jump |

Brigadier Labh Singh Sitara (born 25 April 1939), recorded in international sport as Labh Singh, is a retired Indian Army officer and former athlete. A triple jumper and long jumper, he competed at the 1964 Summer Olympics and won three medals at the Asian Games. He was a national record holder in the triple jump, and is the only Indian track and field Olympian to have retired from the Indian Army as a brigadier. In 2004, he received the Dhyan Chand Award for lifetime achievement in sports.

== Early life and education ==
In uniform as a Brigadier, 1991

Singh was born in Sandhaur village, in the Sangrur district of Punjab, to Bakshish Singh Kehal and Bhagwant Kaur Kehal. He completed his schooling up to Class 12 at Malerkotla, and graduated from the Lakshmibai College of Physical Education, Gwalior (now the Lakshmibai National Institute of Physical Education).

== Athletic career ==
With fellow Indian athlete Milkha Singh

Singh represented India in the men's triple jump at the 1964 Summer Olympics in Tokyo, recording 14.95 metres to place 26th in the qualifying round. His personal best in the triple jump was 16.04 metres, set in 1968. He was listed for the long jump and triple jump at the 1968 Summer Olympics but did not start in either event.

At the 1966 Asian Games in Bangkok, Singh won the bronze medal in the triple jump with 15.49 metres.

With fellow triple jumper Mohinder Singh Gill

At the 1970 Asian Games, also in Bangkok, he won two medals: silver in the triple jump with 15.82 metres, behind Mohinder Singh Gill, and bronze in the long jump with 7.45 metres. The history of the Mechanised Infantry Regimental Centre describes him as the only Indian athlete to win two medals at the 1970 Games, and as a former national record holder in the triple jump.

With the Indian team and delegates

== Military career ==
Singh holds a BA in Economics from Panjab University, Chandigarh, and received staff training at the Defence Services Staff College, Wellington. He was commissioned into the 1st Battalion, the Jat Regiment (1 JAT (LI)), in 1962. He commanded the 2nd Battalion, the Mechanised Infantry Regiment, from 1981 to 1983, and retired as a brigadier in 1992. The Labh Singh Stadium at the Mechanised Infantry Regimental Centre in Ahmednagar is named in his honour.

== Post-retirement ==
After retiring from the Army, Singh served as an honorary sports advisor to the Sports Department of the Government of Punjab, as a member of the Punjab Sports Council, and as vice-president of the District Sainik Welfare Department of the Government of Punjab.

== Honours ==
In 2004, Singh received the Dhyan Chand Award, India's award for lifetime achievement in sports and games, for athletics. The award was presented by the President of India, A. P. J. Abdul Kalam.

== Personal life ==
Singh is married to Subinder Jit Kaur Kehal. The couple have two sons, Ikroop Singh Kehal and Bhalinder Singh Kehal. Ikroop is married to Elena, and they have a daughter, Vera, and a son, Misha. Bhalinder is married to Parneet, and they have a daughter, Aria, and a son, Taj.

== Records and honours ==
=== Awards ===
| Medal | Event | Category | Source |
|---|---|---|---|
| Bronze | 1966 Asian Games, Bangkok | Triple jump | |
| Silver | 1970 Asian Games, Bangkok | Triple jump | |
| Bronze | 1970 Asian Games, Bangkok | Long jump | |

=== Honours ===
| Honour | Year | Source |
|---|---|---|
| Dhyan Chand Award | 2004 | |
