= Ole Sorensen (wrestler) =

Canadian wrestler (born 1948)

Personal information
- Nationality: Canadian
- Born: 23 April 1948 (age 78) Randers, Denmark

Sport
- Sport: Wrestling

Ole Sorensen (born 23 April 1948) is a Canadian wrestler. He competed in the men's Greco-Roman 68 kg at the 1972 Summer Olympics.
