= Alfred Wurr =

Canadian wrestler (born 1943)

Alfred Wurr (born 28 June 1943, in Hamburg) is a Canadian former wrestler who competed in the 1972 Summer Olympics. He was inducted into the Manitoba Sports Hall of Fame in 1982.

== See also ==
- List of German Canadians
