= Muhammad Nazir (wrestler, born 1936) =

Pakistani wrestler (born 1936)

Personal information
- Nationality: Pakistani / British
- Born: 19 May 1936 (age 90) Pakistan

Sport
- Sport: Amateur wrestling
Medal record
Men's freestyle wrestling
Representing Pakistan
Commonwealth Games
Gold medal – first place	1966 Kingston	Flyweight
Silver medal – second place	1970 Edinburgh	Flyweight

Muhammad Nazir (born 19 May 1936) is a former amateur wrestler from Pakistan who competed at the 1956 Summer Olympics.

== Biography ==
At the 1956 Olympic Games in Melbourne, Australia, Nazir competed in the men's freestyle featherweight competition.

Nazir competed for Pakistan at two Commonwealth Games, winning the gold medal in the flyweight category in 1966 and the silver medal four years later in the same category.

After the 1970 Games he refused to return home to Pakistan believing that the political troubles there would lead to persecution. The Asian community harboured him illegally until he was given amnesty and he went on to represent Great Britain in international competition.

Nazir was a two-times winner of the British Wrestling Championships in 1977 and 1978.
