= Faiz Mohammad Khaksar =

Afghan wrestler (born 1942)

Faiz Mohammad Khaksar (born 6 August 1942 in Kabul) was an Afghan wrestler, who competed at the 1960 and the 1964 Summer Olympic Games in the flyweight freestyle event. He also finished 4th at the 1962 Asian Games.
