= Ed Millard =

Canadian wrestler (born 1946)

Personal information
- Born: 6 November 1946 Canada
- Died: 13 October 2024 (aged 77)

Sport
- Sport: Wrestling

Ed Millard (6 November 1946 – 13 October 2024) was a Canadian wrestler. He competed in two events at the 1968 Summer Olympics.
