= Sardar Muhammad (wrestler) =

Pakistani wrestler (born 1944)

Personal information
- Nationality: Pakistani
- Born: 2 March 1944 (age 82) Lahore, Pakistan

Sport
- Sport: Wrestling
Medal record
Commonwealth Games
Gold medal – first place	1970 Edinburgh	Bantamweight
Asian Games
Bronze medal – third place	1970 Bangkok	57 kg

Sardar Muhammad (born 2 March 1944) is a Pakistani former wrestler and the 1970 Commonwealth Games Bantamweight wrestling champion. He competed in the men's freestyle 57 kg at the 1968 Summer Olympics.

Sardar also represented Pakistan at the 1970 Asian Games, where he won the bronze medal in the 57 kg division.
