= Phil May (athlete) =

Australian long and triple jumper (1944–2014)

Personal information
- Born: 20 September 1944
- Died: 30 November 2014 (aged 70)
Medal record
Men's Athletics
Representing Australia
Commonwealth Games
Gold medal – first place	1970 Edinburgh	Triple Jump
Silver medal – second place	1970 Edinburgh	Long Jump

Philip John May (20 September 1944 – 30 November 2014) was an Olympic athlete from Australia. He specialised in the triple jump and long jump events, and was a formidable relay runner in the 4 × 100.

May represented Australia at three Commonwealth Games and one Olympic Games, finishing sixth in the Triple Jump at the 1968 Olympic Games in Mexico City.

Between 1965 and 1973 May won ten Australian Championships in two field events, namely triple jump (six) and long jump (four).

== World rankings ==
Phil was ranked in the Top 10 in the World for four consecutive years by the prestigious Track & Field News magazine.

Year	Event	Ranked
1968	Triple Jump	6th
1969	Triple Jump	6th
1970	Triple Jump	5th
1970	Long Jump	6th
1971	Triple Jump	10th

== Post-playing career ==
May is the co-founder of Dôme café chain.
