= Malwa Singh =

Indian wrestler

Personal information
- Nationality: Indian
- Born: 20 March 1946 Delhi, India
- Died: 27 April 1990 (aged 44) Delhi, India

Sport
- Sport: Wrestling

Malwa Singh (20 March 1946 – 27 April 1990) was an Indian wrestler who competed in two events at the 1964 Summer Olympics.
