= Patrick Bolger =

Canadian wrestler and judoka (1948–2024)

Patrick Bolger (31 January 1948 – 10 September 2024) was a Canadian wrestler and judoka who competed in wrestling at the 1968 Summer Olympics and 1972 Summer Olympics. Bolger died on 10 September 2024, at the age of 76.

== See also ==
- Judo in Canada
