= Abraham Munabi =

Ugandan triple jumper

Personal information
- Nationality: Ugandan
- Born: 19 December 1940 (age 85)

Sport
- Sport: Athletics
- Event: Triple jump
Medal record
Representing Uganda
African Games
Silver medal – second place	1973 Lagos	Triple jump

Abraham Munabi (born 19 December 1940) is a Ugandan athlete. He competed in the men's triple jump at the 1972 Summer Olympics.
