= George Ogan =

Nigerian triple jumper

Personal information
- Nationality: Nigerian
- Born: 20 July 1938 (age 87)

Sport
- Sport: Athletics
- Event: Triple jump

George Ogan (born 20 July 1938) is a Nigerian athlete. He competed in the men's triple jump at the 1964 Summer Olympics.
