= David Aspin =

New Zealand wrestler (born 1950)

Personal information
- Full name: David Anthony Aspin
- Born: 24 June 1950 (age 76) Waiuku, New Zealand
Medal record
Men's freestyle wrestling
Representing New Zealand
Commonwealth Games
Gold medal – first place	1974 Christchurch	Middleweight
Bronze medal – third place	1970 Edinburgh	Middleweight

David Anthony Aspin (born 24 June 1950) is a wrestler from Waiuku, New Zealand. He competed in the freestyle wrestling discipline, where he was the 1974 Commonwealth Games champion and 1970 Commonwealth Games bronze medalist, in the middleweight category. He was also New Zealand's flag bearer at the opening ceremonies of the 1972 Summer Olympics, in Munich, and at the 1976 Summer Olympics in Montreal. Aspin and Arthur Porritt are the only New Zealand Olympians to have carried the flag at two different Olympics.
