= Sudesh Kumar =

Indian wrestler (born 1950)

Sudesh Kumar (born 10 March 1950) is an Indian former wrestler who competed in the 1968 Summer Olympics and in the 1972 Summer Olympics.
