= Udey Chand =

Indian wrestler and coach (born 1935)

- Born: 25 June 1935 (age 91); Jandli village, fatehabad District, Haryana
- Occupations: Sports wrestler, wrestling coach
- Height: 5 ft 9 in (175 cm)

Udey Chand
Medal record

Representing India

Men's Freestyle, Greco-Roman wrestling

FILA Wrestling World Championships
Bronze medal – third place	1961 Yokohama	Freestyle

Commonwealth Games
Gold medal – first place	1970 Edinburgh	Lightweight

Asian Games
Silver medal – second place	1962 Jakarta	Men's Freestyle 70kg
Silver medal – second place	1962 Jakarta	Men's Greco-Roman 70 kg
Bronze medal – third place	1966 Bangkok	Men's Freestyle

Udey Chand (born 25 June 1935) is a retired Indian wrestler and wrestling coach. He is the first Indian to won a medal at world wrestling championships in 1961. He was awarded the first Arjuna Award in wrestling in 1961 by Government of India.

== Early life ==
Chand was born on 25 June 1935 in Jandli village of Hisar district and currently resides in Hisar.

== Career ==
He started his career with the Indian Army. He created history by winning a bronze medal in Light Weight (67 kg) Freestyle at 1961 World Wrestling Championships at Yokohama. During his bout against the eventual world champion Mahamed-Ali Sanatkaran he was particularly unlucky as referees judged his throwing down of the opponent outside the area and the bout ended in a 1–1 draw. For his achievements he was conferred the first Arjuna Award in wrestling in 1961 by President of India,.

He participated in three Olympic Games namely Rome 1960, Tokyo 1964, Mexico City 1968 and finished with a creditable 6th Rank in Mexico City.

He took part twice in Asian Games winning two silver medals in 70 kg Freestyle as well as 70 kg Greco-Roman at 1962 Asian Games Jakarta and won a bronze medal in 70 kg Freestyle at 1966 Asian Games Bangkok. In addition to these he participated in four different world wrestling championships i.e. Yokohama 1961, Manchester 1965, Delhi 1967 and Edmonton 1970. He signed off his glittering career with a befitting gold medal at 1970 British Commonwealth Games held at Edinburgh, Scotland.

He remained an undisputed national champion in India from 1958 to 1970.

== Later life ==
After retiring from Indian Army he joined Chaudhary Charan Singh Haryana Agricultural University, Hisar as a coach and rendered his services from 1970 to 1996. During his time as coach he groomed many international level wrestlers and guided the university team to many All Indian Inter University Championship triumphs.

Currently he lives in Hisar and still actively assists budding wrestlers.
