= Lakshmikant Pandey =

Indian wrestler (born 1936)

Personal information
- Nationality: Indian
- Born: 1936 (age 89–90)

Sport
- Sport: Wrestling
Medal record
Representing India
British Empire and Commonwealth Games
Silver medal – second place	1958 Cardiff	-73 kg

Lakshmikant Pandey (born 1936) is an Indian wrestler. He competed in the men's freestyle lightweight at the 1956 Summer Olympics.
