= Shunichi Kawano =

Japanese freestyle wrestler

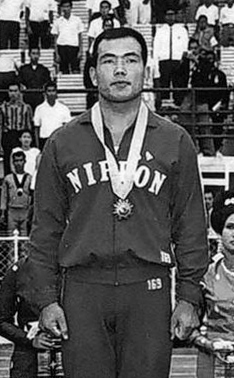
- Kawano at the 1966 Asian Games

Personal information
- Born: November 29, 1936 Nagasaki Prefecture, Japan
- Died: May 12, 2009 (aged 72) Hakone, Japan
- Height: 177 cm (5 ft 10 in)
- Weight: 87 kg (192 lb)

Sport
- Sport: Freestyle wrestling
Medal record
Representing Japan
World Wrestling Championships
Bronze medal – third place	1962 Toledo	-87 kg
Asian Games
Gold medal – first place	1962 Jakarta	-87 kg
Bronze medal – third place	1966 Bangkok	-97 kg

Shunichi Kawano (Japanese: 川野 俊一, November 29, 1936 – May 12, 2009) was a Japanese heavyweight freestyle wrestler. He won a gold medal at the 1962 Asian Games and bronze medals at the 1962 World Championships and 1966 Asian Games. He competed at the 1960, 1964 and 1968 Olympics with the best result of eighth place in 1960.
