= Yutaka Kaneko =

Japanese sport wrestler (born 1933)

Yutaka Kaneko (兼子 隆, Kaneko Yutaka; born 21 April 1933) is a Japanese former wrestler who competed in the 1960 Summer Olympics.
