= Gordon Mackay (wrestler) =

New Zealand wrestler

Medal record

Men's freestyle wrestling

Representing New Zealand

British Commonwealth Games
Bronze medal – third place	1970 Edinburgh	74 kg
Bronze medal – third place	1974 Christchurch	74 kg

Gordon Mackay is a former wrestler from New Zealand.

He won the bronze medal at the 1970 British Commonwealth Games in the men's 74 kg event. Four years later at the 1974 British Commonwealth Games he repeated the feat, again winning the bronze medal.
