= Ganpat Andalkar =

Indian wrestler (born 1935)

Ganpatrao Andalkar
Personal information
- Nationality: Indian
- Born: 15 April 1935 (age 90); Punwat, India

Sport
- Sport: Wrestling

Ganpat Andalkar (born 15 April 1935) is an Indian wrestler. He competed in two events at the 1964 Summer Olympics. He was the recipient of the Arjuna Award in 1964 for his contribution to wrestling.
