= Mohinder Singh Gill =

Indian triple jumper

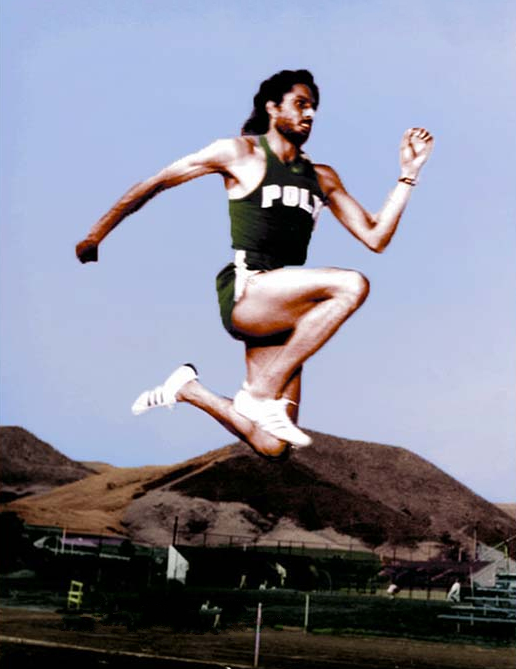
- Mohinder Singh Gill

Personal information
- Full name: Mohinder Singh Gill
- Nationality: American
- Height: 182 cm (6 ft 0 in)
- Weight: 75 kg (165 lb)

Sport
- Country: India
- Sport: Track and field
- Event: Triple jump

Achievements and titles
- Personal best: TJ – 16.79 (1971) Indian Record for almost 40 years. 57’ 5.5” (1972 ) Controversial foul was measured over World Record.
Medal record
Representing India
Commonwealth Games
Bronze medal – third place	1970 Edinburgh	Triple jump
Silver medal – second place	1974 Christchurch	Triple jump
Asian Games
Gold medal – first place	1970 Bangkok	Triple jump
Silver medal – second place	1974 Tehran	Triple jump
Asian Championships
Gold medal – first place	1973 Manila	Triple jump
Pre-Olympics
Silver medal – second place	1971 Munich	Triple Jump
Silver medal – second place	1972 Munich	Triple Jump

Mohinder Singh Gill is a retired Indian triple jumper who competed at the 1972 Munich Olympics.

Gill won 52 major international invitational competitions in North America and Europe, setting 19 new records in the process. In addition, he won five NCAA Championships, all with new records. Some of those records stood 40 years later.

== Early life ==
Gill was sent for playing volleyball when he was in eighth grade. After three years, he quit volleyball and took up high jump. When he failed in high jump in a championship at the age of 17, he tried triple jump and won with a jump of 41 feet and 4 inches. After this, he received a sports scholarship from the Kurukshtetra University. He attended for one year before moving to Cal Poly in San Luis Obispo.

== College career ==
Gill attended Cal Poly, competing in the triple jump from 1968 to 1971, winning five total NCAA championships between divisions and setting five combined NCAA records.

In August 1970, while majoring in business administration, he was selected as the CCAA's Male Athlete of the Year for all sports.

On May 8, 1971, Gill triple-jumped to a mark of 55 feet, 1.25 inches (or 16.79m) at the West Coast Relays in Fresno, producing the second-longest triple jump ever on American soil at the time, and earning Outstanding Athlete of the Meet accolades. As a Cal Poly senior in 1971, he ranked sixth in the world during the year.

During an era when intercollegiate athletes could move up from the College Division ranks, Gill went on to claim two NCAA Division I individual outdoor national championships: first in 1970 at Drake and then again in 1971 in Seattle.

A profile in the Sacramento Bee in 1971 described Gill as "Six feet, 163 pounds, fast enough to run 100 yards in 9.6 seconds, strong enough to do squat jumps with 300 pounds across his shoulders, dead-lift 500 pounds, practice half squats carrying 650 pounds and to do toe raises packing 700 pounds."

For indoor competition, Gill also won the 1971 NCAA crown in Detroit.

== International success ==
In 1970, Gill was given India's highest sports award, the Arjuna Award.

After placing second in a pre-Olympic meet in Munich, he competed while injured in 1972 and failed to reach the final. Gill won one gold and one silver medal at the Asian Games.

Gill won two of India's five-ever medals at the Commonwealth Games. There were attempts to remove him from the national team, but Prime Minister Indira Gandhi intervened to allow him to compete.

== Later years ==
He was elected into the Cal Poly Mustangs' Hall of Fame in 1993 as the only Asian to receive the honor. He currently resides in Turlock in central California.
