= Sajjan Singh (wrestler) =

Indian wrestler

Personal information
- Nationality: Indian
- Born: 24 April 1932 (age 94) Mahendragarh district, India

Sport
- Sport: Wrestling

Sajjan Singh (born 24 April 1932) is an Indian wrestler. He competed in the men's freestyle light heavyweight at the 1960 Summer Olympics.
