= Faiz Muhammad =

Pakistani wrestler (1937–2014)

Personal information
- Nationality: Pakistani
- Born: 23 September 1937
- Died: 29 October 2014

Sport
- Sport: Wrestling
Medal record
Asian Games
Bronze medal – third place	1962 Jakarta	Greco-Roman 87 kg
Commonwealth Games
Gold medal – first place	1962 Perth	Middleweight
Gold medal – first place	1966 Kingston	Middleweight
Gold medal – first place	1970 Edinburgh	Light Heavyweight

Faiz Muhammad (23 September 1937 – 29 October 2014) was a Pakistani freestyle wrestler. He was from the 5 Azad Kashmir Regiment (HAIDER DIL BN). During his time, he won many national and army championships in Pakistan and was also a three-time Commonwealth Games Champion (1962, 1966, 1970).

Muhammad Faiz had the following finishes at major championships – 1962 Commonwealth Games: 87.0 kg. Freestyle (1st); 1966 Commonwealth Games: 87.0 kg. Freestyle (1st); 1970 Commonwealth Games: 90.0 kg. Freestyle (1st); 1962 Asian Games: 87.0 kg. Greco-Roman (3rd); 1970 Asian Games: 90.0 kg. Freestyle (5th).

== Early life and career ==
Muhammad was born in 1937 in the Kandi (Rajauri district area of Jammu and Kashmir) and migrated to Azad Kashmir after the partition of British India in 1947. His family settled in Khanpur village, present day Kotli District of Azad Kashmir.

In June 1953, he was enlisted at training center number 3 of Azad Kashmir Regular Forces at Sohawa town (a village at that time). He had his first success in wrestling by winning the Pakistan Army Training Centres Wrestling Championship, an army-level competition. In the same year, he won the National and Army Wrestling Championships. He won the Army Championship every year from 1954 to 1984 and won several gold medals. At Pakistani national level, he is the only one who has this-record of Army Championships. From 1953 to 1986, he won the National Wrestling Championship for 33 years.
