= India at the 1974 British Commonwealth Games =

- CG code: IND
- CGA: Indian Olympic Association
- Website: olympic.ind.in

in Christchurch, New Zealand
- Competitors: 19 in 5 sports
- Medals Ranked 6th: Gold 4 Silver 8 Bronze 3 Total 15

British Commonwealth Games appearances
- 1934; 1938; 1950; 1954; 1958; 1962; 1966; 1970; 1974; 1978; 1982; 1986; 1990; 1994; 1998; 2002; 2006; 2010; 2014; 2018; 2022; 2026; 2030

India competed at the 1974 British Commonwealth Games held in Christchurch, New Zealand, from 24 January to 2 February 1974. It was the country's seventh appearance at the Commonwealth Games since making its debut at the 1934 British Empire Games.

The Indian contingent consisted of 19 competitors who participated in five sports. India won a total of 15 medals, comprising four gold, eight silver and three bronze medals, to finish sixth in the overall medal table.

== Medalists ==
India won fifteen medals, including four gold, eight silver and three bronze medals, and finished sixth in the overall medal table. Wrestling was India's most successful sport, contributing eleven medals, while weightlifting added two medals.

Medal	Name	Sport	Event
(gold) Gold	Sudesh Kumar	Wrestling	Flyweight 52 kg
(gold) Gold	Prem Nath	Wrestling	Bantamweight 57 kg
(gold) Gold	Jagrup Singh	Wrestling	Lightweight 68 kg
(gold) Gold	Raghunath Pawar	Wrestling	Welterweight 74 kg
(silver) Silver	Mohinder Singh Gill	Athletics	Men's triple jump
(silver) Silver	Chandra Narayanan	Boxing	Flyweight 51 kg
(silver) Silver	Anil Mondal	Weightlifting	Flyweight 52 kg
(silver) Silver	Shivaji Chingle	Wrestling	Featherweight 62 kg
(silver) Silver	Satpal Singh	Wrestling	Middleweight 82 kg
(silver) Silver	Netra Pal Singh	Wrestling	Light heavyweight 90 kg
(silver) Silver	Dadu Chaugule	Wrestling	Heavyweight 100 kg
(silver) Silver	Bishwanath Singh	Wrestling	Super heavyweight +100 kg
(bronze) Bronze	Muniswami Venu	Boxing	Lightweight 60 kg
(bronze) Bronze	Shanmug Velliswamy	Weightlifting	Bantamweight 56 kg
(bronze) Bronze	Radhey Shyam	Wrestling	Light flyweight 48 kg

== Competitors ==
The Indian contingent consisted of 19 competitors who competed across five sports.

Sport	Men	Women	Total
Athletics	1	0	1
Badminton	3	0	3
Boxing	3	—N/a	3
Weightlifting	3	—N/a	3
Wrestling	9	—N/a	9
Total	19	0	19

== Athletics ==
Mohinder Singh Gill won the silver medal in the men's triple jump with a jump of 16.44 m (53.9 ft).

=== Field ===
Athlete	Event	Qualification		Final	
Athlete	Event	Result	Rank	Result	Rank
Mohinder Singh Gill	Men's triple jump	Bye		16.44 m	2nd place, silver medalist(s)

== Badminton ==
Athlete	Event	First round	Second round	Third round	Quarterfinal	Semifinal	Final / BM	
Athlete	Event	Opposition Result	Opposition Result	Opposition Result	Opposition Result	Opposition Result	Opposition Result	Rank
Prakash Padukone	Men's singles	Bye	Ghulam (KEN); W 15–1, 15–4	Soong (MAS); W 15–8, 15–8	Talbot (ENG); L 9–15, 6–15	Did not advance		
Asif Parpia	Men's singles	Doherty (NIR); W 15–8, 15–2	Tan (MAS); L 6–15, 0–0 Ret.	Did not advance				
Devinder Ahuja	Men's singles	Bye	Livingston (NZL); L 10–15, 17–14, 15–18	Did not advance				

Legend

- W – Win; L – Loss;
- Ret. – Retired

== Boxing ==
India won two medals in boxing at the 1974 British Commonwealth Games, with Chandra Narayanan winning silver in the flyweight division and Muniswami Venu winning bronze in the lightweight division.

Athlete	Event	Preliminary	Quarter-final	Semi-final	Final	Rank
Athlete	Event	Opposition Result	Opposition Result	Opposition Result	Opposition Result	Rank
Shivran Sutar	Light-flyweight under 48 kg	Bambrick (SCO); L VPO	Did not advance			
Chandra Narayanan	Flyweight 51 kg	Eki (PNG); W VPO	Findo (KEN); W VPO	Byaruhanga (UGA); W VPO	Larmour (NIR); L VPO	2nd place, silver medalist(s)
Muniswami Venu	Lightweight 60 kg	Heritage (FIJ); W KO	Oduori (KEN); W WO	Amah (NGR); L VPO	Did not advance	3rd place, bronze medalist(s)

Legend

- W – Win; L – Loss;
- VPO – Victory by Points; KO – Knockout; WO – Walkover

== Weightlifting ==
India won two medals in weightlifting at the 1974 British Commonwealth Games, with Anil Mondal winning silver in the flyweight division and Shanmug Velliswamy winning bronze in the bantamweight division.

Athlete	Event	Result	Rank
Anil Mondal	Flyweight 52 kg	200 kg	2nd place, silver medalist(s)
Dulal Chaudhury	Flyweight 52 kg	187.5 kg	5
Shanmug Velliswamy	Bantamweight 56 kg	212.5 kg	3rd place, bronze medalist(s)

== Wrestling ==
India won four golds, four silvers and one bronze medal in wrestling at the 1974 Games.

Freestyle men

Athlete	Event	Competition rounds				Rank
Athlete	Event	Opposition Result	Opposition Result	Opposition Result	Opposition Result	Rank
Radhey Shyam	Light flyweight 48 kg	Kawasaki (CAN); L VPO	Koenig (AUS); L ?	—N/a		3rd place, bronze medalist(s)
Sudesh Kumar	Flyweight 52 kg	McMahon (NZL); W VFA	Bertie (CAN); W VPO	Navie (AUS); W VFA	—N/a	1st place, gold medalist(s)
Prem Nath	Bantamweight 57 kg	Gill (ENG); W VPO	Burke (AUS); W VPO	Wenzell (CAN); W VPO	—N/a	1st place, gold medalist(s)
Shivaji Chingle	Featherweight 62 kg	Roche (NZL); W VPO	Beiler (CAN); L VFA	Brown (AUS); W VPO	—N/a	2nd place, silver medalist(s)
Jagrup Singh	Lightweight 68 kg	Gilligan (ENG); W VPO	Anderson (SCO); W VPO	Martin (CAN); W VPO	Dalley (NZL); W VPO	1st place, gold medalist(s)
Raghunath Pawar	Welterweight 74 kg	Mackay (NZL); W VPO	Akers (AUS); W VPO	Shacklady (ENG); W ?	—N/a	1st place, gold medalist(s)
Satpal Singh	Middleweight 82 kg	Kelly (SCO); W VPO	O'Brien (AUS); D BDQ	Hryb (CAN); W VFA	Aspin (NZL); L VPO	2nd place, silver medalist(s)
Netra Pal Singh	Light heavyweight 90 kg	Allan (SCO); W VPO	Paice (CAN); L DQ	Downey (NZL); W VFA	—N/a	2nd place, silver medalist(s)
Dadu Chaugule	Heavyweight 100 kg	Duncan (SCO); W VPO	Jordanov (AUS); W DQ	Pilon (CAN); L VPO	—N/a	2nd place, silver medalist(s)
Bishwanath Singh	Super heavyweight +100 kg	Samrai (AUS); W VPO	Benko (CAN); D BDQ	—N/a		2nd place, silver medalist(s)

Legend

- W – Win; D – Draw; L – Loss;
- VFA – Victory by fall
- VPO – Victory by points
- DQ – Disqualified
- BDQ - Both disqualified
