= India at the 1966 British Empire and Commonwealth Games =

- CG code: IND
- CGA: Indian Olympic Association
- Website: olympic.ind.in

in Kingston, Jamaica
- Competitors: 23
- Medals Ranked 9th: Gold 3 Silver 4 Bronze 3 Total 10

British Empire and Commonwealth Games appearances
- 1934; 1938; 1950; 1954; 1958; 1962; 1966; 1970; 1974; 1978; 1982; 1986; 1990; 1994; 1998; 2002; 2006; 2010; 2014; 2018; 2022; 2026; 2030

India competed at the 1966 British Empire and Commonwealth Games, held in Kingston, from 4 to 26 August 1966. It was the country's fifth appearance at the Commonwealth Games after its debut at the 1934 British Empire Games. India returned to the British Empire and Commonwealth Games after missing the previous edition at Perth.

The Indian contingent consisted of 23 athletes who competed across five sports. India won ten medals including three gold medals and was ranked ninth in the overall medal table.

== Medalists ==
India won ten medals including three gold, four silver, and three bronze medals and was ranked ninth in the overall medal table.

Medal	Name	Sport	Event
(gold) Gold	Bishambar Singh	Wrestling	Bantamweight
(gold) Gold	Mukhtiar Singh	Wrestling	Lightweight
(gold) Gold	Bhim Singh	Wrestling	Heavyweight
(silver) Silver	Shamrao Sable	Wrestling	Flyweight
(silver) Silver	Randhawa Singh	Wrestling	Featherweight
(silver) Silver	Praveen Kumar	Athletics	Men's hammer throw
(silver) Silver	Mohon Lal Ghosh	Weightlifting	Men's 60 kg
(bronze) Bronze	Hukum Singh	Wrestling	Welterweight
(bronze) Bronze	Bishwanath Singh	Wrestling	Light heavyweight
(bronze) Bronze	Dinesh Khanna	Badminton	Men's singles

== Competitors ==
The Indian contingent consisted of 23 athletes who competed across five sports.

Sport	Men	Women	Total
Athletics	6	0	6
Badminton	3	0	3
Boxing	3	—N/a	3
Weightlifting	3	—N/a	3
Wrestling	8	—N/a	8
Total	23	0	23

== Athletics ==
Praveen Kumar won the silver medal in men's hammer throw with a throw of 60.13 m (197.3 ft).

=== Track ===
Athlete	Event	Heat		Quarterfinal		Semifinal		Final	
Athlete	Event	Result	Rank	Result	Rank	Result	Rank	Result	Rank
Edward Sequeira	Men's 1 mile	4:07.0	5	—N/a				Did not qualify	
Kenneth Powell	Men's 100 yds	10.5	6	Did not qualify					
Kenneth Powell	Men's 220 yds	DNS		Did not qualify					
Ajmer Singh	Men's 220 yds	21.8	4 Q	21.8	6	Did not qualify			
Ajmer Singh	Men's 440 yds	DNS		—N/a		Did not qualify			
Gurbachan Singh Randhawa	Men's 120 yds hurdles	14.3	1 Q	—N/a				14.6	7

Legend

- Q – Qualified for the next round

=== Field ===
Athlete	Event	Result	Rank
Praveen Kumar	Men's discus throw	160 ft 8 in (48.97 m)	8
Praveen Kumar	Men's hammer throw	197 ft 3 in (60.12 m)	2nd place, silver medalist(s)
Bhim Singh	Men's high jump	6 ft 2 in (1.880 m)	7

== Badminton ==
Dinesh Khanna won India's first medal in badminton after he secured a bronze medal in the men's individual event.

Athlete	Event	Round of 16	Quarterfinal	Semifinal	Final / BM	
Athlete	Event	Opposition Result	Opposition Result	Opposition Result	Opposition Result	Rank
Dinesh Khanna	Men's singles	Paterson (CAN); W 15–10, 15–4	Mills (ENG); W 15–3, 15–11	Hoe (MAS); L 6–15, 12–15	McCoig (SCO); W 15–8, 15–7	3rd place, bronze medalist(s)
Nandu Natekar	Men's singles	McKenzie (MAS); L 5–15, 10–15	Did not advance			
Suresh Goel	Men's singles	Jennings (WAL); W 15–3, 15–2	Hoe (MAS); L 6–15, 10–15	Did not advance		

Legend

- W – Win; L – Loss;

== Boxing ==
Athlete	Event	Preliminary Round	Quarterfinal	Semifinal	Final	
Athlete	Event	Opposition Result	Opposition Result	Opposition Result	Opposition Result	Rank
Namdeo More	Bantamweight 54 kg	McAuley (ENG); W VPO	Norwood (AUS); W VPO	Did not advance		
Denis Swamy	Featherweight 57 kg	Gunasinghe (SRI); W TKO	Waruinge (KEN); W TKO	Did not advance		
G. Rajan	Lightweight 60 kg	Bye	Lockhart (NIR); L VPO	Did not advance		

Legend

- W – Win; L – Loss;
- TKO– Technical knock out
- VPO – Victory by points
- WO – Walkover

== Weightlifting ==
In men's 60 kg combined event, Mohon Lal Ghosh won the silver medal, while Arun Das was placed fifth.

Athlete	Event	Result	Rank
Mohon Lal Ghosh	Featherweight 60 kg	738 lb (335 kg)	2nd place, silver medalist(s)
Arun Das	Featherweight 60 kg	694 lb (315 kg)	5
Lakshmi Das	Lightweight 67.5 kg	NM	

== Wrestling ==
India won three gold, and two silver and two bronze medals in wrestling.

Freestyle men

Athlete	Event	Competition rounds				Rank
Athlete	Event	Opposition Result	Opposition Result	Opposition Result	Opposition Result	Rank
Shamrao Sable	Flyweight 52 kg	Nazir (PAK); L VPO	Rhodes (ENG); W VPO	—N/a		2nd place, silver medalist(s)
Bishambar Singh	Bantamweight 57 kg	Turnbull (SCO); W VPO	Saeed (PAK); W VPO	Chornomydz (CAN); W VPO	—N/a	1st place, gold medalist(s)
Randhawa Singh	Featherweight 62 kg	Reid (CAN); D	McCourtney (SCO); W DFT	Aspen (ENG); W VPO	Akhtar (PAK); L VPO	2nd place, silver medalist(s)
Mukhtiar Singh	Lightweight 68 kg	Anderson (SCO); W VFA	Greig (NZL); W VPO	Hussein (PAK); W VPO	—N/a	1st place, gold medalist(s)
Hukum Singh	Welterweight 74 kg	Owen (ENG); W VPO	Bryant (CAN); D	Bashir (PAK); L VPO	—N/a	3rd place, bronze medalist(s)
Jit Singh	Middleweight 82 kg	Grinstead (ENG); D	Muhammad (PAK); L VPO	Donison (CAN); L VPO	—N/a	5
Bishwanath Singh	Light heavyweight 90 kg	Riaz (PAK); D	Hill (ENG); W VPO	Chamberot (CAN); L VPO	Booth (CAN); L VPO	3rd place, bronze medalist(s)
Bhim Singh	Heavyweight 100 kg	Geris (CAN); W VPO	Ilahi (PAK); W VPO	—N/a		1st place, gold medalist(s)

Legend

- W – Win; D – Draw; L – Loss;
- VFA – Victory by fall
- VPO – Victory by points
- DFT – Default
