= Wrestling at the 1974 British Commonwealth Games =

- Venue: Christchurch Town Hall
- Location: Christchurch, New Zealand
- Dates: 24 January to 2 February 1974

Wrestling at the 1974 British Commonwealth Games was the tenth appearance of Wrestling at the Commonwealth Games.

The events took place at the newly constructed Christchurch Town Hall in Christchurch, New Zealand, from 24 January to 2 February 1974 and featured contests in ten weight classes.

Canada topped the wrestling medal table by virtue of winning five gold medals and India won a medal in every class.

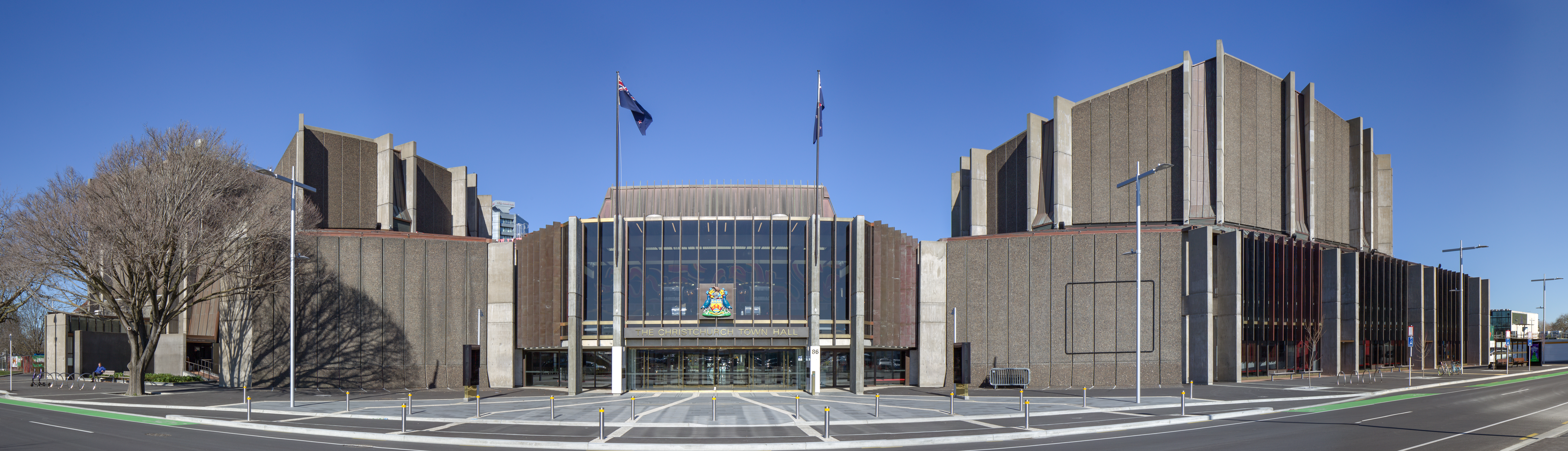
Christchurch Town Hall in 2019

== Medal table ==
* Host nation (New Zealand)

Medals won by nation with totals, ranked by number of golds—sortable
Rank	Nation	Gold	Silver	Bronze	Total
1	Canada	5	1	2	8
2	India	4	5	1	10
3	New Zealand*	1	0	2	3
4	England	0	3	0	3
5	Australia	0	1	3	4
6	Scotland	0	0	2	2
Totals (6 entries)		10	10	10	30

== Medallists ==
Event	Gold	Silver	Bronze
Light flyweight 48kg	Mitchell Kawasaki (CAN)	Wally Koenig (AUS)	Radhey Shyam (IND)
Flyweight 52kg	Sudesh Kumar (IND)	Gordon Bertie (CAN)	John Navie (AUS)
Bantamweight 57kg	Prem Nath (IND)	Amrik Singh Gill (ENG)	Kevin Burke (AUS)
Featherweight 62kg	Egon Beiler (CAN)	Shivaji Chingle (IND)	Ray Brown (AUS)
Lightweight 68kg	Jagrup Singh (IND)	Joey Gilligan (ENG)	Stephen Martin (CAN)
Welterweight 74kg	Raghunath Pawar (IND)	Tony Shacklady (ENG)	Gordon Mackay (NZL)
Middleweight 82kg	Dave Aspin (NZL)	Satpal Singh (IND)	Taras Hryb (CAN)
Light heavyweight 90kg	Terry Paice (CAN)	Netra Pal Singh (IND)	Maurice Allan (SCO)
Heavyweight 100kg	Claude Pilon (CAN)	Dadu Chaugule (IND)	Ian Duncan (SCO)
Super heavyweight +100kg	Bill Benko (CAN)	Bishwanath Singh (IND)	Gary Knight (NZL)

== Results ==
=== Light flyweight 48kg ===
Only three competitiors lined up for the light-flyweight division and included 16-year-old Wally Koenig.

Winner	Loser	Score
Mitchell Kawasaki (CAN)	Wally Koenig (AUS)	pts
Mitchell Kawasaki (CAN)	Radhey Shyam (IND)	pts
Wally Koenig (AUS)	Radhey Shyam (IND)	?

Final positions: 1. Kawasaki 2. Koenig 3. Shyam

=== Flyweight 52kg ===
Winner	Loser	Score
Gordon Bertie (CAN)	John Geoffrey Navie (AUS)	fall 8.33
Sudesh Kumar (IND)	Bruce McMahon (NZL)	fall 7.17
Prem Nath (IND)	Bruce McMahon (NZL)	fall
Sudesh Kumar (IND)	Gordon Bertie (CAN)	pts
Sudesh Kumar (IND)	John Geoffrey Navie (AUS)	fall 2.48

Final positions: 1. Kumar 2. Bertie 3. Navie 4. McMahon

=== Bantamweight 57kg ===
Winner	Loser	Score
Prem Nath (IND)	Amrik Singh Gill (ENG)	pts
Kevin Joseph Burke (AUS)	Barry Oldridge (NZL)	pts
Amrik Singh Gill (ENG)	Tim Wenzell (CAN)	pts
Prem Nath (IND)	Kevin Joseph Burke (AUS)	pts
Prem Nath (IND)	Tim Wenzell (CAN)	pts
Amrik Singh Gill (ENG)	Barry Oldridge (NZL)	pts
Amrik Singh Gill (ENG)	Kevin Joseph Burke (AUS)	pts

Final positions: 1. Nath 2. Gill 3. Burke 4. Oldridge, Wenzell

=== Featherweight 62kg ===
Winner	Loser	Score
Egon Beiler (CAN)	Ray Brown (AUS)	pts
Shivaji Chingle (IND)	Andrew Roche (NZL)	pts
Egon Beiler (CAN)	Paul Toole (ENG)	fall 4.41
Ray Brown (AUS)	Andrew Roche (NZL)	pts
Egon Beiler (CAN)	Shivaji Chingle (IND)	fall 2.25
Ray Brown (AUS)	Paul Toole (ENG)	pts
Shivaji Chingle (IND)	Ray Brown (AUS)	pts

Final positions: 1. Beiler 2. Chingle 3. Brown 4. Toole, Roche

=== Lightweight 68kg ===
Winner	Loser	Score
Stephen Martin (CAN)	Tam Anderson (SCO)	fall 2.33
Jagrup Singh (IND)	Joey Gilligan (ENG)	pts
Paul Dalley (NZL)	Sidney Marsh (AUS)	pts
Jagrup Singh (IND)	Tam Anderson (SCO)	pts
Joey Gilligan (ENG)	Sidney Marsh (AUS)	pts
Stephen Martin (CAN)	Paul Dalley (NZL)	pts
Joey Gilligan (ENG)	Paul Dalley (NZL)	pts
Jagrup Singh (IND)	Stephen Martin (CAN)	pts
Joey Gilligan (ENG)	Stephen Martin (CAN)	pts

Final positions: 1. Jagrup 2. Gilligan 3. Martin 4. Dalley 5. Marsh, Anderson

=== Welterweight 74kg ===
Winner	Loser	Score
Grant Lavallee (CAN)	Bruce Akers (AUS)	draw
Raghunath Pawar (IND)	Gordon Mackay (NZL)	pts
Tony Shacklady (ENG)	Grant Lavallee (CAN)	pts
Raghunath Pawar (IND)	Bruce Akers (AUS)	pts
Gordon Mackay (NZL)	Grant Lavallee (CAN)	pts
Tony Shacklady (ENG)	Bruce Akers (AUS)	pts
Tony Shacklady (ENG)	Gordon Mackay (NZL)	pts
Raghunath Pawar (IND)	Tony Shacklady (ENG)	?

Final positions: 1. Pawar 2. Shacklady 3. Mackay 4. Akers, Lavallee

=== Middleweight 82kg ===
Winner	Loser	Score
Dave Aspin (NZL)	Wesley O'Brien (AUS)	fall 4.49
Satpal Singh (IND)	Charles Kelly (SCO)	pts
Taras Hryb (CAN)	Ronald Grinstead (ENG)	pts
Dave Aspin (NZL)	Ronald Grinstead (ENG)	fall 1.55
Taras Hryb (CAN)	Charles Kelly (SCO)	pts
Satpal Singh (IND)	Wesley O'Brien (AUS)	both disq
Dave Aspin (NZL)	Taras Hryb (CAN)	fall 2.34
Dave Aspin (NZL)	Satpal Singh (IND)	pts
Satpal Singh (IND)	Taras Hryb (CAN)	fall 3.47

Final positions: 1. Aspin 2. Satpal 3. Hryb 4. Grinstead, O'Brien, Kelly

=== Light heavyweight 90kg ===
Winner	Loser	Score
Netra Pal Singh (IND)	Maurice Allan (SCO)	pts
Terry Paice (CAN)	Ilias Lee Michail (AUS)	fall 4.28
Maurice Allan (SCO)	Jim Downey (NZL)	fall 4.46
Terry Paice (CAN)	Netra Pal Singh (IND)	disq
Netra Pal Singh (IND)	Jim Downey (NZL)	fall 2.44
Maurice Allan (SCO)	Ilias Lee Michail (AUS)	fall 2.18
Terry Paice (CAN)	Maurice Allan (SCO)	pts

Final positions: 1. Paice 2. Netra 3. Allan 4. Michail, Downey

=== Heavyweight 100kg ===
Winner	Loser	Score
Dadu Chaugule (IND)	Ian Duncan (SCO)	pts
Claude Pilon (CAN)	Anthony Jordanov (AUS)	fall 1.17
Claude Pilon (CAN)	Ian Duncan (SCO)	fall 2.21
Dadu Chaugule (IND)	Anthony Jordanov (AUS)	disq
Claude Pilon (CAN)	Dadu Chaugule (IND)	pts

Final positions: 1. Pilon 2. Chagule 3. Duncan 4. Jordanov

=== Super heavyweight +100kg ===
Winner	Loser	Score
Bill Benko (CAN)	Willie Robertson (SCO)	fall 1.14
Bishwanath Singh (IND)	Bakhtawer Singh Samrai (AUS)	pts
Willie Robertson (SCO)	Bakhtawer Singh Samrai (AUS)	pts
Bill Benko (CAN)	Gary Knight (NZL)	fall 1.01
Bill Benko (CAN)	Bishwanath Singh (IND)	both disq
Gary Knight (NZL)	Willie Robertson (SCO)	both disq

Final positions: 1. Benko 2. Bishwanath 3. Knight 4. Robertson 5. Samrai

== See also ==
- List of Commonwealth Games medallists in weightlifting
