= Wrestling at the 1968 Summer Olympics – Men's freestyle 57 kg =

Men's freestyle 57 kg at the Games of the XIX Olympiad
- Venue: Insurgentes Ice Rink
- Dates: 17–20 October 1968
- Competitors: 21 from 21 nations

Medalists
1st place, gold medalist(s)		Yojiro Uetake	Japan
2nd place, silver medalist(s)		Donald Behm	United States
3rd place, bronze medalist(s)		Aboutaleb Talebi	Iran

The Men's Freestyle bantamweight at the 1968 Summer Olympics as part of the wrestling program were held at the Insurgentes Ice Rink. The bantamweight was the second-lightest weight class, allowing wrestlers up to 57 kilograms.

== Medalists ==
Gold	Yojiro Uetake; Japan
Silver	Donald Behm; United States
Bronze	Aboutaleb Talebi; Iran

== Tournament results ==
The competition used a form of negative points tournament, with negative points given for any result short of a fall. Accumulation of 6 negative points eliminated the wrestler. When only two or three wrestlers remain, a special final round is used to determine the order of the medals.

Legend

- TF — Won by Fall
- DQ — Won by Passivity or forfeit
- D2 — Both wrestlers lost by Passivity
- DNA — Did not appear
- TPP — Total penalty points
- MPP — Match penalty points

Penalties

- 0 — Won by Fall and Disqualification
- 0.5 — Won by Technical Superiority
- 1 — Won by Points
- 2 — Draw
- 2.5 — Draw, Passivity
- 3 — Lost by Points
- 3.5 — Lost by Technical Superiority
- 4 — Lost by Fall and Disqualification

=== 1st round ===
TPP	MPP		Score		MPP	TPP
0	0	Herbert Singerman (CAN)	TF / 5:02	Rogelio Famatid (PHI)	4	4
1	1	Hasan Sevinç (TUR)		Simeon Šutev (YUG)	3	3
3	3	Jang Gyeong-mu (KOR)		Ivan Shavov (BUL)	1	1
4	4	Marco Terán (ECU)	TF / 2:47	Yojiro Uetake (JPN)	0	0
1	1	Zbigniew Żedzicki (POL)		Horst Mayer (GDR)	3	3
1	1	Pekka Alanen (FIN)		Nicolae Cristea (ROU)	3	3
4	4	Moises López (MEX)	DQ	Ali Aliyev (URS)	0	0
3	3	Ahmad Djan (AFG)		Bazaryn Sükhbaatar (MGL)	1	1
0.5	0.5	Aboutaleb Talebi (IRN)		Javier Raxon (GUA)	3.5	3.5
3	3	Muhammad Sardar (PAK)		Donald Behm (USA)	1	1
0		Bishambar Singh (IND)		Bye		

=== 2nd round ===
TPP	MPP		Score		MPP	TPP
0.5	0.5	Bishambar Singh (IND)		Herbert Singerman (CAN)	3.5	3.5
2	1	Hasan Sevinç (TUR)		Chang Kyung-Mu (KOR)	3	6
7	4	Simeon Šutev (YUG)	TF / 9:00	Ivan Shavov (BUL)	0	1
8	4	Marco Terán (ECU)	TF / 2:10	Zbigniew Żedzicki (POL)	0	1
0	0	Yojiro Uetake (JPN)	TF / 1:43	Horst Mayer (GDR)	4	7
4.5	3.5	Pekka Alanen (FIN)		Moises López (MEX)	0.5	4.5
6	3	Nicolae Cristea (ROU)		Ali Aliyev (URS)	1	1
6	3	Ahmad Djan (AFG)		Aboutaleb Talebi (IRN)	1	1.5
4	3	Bazaryn Sükhbaatar (MGL)		Sardar Muhammad (PAK)	1	4
7.5	4	Javier Raxon (GUA)	TF / 6:20	Donald Behm (USA)	0	1
4		Rogelio Famatid (PHI)		DNA		

=== 3rd round ===
TPP	MPP		Score		MPP	TPP
1.5	1	Bishambar Singh (IND)		Hasan Sevinç (TUR)	3	5
7.5	4	Herbert Singerman (CAN)	TF / 1:08	Ivan Shavov (BUL)	0	1
1	1	Yojiro Uetake (JPN)		Zbigniew Żedzicki (POL)	3	4
8	3.5	Pekka Alanen (FIN)		Ali Aliyev (URS)	0.5	1.5
8.5	4	Moises López (MEX)	TF / 9:52	Bazaryn Sükhbaatar (MGL)	0	4
2.5	1	Aboutaleb Talebi (IRN)		Sardar Muhammad (PAK)	3	7
1		Donald Behm (USA)		Bye		

=== 4th round ===
TPP	MPP		Score		MPP	TPP
1.5	0.5	Donald Behm (USA)		Bishambar Singh (IND)	3.5	5
7.5	2.5	Hasan Sevinç (TUR)		Ivan Shavov (BUL)	2.5	3.5
3	2	Yojiro Uetake (JPN)		Ali Aliyev (URS)	2	3.5
5	1	Zbigniew Żedzicki (POL)		Bazaryn Sükhbaatar (MGL)	3	7
2.5		Aboutaleb Talebi (IRN)		Bye		

=== 5th round ===
TPP	MPP		Score		MPP	TPP
3.5	1	Aboutaleb Talebi (IRN)		Donald Behm (USA)	3	4.5
8.5	3.5	Bishambar Singh (IND)		Yojiro Uetake (JPN)	0.5	3.5
4.5	1	Ivan Shavov (BUL)		Zbigniew Żedzicki (POL)	3	8
3.5		Ali Aliyev (URS)		Bye		

=== 6th round ===
TPP	MPP		Score		MPP	TPP
5.5	2	Ali Aliyev (URS)		Aboutaleb Talebi (IRN)	2	5.5
5.5	1	Donald Behm (USA)		Ivan Shavov (BUL)	3	7.5
3.5		Yojiro Uetake (JPN)		Bye		

=== 7th round ===
TPP	MPP		Score		MPP	TPP
5.5	2	Yojiro Uetake (JPN)		Aboutaleb Talebi (IRN)	2	7.5
8.5	3	Ali Aliyev (URS)		Donald Behm (USA)	1	6.5

== Final standings ==
1. Yojiro Uetake (JPN)
2. Donald Behm (USA)
3. Aboutaleb Talebi (IRI)
4. Ali Aliyev (URS)
5. Ivan Shavov (BUL)
6. Zbigniew Żedzicki (POL)
