= Wrestling at the 1966 British Empire and Commonwealth Games =

- Venue: Kingston Convention Hall
- Location: Independence Park, Kingston, Jamaica
- Dates: 4 to 13 August 1966

Wrestling at the 1966 British Empire and Commonwealth Games was the eighth appearance of Wrestling at the Commonwealth Games. The events were held in Kingston, Jamaica and featured contests in eight weight classes.

The wrestling events were held in the Kingston Convention Hall in Independence Park.

Pakistan topped the wrestling medal table again by virtue of winning four of the eight gold medals on offer.

== Medal table ==
* Host nation (Jamaica)

Medals won by nation with totals, ranked by number of golds—sortable
Rank	Nation	Gold	Silver	Bronze	Total
1	Pakistan	4	1	1	6
2	India	3	2	2	7
3	Canada	1	3	1	5
4	Australia	0	1	1	2
5	Scotland	0	1	0	1
6	England	0	0	2	2
7	New Zealand	0	0	1	1
Totals (7 entries)		8	8	8	24

== Medallists ==
Weight	Gold	Silver	Bronze
Flyweight 52kg	Muhammad Nazir (PAK)	Shamrao Sable (IND)	Peter Michienzi (CAN)
Bantamweight 57kg	Bishambar Singh (IND)	Kevin McGrath (AUS)	Muhammad Saeed (PAK)
Featherweight 62kg	Muhammad Akhtar (PAK)	Randhawa Singh (IND)	Bert Aspen (ENG)
Lightweight 68kg	Mukhtiar Singh (IND)	Ray Lougheed (CAN)	Tony Greig (NZL)
Welterweight 74kg	Muhammad Bashir (PAK)	Rick Bryant (CAN)	Hukum Singh (IND)
Middleweight 82kg	Faiz Muhammad (PAK)	Sébastien Donison (CAN)	Michael Benarik (AUS)
Light heavyweight 90kg	Robert Chamberot (CAN)	Wallace Booth (SCO)	Bishwanath Singh (IND)
Heavyweight 100kg	Bhim Singh (IND)	Ikram Ilahi (PAK)	Denis McNamara (ENG)

== Results ==
=== Flyweight 52kg ===
Winner	Loser	Score
Peter Michienzi (CAN)	Alf Rhodes (ENG)	pinned
Muhammad Nazir (PAK)	Shamrao Sable (IND)	Points
Muhammad Nazir (PAK)	Peter Michienzi (CAN)	Points
Shamrao Sable (IND)	Alf Rhodes (ENG)	Points

Final positions: 1. Nazir 2. Sable 3. Michienzi 4. Rhodes

=== Bantamweight 57kg ===
Winner	Loser	Score
Muhammad Saeed (PAK)	Ernest Chornomydz (CAN)	Points
Kevin McGrath (AUS)	Andy Bailey (ENG)	Points
Bishambar Singh (IND)	Jim Turnbull (SCO)	Points
Ernest Chornomydz (CAN)	Andy Bailey (ENG)	Points
Bishambar Singh (IND)	Muhammad Saeed (PAK)	Points
Kevin McGrath (AUS)	Jim Turnbull (SCO)	Points
Bishambar Singh (IND)	Ernest Chornomydz (CAN)	Points
Kevin McGrath (AUS)	Muhammad Saeed (PAK)	draw

Final positions: 1. Singh 2. McGrath 3. Saeed 4. Chornomydz 5. Bailey & Turnbull

=== Featherweight 62kg ===
Winner	Loser	Score
B. N. Tolliday (South Arabia)	John McCourtney (SCO)	ret
Randhawa Singh (IND)	G Reid (CAN)	draw
Bert Aspen (ENG)	Neil Scott (NZL)	Points
Muhammad Akhtar (PAK)	B. N. Tolliday (South Arabia)	retired
Randhawa Singh (IND)	John McCourtney (SCO)	default
G Reid (CAN)	Neil Scott (NZL)	Points
Randhawa Singh (IND)	Bert Aspen (ENG)	Points
Muhammad Akhtar (PAK)	G Reid (CAN)	Points
Muhammad Akhtar (PAK)	Bert Aspen (ENG)	Points
Muhammad Akhtar (PAK)	Randhawa Singh (IND)	Points

Final positions: 1. Akhtar 2. Singh 3. Aspen 4. Reid 5. Tolliday 6. Scott & McCourtney

=== Lightweight 68kg ===
Winner	Loser	Score
Ray Lougheed (CAN)	Tam Anderson (SCO)	Points
M Hussein (PAK)	Sid Marsh (AUS)	Points
Tony Greig (NZL)	Stan Gilligan (ENG)	Points
Mukhtiar Singh (IND)	Tam Anderson (SCO)	fall
Ray Lougheed (CAN)	Sid Marsh (AUS)	Points
M Hussein (PAK)	Stan Gilligan (ENG)	Points
Mukhtiar Singh (IND)	Tony Greig (NZL)	Points
M Hussein (PAK)	Ray Lougheed (CAN)	draw
Tony Greig (NZL)	Ray Lougheed (CAN)	draw
Mukhtiar Singh (IND)	M Hussein (PAK)	points

Final positions: 1. Singh 2. Lougheed 3. Greig 4. Hussein 5. Marsh, Gilligan & Anderson

=== Welterweight 74kg ===
Winner	Loser	Score
Rick Bryant (CAN)	Robert Clark (AUS)	Points
Hukum Singh (IND)	Bert Owen (ENG)	Points
Muhammad Bashir (PAK)	Bert Owen (ENG)	fall
Rick Bryant (CAN)	Hukum Singh (IND)	draw
Muhammad Bashir (PAK)	Rick Bryant (CAN)	Points
Muhammad Bashir (PAK)	Hukum Singh (IND)	Points

Final positions: 1. Bashir 2. Bryant 3. Singh 4. Owen, Bashir, Clark

=== Middleweight 82kg ===
Winner	Loser	Score
Faiz Muhammad (PAK)	Ronald Grinstead (ENG)	Points
Sébastien Donison (CAN)	Michael Benarik (AUS)	Points
Jit Singh (IND)	Ronald Grinstead (ENG)	draw
Faiz Muhammad (PAK)	Sébastien Donison (CAN)	Points
Michael Benarik (AUS)	Ronald Grinstead (ENG)	draw
Faiz Muhammad (PAK)	Jit Singh (IND)	Points
Sébastien Donison (CAN)	Jit Singh (IND)	Points
Faiz Muhammad (PAK)	Michael Benarik (AUS)	Points

Final positions: 1. Faiz 2. Donison 3. Benarik 4. Grinstead 5. Singh

=== Light heavyweight 90kg ===
Winner	Loser	Score
Bishwanath Singh (IND)	M Riaz (PAK)	draw
Wallace Booth (SCO)	Geoff Hill (ENG)	Points
Robert Chamberot (CAN)	M Riaz (PAK)	draw
Bishwanath Singh (IND)	Geoff Hill (ENG)	Points
Wallace Booth (SCO)	M Riaz (PAK)	draw
Robert Chamberot (CAN)	Bishwanath Singh (IND)	draw
Wallace Booth (SCO)	Robert Chamberot (CAN)	draw
Wallace Booth (SCO)	Bishwanath Singh (IND)	draw

Final positions: 1. Chamberot 2. Booth 3. Singh 4. Riaz 5. Hill

=== Heavyweight 100kg ===
Winner	Loser	Score
Ikram Ilahi (PAK)	Denis McNamara (ENG)	Points
Bhim Singh (IND)	Harry Geris (CAN)	Points
Denis McNamara (ENG)	Harry Geris (CAN)	Points
Bhim Singh (IND)	Ikram Ilahi (PAK)	Points

Final positions: 1. Singh 2. Ilahi 3. McNamara 4. Geris
