= Wrestling at the 1964 Summer Olympics – Men's freestyle bantamweight =

Wrestling at the Olympics

Men's freestyle bantamweight at the Games of the XVIII Olympiad
- Venue: Komazawa Gymnasium
- Dates: 11–14 October 1964
- Competitors: 20 from 20 nations

Medalists
1st place, gold medalist(s)		Yojiro Uetake	Japan
2nd place, silver medalist(s)		Hüseyin Akbaş	Turkey
3rd place, bronze medalist(s)		Aydin Ibrahimov	Soviet Union

The men's freestyle bantamweight competition at the 1964 Summer Olympics in Tokyo took place from 11 to 14 October at the Komazawa Gymnasium. Nations were limited to one competitor. Bantamweight was the second-lightest category, including wrestlers weighing 52 to 57 kilograms (114.6 to 125.7 lb).

== Competition format ==
This freestyle wrestling competition continued to use the "bad points" elimination system introduced at the 1928 Summer Olympics for Greco-Roman and at the 1932 Summer Olympics for freestyle wrestling, as adjusted at the 1960 Summer Olympics. Each bout awarded 4 points. If the victory was by fall, the winner received 0 and the loser 4. If the victory was by decision, the winner received 1 and the loser 3. If the bout was tied, each wrestler received 2 points. A wrestler who accumulated 6 or more points was eliminated. Rounds continued until there were 3 or fewer uneliminated wrestlers. If only 1 wrestler remained, he received the gold medal. If 2 wrestlers remained, point totals were ignored and they faced each other for gold and silver (if they had already wrestled each other, that result was used). If 3 wrestlers remained, point totals were ignored and a round-robin was held among those 3 to determine medals (with previous head-to-head results, if any, counting for this round-robin).

== Results ==
=== Round 1 ===
Bouts

Winner	Nation	Victory Type	Loser	Nation
János Varga	Hungary	Fall	Tortillano Tumasis	Philippines
Choi Yeong-gil	South Korea	Fall	Kevin McGrath	Australia
Muhammad Siraj-Din	Pakistan	Decision	Walter Pilling	Great Britain
Yojiro Uetake	Japan	Fall	Karl Dodrimont	United Team of Germany
Hüseyin Akbaş	Turkey	Decision	Mohammad Daoud Anwary	Afghanistan
Abdullah Khodabandeh	Iran	Tie	Mladen Georgiev	Bulgaria
Bishambar Singh	India	Fall	Rubén Leibovich	Argentina
David Auble	United States	Decision	Bazaryn Sükhbaatar	Mongolia
Koji Hirabayashi	Canada	Decision	Pekka Alanen	Finland
Aydin Ibrahimov	Soviet Union	Decision	Moises López	Mexico

Points

Rank	Wrestler	Nation	R1
1	Bishambar Singh	India	0
1	Choi Yeong-gil	South Korea	0
1	Yojiro Uetake	Japan	0
1	János Varga	Hungary	0
5	Hüseyin Akbaş	Turkey	1
5	David Auble	United States	1
5	Koji Hirabayashi	Canada	1
5	Aydin Ibrahimov	Soviet Union	1
5	Muhammad Siraj-Din	Pakistan	1
10	Mladen Georgiev	Bulgaria	2
10	Abdullah Khodabandeh	Iran	2
12	Pekka Alanen	Finland	3
12	Mohammad Daoud Anwary	Afghanistan	3
12	Moisés López	Mexico	3
12	Walter Pilling	Great Britain	3
12	Bazaryn Sükhbaatar	Mongolia	3
17	Karl Dodrimont	United Team of Germany	4
17	Rubén Leibovich	Argentina	4
17	Kevin McGrath	Australia	4
17	Tortillano Tumasis	Philippines	4

=== Round 2 ===
Seven wrestlers had their second loss in as many rounds and were eliminated, leaving 13 to advance. Varga, Choi, and Uetake each had 0 points. There were 2 wrestlers at each other possible point total (1 point through 5 points) remaining. Hirabayashi, however, withdrew after this round.

Bouts

Winner	Nation	Victory Type	Loser	Nation
János Varga	Hungary	Fall	Kevin McGrath	Australia
Choi Yeong-gil	South Korea	Fall	Tortillano Tumasis	Philippines
Yojiro Uetake	Japan	Fall	Walter Pilling	Great Britain
David Auble	United States	Fall	Rubén Leibovich	Argentina
Muhammad Siraj-Din	Pakistan	Decision	Karl Dodrimont	United Team of Germany
Aydin Ibrahimov	Soviet Union	Decision	Koji Hirabayashi	Canada
Abdullah Khodabandeh	Iran	Decision	Mohammad Daoud Anwary	Afghanistan
Hüseyin Akbaş	Turkey	Tie	Mladen Georgiev	Bulgaria
Pekka Alanen	Finland	Tie	Moises López	Mexico
Bishambar Singh	India	Decision	Bazaryn Sükhbaatar	Mongolia

Points

Rank	Wrestler	Nation	R1	R2	Total
1	Choi Yeong-gil	South Korea	0	0	0
1	Yojiro Uetake	Japan	0	0	0
1	János Varga	Hungary	0	0	0
4	David Auble	United States	1	0	1
4	Bishambar Singh	India	0	1	1
6	Aydin Ibrahimov	Soviet Union	1	1	2
6	Muhammad Siraj-Din	Pakistan	1	1	2
8	Hüseyin Akbaş	Turkey	1	2	3
8	Abdullah Khodabandeh	Iran	2	1	3
10	Mladen Georgiev	Bulgaria	2	2	4
11	Pekka Alanen	Finland	3	2	5
11	Moisés López	Mexico	3	2	5
13	Koji Hirabayashi	Canada	1	3	4*
14	Mohammad Daoud Anwary	Afghanistan	3	3	6
14	Bazaryn Sükhbaatar	Mongolia	3	3	6
16	Karl Dodrimont	United Team of Germany	4	3	7
16	Walter Pilling	Great Britain	3	4	7
18	Rubén Leibovich	Argentina	4	4	8
18	Kevin McGrath	Australia	4	4	8
18	Tortillano Tumasis	Philippines	4	4	8

=== Round 3 ===
Four wrestlers were eliminated in this round, with Siraj-Din also withdrawing to leave only 7 men advancing. All three wrestlers who started the round with 0 points picked up at least 1; Choi and Uetake shared the lead with just 1 point. Three wrestlers had 2 points.

Bouts

Winner	Nation	Victory Type	Loser	Nation
Choi Yeong-gil	South Korea	Decision	János Varga	Hungary
Yojiro Uetake	Japan	Decision	Muhammad Siraj-Din	Pakistan
Hüseyin Akbaş	Turkey	Decision	Abdullah Khodabandeh	Iran
David Auble	United States	Decision	Mladen Georgiev	Bulgaria
Bishambar Singh	India	Decision	Moises López	Mexico
Aydin Ibrahimov	Soviet Union	Fall	Pekka Alanen	Finland

Points

Rank	Wrestler	Nation	R1	R2	R3	Total
1	Choi Yeong-gil	South Korea	0	0	1	1
1	Yojiro Uetake	Japan	0	0	1	1
3	David Auble	United States	1	0	1	2
3	Bishambar Singh	India	0	1	1	2
3	Aydin Ibrahimov	Soviet Union	1	1	0	2
6	János Varga	Hungary	0	0	3	3
7	Hüseyin Akbaş	Turkey	1	2	1	4
8	Muhammad Siraj-Din	Pakistan	1	1	3	5*
9	Abdullah Khodabandeh	Iran	2	1	3	6
10	Mladen Georgiev	Bulgaria	2	2	3	7
11	Moisés López	Mexico	3	2	3	8
12	Pekka Alanen	Finland	3	2	4	9

=== Round 4 ===
Varga, who had not had any points after round 2, was the only man eliminated in round 4 after two straight losses. The leaders coming into the round, Uetake and Choi, faced each other with neither in danger of elimination; Uetake won to stay in the lead. He was now joined by Ibrahimov at 2 points, after the latter wrestler had a bye.

Bouts

Winner	Nation	Victory Type	Loser	Nation
Yojiro Uetake	Japan	Decision	Choi Yeong-gil	South Korea
Hüseyin Akbaş	Turkey	Fall	János Varga	Hungary
David Auble	United States	Decision	Bishambar Singh	India
Aydin Ibrahimov	Soviet Union	Bye	N/A	N/A

Points

Rank	Wrestler	Nation	R1	R2	R3	R4	Total
1	Aydin Ibrahimov	Soviet Union	1	1	0	0	2
1	Yojiro Uetake	Japan	0	0	1	1	2
3	David Auble	United States	1	0	1	1	3
4	Hüseyin Akbaş	Turkey	1	2	1	0	4
4	Choi Yeong-gil	South Korea	0	0	1	3	4
6	Bishambar Singh	India	0	1	1	3	5
7	János Varga	Hungary	0	0	3	4	7

=== Round 5 ===
The three losers were all eliminated; the three winners advanced to a final round-robin.

Bouts

Winner	Nation	Victory Type	Loser	Nation
Aydin Ibrahimov	Soviet Union	Decision	Choi Yeong-gil	South Korea
Yojiro Uetake	Japan	Decision	David Auble	United States
Hüseyin Akbaş	Turkey	Decision	Bishambar Singh	India

Points

Rank	Wrestler	Nation	R1	R2	R3	R4	R5	Total
1	Aydin Ibrahimov	Soviet Union	1	1	0	0	1	3
1	Yojiro Uetake	Japan	0	0	1	1	1	3
3	Hüseyin Akbaş	Turkey	1	2	1	0	1	5
4	David Auble	United States	1	0	1	1	3	6
5	Choi Yeong-gil	South Korea	0	0	1	3	3	7
6	Bishambar Singh	India	0	1	1	3	3	8

=== Final round ===
None of the three medalists had faced another yet, so the final round was a full round-robin. In the first bout, Uetake defeated Ibrahimov. In the second, Akbaş also defeated Ibrahimov, giving the latter wrestler the bronze wrestler and setting up a gold medal bout between Uetake and Akbaş. Uetake won to claim Japan's first gold medal in the weight class since 1952.

Bouts

Winner	Nation	Victory Type	Loser	Nation
Yojiro Uetake	Japan	Decision	Aydin Ibrahimov	Soviet Union
Hüseyin Akbaş	Turkey	Decision	Aydin Ibrahimov	Soviet Union
Yojiro Uetake	Japan	Decision	Hüseyin Akbaş	Turkey

Points

Rank	Wrestler	Nation	Points
1st place, gold medalist(s)	Yojiro Uetake	Japan	2
2nd place, silver medalist(s)	Hüseyin Akbaş	Turkey	4
3rd place, bronze medalist(s)	Aydin Ibrahimov	Soviet Union	6
