= Scotland at the 1974 British Commonwealth Games =

- CG code: SCO
- CGA: Commonwealth Games Scotland
- Website: www.teamscotland.scot

in Christchurch, New Zealand
- Medals Ranked 7th: Gold 3 Silver 5 Bronze 11 Total 19

British Commonwealth Games appearances
- 1930; 1934; 1938; 1950; 1954; 1958; 1962; 1966; 1970; 1974; 1978; 1982; 1986; 1990; 1994; 1998; 2002; 2006; 2010; 2014; 2018; 2022; 2026; 2030

Scotland competed at the 1974 British Commonwealth Games in Christchurch, New Zealand, from 25 January to 2 February 1974.

The Scotland team was named on 21 October 1973.

Scotland came 7th overall with 3 golds, 5 silver and 11 bronze medals.

== Medalists ==
=== Gold ===
- David Wilkie (200 m breaststroke)
- David Wilkie (200 m individual medley)
- Men's pairs (Lawn bowls)

=== Silver ===
- Cy Harrison (boxing)
- Colin McEachran (shooting)
- Rosemary Payne (discus throw)
- Kim Wickham (swimming)
- David Wilkie (100 m breaststroke)

=== Bronze ===
- Alister Allan (shooting)
- Maurice Allan (wrestling)
- John Bambrick (boxing)
- Steve Cooney (boxing)
- Sandra Dickie (swimming)
- James Douglas (boxing)
- Ian Duncan (wrestling)
- John McNiven (weightlifting)
- Willie Wood (Lawn bowls)
- Men's fours (Lawn bowls)
- women's 4 × 100 m medley relay (swimming)

== Team ==
=== Athletics ===
Men

Athlete	Events	Club	Medals
Kenneth Atkins	long jump		
Chris Black	hammer throw, discus throw		
Laurie Bryce	hammer throw		
William James Clark	long jump, triple jump		
Don Halliday	100, 200m, 4x100 relay		
David Jenkins	200, 400m, 4x100 relay		
William McCallum	decathlon		
Donald Macgregor	marathon		
Gus McKenzie	110m hurdles 4x100 relay		
David James McMeekin	800m		
Norman Morrison	5,000, 10,000m		
Les Piggot	100, 200m, 4x100 relay		
Ian Stewart	5,000, 10,000m		
Lachie Stewart	10,000m, marathon		
James K. Wright	marathon		

Women

Athlete	Events	Club	Medals
Margaret Coomber	800m, 4x400 relay		
Helen Golden	100, 200m, relay x 2		
Evelyn McMeekin	200m, 400m, 4x400 relay		
Alison MacRitchie	100m, 200m, 4x100 relay		
Myra Nimmo	100m hurdles, long jump, pentathlon, 4x100 relay		
Rosemary Payne	discus throw, shot put		Silver medal
Meg Ritchie	discus throw, shot put		
Christine Salmond	100m		
Mary Stewart	1500m		
Ruth L. Watt	high jump, 4x100 relay		
Rosemary Wright	800m, 4x400 relay		

=== Badminton ===
Men

Athlete	Events	Club	Medals
Jim Ansari	singles, doubles, mixed	Glasgow	
Fraser Gow	singles, doubles, mixed	Alexandria	
Bob McCoig	singles, doubles, mixed	Glasgow Central	
Nicol McCloy	singles, doubles	Greenock	

Women

Athlete	Events	Club	Medals
Joanne Flockhart	singles, doubles, mixed	Newmills	
Helen Kelly	singles, mixed	Edinburgh	
Christine Stewart	singles, doubles, mixed	Whitburn	

=== Boxing ===
Athlete	Events	Club	Medals
John Bambrick	-48kg light-flyweight	Edinburgh Transport ABC	Bronze medal
Steve Cooney	67kg welterweight	St.Francis ABC, Dundee	Bronze medal
Jim Douglas	63.5kg light-welterweight	Camperdown ABC, Dundee	Bronze medal
John Gillan	60kg lightweight	Aberdeen ABC	
Cy Harrison	71kg light-middleweight	Denbeath ABC	Silver medal
John Lawless	51kg flyweight	Grangemouth ABC	
Stewart Ogilvie	54kg bantamweight	Camperdown ABC, Dundee	

=== Cycling ===
Athlete	Events	Club	Medal
John Clark	time trial, indiv & team pursuit	Glasgow	
Alex Gilchrist	road race, time trial, team pursuit	Penicuik	
Alex Gordon	scratch, team pursuit	Glasgow	
William Nickson	road race, scratch, time trial, indiv & team pursuit	Edinburgh	

=== Diving ===
Women

Athlete	Events	Club	Medals
Fiona Joan Hotson	springboard, platform	Edinburgh	

=== Lawn bowls ===
Athlete	Events	Club	Medals
Jack Christie	pairs	Edinburgh Northern BC	Gold medal
John Marshall	fours	Mossley BC	Bronze medal
Alex McIntosh	pairs	Newbattle BC	Gold medal
John McRae	fours	Uddingston BC	Bronze medal
Morgan Moffat	fours	Whitehouse & Grange BC	Bronze medal
Bill Scott	fours	Errol BC	Bronze medal
Willie Wood	singles	Gifford BC	Bronze medal

=== Shooting ===
Men

Athlete	Events	Club	Medals
Alister Allan	rifle prone	Oxford	Bronze medal
William Edgar	rapid fire pistol	Kent	
David Hossack	fullbore rifle	Edinburgh	
Colin McEachran	fullbore rifle	Edinburgh	Silver medal
Robin Macdonald	50m free pistol	London	
Louis Stewart	trap	Inverness	
Brian Weld	50m free pistol	Edinburgh	

=== Swimming ===
Men

Athlete	Events	Club	Medals
James Carter	100 back, 400, 1500 free, 200, 400 medley, 1xrelay	Sydney	
Gordon Downie	100, 200, 400 free, 3xrelay	New York	
Ian Hughes	100, 200m backstroke, medley relay	Eastleigh	
Alan McClatchey	100, 200 butterfly, 100, 200, 400, 1500 free, 3xrelay	Perth ASC	
Wilson Mills	100, 200m freestyle, 2xrelay	Edinburgh	
Alan Thompson	100, 200m breaststroke	Aberdeen	
David Wilkie	100, 200m breaststroke, 200, 400 medley, 2xrelay	Florida	,,

Women

Athlete	Events	Club	Medals
Sandra Dickie	100, 200m breaststroke, relay	Paisley ASC	,
Gillian Fordyce	100, 200m backstroke, relay	Aberdeen	Bronze medal
Jayne Lornie	100, 200m breaststroke, 400 medley		
Morag McGlashan	100 free, relay	Edinburgh	Bronze medal
Louise Ross	100, 200m butterfly	Edinburgh	
Debbie Simpson	100 butterfly, 200, 400, 800 free, 200 medley	Dundee	
Jackie Simpson	100, 200, 400 free, 200 medley	Dundee	
Diane Walker	100, 200, 400, 800 free, 200, 400 medley	Aberdeen	
Kim Wickham	100, 200 butterfly, 100 back, relay	Darlington	,

=== Weightlifting ===
Athlete	Events	Club	Medals
Grant Anderson	+110kg super-heavyweight	Dundee	
Kenneth Holland	90kg middle-heavyweight	Edinburgh	
Jack Hynd	+110kg super-heavyweight	Edinburgh	
John McNiven	52kg flyweight	Glasgow	Bronze medal
Charlie Revolta	52kg flyweight	Edinburgh	
Thomas Yule	90kg middle-heavyweight	Glasgow	

=== Wrestling ===
Athlete	Events	Club	Medals
Maurice Allan	90kg light-heavyweight	Balerno	Bronze medal
Tam Anderson	68kg lightweight	Milngarvie	
Ian Duncan	100kg heavyweight	Edinburgh	Bronze medal
Charles Kelly	82kg middleweight	Dunfermline	
Willie Robertson	+100kg super-heavyweight	Kirkliston	
