= Andy Bailey (wrestler) =

English wrestler

Personal information
- Nationality: British (English)
- Born: England

Sport
- Sport: Wrestling
- Event: Bantamweight

Andrew "Andy" S. Bailey is a former international wrestler from England who competed at the Commonwealth Games.

== Biography ==
Bailey representing Manchester, competed in the bantamweight category at the 1966 European Championships in Karlsruhe, West Germany. Bailey also won the British bantamweight title in 1966 at the British Wrestling Championships.

Bailey represented the England team at the 1966 British Empire and Commonwealth Games in Kingston, Jamaica, where he participated in 57 kg bantamweight category, being out-pointed by Australian Kevin McGrath and Canadian Ernest Chornomydz.

By 1967, Bailey had moved up in weight and won the national YMCA featherweight title in Manchester.
