= Wrestling at the 1962 Asian Games – Men's freestyle 97 kg =

Men's freestyle 97 kg at the 1962 Asian Games
- Venue: Ikada Sports Hall
- Dates: 28–30 August 1962
- Competitors: 5 from 5 nations

Medalists
gold medal	Maruti Mane	India
silver medal	Haruo Takagi	Japan
bronze medal	Muhammad Niaz	Pakistan

The men's freestyle 97 kilograms (light heavyweight) freestyle wrestling competition at the 1962 Asian Games in Jakarta was held from 28 to 30 August 1962.

The competition used a form of negative points tournament, with negative points given for any result short of a fall. Accumulation of 6 negative points eliminated the wrestler. When three or fewer wrestlers remained, they advanced to a final round, with only preliminary results amongst them carried forward.

== Schedule ==
All times are Western Indonesian Time (UTC+07:30)

Date	Time	Event
Tuesday, 28 August 1962	08:00	1st round
Wednesday, 29 August 1962	08:00	2nd round
Wednesday, 29 August 1962	14:30	3rd round
Thursday, 30 August 1962	08:00	4th round

== Results ==
=== 1st round ===
TBM		BM		BM		TBM
0	Maruti Mane (IND)	0	Fall 8:05	4	Ghulam Mohiddin Gunga (AFG)	4
4	Jong Tamnge (INA)	4	Fall 4:04	0	Muhammad Niaz (PAK)	0
0	Haruo Takagi (JPN)				Bye	

=== 2nd round ===
TBM		BM		BM		TBM
2	Haruo Takagi (JPN)	2	Draw	2	Maruti Mane (IND)	2
8	Ghulam Mohiddin Gunga (AFG)	4	Fall 2:14	0	Jong Tamnge (INA)	4
0	Muhammad Niaz (PAK)				Bye	

=== 3rd round ===
TBM		BM		BM		TBM
2	Muhammad Niaz (PAK)	2	Draw	2	Haruo Takagi (JPN)	4
3	Maruti Mane (IND)	1	Decision	3	Jong Tamnge (INA)	7

=== 4th round ===
TBM		BM		BM		TBM
5	Muhammad Niaz (PAK)	3	Decision	1	Maruti Mane (IND)	4
4	Haruo Takagi (JPN)				Bye	

== Final standing ==
Rank	Athlete	Round				TBM	FBM
Rank	Athlete	1	2	3	4	TBM	FBM
1st place, gold medalist(s)	Maruti Mane (IND)	0	2	1	1	4	3
2nd place, silver medalist(s)	Haruo Takagi (JPN)	Bye	2	2	Bye	4	4
3rd place, bronze medalist(s)	Muhammad Niaz (PAK)	0	Bye	2	3	5	5
4	Jong Tamnge (INA)	4	0	3		7	
5	Ghulam Mohiddin Gunga (AFG)	4	4			8	
