= Badminton at the 1974 British Commonwealth Games – Men's singles =

Men's singles at the 1974 British Commonwealth Games
- Venue: Cowles Stadium, Christchurch, New Zealand
- Dates: 24 – 31 January 1974

The badminton men's singles tournament at the 1974 British Commonwealth Games in Christchurch, New Zealand took place from 24 to 31 January 1974 at the Cowles Stadium.

== Results ==
=== Finals ===
Semi-finals
Punch Gunalan (MAL) | 15 | 2 | 15
Derek Talbot (ENG) | 13 | 15 | 11
Jamie Paulson (CAN) | 15 | 15
Paul Whetnall (ENG) | 4 | 0

Gold medal match
Punch Gunalan (MAL) | 15 | 15
Jamie Paulson (CAN) | 1 | 6
Bronze medal match
Derek Talbot (ENG) | w | / | o
Paul Whetnall (ENG)

=== Top half ===
==== Section 1 ====
First round
D Ahuja (IND) | 10 | 17 | 15
R Livingston (NZL) | 15 | 14 | 18
A Jobanputra (TAN) | w | / | o
J Clancy (AUS)
C Bell (NIR) | 15 | 15
S Singh (MAW) | 2 | 2
J McKee (CAN) | 14 | 15 | 12
E Stuart (ENG) | 17 | 9 | 15

Second round
P Gunalan (MAL) | 15 | 15
H Dulloo (MRI) | 2 | 3
N McCloy (SCO) | 15 | 15
S Hassanali (KEN) | 5 | 5
R Livingston (NZL) | 15 | 15
A Jobanputra (TAN) | 3 | 3
C Bell (NIR) | 5 | 8
E Stuart (ENG) | 15 | 15

Third round
P Gunalan (MAL) | 15 | 15
N McCloy (SCO) | 6 | 2
R Livingston (NZL) | 15 | 15
E Stuart (ENG) | 9 | 3

Quarter-finals
P Gunalan (MAL) | 15 | 15
R Livingston (NZL) | 7 | 8

==== Section 2 ====
First round

Second round
D Talbot (ENG) | 15 | 15
F Gow (SCO) | 4 | 3
P Cooper (AUS) | 15 | 7 | 7
W Johns (NZL) | 5 | 15 | 15
P Padukone (IND) | 15 | 15
S Ghulam (KEN) | 1 | 4
D Soong (MAL) | 15 | 9 | 15
G Harris (CAN) | 7 | 15 | 4

Third round
D Talbot (ENG) | 15 | 15
W Johns (NZL) | 1 | 12
P Padukone (IND) | 15 | 15
D Soong (MAL) | 8 | 8

Quarter-finals
D Talbot (ENG) | 15 | 15
P Padukone (IND) | 9 | 6

=== Bottom half ===
==== Section 3 ====
First round

Second round
J Paulson (CAN) | 15 | 15
R McCoig (SCO) | 2 | 7
P Tyrrell (AUS) | 15 | 15
P Modi (KEN) | 4 | 7
M Tredgett (ENG) | 12 | 15 | 5
R Purser (NZL) | 15 | 12 | 15
J Mbelwa (TAN) | 0 | 2
Moo F L (MAL) | 15 | 15

Third round
J Paulson (CAN) | 15 | 15
P Tyrrell (AUS) | 8 | 3
R Purser (NZL) | 15 | 15
Moo F L (MAL) | 6 | 10

Quarter-finals
J Paulson (CAN) | 6 | 15 | 15
R Purser (NZL) | 15 | 10 | 9

==== Section 4 ====
First round
Tan A M (MAL) | 15 | 15
W Macdonnell (CAN) | 10 | 3
A Parpia (IND) | 15 | 15
D Doherty (NIR) | 8 | 2
R Chiplunkar (TAN) | 15 | 15
G Louzado (MAW) | 8 | 8
B Purser (NZL) | 15 | 15
J Ansari (SCO) | 4 | 6

Second round
Tan A M (MAL) | 15 | 0
A Parpia (IND) | 6 | 0^{r}
R Chiplunkar (TAN) | 0 | 3
5 | B Purser (NZL) | 15 | 15
C Hardwick (AUS) | 14 | 9
H Jennings (WAL) | 18 | 15
V Maini (KEN) | 1 | 4
P Whetnall (ENG) | 15 | 15

Third round
Tan A M (MAL) | 15 | 15
B Purser (NZL) | 4 | 3
H Jennings (WAL) | 1 | 0
P Whetnall (ENG) | 15 | 15

Quarter-finals
Tan A M (MAL) | 13 | 15 | 16
P Whetnall (ENG) | 18 | 8 | 18
