= Geoff Hill (wrestler) =

English wrestler

Personal information
- Nationality: British (English)
- Born: England

Sport
- Sport: Wrestling
- Event: Middleweight / light-heavyweight / heavyweight

Geoffrey "Geoff" Hill is a former international wrestler from England who competed at the Commonwealth Games.

== Biography ==
In 1965, Hill was wrestling at middleweight and represented Great Britain at the world championships.

Hill then represented the England team at the 1966 British Empire and Commonwealth Games in Kingston, Jamaica, where he participated in 90 kg light-heavyweight category, being out-pointed by Scotsman Wallace Booth and Bishwanath Singh from India.

Hill progressed to heavyweight and was a four-times British champion at the British Wrestling Championships, winning the middleweight title in 1965, the light-heavweight title in 1966 and the heavyweight title in 1969 and 1970.
