= Wrestling at the 1962 Asian Games – Men's Greco-Roman 97 kg =

Men's Greco-Roman 97 kg at the 1962 Asian Games
- Venue: Ikada Sports Hall
- Dates: 25–27 August 1962
- Competitors: 4 from 4 nations

Medalists
| gold medal | Muhammad Niaz | Pakistan |
| silver medal | Haruo Takagi | Japan |
| silver medal | Maruti Mane | India |

The men's Greco-Roman 97 kilograms (light heavyweight) Greco-Roman wrestling competition at the 1962 Asian Games in Jakarta was held from 25 to 27 August 1962.

The competition used a form of negative points tournament, with negative points given for any result short of a fall. Accumulation of 6 negative points eliminated the wrestler. When three or fewer wrestlers remained, they advanced to a final round, with only preliminary results amongst them carried forward.

== Schedule ==
All times are Western Indonesian Time (UTC+07:30)

| Date | Time | Event |
|---|---|---|
| Saturday, 25 August 1962 | 08:00 | 1st round |
| Sunday, 26 August 1962 | 08:00 | 2nd round |
| Monday, 27 August 1962 | 08:00 | 3rd round |

== Results ==
=== 1st round ===
| TBM | | BM | | BM | | TBM |
|---|---|---|---|---|---|---|
| 4 | Jong Tamnge (INA) | 4 | Fall 2:45 | 0 | Haruo Takagi (JPN) | 0 |
| 2 | Muhammad Niaz (PAK) | 2 | Draw | 2 | Maruti Mane (IND) | 2 |

=== 2nd round ===
| TBM | | BM | | BM | | TBM |
|---|---|---|---|---|---|---|
| 8 | Jong Tamnge (INA) | 4 | Fall 4:21 | 0 | Muhammad Niaz (PAK) | 2 |
| 2 | Haruo Takagi (JPN) | 2 | Draw | 2 | Maruti Mane (IND) | 4 |

=== 3rd round ===
| TBM | | BM | | BM | | TBM |
|---|---|---|---|---|---|---|
| 4 | Haruo Takagi (JPN) | 2 | Draw | 2 | Muhammad Niaz (PAK) | 4 |
| 4 | Maruti Mane (IND) | | | | Bye | |

== Final standing ==
| Rank | Athlete | Round | | | TBM | FBM |
| Rank | Athlete | 1 | 2 | 3 | TBM | FBM |
|---|---|---|---|---|---|---|
| 1st place, gold medalist(s) | Muhammad Niaz (PAK) | 2 | 0 | 2 | 4 | 4 (Note: Tied on total bad marks. The athletes' body weights were used as the tiebreaker. (Takagi and Mane scaled even)) |
| 2nd place, silver medalist(s) | Haruo Takagi (JPN) | 0 | 2 | 2 | 4 | 4 |
| 2nd place, silver medalist(s) | Maruti Mane (IND) | 2 | 2 | Bye | 4 | 4 |
| 4 | Jong Tamnge (INA) | 4 | 4 | | 8 | |
