= 1975 World Sambo Championships =

Sambo competitions

- Venue: Minsk Sports Palace
- Location: (Soviet Union) Minsk, Belarus
- Dates: September 19–21
- Competitors: 69 participants from 12 countries

The 1975 World Sambo Championships were held in Minsk, Belarus on September 6–11. It was the third World Sambo Championships.

== Medal overview ==
men	Gold	Silver	Bronze
-48kg	(Soviet Union) Sayfuddin Hodiyev (URS)	(Mongolia) [[]] (IRN)	(Bulgaria) [[]] (BUL)
-52kg	(Soviet Union) [[]] (URS)^{RUS}	(Mongolia) [[]] (MGL)	(South Korea) Jung God Kim (KOR)
-57kg	(Soviet Union) Mikhail Mikhailovich (URS)^{RUS}	(Bulgaria) Parvan Parvanov (BUL)	(Bulgaria) (BUL) Stoyko Malov
-62kg	(Soviet Union) [[]] (URS)^{RUS}	(Mongolia) [[]] (MGL)	Takashi Tanoue; Japan
-68kg	(Mongolia) [[]] (MGL)	(Soviet Union) [[]] (URS)^{RUS}	(Bulgaria) [[]] (BUL)
-74kg	(Soviet Union) [[]] (URS)^{RUS}	(Mongolia) [[]] (MGL)	(Spain) José Antonio Cecchini (ESP)
-82kg	(Soviet Union) Česlovas Jezerskas (URS)	(Bulgaria) [[]] (BUL)	(United States) [[]] (USA)
-90kg	(United Kingdom) Maurice Allan (GBR)	(Soviet Union) Nikolay Kardopolov (URS)	(Bulgaria) (BUL)
-100kg	(Mongolia) [[]] (MGL)	(Mongolia) Khorloogiin Bayanmönkh (MGL)	(Bulgaria) [[]] (BUL)
+100kg	(Soviet Union) Vitali Kuznetsov (URS)^{RUS}	(Bulgaria) Nikola Dinev (BUL)	(Bulgaria) [[]] (BUL)

== Medals ==
1	Soviet Union	8	2	0	10
2	Mongolia	1	4	1	6
3	Bulgaria	0	3	6	9
4	United Kingdom	1	0	0	1
5	Japan	0	1	1	2
6	United States	0	0	1	1
7	Spain	0	0	1	1
Всего		10	10	10	30

== Team ranking ==
Rank	Team	Points
1	Soviet Union	58
2	Bulgaria	41
3	Mongolia	38
4	Japan	24
5	Spain	18
6	United Kingdom	10
7	United States	9
