= Willie Robertson (wrestler) =

Scottish wrestler (1941–2023)

Personal information
- Nationality: British (Scottish)
- Born: 28 October 1947 Sanquhar, Scotland
- Died: 14 June 2019 (aged 71) Scotland

Sport
- Sport: Wrestling / Judo / Hammer throw
- Event: Heavyweight / Super-heavyweight
- Club: Milton Wrestling Club (wrestling) Meadowbank Club (wrestling); Field Events Club (athletics); Edinburgh A.C. (athletics)

William "Willie" Robertson (28 October 1947 – 14 June 2019) was an international wrestler, hammer thrower and judoka from Scotland who competed at two Commonwealth Games.

== Biography ==
Robertson was educated in Kirkliston and Winchburgh schools and studied at the Edinburgh School of Building, completing a stonemasonry apprenticeship. He earned national caps with Scotland and won medals at the Scottish Championships in the hammer throw, played rugby as a prop forward for Corstorphine and Highland and was a successful judoka, winning the Scottish heavyweight championships and trained out of the Whitburn Judo Club.

However, it was at wrestling that he excelled and he represented the Scottish team at the 1974 British Commonwealth Games in Christchurch, New Zealand in the +100kg super-heavyweight category.

In 1975, he turned professional and competed at the Highland games but was reinstated as an amateur in 1983 and wrestled for the Meadowbank Club.

In 1986 he went to his second Commonwealth Games, when representing the Scottish team at the 1986 Commonwealth Games in Edinburgh in the heavyweight 100kg category. At the time of the Games he was a lecturer in stonemasonry at Telford College in Edinburgh and lived in Torphichen.

Robertson won three British titles in total at the British Wrestling Championships (1971, 1972 and 1973).

After retiring he coached athletics at the Falkirk Victoria Harriers. He died in 2019.
