= Mohon Lal Ghosh =

Indian weightlifter (born 1944)

Personal information
- Nationality: Indian
- Born: 21 June 1944 (age 82) Bengal, British India

Sport
- Sport: Weightlifting
Medal record
Representing India
British Empire and Commonwealth Games
Silver medal – second place	1966 Kngston	60 kg

Mohon Lal Ghosh (born 21 June 1944) is an Indian weightlifter. He competed at the 1964 Summer Olympics and the 1968 Summer Olympics. He was conferred with the Arjuna Award in the year 1966 by the Government of India.
