= Athletics at the 1966 British Empire and Commonwealth Games – Men's hammer throw =

Men's hammer throw at the 1966 British Empire and Commonwealth Games
- Venue: Independence Park, Kingston
- Dates: August 13, 1966

Medalists
gold medal	Howard Payne	England
silver medal	Praveen Kumar	India
bronze medal	Muhammad Iqbal	Pakistan

The men's hammer throw event at the 1966 British Empire and Commonwealth Games was held on 13 August at the Independence Park in Kingston, Jamaica.

== Results ==
Final results
Rank	Name	Nationality	Distance	Notes
1st place, gold medalist(s)	Howard Payne	England	203 ft 4 in (61.98 m)	
2nd place, silver medalist(s)	Praveen Kumar	India	197 ft 3 in (60.13 m)	
3rd place, bronze medalist(s)	Muhammad Iqbal	Pakistan	195 ft 5 in (59.57 m)	
4	Dick Leffler	Australia	190 ft 5 in (58.05 m)	
5	Laurie Bryce	Scotland	189 ft 5 in (57.74 m)	
6	Peter Seddon	England	188 ft 7 in (57.49 m)	
7	Toror Kipruto	Kenya	153 ft 3 in (46.72 m)	
