= Maharashtra Kesari =

Wrestling championship in Maharashtra, India

Tournament information
- Sport: Indian-style wrestling
- Location: Maharashtra, India
- Established: 1854; 172 years ago 1961(Current Format)
- Website: Official Website

Current champion
- Harshvardhan Sadgir (2026)

Maharashtra Kesari (transl. "Lion of Maharashtra" in Sanskrit) is an Indian-style wrestling championship, established in 1854 in Maharashtra, India. It is organized by the Maharashtra Kustigir Parishad.

== Prize ==
Cash prize was awarded to the winner since the start. But since 1982, initiated by wrestler Mamasaheb Mohol, the winner was permanently awarded with a silver mace weighing 1.5 kilograms (3.3 lb). As of 2008 the winner received a silver mace and a cash prize of ₹51,000 (US$530). In addition, Government of Maharashtra also provided honorary sum amount to the title holders above age 50. Until 2012, to be eligible for this amount, the title holder's annual income had to be less than₹40,000 (US$420). In 2015, the cash prize was raised to ₹1 lakh (US$1,000).

The winners are also eligible to apply for government jobs under sports quota.

== Records ==
Maharashtra Kesari is a wrestling competition in the state of Maharashtra . This competition started in the year 1961. After India gained independence, the first Maharashtra Champion competition was held in 1953. At that time, the famous wrestler Tukaram Nanasaheb Phalke of Nagarkar Talmi in Pune defeated Gogachach Siddhapa, a big wrestler from Mumbai mill workers, in just two minutes on the Joli Insa. Tukaram Phalke was awarded the Maharashtra Champion (Kesari) trophy.

=== Maharashtra Kesari 1961- present ===
Maharashtra State Kustigir Parishad, established by Wrestling Maharshi Mamasaheb Mohol, has been organizing the highest level 'Maharashtra Kesari' wrestling competition in the state for the last six-seven decades. The aim of this competition is to make wrestling evolve, to make good wrestlers out of the region and help them shine at the country and world level. Maharashtra Kesari is being held in the clay and matt divisions. In this, the winner wrestler from the clay division open category and the winner wrestler from the mattress division open category will fight the final on Matt as per international standards, and the winner of this final fight is declared as 'Maharashtra Kesari' and the honorary mace of Maharashtra Kesari is awarded.

== Winners ==
Key

Symbol	Meaning
†	Indicates that the wrestler has won the title multiple times

Year	Winner		Runner-up		Venue	Ref.
1953	Tukaram Nana Phalke				Pune	
1955	Cancelled				Mumbai	
1959	Record not available				Solapur	
1960	No Result				Nagpur	
1961	Dinkar Patil (Dahyarikar)	Dahyari, Sangli-Kolhapur	Hanmant Mane / Biraju Yadav?		Aurangabad	
1962	Bhagwan More	Sangli	Sadashiv Takmoge		Dhule	
1963	Cancelled				Satara	
1964	Ganpatrao Khedkar †	June Khed, Sangli-Kolhapur	Biraju Yadav		Amravati	
1965	Ganpatrao Khedkar †	June Khed, Sangli-Kolhapur	Mohan Bhise		Nashik	
1966	Deenanath Singh	Varanasi-Kolhapur	Chamba Mutnal		Jalgaon	
1967	Chamba Mutnal †	Kolhapur-Karnataka	Dada Mane		Khamgaon, Buldhana	
1968	Chamba Mutnal †	Kolhapur	Parasram Patil		Ahmednagar	
1969	Harishchandra Birajdar	Osmanabad-Latur	Dadu Chougule		Latur	
1970	Dadu Chougule †	Kolhapur	Parasram Patil		Pune	
1971	Dadu Chougule †	Kolhapur	Sahebrao Jadhav		Alibag, Raigad	
1972	Laxman Wadar †	Kerle, Kolhapur	Mohan Bhise		Kolhapur	
1973	Laxman Wadar †	Kerle, Kolhapur	Raghunath Pawar		Akola	
1974	Yuvraj Patil	Koparde, Kolhapur	Raghunath Pawar		Thane	
1975	Raghunath Pawar	Pune	Agnel Negro		Chandrapur	
1976	Hiraman Bankar ^{[Note 1]}	Chimbali, Pune	Shivaji Pachpute		Akluj, Solapur	
1977	No result				Chalisgaon, Jalgaon	
1978	Appasaheb Kadam	Sangli	Shivaji Pachpute		Mumbai	
1979	Shivaji Pachpute	Mumbai	Madar Nabab		Nashik	
1980	Ismail Shaikh	Solapur	Ramesh Takawale, Hargude		Khopoli, Raigad	
1981	Bapurao Lokhande (ढवळ)	Satara	Saradar Khushahal		Nagpur	
1982	Sambhaji Patil	Asgaon, Kolhapur	Saradar Khushahal		Beed	
1983	Saradar Khushahal	Indore-Kolhapur	Vishnu Bhandari		Pune	
1984	Ramkisan Lokhande	Dharur, Beed	Shankar Todkar		Dadar, Mumbai	
1985	Vishnu Joshilkar	Kolhapur	Rama Mane		Pimpri-Chinchwad, Pune	
1986	Gulab Barde	Rahuri, Ahmednagar	Dilip Pawar		Solapur	
1987	Tanaji Bankar	Solapur	Pirmohmmad Attar / Dilip Pawar ?		Nagpur	
1988	Raosaheb Magar	Nimgaon M, Solapur	Bala Rafi	Puluj	Ahmednagar	
1989	No result				Wardha	
1990	No result				Kolhapur	
1991	No result				Amravti	
1992	Apaalal Sheikh	Boramani, Solapur- Kolhapur	Maula Shaikh / Sanjay Patil ?	Akkalkot, Solapur	Pune	
1993	Udayraj Yadav	Boramani, Solapur- Mumbai	Balu Padgham		Balewadi, Pune	
1994	Sanjay Patil	Karad, Satara- Mumbai	Maula Shaikh		Akola	
1995	Shivaji Kekan	Beed	Saheb Solanke / Raju Lonari ?		Nashik	
1996	Cancelled					
1997	Ashok Shirke	Ahmednagar	Balu Padgham		Deoli, Wardha	
1998	Gorakhnath Sarak	Satara	Maula Shaikh		Nagpur	
1999	Dhanaji Phadtare	Satara	Anil Ashruba Raut / Raju Barguje ?	Beed	Pune	
2000	Vinod Dadu Chougule	Kolhapur	Rahul Kalbhor		Khamgaon, Buldhana	
2001	Rahul Kalbhor	Pune	Dattatray Gaikwad		Nanded	
2002	Munnalal Shaikh	Solapur-Mumbai	Chandrakant Sul	Solapur	Jalna	
2003	Dattatray Gaikwad	Pune	Bharat Mekale		Yavatmal	
2004	Chandrahas Nimgire	Jeur, Solapur	Ravi Patil		Vashi	
2005	Sayeed (Ali Kardoos) Chaus	Beed	Asab Ahmed		Indapur, Pune	
2006	Amol Buchade	Pune-Mumbai	Aba Sul		Baramati, Pune	
2007	Chandrahar Patil †	Sangli	Atul Patil		Aurangabad	
2008	Chandrahar Patil †	Sangli	Sandeep Barguje		Kadegaon, Sangli	
2009	Vijay (Vicky) Bankar ^{[Note 1]}	Sangli-Pune	Sayeed (Ali Kardoos) Chaus		Sangavi, Pune	
2010	Samadhan Ghodke	Solapur	Nandkumar Abdaar		Roha, Raigad	
2011	Narsing Yadav †	Mumbai	Atul Patil		Akluj, Solapur	
2012	Narsing Yadav †	Mumbai	Vijay Choudhary	Jalgaon	Gondia	
2013	Narsing Yadav †	Mumbai	Sunil Salunke	Mumbai	Bhosari, Pune	
2014	Vijay Chaudhary †	Jalgaon	Sachin Yelbar		Ahmednagar	
2015	Vijay Chaudhary †	Jalgaon	Vikrant Jadhav	Mumbai	Nagpur	
2016	Vijay Chaudhary†	Jalgaon	Abhijit Katake	Pune	Warje, Pune	
2017	Abhijit Katake	Pune	Kiran Bhagat	Satara	Bhugaon, Pune	
2018	Bala Rafiq Shaikh	Pune	Abhijit Katake	Pune	Jalna	
2019	Harshad Sadgir †	Nashik	Shailesh Shelke	Latur	Balewadi, Pune	
2020	Cancelled					
2021–22	Pruthviraj Patil	Kolhapur	Vishal (Prakash) Bankar	Solapur	Satara	
2022–23	Shivraj Rakshe †	Nanded	Mahendra Gaikwad	Pune		
2023–24	Sikander Shaikh	Mohol, Solapur	Shivraj Rakshe	Pune		
2024	Shivraj Rakshe †	Pune	Harshad Sadgir	Nashik	Osmanabad	
2025	Pruthviraj Mohol	Pune	Mahendra Gaikwad	Solapur		
2026	Harshad Sadgir †	Nashik	Mahendra Gaikwad	Solapur	Wagholi,Pune	

Other Title holders from Maharashtra

Hind Kesari

Year	Winner		Runner-up		Venue	Ref.
1959	Shripati Khanchnale	Kolhapur	Banta Sing (Punjab Kesari)		Delhi	
1960	Ganpatrao Andhalkar	Kolhapur	Khadak Singh		Mumbai	
1964	Maruti Mane	Kavathe Pirhan, Sangli	Mehruddin		Karnal, Haryana	
1966	Hazrat Patel	Achegaon, Solapur			Ahmedabad	
1969	Harishchandra Birajdar	Nilanga, Latur	Jharkhand Rai		Kanpur	
1971	Deenanath Singh	Kolhapur	Lal Bahadur Singh	Bihar	Nagpur	
1975	Chamba Mutnal	Kolhapur			Bengaluru	
2003	Vinod Dadu Chougule	Kolhapur	Suresh Nad		Nashik	
2005	Yogesh Dodke	Pune	Pravin Kumar	Haryana	Ahmednagar	
2013	Amol Barate	Pune	Sonu Kumar	Air Force	Bivani, Haryana	
2014	Santosh Vetal	Karad	DevendraKumar		Haryana	
2015	Sunil Salunkhe	Sangola, Solapur	Hitesh Kumar	Punjab	Jamkhandi, Karnataka	
2023	Abhijit Katake	Pune	Somveer	Harayana	Hyderabad	

Rustam-e-Hind

Year	Winner		Runner-up		Venue	Ref.
	Vishnupant Nagrale					
1972	Harishchandra Birajdar	Nilanga, Latur	Netrapal Singh	Army-Delhi	Varanasi	
1973	Dadu Chougule	Kolhapur			Mumbai	
2010	Amol Buchade	Pune	Kamaljeet	Punjab	Punjab	
2018	Asab Ahmed	Indapur, Pune				
2024	Sikandar Shaikh	Mohol, Solapur	Bagga Kohli	Punjab	Punjab	

Olympics

Khashaba Jadhav – Bronze 🥉 Bantamweight 1952 Summer Olympics

National Awards

Arjuna Award

1963-Ganpatrao Andhalkar
1998-Kakasaheb Pawar
2000-Khashaba Jadhav posthumously
2012-Narsingh Yadav
2020-Rahul Aware

Dhyanchand Award

2005-Maruti Mane
2006-Harishchandra Birajdar
2018-Dadu Chougule

== Notes ==
^{^[Note 1]}Hiraman Bankar is father of Vijay Bankar. Dadu Chaugule is father of Vinod Chaughule.
