= Nicolae Cristea (wrestler) =

Romanian wrestler

Personal information
- Nationality: Romanian
- Born: 11 October 1942 (age 83)

Sport
- Sport: Wrestling

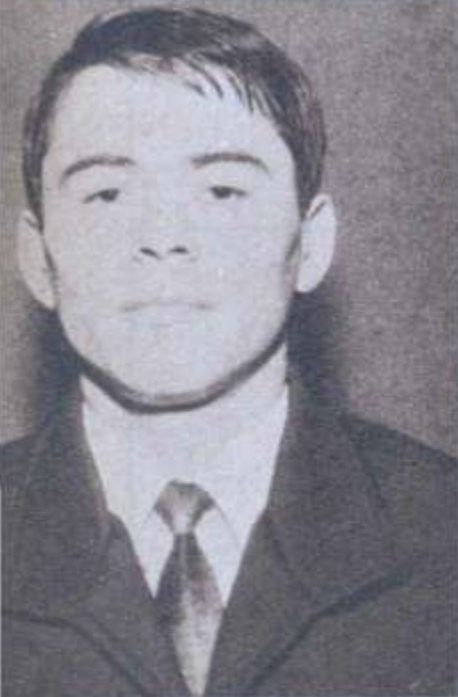
Cristea in 1968

Nicolae Cristea (born 11 October 1942) is a Romanian wrestler. He competed in the men's freestyle 57 kg at the 1968 Summer Olympics.
