= David Auble =

American wrestler (born 1938)

Personal information
- Born: March 13, 1938 (age 88) Ithaca, New York, U.S.

Sport
- Country: United States
- Sport: Wrestling
- Events: Freestyle and Folkstyle
- College team: Cornell
- Club: New York Athletic Club
- Team: USA
Medal record
Collegiate Wrestling
Representing the Cornell Big Red
NCAA Championships
Gold medal – first place	1959 Iowa City	123 lb
Gold medal – first place	1960 College Park	123 lb

David Auble (born March 13, 1938) is an American wrestler.

== Competitive career ==
He was a two-time NCAA wrestling national champion at Cornell University and a member of the Quill and Dagger society. He competed in the men's freestyle bantamweight division at the 1964 Summer Olympics.

== Coaching career ==
Auble has served as head wrestling coach at UCLA in California and Campbell University in North Carolina. In 2010, Auble was inducted into the National Wrestling Hall of Fame as a Distinguished Member.
