= Hasan Sevinç =

Turkish wrestler (1933–2012)

Personal information
- Nationality: Turkish
- Born: 1933 Zile, Turkey
- Died: 15 November 2012 (aged 78–79) Tokat, Turkey

Sport
- Sport: Wrestling

Hasan Sevinç (1933 – 15 November 2012) was a Turkish wrestler. He competed in the men's freestyle 57 kg at the 1968 Summer Olympics. Sevinç died in Tokat on 15 November 2012.
