= Donald Behm =

American wrestler, coach (b. 1945)

Personal information
- Full name: Donald Ray Behm
- Born: February 13, 1945 (age 81) Vancouver, Washington, U.S.
- Home town: New Trier, Illinois, U.S.

Sport
- Country: United States
- Sport: Wrestling
- Events: Freestyle and Folkstyle
- College team: Michigan State
- Club: Mayor Daley Youth Foundation
- Team: USA
Medal record
Men's freestyle wrestling
Representing the United States
Olympic Games
Silver medal – second place	1968 Mexico City	57 kg
World Championships
Silver medal – second place	1969 Mar del Plata	57 kg
Silver medal – second place	1971 Sofia	57 kg
Pan American Games
Gold medal – first place	1971 Cali	57 kg
Collegiate Wrestling
Representing the Michigan State Spartans
NCAA Division I Championships
Silver medal – second place	1967 Kent	130 lb
Bronze medal – third place	1965 Laramie	130 lb
Big Ten Championships
Gold medal – first place	1965 Ann Arbor	130 lb
Gold medal – first place	1967 Columbus	130 lb
Silver medal – second place	1966 Champaign	123 lb

Donald Ray "Don" Behm (born February 13, 1945) is an American wrestler and coach. He was Olympic silver medalist in freestyle wrestling in 1968.

== Wrestling career ==
Behm's high school career, in which he was a two time undefeated Illinois state champion, granted him the opportunity to wrestle for Michigan State University. During his collegiate career, Behm became a two-time All-American, a two-time Big Ten champion, and a three-time Midlands champion.

In his post-collegiate freestyle career, Behm's success continued nationally and internationally. In AAU and USWF tournaments between 1969 and 1973, he won five national championships, received All-American honors 11 times, and was twice named Outstanding Wrestler.

Representing the United States in the 1968 Olympic games, Behm earned a silver medal in the first and only "no match final" in the history of the sport. In 1970, he was the first American to capture a gold medal at the Tbilisi tournament, wrestling seven nine-minute matches in one day.

- 1968 Silver Medal 1968 Summer Olympics 57 kg
- 1969 Silver Medal World Championships 57 kg
- 1970 Gold Medal Tbilisi Tournament 57 kg
- 1971 Gold Medal Pan American Games 57 kg
- 1971 Silver Medal World Championships 57 kg
- 1993 Gold Medal Veterans World Championships
- The America to penalty out a Russian competitor in the Olympics.

Don Behm is a member of the Illinois Athletic Hall of Fame, and a charter member of the Midlands Hall of Fame. In 2004, he was inducted as a Distinguished Member into the National Wrestling Hall of Fame and Museum in Stillwater, Oklahoma, and in 2007 he was inducted into the Greater Lansing Area Sports Hall of Fame. In 2016, he was also inducted into the Michigan State University Athletics Hall of Fame. He is only the second wrestler at MSU to be included in the Athletics Hall of Fame.
