= Simeon Šutev =

Yugoslav wrestler (1942–2015)

Personal information
- Nationality: Yugoslav
- Born: 21 November 1942 Štip, Yugoslavia
- Died: 8 August 2015 (aged 72)

Sport
- Sport: Wrestling

Simeon Šutev (21 November 1942 – 8 August 2015) was a Yugoslav wrestler. He competed in the men's freestyle 57 kg at the 1968 Summer Olympics.
