= Aydin Ibrahimov =

Soviet wrestler (1938–2021)

Medal record

Men's freestyle wrestling

Representing the Soviet Union

Olympic Games
Bronze medal – third place	1964 Tokyo	57 kg

World Championships
Gold medal – first place	1963 Sofia	57 kg

European Championships
Gold medal – first place	1966 Karlsruhe	57 kg

Aydin Ali oglu Ibrahimov (Azerbaijani: Aydın Əli oğlu İbrahimov; 17 September 1938 – 2 September 2021) was a Soviet freestyle wrestler.

== Biography ==
He competed for the Soviet Union at the 1964 Summer Olympics.

Ibrahimov died of COVID-19 on 2 September 2021, in Baku.
