= Alf Rhodes =

English wrestler

Personal information
- Nationality: British (English)
- Born: England

Sport
- Sport: Wrestling
- Event: Flyweight

Alfred "Alf" R. Rhodes is a former international wrestler from England who competed at the Commonwealth Games.

== Biography ==
Rhodes was selected by Great Britain for the 1963 international match against France.

He represented the England team at the 1966 British Empire and Commonwealth Games in Kingston, Jamaica, where he participated in 52 kg flyweight category being pinned by Peter Michienzi of Canada and then out-pointed by Shamrao Sable from India.

Rhodes was a four-times British flyweight champion at the British Wrestling Championships in 1962, 1966, 1967 and 1968.
