= Chang Kyung-mu =

South Korean wrestler (born 1944)

Personal information
- Nationality: South Korean
- Born: 4 December 1944 (age 81)

Sport
- Sport: Wrestling

Chang Kyung-mu (born 4 December 1944) is a South Korean wrestler. He competed in the men's freestyle 57 kg at the 1968 Summer Olympics.
