= Choi Young-kil =

South Korean wrestler (born 1942)

Personal information
- Nationality: South Korean
- Born: 6 March 1942 (age 84)

Sport
- Sport: Wrestling

Choi Young-kil (born 6 March 1942) is a South Korean wrestler. He competed in the men's freestyle bantamweight at the 1964 Summer Olympics.
