= Abdollah Khodabandeh =

Iranian wrestler (1936–2019)

Personal information
- Nationality: Iranian
- Born: 28 August 1936
- Died: 18 December 2019 (aged 83) Tehran, Iran

Sport
- Sport: Wrestling

Abdollah Khodabandeh (Persian: عبدالله خدابنده, 28 August 1936 – 18 December 2019) was an Iranian wrestler. He competed in the men's freestyle bantamweight at the 1964 Summer Olympics.
