= Athletics at the 1974 British Commonwealth Games – Men's triple jump =

Men's triple jump at the 1974 British Commonwealth Games
- Venue: Queen Elizabeth II Park
- Dates: 31 January and 2 February

Medalists
gold medal	Joshua Owusu	Ghana
silver medal	Mohinder Singh Gill	India
bronze medal	Moise Pomaney	Ghana

The men's triple jump event at the 1974 British Commonwealth Games was held on 31 January and 2 February at the Queen Elizabeth II Park in Christchurch, New Zealand.

== Medallists ==
Medal winners
Gold	Silver	Bronze
Joshua Owusu; Ghana	Mohinder Singh Gill; India	Moise Pomaney; Ghana

== Results ==
=== Qualification ===
Held on 31 January.

Rank	Name	Nationality	Result	Notes
	Don Commons	Australia	15.49	
	Phil May	Australia	15.20	
13	Tuariki Delamere	New Zealand	14.23	
14	Mick McGrath	Australia	14.15	
15	Lanyumi Sumuni	Tanzania	14.08	
16	Yesaya Mhango	Malawi	13.67	
	Sakaraia Tuva	Fiji	NM	

=== Final ===
Held on 2 February.

Final result
Rank	Name	Nationality	Result	Notes
1st place, gold medalist(s)	Joshua Owusu	Ghana	16.50	
2nd place, silver medalist(s)	Mohinder Singh Gill	India	16.44	
3rd place, bronze medalist(s)	Moise Pomaney	Ghana	16.23	
4	Johnson Amoah	Ghana	15.63	
5	Phil May	Australia	15.63	
6	Dave Norris	New Zealand	15.41	
7	Don Commons	Australia	15.35	
8	Johnson Mogusu	Kenya	15.29	
9	Gerald Swan	Bermuda	15.19	
10	Alan Lerwill	England	15.08	
11	William Clark	Scotland	14.86	
12	Mike Sharpe	Bermuda	14.86	
