= Mladen Georgiev =

Bulgarian wrestler

Personal information
- Native name: Младен Георгиев Георгиев
- Nationality: Bulgarian
- Born: 16 October 1940 Voynikovo, Dobrich, Bulgaria
- Died: May 22, 2003 (aged 62)
- Height: 160 cm (5 ft 3 in)

Sport
- Sport: Wrestling
Medal record
World Championships
Bronze medal – third place	1963 Sofia	57 kg
European Championships
Silver medal – second place	1967 Istanbul	63 kg

Mladen Georgiev (16 October 1940 – 22 May 2003) was a Bulgarian wrestler. He competed in the men's freestyle bantamweight at the 1964 Summer Olympics.
