= Koji Hirabayashi =

Canadian wrestler

Personal information
- Nationality: Canadian
- Born: 5 January 1942 (age 84)

Sport
- Sport: Wrestling

Koji Hirabayashi (born 5 January 1942) is a Canadian wrestler. He competed in the men's freestyle bantamweight at the 1964 Summer Olympics.
