= Athletics at the 1970 British Commonwealth Games – Men's hammer throw =

Men's hammer throw at the 1970 British Commonwealth Games
- Venue: Meadowbank Stadium, Edinburgh
- Dates: 18 July 1970

Medalists
gold medal	Howard Payne	England
silver medal	Bruce Fraser	England
bronze medal	Barry Williams	England

The men's hammer throw event at the 1970 British Commonwealth Games was held on 18 July at the Meadowbank Stadium in Edinburgh, Scotland.

== Results ==
Final results
Rank	Name	Nationality	Distance	Notes
1st place, gold medalist(s)	Howard Payne	England	67.80	
2nd place, silver medalist(s)	Bruce Fraser	England	62.90	
3rd place, bronze medalist(s)	Barry Williams	England	61.58	
4	Laurie Bryce	Scotland	61.42	
5	Praveen Kumar	India	60.34	
6	Warwick Nicholl	New Zealand	60.02	
7	Gary Salmond	Canada	59.94	
8	Mike Cairns	Canada	59.34	
9	Anthony Tenisci	Canada	57.06	
10	Niall McDonald	Scotland	55.94	
11	Yovan Ochola	Uganda	48.74	
	Morris Davies	Wales	NM	
