= Vijay Chaudhary =

Indian wrestler (born 1988)

pai.Vijay Nathu Chaudhary
- पै.विजय नथु चौधरी
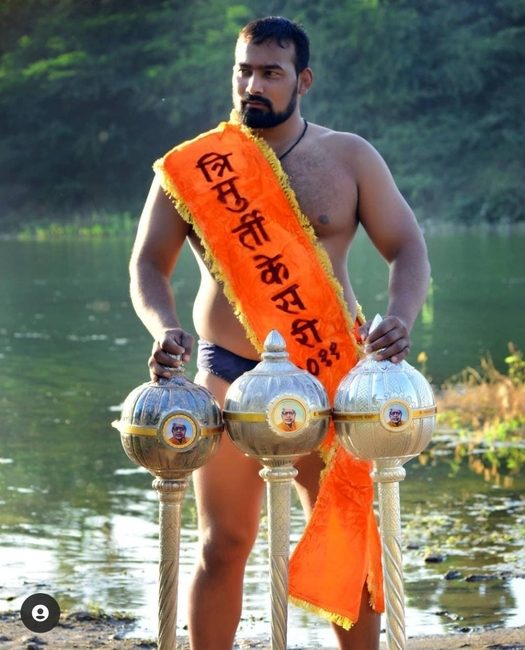
- Born: 23 April 1988 (age 38); Jalgaon, Maharashtra, India
- Occupation: Wrestler Maharashtra Police superintendent
- Spouse: Komal Vijay Chaudhary
- Children: 1

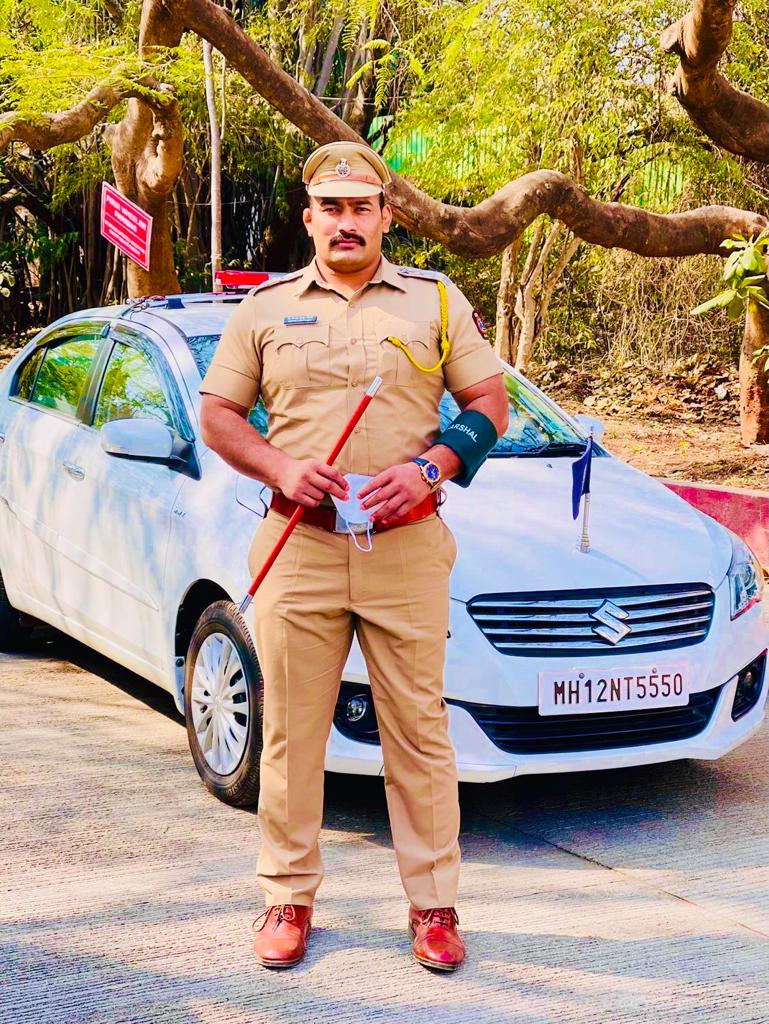
ACP Vijay Nathu Chaudhary

ACP Vijay Chaudhary is an Indian wrestler and three-time winner of the most prestigious Maharashtra Kesari title. He won this award thrice in a row 2014, 2015, and 2016, becoming only the second wrestler to achieve this feat after Narsing Yadav. He also led the Puneri Paltan in to victory in the star studded Inaugural Season of Zee Maharashtra Kusti League in 2019.

On 3 May 2017, the Maharashtra government appointed Vijay Chaudhary as the Deputy Superintendent of Police, being the only sportsperson for the 2017 batch. He is involved in variety of social activities in the state of Maharashtra and more specifically for the upliftment of people from rural areas. He is currently working as the Assistant Commissioner of Police for Pune city. He belongs to Saygaon of Taluka Chalisgaon. He completed his B.A. with a first class graduation from Rashtriya College Chalisgaon through North Maharashtra University.

== Service Journey ==
- Maharashtra Police Academy Nashik Post DYSP Year 2017–2018
- Pune Gramin probation Period Year 2018–2019
- Pune Crime Branch Posting as ACP Year 2019 for 9 months
- Yerawada Division as ACP Year 2019 for 4 Months
- Pune Traffic Police Division Posting as ACP Year 2020 to till date

== National achievements ==
- Akhil Bhartiya Vidyapith Kusti Spardha Kolhapur, Kasya Padak 2006-07 (आखिल भारतीय विद्यापीठ कुस्ती स्पर्धा, कोल्हापूर, कांस्य पदक २००६ - २००७)
- Akhil Bhartiya Vidyapith Kusti Spardha rohtak, Haryana, Kasya Padak 2008-09 (आखिल भारतीय विद्यापीठ कुस्ती स्पर्धा, रोहतक, हरियाणा, कांस्य पदक २००८ - २००९)
- Akhil Bhartiya Varishtha Kusti Spardha Ranchi, Zaharkhand sahabhag 2011 (आखिल भारतीय वरिष्ठ खुल्या कुस्ती स्पर्धा, रांची, झारखंड सहभाग २०११)
- Akhil Bhartiya Rashtriya Khulya Kusti Spardha Ranchi, Zaharkhand sahabhag 2011 (आखिल भारतीय राष्ट्रीय खुल्या कुस्ती स्पर्धा, रांची, झारखंड सहभाग २०११)
- Akhil Bhartiya Rashtriya Khulya Kusti Spardha Gonda, Uttar Pradesh sahabhag 2012 (आखिल भारतीय राष्ट्रीय खुल्या कुस्ती स्पर्धा, गोंडा, उत्तरप्रदेश सहभाग २०१२)
- Maharashtra State Police Games (MSPG) Wrestling Competition - Gold Medal Year 2018
- Maharashtra State Police Games (MSPG) Wrestling Competition - Gold Medal Year 2019
- Maharashtra State Police Games (MSPG) Wrestling Competition - Gold Medal Year 2020
- Rashtriya Krida Gaurav Puraskar From Rajyapal in Pune 2021-22 (राष्ट्रीय क्रीडा गौरव पुरस्कार, राज्यपाल यांचे कडून 2021-22 पुणे)
