= Bert Owen =

English wrestler

Personal information
- Nationality: British (English)
- Born: England

Sport
- Sport: Wrestling
- Event: Welterweight
- Club: Victor Gymnasium, Anfield

Herbert "Bert" Owen is a former international wrestler from England who competed at the Commonwealth Games.

== Biography ==
Owen wrestled out of Bolton and was the 1967 Northern Open champion. He was a member of the Victor Gymnasium in Anfield and was a British champion at middle-heavyweight.

Owen represented the England team at the 1966 British Empire and Commonwealth Games in Kingston, Jamaica, where he participated in 74 kg welterweight category being out-pointed by Hukum Singh of India and was defeated by a fall against gold medal winner Muhammad Bashir of Pakistan.
