= John McCourtney =

British wrestler

Personal information
- Nationality: British (Scottish)
- Born: 15 November 1943 Glasgow, Scotland
- Died: 9 April 2022 (aged 78) Milngavie, Scotland
- Height: 164 cm (5 ft 5 in)
- Weight: 63 kg (139 lb)

Sport
- Sport: Wrestling
- Event: Featherweight
- Club: Milngavie 41 Club

John McCourtney (15 November 1943 – 9 April 2022) was a British wrestler who competed at the 1968 Summer Olympics..

== Biography ==
McCourtney represented the Scotland team at the 1966 British Empire and Commonwealth Games in Kingston, Jamaica, where he participated in 62kg featherweight category.

At the 1968 Olympic Games in Mexico, McCourtney competed in the men's freestyle 63 kg.

McCourtney won the British Wrestling Championships in 1968. He died on April 9, 2022.
