= Laurie Bryce =

Scottish athlete

Personal information
- Nationality: British (Scottish)
- Born: 25 January 1943 (age 83)

Sport
- Sport: Athletics
- Event: Hammer throw
- Club: Edinburgh University AC

Laurence "Laurie" Millar Bryce (born 25 January 1943) is a former track and field athlete from Scotland who competed at three Commonwealth Games.

== Biography ==
Bryce studied at the University of Edinburgh and was a member of their athletics club.

Bryce represented the Scottish Empire and Commonwealth Games team at the 1966 British Empire and Commonwealth Games in Kingston, Jamaica, participating in one event, the hammer throw event.

He won five consecutive hammer throw titles at the Scottish AAA Championships from 1965 to 1969.

Bryce went on to compete for Scoptland at two more Commonwealth Games; finishing fourth in the hammer throw event at the 1970 British Commonwealth Games and eighth in the hammer event at the 1974 British Commonwealth Games.

His son is Colin Bryce, a Winter Olympian and world's strongest man presenter.
