= Anil Mondal =

Indian weightlifter (born 1951)

Personal information
- Full name: Anil Kumar Mondal
- Nationality: Indian
- Born: 4 August 1951 (age 73); West Bengal, India

Sport
- Sport: Weightlifting

Anil Kumar Mondal (born 4 August 1951) is an Indian weightlifter. He competed at the 1972 Summer Olympics and the 1976 Summer Olympics. He was conferred with the Arjuna Award in the year 1972 by the Government of India.
