= Tony Greig (wrestler) =

New Zealand wrestler (born 1941)

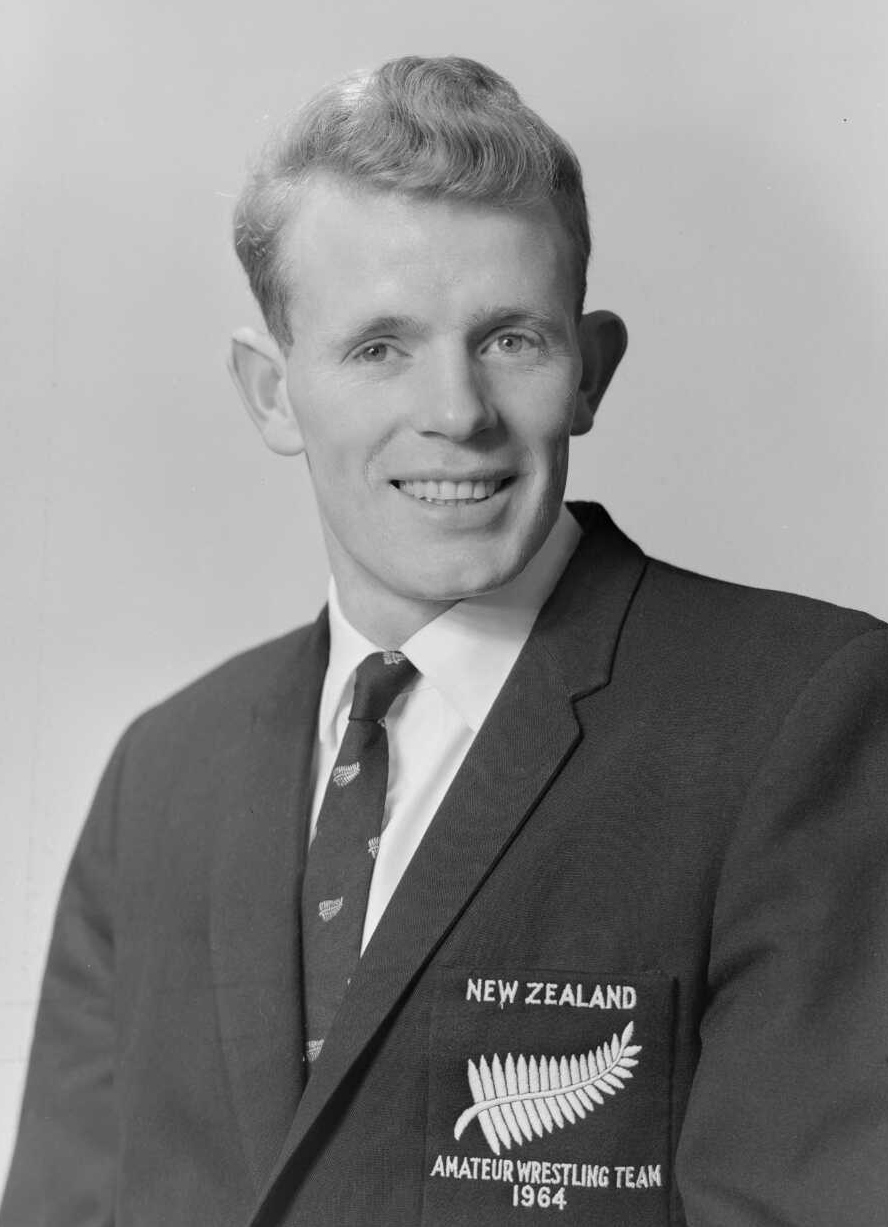
- Greig in 1964

Personal information
- Born: 22 July 1941 (age 85) Wellington, New Zealand
- Height: 175 cm (5 ft 9 in)
- Weight: 69 kg (152 lb)

Sport
- Sport: Freestyle wrestling
Medal record
Representing New Zealand
British Empire and Commonwealth Games
Bronze medal – third place	1966 Kingston	-70 kg

Anthony Granville Greig (born 22 July 1941) is a former lightweight freestyle wrestler from New Zealand. He won a bronze medal at the 1966 British Empire and Commonwealth Games, and was eliminated in the second bout at the 1964 Summer Olympics.
