= Zbigniew Żedzicki =

Polish wrestler

Zbigniew Żedzicki (born 28 June 1945 in Alfeld) is a Polish former wrestler who competed in the 1968 Summer Olympics, in the 1972 Summer Olympics, and in the 1976 Summer Olympics.
