= Mohammed Said =

Mohammed Said or Mohammed Saeed may refer to:

== Politicians ==
- Mehmed Said Pasha (1838–1914), Ottoman grand vizier
- Mohammed Said Hersi Morgan, Somali politician and military official (1949–2025)
- Mohamed Said Farole, Somali politician
- Said Mohamed Hersy, Somali military official
- Yirmisekizzade Mehmed Said Pasha (died 1761), Ottoman grand vizier
- Mohammad Said Yusof (1959–2023), Malaysian politician
- Mohammed Said Bareh (died 2008), Eritrean politician
- Muhammad Ali, Prince of Said (born 1979), Egyptian prince
- Muhammad Osman Said (1924–2007), Prime Minister of Libya
- Muhammad Said al-Attar (1927–2005), acting Prime Minister of Yemen
- Sa'id of Egypt (1822–1863), or Muhammad Sa'id Pasha, fourth ruler of Egypt from the Muhammad Ali dynasty
- Mohamed Said Pasha (1863–1928), Prime Minister of Iraq
- Mohamed Saeed (Maldivian politician) (born 1974), Economics Minister of the Maldives

== Sports ==
- Mohamed Said (athlete), Egyptian 1992 Paralympian
- Mohamed Ering (Mohamed Ahmed Saeed), Sudanese footballer

== Others ==
- Mohamed Said (actor) (1987/1988–2024), Swedish actor in the TV series Andra avenyn
- Mohamed Said Atom, Somali militia leader
- Mohammad Saeed (cricketer, born 1910) (1910–1979), Pakistani cricketer
- Mohammad Saeed (cricketer, born 1983), Pakistani cricketer
- Muhammad Saeed (general), Pakistan Army officer and government administrator
- Muhammad Said (GIA), a leader of the Armed Islamic Group of Algeria
- Muhammed Said Abdulla (1918–1991), Tanzanian author
- Muhammad Said Al Amudi (1905–1991), Saudi Arabian journalist, literary critic and official
