= Maruti Mane =

Indian wrestler (1938–2010)

Personal information
- Nationality: Indian
- Born: 10 August 1938 Sangli, Bombay Presidency
- Died: 27 July 2010 (aged 71) Kavathe Piran, Miraj, Maharashtra, India
- Occupation: Olympic wrestler
Medal record
Representing India
Men's Freestyle Wrestling
Commonwealth Games
Silver medal – second place	1970 Edinburgh	Super Heavyweight
Asian Games
Gold medal – first place	1962 Jakarta	-97 kg
Silver medal – second place	1962 Jakarta	-97 kg

Maruti Mane (10 August 1938 – 27 July 2010) was an Indian former wrestler who competed in the 1964 Summer Olympics.

Mane had a glorious run as a wrestler between 1962 and 1972 and did exceedingly well for the country in major championships. In the 1970 Commonwealth Games, he won silver in the unlimited freestyle event. In the 1962 Asian Games, he won gold in the 97 kg freestyle and the silver in the 97 kg Greco-Roman events.

Mane was crowned Hind Kesari in 1964 after defeating Rajasthan wrestler Mahiruddin. He was at one time listed among the best wrestlers in the world.

In his wrestling days, Mane used to work out for almost 10 to 12 hours daily. His fitness was said to be the reason for him lasting a good 11 minutes against them then all-conquering Russian wrestler Alexander Medved in 1967.

He was awarded with Dhyanchand Award in 2005 for his contribution to the wrestling.

== International tournaments ==
Medal	Year	Championship	Venue	Style	Event	Opponent	Outcome
Silver	1970	Commonwealth Games	Edinburgh, United Kingdom	Freestyle	Super heavyweight	Ikram Ilahi; Pakistan	Silver
Gold	1962	Asian Games	Jakarta, Indonesia	Freestyle	Light heavyweight 97 kg	Haruo Takagi; Japan	Winner
Silver	1962	Asian Games	Jakarta, Indonesia	Greco-Roman	Light heavyweight 97 kg	Haruo Takagi; Japan	Shared Silver
