= Ian Duncan (wrestler) =

British wrestler

Personal information
- Nationality: British (Scottish)
- Born: Scotland

Sport
- Sport: Wrestling
- Club: Edinburgh
Medal record
Men's freestyle wrestling
Representing Scotland
Commonwealth Games
Bronze medal – third place	1974 Christchurch	Heavyweight

Ian Duncan is a former freestyle wrestler from Scotland who competed at the Commonwealth Games, winning a bronze medal.

== Biography ==
Duncan represented the Scottish team at the 1974 British Commonwealth Games in Christchurch, New Zealand, where he competed in the 100 kg heavyweight category, winning a bronze medal.

Duncan represented the Great Britain team and was a three-times winner of the British Wrestling Championships at heavyweight in 1973, 1979 and 1980.

In 1980 he received a silver award in recognition for his services to Scottish sport.
