= Dadu Chowgule =

Indian wrestler

Personal information
- Born: Kolhapur, Maharashtra, India
- Died: 20 October 2019 Kolhapur, Maharashtra, India

Sport
- Sport: Freestyle wrestling
- Event: Commonwealth Games
- Club: Motibaug Talim
Medal record
Representing India
Commonwealth Games
Silver medal – second place	1974 Christchurch	Heavyweight category

Dadu Chowgule (c. 1946 – 20 October 2019, name is also spelt as Dadu Chaugule or Dadu Chougule) was an Indian wrestler from Maharashtra, India. He was a two-time winner of the Maharashtra Kesari title and was also awarded the Rustam-e-Hind and Mahan Bharat Kesari titles. He represented India at the international level, winning a silver medal in the heavyweight category at the 1974 British Commonwealth Games in New Zealand. He was awarded the Dhyan Chand Award by the Government of India in 2018. Chowgule died on 20 October 2019, in Kolhapur due to a heart attack at the age of 73.

He trained at Motibaug Talim, a wrestling academy, under the guidance of wrestlers such as Ganpat Andalkar and Balu Bire. He was trained in traditional Indian wrestling techniques.

== Achievements and awards ==
- Maharashtra Kesari (1970, 1971)
- Rustam-e-Hind (1973)
- Mahan Bharat Kesari (1973)
- Silver Medal at 1974 British Commonwealth Games
- Dhyan Chand Award for Lifetime Achievement in Sports (2018)

== See also ==
- List of Commonwealth Games medallists in wrestling
