= Kevin McGrath (wrestler) =

Australian wrestler (born 1946)

Personal information
- Nationality: Australian
- Born: 16 March 1946 (age 80)

Sport
- Sport: Wrestling
Medal record
Wrestling
Representing Australia
British Empire (and Commonwealth) Games
Silver medal – second place	1966 Kingston	Men's Bantamweight

Kevin Robert McGrath (born 16 March 1946) is an Australian wrestler. He competed in the men's freestyle bantamweight at the 1964 Summer Olympics.
