= Marco Terán =

Ecuadorian wrestler

Personal information
- Born: 24 September 1950 (age 74); Pichincha, Ecuador

Sport
- Sport: Wrestling

Marco Terán (born 24 September 1950) is an Ecuadorian wrestler. He competed at the 1968 Summer Olympics and the 1976 Summer Olympics.
