= Bhim Singh (wrestler) =

Indian wrestler

Sport
- Sport: Freestyle wrestling
Medal record
Representing India
Commonwealth Games
Gold medal – first place	1966 Kingston	+97 kg
Asian Games
Gold medal – first place	1966 Bangkok	+97 kg

Bhim Singh is an Indian retired heavyweight freestyle wrestler. In 1966 he won a gold medal at the Commonwealth Games and a Gold at the Asian Games, and received the Arjuna Award. He should not be confused with fellow wrestlers Bishambar Singh and Bishwanath Singh who competed in the same period, but in different weight categories.
