= Anthony Shacklady =

British wrestler (1945–2014)

Personal information
- Nationality: British (English)
- Born: 26 December 1945 Eccles, England
- Died: 25 February 2014 (aged 68) Salford, England

Sport
- Sport: Wrestling
Medal record
Men's freestyle wrestling
Representing England
Commonwealth Games
Silver medal – second place	1974 Christchurch	74 kg

Anthony "Tony" Shacklady (26 December 1945 – 25 February 2014) was a male British wrestler who competed at the 1968 Summer Olympics, the 1972 Summer Olympics and the 1976 Summer Olympics..

== Wrestling career ==
Shacklady also represented England and won a silver medal in the 74kg welterweight division, at the 1974 British Commonwealth Games in Christchurch, New Zealand. Four years later he represented England again but in the 82kg division, at the 1978 Commonwealth Games in Edmonton, Canada, finishing in fourth place.

Shacklady was a three-times winner of the British Wrestling Championships in 1969, 1971 and 1972.
