= Ivan Shavov =

Bulgarian wrestler (born 1943)

Ivan Shavov (Bulgarian: Иван Шавов; born 17 September 1943) is a Bulgarian former wrestler who competed in the 1968 Summer Olympics and in the 1972 Summer Olympics.
