= Bruce Akers =

Australian former sport wrestler

Personal information
- Full name: Bruce Robert Akers
- Born: 28 February 1953 (age 73)

Bruce Robert Akers (born 28 February 1953) is an Australian former wrestler who competed in the 1972 Summer Olympics and in the 1976 Summer Olympics as well as the 1974 British Commonwealth Games.

== Animal cruelty ==
Akers later ran horses in picnic meets. In 2016, neighbors reported foul odors coming from his property. Officers found 22 horses that had died of starvation on his property, and one, trapped upside down with his legs in the air which had to be euthanized on site. More than twenty others were found alive in severe states of starvation, some with a body score of zero. Animal care officers confiscated 21 horses, and three had to be euthanized. He was charged with 92 animal cruelty offences. He admitted 23 charges of animal neglect and was initially sentenced to 18 months in jail, but on appeal this sentence was reduced to 6 months plus a 12-month community corrections order.
