= Jit Singh =

Indian wrestler (born 1937)

Personal information
- Nationality: Indian
- Born: 13 January 1937 (age 89)

Sport
- Sport: Wrestling

Jit Singh (born 13 January 1937) is an Indian wrestler. He competed in the men's freestyle middleweight at the 1964 Summer Olympics.
