= Ray Brown (wrestler) =

Australian wrestler (born 1943)

Personal information
- Nationality: Australian
- Born: 16 February 1943 (age 83)

Sport
- Sport: Wrestling
Medal record
CommonwealthGames
Bronze medal – third place	1974 Christchurch	Men's Featherweight

Raymond Geoffrey Brown (born 16 February 1943) is an Australian wrestler. He competed in the men's freestyle featherweight at the 1964 Summer Olympics.
