= Taras Hryb =

Canadian wrestler

Taras Hryb (27 March 1952 in Victoria, British Columbia – 25 November 2021 in Salmon Arm, British Columbia) was a Canadian wrestler who competed in the 1972 Summer Olympics. In the 1974 British Commonwealth Games, he finished third in the 82.0 kg freestyle category. In the 1971 Pan American Games he finished third in the 87.0 kg freestyle category. Hryb was inducted into the Canadian Wrestling Hall of Fame in 1988 and the Greater Victoria Sports Hall of Fame in 2002.
