= Maurice Allan =

British wrestler (born 1945)

Personal information
- Nationality: British (Scottish)
- Born: 30 October 1945 (age 81) Edinburgh, Scotland
- Height: 181 cm (5 ft 11 in)
- Weight: 86 kg (190 lb)

Sport
- Sport: Wrestling
Medal record
Men's freestyle wrestling
Representing Scotland
Commonwealth Games
Bronze medal – third place	1974 Christchurch	90 kg
Men's sambo
Representing Great Britain
World Championships
Gold medal – first place	1975 Minsk	90 kg
European Championships
Bronze medal – third place	1974 Madrid	90 kg

Maurice Allan (born 30 October 1945) is a British wrestler who competed at the 1976 Summer Olympics.

== Biography ==
In 1974, Allan won bronze in freestyle wrestling at the European Commonwealth Games. Also during 1974, Allan demonstrated himself to be a world class competitor in Sambo. In Madrid, Allan took bronze at the 1974 European Sambo Championships. The following year, in Minsk, Allan became world champion by winning gold at the 1975 World Sambo Championships. In 1975, he was made an MBE.

At the 1976 Olympic Games in Montreal, he participated in the men's freestyle 90 kg event.

Allan was a four-times winner of the British Wrestling Championships at light-heavyweight in 1973, 1974, 1975 and 1976.
