= Robert Chamberot =

Canadian wrestler (born 1939)

Personal information
- Nationality: Canadian
- Born: 25 February 1939 (age 87)

Sport
- Sport: Wrestling

Robert Chamberot (born 25 February 1939) is a Canadian wrestler. He competed in the men's freestyle 87 kg at the 1968 Summer Olympics.
