= Pekka Alanen =

Finnish wrestler

Personal information
- Nationality: Finnish
- Born: 14 July 1945 (age 79); Lappajärvi, Finland

Sport
- Sport: Wrestling

Pekka Alanen (born 14 July 1945) is a Finnish wrestler. He competed at the 1964 Summer Olympics and the 1968 Summer Olympics.
