= Jagrup Singh =

Indian wrestler (born 1942)

Personal information
- Nationality: Indian
- Born: 15 September 1942 (age 84)

Sport
- Sport: Wrestling

Jagrup Singh (born 15 September 1942) is an Indian wrestler. He competed in the men's freestyle 68 kg at the 1972 Summer Olympics.
