= Egon Beiler =

Canadian wrestler (born 1953)

Personal information
- Nationality: Canadian
- Born: March 27, 1953 (age 73) Linz, Austria
- Height: 164 cm (5 ft 5 in)
- Weight: 62 kg (137 lb)

Sport
- Sport: Wrestling
- Event: Freestyle
Medal record
Men's freestyle wrestling
Representing Canada
Pan American Games
Bronze medal – third place	1979 San Juan	68 kg

Egon Beiler (born March 27, 1953, in Linz, Austria) was a past member of three Olympic wrestling teams and has numerous National titles to his name.

A graduate of the University of Western Ontario Dr. Beiler has been practicing dentistry in the Kitchener-Waterloo area since 1981. He continues to play squash and curling. He has a cottage in the Beaver Valley area. Married to wife Carol Beiler, and together they have 5 children.
