= Moisés López (wrestler) =

Mexican wrestler (born 1941)

Moises López (born 3 September 1941) is a Mexican former wrestler who competed in the 1964 Summer Olympics, in the 1968 Summer Olympics, in the 1972 Summer Olympics, and in the 1976 Summer Olympics.
