= Muhammad Niaz =

Pakistani wrestler

Medal record

Men's Wrestling

Representing Pakistan

Asian Games
Gold medal – first place	1962 Jakarta	Greco-Roman 97 kg
Bronze medal – third place	1962 Jakarta	Freestyle 97 kg

Commonwealth Games
Gold medal – first place	1962 Perth	Freestyle +97 kg

Muhammad Niaz is a retired heavyweight freestyle wrestler from Pakistan.

== Career ==
At the 1962 British Empire and Commonwealth Games in Perth, Niaz won the gold medal alongside another Pakistani wrestler with the same name Muhammad Niaz-Din. He also participated at the 1962 Asian Games in Jakarta, Indonesia in both freestyle and Greco-Roman styles. He won the Greco-Roman competition but finished third in freestyle.
