= Bazaryn Sükhbaatar =

Mongolian wrestler

Personal information
- Nationality: Mongolian
- Born: 15 May 1943 (age 81); Bulgan, Mongolia

Sport
- Sport: Wrestling

Bazaryn Sükhbaatar (born 15 May 1943) is a bantamweight Mongolian wrestler. He competed at the 1964 Summer Olympics and the 1968 Summer Olympics.
