= Wesley O'Brien =

Australian wrestler

Personal information
- Nationality: Australian
- Born: 5 August 1948 (age 78) Sunshine, Victoria, Australia

Sport
- Sport: Wrestling

Wesley O'Brien (born 5 August 1948) is an Australian wrestler. He competed in two events at the 1968 Summer Olympics.
