= Prem Nath (wrestler) =

Indian freestyle wrestler

Personal information
- Nationality: Indian
- Citizenship: India
- Born: 1 July 1951
- Died: 1 June 2015 (aged 63) New Delhi
- Education: Hansraj College, University of Delhi
- Occupation: Sports
- Years active: 1960-2010
- Other interests: Wrestling

Sport
- Country: India
- Sport: Wrestling
- Weight class: 57
- Event: Commonwealth Games 1974 in New Zealand
- Team: Indian Wrestling Federation
- Coached by: Guru Hanuman
- Retired: Delhi Police

Achievements and titles
- Commonwealth finals: Gold medalist in 1974 Commonwealth Games, New Zealand.

Prem Nath (1 July 1951 – 1 June 2015) was an Indian freestyle wrestler. He won a gold medal at the 1974 Commonwealth Wrestling Championship in Christchurch. He was a President's Medal-winning retired Delhi Police official and was known for his efforts to popularise wrestling in Delhi.

== Personal life ==
Prem Nath was trained by coach Guru Hanuman. He is survived by his wife, two sons and a daughter.

== Career ==
- 1976 He took over an akhara (established by Guru Baijnath in 1948) in the Kamla Nagar area, and ran it for a long time before handing it over to his son Vikram Kumar Sonkar, a current India coach, in 2004. It is now known as the Guru Prem Nath Akhara.
- 1974, He won a gold medal in the 57 kg category at the 1974 British Commonwealth Games in New Zealand.
- 1972, He was given the Arjuna Award by the President of India in 1972.
- He showed a great performance in 1972 Summer Olympics and finished in fourth place in the freestyle bantamweight category.
