= Tam Anderson =

Scottish wrestler

Personal information
- Nationality: British (Scottish)
- Born: Scotland

Sport
- Sport: Wrestling
- Event: Lightweight
- Club: Schiltorn Club

Thomas "Tam" Anderson is a former international wrestler from Scotland who competed at three Commonwealth Games.

== Biography ==
Anderson from Milngavie, Dunbartonshire, fought at lightweight and won the Scottish freestyle title in 1966.

Anderson represented the Scotland team at the 1966 British Empire and Commonwealth Games in Kingston, Jamaica, where he participated in 68kg lightweight weight category, where he was outpointed by Canadian Ray Lougheed.

In 1967, as a member of the Schiltron Club and won the West of Scotland title. Shortly afterwards he won the Scottish title and was regarded as one of Scotland's best wrestlers.

In 1970, living at 10 Braehead Avenue in Milngavie at the time, he went to a second Games, when selected for the 1970 British Commonwealth Games in Edinburgh.

By 1974 he had been the Scottish lightweight champion eight times, was the coach to the Milngavie Boys Wrestling Club and represented Scotland for the third time at the 1974 British Commonwealth Games.
