= Bishambar Singh =

Indian freestyle wrestler

Bishambar singh
Personal information
- Born: 1 October 1940 Bahipur, Uttar Pradesh, India
- Died: 2004 (aged 63–64)
- Height: 156 cm (5 ft 1 in)
- Weight: 57 kg (126 lb)

Sport
- Sport: Freestyle wrestling
- Club: Indian Railways
Medal record
Representing India
World Championships
Silver medal – second place	1967 New Delhi	–57 kg
Commonwealth Games
Gold medal – first place	1966 Kingston	–57 kg
Asian Games
Bronze medal – third place	1966 Bangkok	–57 kg

Bishambar Singh (also Bishamber, 1 October 1940 – 2004) is a retired Indian bantamweight wrestler. In 1966 he won a gold medal at the Commonwealth Games and a bronze at the Asian Games, both in freestyle wrestling. Next year he won a silver medal at the world championships, he is the 1st Indian who won the Silver medal in world wrestling championship. He competed at the 1964 and 1968 Olympics in freestyle and Greco-Roman divisions with the best result of sixth place in freestyle in 1964. The same year he received the Arjuna Award. He should not be confused with fellow wrestlers Bhim Singh and Bishwanath Singh who competed in the same period, but in heavyweight categories.
