= Bishwanath Singh =

Indian wrestler

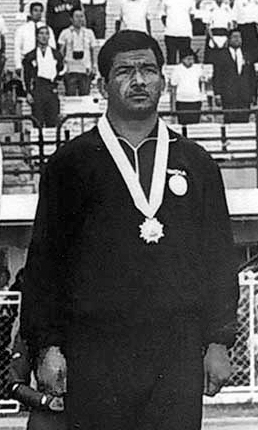
- Singh at the 1966 Asian Games

Personal information
- Born: Siwan, Bihar
- Died: 1999 Rohtak
- Weight: 100 Kg

Sport
- Sport: Freestyle wrestling
- Events: Commonwealth Games, Asian Games
Medal record
Representing India
Commonwealth Games
Bronze medal – third place	1966 Kingston	-97 kg
Silver medal – second place	1970 Edinburgh	-100 kg
Silver medal – second place	1974 Christchurch	+100 kg
Asian Games
Silver medal – second place	1966 Bangkok	-97 kg

Bishwanath Singh (died 1999) was an Indian heavyweight freestyle wrestler and Indian Army servicemember. In 1966 he won a silver medal at the Asian Games and a bronze at the Commonwealth Games. He also won silver medals at the 1970 and 1974 Commonwealth Games. He should not be confused with fellow wrestlers Bishambar Singh and Bhim Singh who competed in the same period, but in different weight category. He was born in a Hindu Bhumihar family in a village called Dumrahar bujurg डुमरहर बुजुर्ग (Thana- Darauli) in Siwan, Bihar.
