= 1966 British Empire and Commonwealth Games =

Multi-sport event in Kingston, Jamaica

VIII British Empire and Commonwealth Games
- Host city: Kingston, Jamaica
- Nations: 34
- Athletes: 1,316 (inc. officials)
- Events: 110 events in 10 sports
- Opening: 4 August 1966
- Closing: 13 August 1966
- Opened by: Prince Philip, Duke of Edinburgh
- Main venue: Independence Park

The 1966 British Empire and Commonwealth Games were held in Kingston, Jamaica, from 4 to 13 August 1966. This was the first time that the Games had been held outside the so-called White Dominions. The opening ceremony was the first Games to be opened in the evening. The event was followed by the 1966 Commonwealth Paraplegic Games for wheelchair athletes. Jamaica remains the only host nation of a Commonwealth Games that did not win at least one gold medal in its own games.

Two sports; lawn bowls and rowing were dropped from the Games due to lack of facilities and were replaced by the debut sports of badminton and shooting. A record 38 countries competed at the Games.

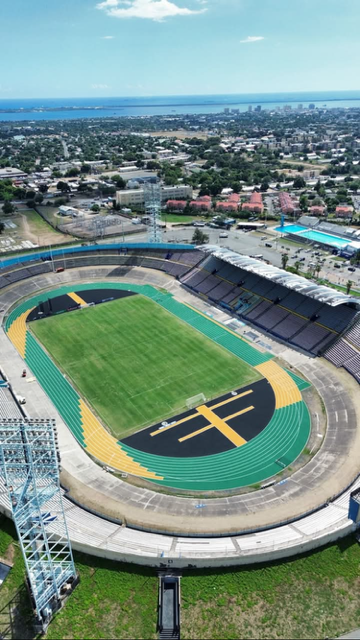
The National Stadium was the primary venue for the Games

== Host selection ==
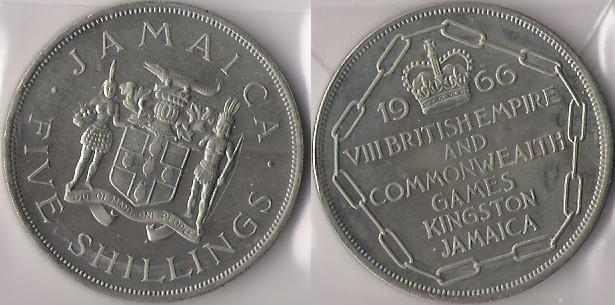
A Jamaican five-shilling coin commemorating the Games

Kingston was elected host by the CGF in Rome, Italy, during the 1960 Summer Olympics.

1966 British Empire and Commonwealth Games bidding results
| City | Country | Votes |
|---|---|---|
| Kingston | Jamaica | 17 |
| Edinburgh | Scotland | 12 |
| Salisbury | Rhodesia and Nyasaland | 5 |

== Venues ==
- Athletes' Village – University of the West Indies at Mona
- Athletics, opening and closing ceremonies – National Stadium in Independence Park
- Badminton – Kingston Convention Hall
- Boxing – National Stadium and Sabina Park
- Cycling (track) – National Stadium in Independence Park
- Cycling (road) –
- Diving – National Aquatic Centre in Independence Park
- Fencing – Excelsior School Auditorium
- Shooting – Twickenham Park Range, Spanish Town
- Swimming – National Aquatic Centre in Independence Park
- Weightlifting - Ward Theatre
- Wrestling – Kingston Convention Hall

== Participating teams ==
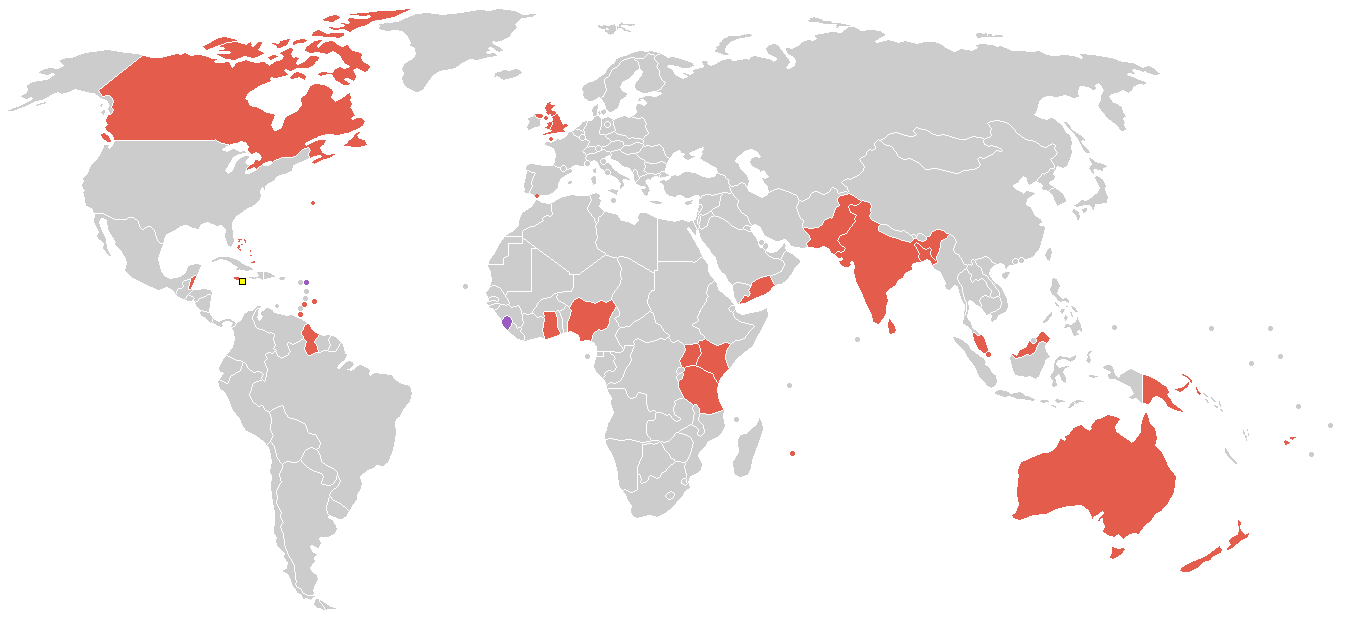
Countries that participated

34 teams were represented at the 1966 British Empire and Commonwealth Games.
(Teams competing for the first time are shown in bold).

Participating Commonwealth countries and territories:

- **Antigua and Barbuda**—first appearance
- Australia
- Bahamas
- Barbados
- Bermuda
- British Honduras
- Canada
- Ceylon
- England
- Fiji
- Ghana
- Gibraltar
- Guyana
- India
- Isle of Man
- Jamaica **(host)**
- Jersey
- Kenya
- Malaysia
- Mauritius
- New Zealand
- Nigeria
- Northern Ireland
- Pakistan
- (Papua New Guinea) Papua and New Guinea
- Saint Vincent and the Grenadines
- Scotland
- Sierra Leone
- Singapore
- **South Arabia**—first appearance
- **Tanzania**—first appearance
- Trinidad and Tobago
- Uganda
- Wales

== Medals table ==
* Host nation (Jamaica)

Medals won by nation, ranked and sortable
| Rank | Nation | Gold | Silver | Bronze | Total |
|---|---|---|---|---|---|
| 1 | England | 33 | 24 | 23 | 80 |
| 2 | Australia | 23 | 28 | 22 | 73 |
| 3 | Canada | 14 | 20 | 23 | 57 |
| 4 | New Zealand | 8 | 5 | 13 | 26 |
| 5 | Ghana | 5 | 2 | 2 | 9 |
| 5 | Trinidad and Tobago | 5 | 2 | 2 | 9 |
| 7 | Pakistan | 4 | 1 | 4 | 9 |
| 8 | Kenya | 4 | 1 | 3 | 8 |
| 9 | India | 3 | 4 | 3 | 10 |
| 9 | Nigeria | 3 | 4 | 3 | 10 |
| 11 | Wales | 3 | 2 | 2 | 7 |
| 12 | Malaysia | 2 | 2 | 1 | 5 |
| 13 | Scotland | 1 | 4 | 4 | 9 |
| 14 | Northern Ireland | 1 | 3 | 3 | 7 |
| 15 | Isle of Man | 1 | 0 | 0 | 1 |
| 16 | Jamaica* | 0 | 4 | 8 | 12 |
| 17 | Bahamas | 0 | 1 | 0 | 1 |
| 17 | Bermuda | 0 | 1 | 0 | 1 |
| 17 | Guyana | 0 | 1 | 0 | 1 |
| 17 | Papua and New Guinea | 0 | 1 | 0 | 1 |
| 21 | Uganda | 0 | 0 | 3 | 3 |
| 22 | Barbados | 0 | 0 | 1 | 1 |
| Totals (22 entries) | | **110** | **110** | **120** | **340** |

== Sports ==
- Aquatics ()
  - Diving ()
  - Swimming ()
- Athletics ()
- Badminton ()
- Boxing ()
- Cycling ()
- Fencing ()
- Shooting ()
- Weightlifting ()
- Wrestling ()

| Preceded by **Perth** | **British Empire and Commonwealth Games**; Kingston; **VIII British Empire and Commonwealth Games** | Succeeded by **Edinburgh** |
