= British Wrestling Association =

The British Wrestling Association

The British Wrestling Association Ltd, operating as British Wrestling (BWA), is the National Governing Body for wrestling in England and Great Britain. British Wrestling represents Great Britain internationally and is a member of United World Wrestling, the British Olympic Association and the Commonwealth Games England.

British Wrestling is the recognised governing body for range of disciplines including the Olympic and Commonwealth styles of Freestyle and Greco Roman Wrestling and other styles within the remit of United World Wrestling, as well as other indigenous forms of wrestling such as Cornish Wrestling, Cumberland and Westmorland Wrestling and Catch As Catch Can.

As a company limited by guarantee, British Wrestling was incorporated in 2001.

== History ==
=== Foundation and the 1908 Olympic Mandate (1904–1920) ===
The founding of the National Amateur Wrestling Association (NAWA) in January 1904 marked a pivotal moment for organised amateur wrestling in the UK. The association was established with the specific, immediate goal of creating a formal structure that would allow Great Britain to compete effectively at the upcoming 1908 London Summer Olympics. This clear mandate toward international elite competition shaped the NAWA's early focus.

To prepare for the Olympics, the NAWA established the framework for competitive standards by organising its inaugural British Wrestling Championships in 1905. The 1908 Games proved to be the most successful in British wrestling history, yielding 11 total medals, including three gold medals.

=== Disambiguation: The Amateur/Professional Split ===
Throughout the 20th century, the BWA maintained a governance focus strictly on amateur, rule-based styles that aligned with international Olympic structures. This clarity became essential during the 1930s with the sudden emergence and popularisation of "All-in Wrestling," a theatrical, entertainment-focused style that preceded modern professional wrestling.

A separate, temporary regulatory attempt occurred in 1931 when individuals associated with the early professional scene, notably Atholl Oakeley and Henry Irslinger, attempted to establish a controlling body referred to by some as the "British Wrestling Association" or the "British Board of Control". This organisation aimed to regulate the nascent "all-in" professional matches. However, contemporary analysis suggests this body, focused on regulating choreographed spectacle ("admitted fakery") , was more of a futile attempt by promoters to unify the professional circuit rather than a universally recognised NGB for the legitimate sport.

The amateur BWA, the 1904 institution, remained distinct, continuing its lineage by overseeing the Olympic competitive styles. Following World War II and the subsequent introduction of the Mountevans rules in professional wrestling, the BWA cemented its undisputed status as the sole governing authority for legitimate competitive wrestling in the UK

=== Modernisation (2001–2015) ===
Following the reorganisation of The Sports Council into UK Sport and four separate home nation sports councils and the association introduction of National Lottery funding for sports. There was a renewed focus on modernising the organisation to be a fundable entity.

In 2001 the association underwent a significant governance evolution by transitioning into a modern corporate structure. The current legal entity, The British Wrestling Association Limited, was formally incorporated on 30 March 2001 (Company No. 04190868), establishing the necessary legal framework and fiduciary responsibilities required of a modern NGB receiving public funds.

The English Olympic Wrestling Association dissolved and transferred its assets, including the Wrestling Academy located in Lower Broughton, Salford to the newly incorporated entity in 2001.

==== London 2012 Olympic Controversy and Funding Crisis ====
In the two Olympic cycles prior to the London 2012 Olympic Games the British Wrestling Association received a significant increase in public funding from UK Sport.

The 2012 London Olympics became a focal point for governance controversy within the BWA. As the host nation, the association was initially allocated three host nation places by the International Olympic Committee (IOC), subject to the British Olympic Association’s (BOA) approval that athletes meet a "credible performance" standard. To bridge a recognised performance gap, the BWA’s high-performance leadership implemented a controversial strategy of recruiting foreign-born athletes, primarily from Eastern Europe, over developing domestic talent. This move drew public criticism and complaints from homegrown British wrestlers, including Mark Cocker and Craig Pilling, who felt their assurances regarding domestic development were violated.

The strategy ultimately failed to meet its objective. Two key foreign-born athletes, Olga Butkevych and Yana Stadnik, faced issues obtaining British passports in time for the Games. Despite appealing the decision, the BOA refused to ratify two of the three host nation places, accepting only Olga Butkevych. Butkevych, the sole Team GB representative, was defeated in her opening bout in the 55kg category.

The conspicuous failure of the high-risk strategy resulted in immediate organizational upheaval. Performance Director Shaun Morley resigned to avoid a vote of no-confidence, and Head Coach Nikolai Kornieiev was dismissed. More critically, the failure provided UK Sport with justification to withdraw all high-performance funding (£1.435 million over the preceding four-year cycle) for the subsequent Rio 2016 Olympic cycle, adhering to its rigorous "No Compromise" funding policy.

The total withdrawal of UK Sport funding in December 2012 triggered a period of severe operational decline and program contraction for British wrestling. The termination of high-performance support effectively dismantled the elite infrastructure developed for the 2012 Games, resulting in the dismissal of key coaching personnel and the closure of centralized training initiatives. During this period, the association struggled to maintain its international standing; individual funding appeals for elite athletes, such as World bronze medalist Olga Butkevych and European silver medalist Yana Stadnik, were rejected for the Rio 2016 cycle.

By 2014, the association's leadership noted that elite performance had ceased to be the primary driver for the sport, which faced a stagnant membership base of roughly 1,200 individuals. This transition period was characterized by a "fighting fires" mentality as the organization operated with minimal resources and sought to justify its continued existence to statutory partners through foundational development rather than international results. The severe funding cut necessitated a major governance review and organizational restructuring within the BWA to eventually secure future developmental funding from Sport England.

=== Modern Governing Body and Reform (2015–Present) ===
A transformative period for the NGB's governance began in 2015 with the appointment of Jem Lawson as Chair. Lawson's tenure prioritized the reform of the Board and the modernization of the association's rules, culminating in the 2016–17 implementation of new Articles of Association that aligned with the Code for Sports Governance. These reforms established a professionalized Board structure featuring an Independent Chair and Independent Non-Executive Directors (INEDs) to provide objective strategic leadership.

The appointment of Craig Anthony as Chief Executive in September 2019 marked a further strategic shift. Under Anthony’s leadership, the BWA has prioritized a "development-first" philosophy, supported by increased investment from Sport England to strengthen grassroots growth, club infrastructure, and participation. While this focus on development has been central to recent efforts, the performance pathway has also seen a notable rebound following the period of poor results and total funding loss after 2012. Renewed confidence in the association’s talent systems led to a significant boost in UK Sport 'Development Sport' funding for the Los Angeles 2028 cycle. Steven Esom succeeded Lawson as Independent Chair in 2020 to continue overseeing this period of strategic rebuilding and modernization.

== Governance Structure ==
British Wrestling is bound by its Articles of Association which identify the Association as the National Governing Body of the sport of Wrestling in the United Kingdom. The Association is governed by a Board of Directors who are responsible for the overall governance, development and management of the sport of wrestling in the UK.

The BWA operates as a UK-wide NGB with a governance structure that includes its voting members, the three English regions (North, Midlands and South) and the home countries of Scotland, Wales, and Northern Ireland.

=== Home Country Associations ===
The BWA works closely with three affiliated Home Country Associations, each responsible for local governance and development:

1. Scottish Wrestling Association (SWA): Operating as SCOTTISH WRESTLING ASSOCIATION LTD. The SWA is the NGB for wrestling in Scotland and works in collaboration with British Wrestling to promote and grow the sport.
2. Welsh Wrestling Association (WWA): Known in Welsh as Cymdeithas Reslo Cymru. The WWA is the governing body for Wales, receiving support from Sport Wales.
3. Wrestling Northern Ireland (WNI): A constituted body replaced the Northern Ireland Wrestling Association which dissolved in 2019.

=== English Regions ===
England is divided into three regional committees which serve as voting members of the BWA:

- England – North Region
- England – Midlands Region
- England – South Region

These regional associations collectively form the English Wrestling Committee, to which the BWA Board delegates responsibility for promotion and development within England. The overarching Nations & Regions Committee ensures two-way communication between the Board and the affiliated clubs across all four Home Nations, addressing issues affecting local development.

== British Wrestling Championships ==
The British Wrestling Championships serve as the flagship national competition, determining national champions and selecting athletes for international squads. The inaugural championship took place in 1905, establishing the foundation for competitive amateur wrestling in the UK. Historical records demonstrate continuous adaptation in line with international weight class restructuring, which saw the introduction of divisions such as Light Flyweight (48 kg) and Super Heavyweight (130 kg) over the 20th century

== International Competitive Success ==
The competitive legacy of British wrestling is marked by a concentration of success at the start of the 20th century in the Olympics and consistent performance at the Commonwealth Games across the Home Nations.

=== Olympic Games Medalists (Team GB) ===
Great Britain has secured 17 medals in Olympic wrestling history, with all medals being won in the Men’s Freestyle discipline.

A historical peak occurred during the 1908 London Olympics, where 11 of the 17 total medals were claimed by British wrestlers. The three gold medalists from that event were Stanley Bacon (Middleweight), Con O'Kelly, Sr. (Heavyweight), and George de Relwyskow (Lightweight), who uniquely also earned a Silver medal in the Middleweight division.

The last Olympic medal for Great Britain was a Bronze secured by Noel Loban in the Men’s Freestyle Light-Heavyweight category at the 1984 Los Angeles Olympics.

Great Britain Olympic Wrestling Medalists

Year	Athlete	Style	Weight Class	Medal
1908 London	William J. Press	Freestyle, Men	Bantamweight	Silver
1908 London	Percy Slim	Freestyle, Men	Featherweight	Silver
1908 London	William McKie	Freestyle, Men	Featherweight	Bronze
1908 London	George de Relwyskow	Freestyle, Men	Lightweight	Gold
1908 London	Billy Wood	Freestyle, Men	Lightweight	Silver
1908 London	Arthur Gingell	Freestyle, Men	Lightweight	Bronze
1908 London	Stanley Bacon	Freestyle, Men	Middleweight	Gold
1908 London	George de Relwyskow	Freestyle, Men	Middleweight	Silver
1908 London	Fred Beck	Freestyle, Men	Middleweight	Bronze
1908 London	Con O'Kelly, Sr.	Freestyle, Men	Heavyweight	Gold
1908 London	Edmond Barrett	Freestyle, Men	Heavyweight	Bronze
1920 Antwerp	Bernard Bernard	Freestyle, Men	Featherweight	Bronze
1920 Antwerp	Herbert Wright	Freestyle, Men	Lightweight	Bronze
1924 Paris	Archie MacDonald	Freestyle, Men	Heavyweight	Bronze
1928 Amsterdam	Sam Rabin	Freestyle, Men	Middleweight	Bronze
1952 Helsinki	Ken Richmond	Freestyle, Men	Heavyweight	Bronze
1984 Los Angeles	Noel Loban	Freestyle, Men	Light-Heavyweight	Bronze

=== Commonwealth Games Medalists (Home Nations) ===
The Commonwealth Games represent a consistent area of success for the BWA's affiliated Home Nations (England, Scotland, and Wales). Medals have been won frequently since the Games were established.

Notable gold medalists include the Scottish bantamweight Edward Melrose (1934), the English heavyweight Kenneth Richmond (1954), and the prolific Noel Loban, who won Freestyle Light Heavyweight Gold for England in 1986. Success has also been achieved in disciplines other than Men's Freestyle, such as Myroslav Dykun's Greco-Roman Gold for England in 2010.

Recent Commonwealth Games have highlighted the successful integration of Women’s Wrestling (WW) into the performance pathway, with Yana Rattigan taking Silver in 2014 and Georgina Nelthorpe securing Bronze medals in the 2018 and 2022 Games. Wales has also contributed to the medal tally, notably through Craig Pilling and Kane Charig. The table below lists all Home Nations Commonwealth Games Wrestling medallists.

Name	Country	Commonwealth Games	Category	Medal
Harry Johnson	ENG	1930, Hamilton, Canada	FS Welterweight	Silver
Albert Sangwine	ENG	1930, Hamilton, Canada	FS Heavyweight	Silver
Edgar Bacon	ENG	1930, Hamilton, Canada	FS Light Heavyweight	Silver
Joseph Reid	ENG	1930, Hamilton, Canada	FS Bantamweight	Silver
Stanley Bissell	ENG	1930, Hamilton, Canada	FS Middleweight	Silver
Harold Angus	ENG	1930, Hamilton, Canada	FS Lightweight	Silver
Joseph Reid	ENG	1934, London, England	FS Bantamweight	Bronze
Stanley Bissell	ENG	1934, London, England	FS Middleweight	Silver
Bernard Rowe	ENG	1934, London, England	FS Light Heavyweight	Silver
William Fox	ENG	1934, London, England	FS Welterweight	Silver
G. E. North	ENG	1934, London, England	FS Lightweight	Silver
Archie Dudgeon	SCO	1934, London, England	FS Heavyweight	Bronze
Edward Melrose	SCO	1934, London, England	FS Bantamweight	Gold
Robert Harcus	SCO	1934, London, England	FS Middleweight	Bronze
Joe Nelson	ENG	1934, London, England	FS Featherweight	Silver
Murdoch White	SCO	1934, London, England	FS Featherweight	Bronze
Leslie Jeffers	ENG	1938, Sydney, Australia	FS Middleweight	Bronze
Thomas Ward	SCO	1938, Sydney, Australia	FS Light Heavyweight	Bronze
Ray Cazaux	ENG	1938, Sydney, Australia	FS Bantamweight	Bronze
Kenneth Richmond	ENG	1950, Auckland, New Zealand	FS Heavyweight	Bronze
Arnold Parsons	ENG	1950, Auckland, New Zealand	FS Featherweight	Bronze
Kenneth Richmond	ENG	1954, Vancouver, Canada	FS Heavyweight	Gold
Harry Kendall	ENG	1954, Vancouver, Canada	FS Middleweight	Bronze
Herbie Hall	ENG	1954, Vancouver, Canada	FS Featherweight	Silver
Ray Myland	ENG	1954, Vancouver, Canada	FS Middleweight	Bronze
Ray Myland	ENG	1958, Cardiff, Wales	FS Middleweight	Bronze
Alastair Duncan	SCO	1958, Cardiff, Wales	FS Lightweight	Silver
George Farquhar	SCO	1958, Cardiff, Wales	FS Middleweight	Silver
Albert Aspen	ENG	1958, Cardiff, Wales	FS Featherweight	Bronze
Denis McNamara	ENG	1962, Perth, Australia	FS Super Heavyweight	Bronze
Albert Aspen	ENG	1962, Perth, Australia	FS Featherweight	Bronze
Walter Pilling	ENG	1962, Perth, Australia	FS Bantamweight	Silver
Jim Turnbull	SCO	1962, Perth, Australia	FS Bantamweight	Bronze
Len Allen	ENG	1962, Perth, Australia	FS Welterweight	Bronze
Tony Buck	ENG	1962, Perth, Australia	FS Light Heavyweight	Gold
Denis McNamara	ENG	1966, Kingston, Jamaica	FS Super Heavyweight	Bronze
Albert Aspen	ENG	1966, Kingston, Jamaica	FS Featherweight	Bronze
Wallace Booth	SCO	1966, Kingston, Jamaica	FS Light Heavyweight	Silver
Denis McNamara	ENG	1970, Edinburgh, Scotland	FS Super Heavyweight	Bronze
Don Urquhart	SCO	1970, Edinburgh, Scotland	FS Light flyweight	Bronze
Terence Robinson	ENG	1970, Edinburgh, Scotland	FS Bantamweight	Bronze
Ronald Grinstead	ENG	1970, Edinburgh, Scotland	FS Middleweight	Bronze
Ian Duncan	SCO	1974, Christchurch, New Zealand	FS Heavyweight	Bronze
Tony Shacklady	ENG	1974, Christchurch, New Zealand	FS Welterweight	Silver
Maurice Allan	SCO	1974, Christchurch, New Zealand	FS Light Heavyweight	Bronze
Amrik Singh	ENG	1974, Christchurch, New Zealand	FS Bantamweight	Silver
Joe Gilligan	ENG	1974, Christchurch, New Zealand	FS Lightweight	Silver
Amrik Singh	ENG	1978, Edmonton, Canada	FS Bantamweight	Bronze
Joe Gilligan	ENG	1978, Edmonton, Canada	FS Lightweight	Silver
Brian Aspen	ENG	1978, Edmonton, Canada	FS Featherweight	Bronze
Keith Hayward	ENG	1978, Edmonton, Canada	FS Welterweight	Bronze
Mark Dunbar	ENG	1978, Edmonton, Canada	FS Light flyweight	Bronze
Albert Patrick	SCO	1978, Edmonton, Canada	FS Super Heavyweight	Silver
Brian Aspen	ENG	1982, Brisbane, Australia	FS Bantamweight	Gold
Albert Patrick	SCO	1982, Brisbane, Australia	FS Super Heavyweight	Bronze
Brian Aspen	ENG	1986, Edinburgh, Scotland	FS Bantamweight	Bronze
Albert Patrick	SCO	1986, Edinburgh, Scotland	FS Super Heavyweight	Silver
Anthony Bull	ENG	1986, Edinburgh, Scotland	FS Middleweight	Bronze
David Connelly	SCO	1986, Edinburgh, Scotland	FS Light flyweight	Bronze
David Kilpin	ENG	1986, Edinburgh, Scotland	FS Heavyweight	Bronze
Duncan Burns	ENG	1986, Edinburgh, Scotland	FS Light flyweight	Silver
Fitzlloyd Walker	ENG	1986, Edinburgh, Scotland	FS Welterweight	Bronze
Keith Peache	ENG	1986, Edinburgh, Scotland	FS Super Heavyweight	Bronze
Nigel Donahue	ENG	1986, Edinburgh, Scotland	FS Flyweight	Bronze
Stephen Cooper	ENG	1986, Edinburgh, Scotland	FS Lightweight	Bronze
Noel Loban	ENG	1986, Edinburgh, Scotland	FS Light Heavyweight	Gold
Noel Loban	ENG	1994, Victoria, Canada	FS Heavyweight	Silver
Graeme English	SCO	1994, Victoria, Canada	FS Light Heavyweight	Bronze
Amarjit Singh	ENG	1994, Victoria, Canada	FS Super Heavyweight	Bronze
Andrew Hutchinson	ENG	1994, Victoria, Canada	FS Flyweight	Silver
Calum McNeil	SCO	1994, Victoria, Canada	FS Welterweight	Bronze
John Melling	ENG	1994, Victoria, Canada	FS Featherweight	Silver
Myroslav Dykun	ENG	2010, Delhi, India	GR 66	Gold
Sasha Madyarchyk	ENG	2010, Delhi, India	FS Featherweight	Bronze
Terence Bosson	ENG	2010, Delhi, India	GR 60	Silver
Leon Rattigan	ENG	2010, Delhi, India	FS Heavyweight	Bronze
Leon Rattigan	ENG	2014, Glasgow, Scotland	FS Heavyweight	Bronze
Alex Gladkov	SCO	2014, Glasgow, Scotland	FS Lightweight	Bronze
Chinu Sandhu	ENG	2014, Glasgow, Scotland	FS Super Heavyweight	Bronze
Craig Pilling	WAL	2014, Glasgow, Scotland	FS Bantamweight	Bronze
Louisa Porogovska	ENG	2014, Glasgow, Scotland	WW 55	Bronze
Mike Grundy	ENG	2014, Glasgow, Scotland	FS Welterweight	Bronze
Viorel Etko	SCO	2014, Glasgow, Scotland	FS Featherweight	Bronze
Yana Rattigan	ENG	2014, Glasgow, Scotland	WW 48	Silver
Charlie Bowling	ENG	2018, Gold Coast, Australia	FS Lightweight	Bronze
Curtis Dodge	WAL	2018, Gold Coast, Australia	FS Welterweight	Bronze
Georgina Nelthorpe	ENG	2018, Gold Coast, Australia	WW 76	Bronze
Kane Charig	WAL	2018, Gold Coast, Australia	FS Lightweight	Silver
Syerus Eslami	ENG	2018, Gold Coast, Australia	FS Middleweight	Bronze
George Ramm	ENG	2022, Birmingham, England	FS Lightweight	Bronze
Mandhir Kooner	ENG	2022, Birmingham, England	FS Heavyweight	Bronze
Georgina Nelthorpe	ENG	2022, Birmingham, England	WW 76	Bronze
