= Dennis Gilligan =

British wrestler

Personal information
- Nationality: British (English)
- Born: 1931 Salford, England
- Died: June 2019 (aged 88)

Sport
- Sport: Wrestling
- Event: Bantamweight
- Club: Manco AWC, Stretford

Dennis Gilligan (1931 – June 2019) was a wrestler who competed for England.

== Biography ==
While at the Manco AWC in Stretford, Gilligan represented the England team in the -57 Kg division at the 1958 British Empire and Commonwealth Games in Cardiff, Wales.

Gilligan was a member of the Manchester YMCA Wrestling Club and the Barton Athletic Club and was three times British Bantamweight champion in 1965, 1967 and 1968 at the British Wrestling Championships.

Dennis Gilligan died in June 2019, at the age of 88.

== See also ==
- Stan Gilligan (brother) - England international wrestler.
- Joey Gilligan (nephew) - England international wrestler.
