= Wrestling at the Commonwealth Games =

Wrestling at the Commonwealth Games is an optional sport for the Commonwealth Games. It was one of the six original sports to be featured on the programme during the 1930 British Empire Games in Hamilton, Canada. The events were male only until women's events were added at the 2010 games and wrestling was present at all editions of the games program until 1990 when it was replaced by judo and gymnastics. It returned in 1994 but was again removed in 1998, when Malaysian organisers replaced it with ten-pin bowling, as the sport lacked popular appeal in the country and medal chances were also low. It was removed for a third time in 2006 for the addition of basketball., but on its return in 2010, the Indian organisers chose to add Greco-Roman wrestling in addition to the traditional freestyle wrestling. The sport was present in the 2014, 2018 and 2022 editions. It was announced in October 2024 that wrestling had not been chosen for the 2026 games.

== Editions ==
Games	Year	Host city	Host country	Best nation
I	1930	Hamilton, Ontario	Canada	Canada
II	1934	London	England	Canada
III	1938	Sydney	Australia	Australia
IV	1950	Auckland	New Zealand	Australia
V	1954	Vancouver	Canada	South Africa
VI	1958	Cardiff	Wales	South Africa
VII	1962	Perth	Australia	Pakistan
VIII	1966	Kingston	Jamaica	Pakistan
IX	1970	Edinburgh	Scotland	India
X	1974	Christchurch	New Zealand	Canada
XI	1978	Edmonton, Alberta	Canada	Canada
XII	1982	Brisbane, Queensland	Australia	Canada
XIII	1986	Edinburgh	Scotland	Canada
XV	1994	Victoria	Canada	Canada
XVII	2002	Manchester	England	Canada
XIX	2010	Delhi	India	India
XX	2014	Glasgow	Scotland	Canada
XXI	2018	Gold Coast, Queensland	Australia	India
XXII	2022	Birmingham	England	India

== All-time medal table ==
Updated after the 2022 Commonwealth Games

Rank	Nation	Gold	Silver	Bronze	Total
1	Canada	69	48	30	147
2	India	49	39	26	114
3	Pakistan	21	14	11	46
4	Australia	14	22	17	53
5	South Africa	13	10	11	34
6	Nigeria	12	13	24	49
7	England	5	22	42	69
8	New Zealand	3	9	18	30
9	Scotland	1	5	15	21
10	Cameroon	0	3	4	7
11	Wales	0	1	2	3
12	Cyprus	0	0	2	2
13	Northern Ireland	0	0	1	1
13	Sri Lanka	0	0	1	1
13	Zambia	0	0	1	1
13	Zimbabwe	0	0	1	1
Totals (16 entries)		187	186	206	579

== See also ==
- Badminton at the Commonwealth Games
- Athletics at the Commonwealth Games
- Tennis at the Commonwealth Games
- Gymnastics at the Commonwealth Games
