= British Wrestling Championships =

- Frequency: Annual
- Inaugurated: 1904
- Organiser: British Wrestling Association
- Website: britishwrestling.org

The British Wrestling Championships are held annually to determine the British champion. The competition is organised by the British Wrestling Association (BWA), which was founded in January 1904 as the National Amateur Wrestling Association.

== Men ==
=== Light flyweight ===
Year	Winner
1969	J Bell
1970	Don Urquhart
1971	Don Urquhart
1972	Don Urquhart
1973	Ali Eslami
1974–1976 not held
1977	Haggi Eslami
1978	Mark Dunbar

Year	Winner
1979	M. Johnson (Swe)
1980	Haggi Eslami
1981	Ray Burns
1982 not held
1983	Brian Airlie
1984	David Ogden
1985	Duncan Burns
1986	Duncan Burns

Year	Winner
1987	John Melling
1988–1989 not held
1990	Brian Airlie
1991	N. Azadani
1992	Wayne Radcliffe
Discontinued

=== Flyweight ===
Year	Winner
1935	Jimmy Crompton
1936	Bobby Gorton
1937	B. Hardy
1938	Harry Parker
1939	Harry Parker
1940	Harry Parker
1941	Harry Parker
1942 not held
1943	J. Coomber
1944	Walter McGuffie
1945	Walter McGuffie
1946	Walter McGuffie
1947 not held
1948	Harry Parker
1949	Walter McGuffie
1950	Robert Petersen (Den)
1951	Robert Petersen (Den)
1952	Walter Pilling
1953	Walter Pilling
1954	Allan Leyland
1955	Allan Leyland
1956	Allan Leyland
1957	W. Garrick
1958	Peter Christie
1959	Jock Bews
1960	Seán O'Connor (Ire)
1961	Terry Cooper
1962	Alf Rhodes
1963	Seán O'Connor
1964	Seán O'Connor
1965	Peter Bill

Year	Winner
1966	Alf Rhodes
1967	Alf Rhodes
1968	Alf Rhodes
1969	Alf Drobozski
1970	Denis Palmer
1971	Ali Eslami
1972	Derek Goold
1973	Derek Goold
1974	R. Vials
1975	Andre Drobozski
1976	Yaspel Singh
1977	Ali Eslami
1978	Yaspel Singh
1979	Mark Dunbar
1980	Mark Dunbar
1981	Haggi Eslami
1982	Haggi Eslami
1983	Yaspel Singh
1984	Gary Moores
1985	Nigel Donohue
1986	Nigel Donohue
1987	Darren Wood
1988	David Connolly
1989	D. Singh
1990	David Connolly
1991	David Connolly
1992 not held
1993	Brian Airlie
1994	Andrew Hutchinson
1995–1996 not held
1997	Sanjay Perera

Year	Winner
1998 not held
1999	Pan Abraihm
2000	William Taylor
2001	Sergelen Baatan
2002	Magid Abassi
2003	M. Panazadeh
2004	M. Panazadeh
2005	M. Aaftkari
2006	Craig Pilling
2007	Scott Gregory
2008	Craig McKenna
2009	Rafal Baron
2010	Craig McKenna
2011	Scott Gregory
2012	Krasimir Jrastanov
2013	Ross McFarlane
2014	Craig Pilling
2015	Ross McFarlane
2016	George Ramm
2017	George Ramm
2018	
2019	James Smith
2020-2021 not held (covid-19)
2022	
2023	Daniel Tiako Monthe
2024	Semo Al-Yemeni
2025	Ali Kholmamadov

=== Bantamweight ===
Year	Winner
1905	Emil Zeck
1906	William Press
1907	Edouard Kaiser
1908	Frederick Knight
1909	Burt Sansom
1910	Burt Sansom
1911	Frederick Knight
1912	H. S. How
1913	Alec Fournier
1914–1918 not held
1919	Piero Tordera
1920	Piero Tordera
1921	Piero Tordera
1922	Harold Sansom
1923	Harold Sansom
1924	Piero Tordera
1925	Harry Darby
1926	Harry Pennington
1927	Harold Sansom
1928	Harold Sansom
1929 not held
1930	Joe Reid
1931	Joe Reid
1932	Joe Reid
1933	Joe Reid
1934	Joe Reid
1935	Joe Reid
1936	Ray Cazaux
1937	Ray Cazaux
1938	Tom Eastell
1939	Ray Cazaux
1940	Ray Cazaux
1941	Ray Cazaux
1942	Les Dimmock
1943	J. Parker
1944	Arnold Parsons
1945	Arnold Parsons
1946	Arnold Parsons
1947	Harry Parker
1948	Ray Cazaux
1949	Ken Irvine

Year	Winner
1950	Ronnie Gilderdale
1951	Les Cheetham
1952	Ken Irvine
1953	Ken Irvine
1954	William Parker
1955	Vic Pembridge
1956	William Parker
1957	Walter Pilling
1958	Jim Turnbull
1959	Walter Pilling
1960	Walter Pilling
1961	Ken Irvine
1962	Walter Pilling
1963	F. Chardhie (Iran)
1964	Walter Pilling
1965	Dennis Gilligan
1966	Andy Bailey
1967	Dennis Gilligan
1968	Dennis Gilligan
1969	Terry Robinson
1970	Terry Robinson
1971	Amrik Singh Gill
1972	Amrik Singh Gill
1973	Amrik Singh Gill
1974	Derek Goold
1975	Amrik Singh Gill
1976	Amrik Singh Gill
1977	Amrik Singh Gill
1978	Amrik Singh Gill
1979	Neil McKay
1980	Amrik Singh Gill
1981	Brian Aspen
1982	Brian Aspen
1983	Brian Aspen
1984	Christoff St. John
1985	Gary Moores
1986	David Ogden
1987	Barry Cooper
1988	Christoff St. John
1989	R. Hafner (Swi)
1990	Paul Morris

Year	Winner
1991	Darren Rigby
1992	Paul Morris
1993	D. Singh Harvinder
1994	Darren Rigby
1995	Adam Toole
1996	Eissa Bakshayeh
1997	Lasantha Fernando
1998	Paul Stridgeon
1999	Paul Stridgeon
2000	James Crowe
2001	Andrew Hutchinson
2002	Viorel Etko
2003	Viorel Etko
2004	Viorel Etko
2005	Viorel Etko
2006	Krasimir Krastanov
2007	Viorel Etko
2008	Krasimir Krastanov
2009	Krasimir Krastanov
2010	Krasimir Krastanov
2011	Krasimir Krastanov
2012	Sasha Madyarchyk
2013	Sasha Madyarchyk
2014	Sasha Madyarchyk
2015	Gheorghita Tanasa
2016	Viorel Etko
2017 not held
2018	
2019	Ross Connelly
2020-2021 not held (covid-19)
2022	
2023	Haroon Yousufi
2024	Haroon Yousufi
2025	Haroon Yousufi

=== Featherweight ===
Year	Winner
1905	John Slim
1906	Tom Davis
1907	John Slim
1908	James Webster
1909	Frederick Knight
1910	Percy Cockings
1911	Percy Cockings
1912	Percy Cockings
1913	Percy Cockings
1914	George Stott
1915–1918 not held
1919	George Stott
1920	R. Jaquinoud
1921	George MacKenzie
1922	George MacKenzie
1923	Bill Waltham
1924	George MacKenzie
1925	W. Schneeberger
1926	George MacKenzie
1927	A. Munroe
1928	Harold Angus
1929	Harold Sansom
1930	Joe Taylor
1931	Joe Taylor
1932	Joe Taylor
1933	Norman Morrell
1934	Norman Morrell
1935	Norman Morrell
1936	Norman Morrell
1937	Joe Taylor
1938	Tom Taylor
1939	Albert Harman
1940	D. Hill
1941	D. Hill
1942	Les Dimmock
1943	Les Dimmock
1944	Les Dimmock
1945	Les Dimmock
1946	Les Dimmock
1947	Joe Taylor
1948	Arnold Parsons

Year	Winner
1949	Ray Cazaux
1950	Ray Cazaux
1951	Herbie Hall
1952	Herbie Hall
1953	Herbie Hall
1954	Herbie Hall
1955	Herbie Hall
1956	Herbie Hall
1957	Herbie Hall
1958	Bert Aspen
1959	David Allpress
1960	Bert Aspen
1961	Herbie Hall
1962	Alf Catona
1963	Herbie Hall
1964	Bert Aspen
1965	Tony McLoughlin (Ire)
1966	Bert Aspen
1967	Bert Aspen
1968	John McCourtney
1969	Kenny Dawes
1970	Kenny Dawes
1971	Terry Brett
1972	Alan Crompton
1973	Paule Toole
1974	Hugh McAree
1975	Josh Henson (USA)
1976	Kenny Dawes
1977	Mohammed Nazir
1978	Mohammed Nazir
1979	Brian Aspen
1980	Brian Aspen
1981	Steve Bayliss
1982	Mark Dunbar
1983	Gavin Beswick
1984	Brian Aspen
1985	Mark Dunbar
1986	Brian Aspen
1987	Ravinder Singh
1988	Ravinder Singh
1989	Brian Aspen

Year	Winner
1990	John Melling
1991	John Melling
1992	John Melling
1993	Nigel Donohue
1994	John Melling
1995	Kenny Devoy
1996	Jim Breen
1997	Mahmoud Ramazani
1998	Mahmoud Ramazani
1999	Fardin Paymen
2000	Fardin Paymen
2001	Hassan Ziyaee
2002	Mohammed Osman
2003	Mohammed Osman
2004	S. Samsung
2005	Zhivko Stoyanov
2006	Mike Grundy
2007	Philip Roberts
2008	Maksym Matus (Ukr)
2009	Sasha Madyarchyk
2010	Bec-khan Aldamov
2011	Alex Gladkov
2012	Philip Roberts
2013	Alex Gladkov
2014	Philip Roberts
2015	Kane Charig
2016	Hamid Shadravan
2017	Charlie Bowling
2018	Ranvir Singh Sandhu
2019	George Ramm
2020-2021 not held (covid-19)
2022	
2023	Ross Connelly
2024	Chedli Methlouthi
2025	Parvesh Sheoran

=== Lightweight ===
Year	Winner
1904	E. Graham
1905	Edouard J. Sermier
1906	Henry Bailie
1907	George de Relwyskow
1908	George de Relwyskow
1909	George Mackenzie
1910	R. Wheeler
1911	Stanley Bacon
1912	George Mackenzie
1913	Henry Oberholzer
1914	A. E. Gould
1915–1918 not held
1919	Vic Benson
1920	Vic Benson
1921	Vic Benson
1922	George Mackenzie
1923	Cecil Edwin Bacon
1924	George Mackenzie
1925	Vic Benson
1926	Vic Benson
1927	Robert Cook
1928	R. Irvine
1929	Reginald Edwards
1930	Reginald Edwards
1931	Harold Stone
1932	George Mackenzie
1933	Arthur Thompson
1934	Arthur Thompson
1935	Arthur Thompson
1936	Arthur Thompson
1937	Arthur Thompson
1938	Arthur Thompson
1939	Arthur Thompson
1940	Arthur Thompson
1941	George Mackenzie
1942	Harry Jones
1943	Harry Jones
1944	Harry Jones
1945	A. Ward
1946	Harry Jones
1947	Ray Myland
1948	Peter Luck
1949	Jack Vard (Ire)
1950	Ernst Ostrand (Den)
1951	Jack Vard (Ire)
1952	Ray Myland
1953	Dave Ickringill
1954	Tadeusz Zacharek
1955	Peter Luck
1956	Jack Taylor
1957	George McKenzie
1958	Herbie Hall
1959	Herbie Hall
1960	Kenny Stephenson
1961	Bert Aspen
1962	Peter Amey

Year	Winner
1963	Gordon Hill
1964	Anwar Mohammad
1965	Kenny Stephenson
1966	Kenny Stephenson
1967	Stan Gilligan
1968	Rodger Till
1969	Stan Gilligan
1970	Joe Kelliher
1971	Kenny Dawes
1972	Joe Kelliher
1973	Joey Gilligan
1974	Joey Gilligan
1975	Joey Gilligan
1976	Joey Gilligan
1977	Kenny Dawes
1978	Joey Gilligan
1979	Fitz Walker
1980	Joey Gilligan
1981	Gavin Beswick
1982	Joey Gilligan
1983	Steve Bayliss
1984	Steve Bayliss
1985	Steve Bayliss
1986	Steve Bayliss
1987	M. Mioroskaw
1988	M. Mioroskaw
1989	Ravinder Singh
1990	Phil Keech
1991	Calum McNeil
1992	Calum McNeil
1993	Jim Breen
1994	Brian Aspen
1995	M. Wachter (Ger)
1996	Jesse Bradbury
1997	John Melling
1998	John Melling
1999	Farzad Pashaei
2000	Wesley Roche
2001	John Melling
2002–2014 not held
2015	Ian Saculton
2016	Philip Roberts
2017 not held
2018	
2019	Charlie Bowling
2020-2021 not held (covid-19)
2022	
2023	Micah Naisbet
2024	Mojtaba Fathizadeh
2025	Csaba Uveges

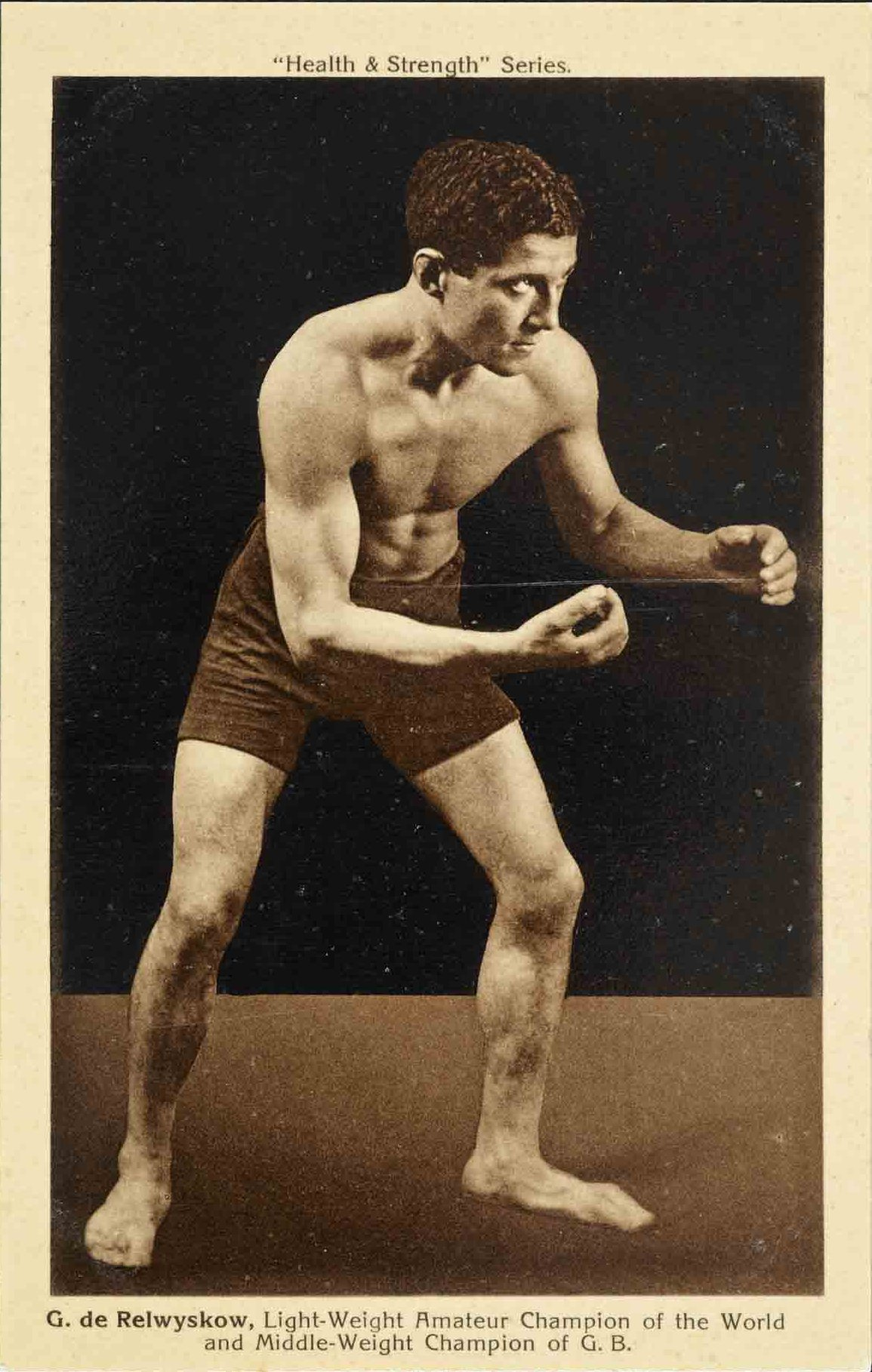
George de Relwyskow, lightweight and middleweight champion in 1907 and 1908

=== Welterweight ===
Year	Winner
1922	J. Davis
1923	J. Davis
1924	Stanley Bacon
1925	Vic Benson
1926	Vic Benson
1927	Vic Benson
1928	Reg Cook
1929	Reginald Edwards
1930	Len Cotland
1931	D. Rowe
1932	Ron Johnson
1933	Lionel Wills
1934	Bill Fox
1935	Maurice Allwood
1936	Bill Fox
1937	Bill Fox
1938	Les Herbert
1939	Les Herbert
1940	Tom Baldwin
1941	N. Groom
1942	S. R. Dowsett
1943	Albert Jones
1944	Albert Jones
1945	D. Straker
1946	Don Irvine
1947	Don Irvine
1948	Don Irvine
1949	Don Irvine
1950	Don Irvine
1951	Ray Myland
1952	Don Irvine
1953	George Farquhar
1954	J. Stephens
1955	Dave Ickringill
1956	Mat Pretorius
1957	Joe Feeney (Ire)

Year	Winner
1958	Joe Feeney (Ire)
1959	Joe Feeney (Ire)
1960	Joe Feeney (Ire)
1961	Peter Amey
1962	Joe Feeney (Ire)
1963	J. Barnaville
1964	Joe Feeney (Ire)
1965	Joe Feeney (Ire)
1966	Joe Feeney (Ire)
1967	Peter Amey
1968	Joe Feeney (Ire)
1969	Peter Amey
1970	Peter Amey
1971	Tony Shacklady
1972	Tony Shacklady
1973	Des Lloyd
1974	R. Buck
1975	Keith Haward
1976	Keith Haward
1977	Keith Haward
1978	Keith Haward
1979	Joey Gilligan
1980	Fitz Walker
1981	Fitz Walker
1982	Fitz Walker
1983	Fitz Walker
1984	Fitz Walker
1985	Fitz Walker
1986	Fitz Walker
1987	Fitz Walker
1988	Fitz Walker
1989	Fitz Walker
1990	Fitz Walker
1991	Fitz Walker
1992	Fitz Walker
1993	Shane Rigby

Year	Winner
1994	Calum McNeil
1995	Jahanashah Saidi
1996	Malcolm Spencer
1997	Thomas Coppola
1998	Thomas Coppola
1999	Thomas Coppola
2000	John Melling
2001	Jesse Bradbury
2002	Nate Ackerman
2003	Jim Meideros (USA)
2004	Nate Ackerman
2005	Mohammed Osman
2006	Myroslav Dykun
2007	Myroslav Dykun
2008	Mohammad Ali
2009	Myroslav Dykun
2010	Philip Roberts
2011	Philip Roberts
2012	Mohammed Osman
2013	Philip Roberts
2014	Mike Grundy
2015	Nicolae Cojocaru
2016	Nicolae Cojocaru
2017	Nicolae Cojocaru
2018	Nicolae Cojocaru
2019	Curtis Dodge
2020-2021 not held (covid-19)
2022	
2023	Farhad Nouri
2024	Farhad Nouri
2025	Farhad Nouri

=== Light middleweight 79kg ===
Year	Winner
2019	Daniel Sartakov
2020-2021 not held (covid-19)

Year	Winner
2022	
2023	Ivan Enchev

Year	Winner
2024	Mazyar Yari
2025	Darragh Love

=== Middleweight ===
Year	Winner
1906	Charles Spinner
1907	George de Relwyskow
1908	George de Relwyskow
1909	Billy Wood
1910	J. Furr
1911	Stanley Bacon
1912	Stanley Bacon
1913	Stanley Bacon
1914–1918 not held
1919	Norman Jackson
1920	Norman Jackson
1921	J. Davis
1922	G. Wilson
1923	G. Wilson
1924	Stanley Bacon
1925	Stanley Bacon
1926	Vic Benson
1927	Edgar Bacon
1928	Reg Cook
1929	Bernard Rowe
1930	Stan Bissell
1931	Bernard Rowe
1932	Bernard Rowe
1933	Eddie Craven
1934	Stan Bissell
1935	Stan Bissell
1936	Les Jeffers
1937	Les Jeffers
1938	Stan Bissell
1939	Les Jeffers
1940	Les Herbert
1941	Tom Baldwin
1942	Tom Baldwin
1943	Fred Darkus
1944	Tom Baldwin
1945	Tom Baldwin
1946	Tom Baldwin
1947	Johnny Sullivan (Ire)
1948	Tom Baldwin
1949	Don Irvine
1950	C. Schadd (Swi)

Year	Winner
1951	Tom Baldwin
1952	Tom Baldwin
1953	Harry Kendall
1954	Harry Kendall
1955	George Farquhar
1956	George Farquhar
1957	George Farquhar
1958	Ray Myland
1959	Frank Lee
1960	Alan Butts
1961	Tofigh Jahanbakht (Iran)
1962	Ron Grinstead
1963	George Farquhar
1964	Tom Wood
1965	Geoff Hill
1966	Wally Booth
1967	Wally Booth
1968	Ron Grinstead
1969	Tony Shacklady
1970	Ron Grinstead
1971	Ronnie Mitchell
1972	Richard Barraclough
1973	Charlie Kelly
1974	Charlie Kelly
1975	Charlie Kelly
1976	Michael Nylin (USA)
1977	Joe Kelliher
1978	Ivan Weir
1979	B. Rhodin (Swe)
1980	Ivan Weir
1981	Stefan Kurpas
1982	Stefan Kurpas
1983	Dave Keech
1984	Stefan Kurpas
1985	Stefan Kurpas
1986	Paul Beattie
1987	Francois Rossouw
1988	Martin Doyle (Ire)
1989	Paul Beattie
1990	Shaun Morley
1991	Martin Doyle (Ire)

Year	Winner
1992	Shaun Morley
1993	Shaun Morley
1994	Gurchetan Singh Kooner
1995	Halil Yildrim
1996	Jahanshah Saidi
1997	Mohammed Umar
1998	Gurchetan Singh Kooner
1999	Gurchetan Singh Kooner
2000	Thomas Coppola
2001	Sharlorous Kamal
2002	Joseph Bianco
2003	Eric Ciake
2004	Artur Skodtaev (Rus)
2005	Arish Skogh
2006	M. Usman
2007	Mohammadali Haghighatdoust
2008	Oleg Druzhynets
2009	Masoud Yosefi
2010	Jamshid Yarashev
2011	Jamshid Yarashev
2012	Oleg Druzhynets
2013	Alex Dolly
2014	Amir Reza Ghasemikia
2015	Amir Reza Ghasemikia
2016	Amir Reza Ghasemikia
2017	Amir Reza Ghasemikia
2018	
2019	Ryan Loder
2020-2021 not held (covid-19)
2022	
2023	Siavash Hatamvand
2024	John Viruet
2025	John Emmanuel

=== Light heavyweight ===
Year	Winner
1922	Noel Rhys
1923	Noel Rhys
1924	Edgar Bacon
1925	Edgar Bacon
1926	Vic Benson
1927	Edgar Bacon
1928	Bernard Rowe
1929	Bernard Rowe
1930	Reg Cook
1931	Reg Cook
1932	Reg Cook
1933	Bernard Rowe
1934	Stan Bissell
1935	Stan Bissell
1936	Tom Ward
1937	Tom Ward
1938	J. Nelson
1939	Stan Bissell
1940	Les Jeffers
1941	Les Jeffers
1942	G. Charlton
1943	Tom Ward
1944	John Boyle
1945	Johnny Sullivan (Ire)
1946	Johnny Sullivan (Ire)
1947	Johnny Sullivan (Ire)
1948	Johnny Sullivan (Ire)
1949	Len Pidduck
1950	Ken Richmond

Year	Winner
1951	Don Irvine
1952	Ian Bankier
1953	Ian Bankier
1954	Harold Hall
1955	D. Eichenberger
1956	Gerry Martina (Ire)
1957	Billy Robinson
1958	Harry Kendall
1959	Harold Hall
1960	Joe Maleczky (Aut)
1961	Joe Maleczky (Aut)
1962	Tony Buck
1963	Tony Buck
1964	Wally Booth
1965	Tony Buck
1966	Geoff Hill
1967	D. Walsh
1968	Tony McConnell
1969	C. Martin
1970	Richard Barraclough
1971	Richard Barraclough
1972	Ron Grinstead
1973	Maurice Allan
1974	Maurice Allan
1975	Maurice Allan
1976	Maurice Allan
1977	Steve Greig (Nzl)
1978	Steve Greig (Nzl)
1979	Scott Murray

Year	Winner
1980	Keith Peache
1981	Douglas Borthwick
1982	Ivan Weir
1983	W. Webb
1984	Noel Loban
1985	Chris Manning
1986	Graeme English
1987	Graeme English
1988	Graeme English
1989	Amarjit Singh
1990	Graeme English
1991	Shaun Morley
1992	Graeme English
1993	Faramarz Zandieh
1994	Graeme English
1995	Sergio Grecco (Ita)
1996	Johannes Rossouw
1997-2017 not held
2019	Benjamin Neal
2020-2021 not held (covid-19)
2022	
2023	Vasile Jardan
2024	Syerus Eslami
2025	Syerus Eslami

=== Heavyweight ===
Year	Winner
1969	Geoff Hill
1970	Geoff Hill
1971	Bob Page
1972	Willie Robertson
1973	Ian Duncan
1974	Keith Peache
1975	Keith Peache
1976	Ajib Singh (Ind)
1977	Keith Peache
1978	Keith Peache
1979	Ian Duncan
1980	Ian Duncan
1981	Keith Peache
1982	Keith Peache
1983	Noel Loban
1984	Keith Peache
1985	Keith Peache
1986	Noel Loban
1987	Noel Loban
1988	Noel Loban

Year	Winner
1989	Graeme English
1990	Amarjit Singh
1991	B. Wallen
1992	Imran Butt
1993	Graeme English
1994	Noel Loban
1995	Joe Mossford
1996	Doug Thompson
1997	Doug Thompson
1998	Johannes Rossouw
1999	Johannes Rossouw
2000	Kevin Campbell
2001	Behzad Asgarifard
2002	Johannes Rossouw
2003	Sunday Opiah
2004	Sunday Opiah
2005	A. Madzigov
2006	A. Madzigov
2007	Ali Rahmati
2008	Leon Rattigan

Year	Winner
2009	Leon Rattigan
2010	Leon Rattigan
2011	Amir Solamani
2012	Leon Rattigan
2013	Leon Rattigan
2014	Andrew Downs
2015	Veton Kurshumliju
2016	Krasimir Mitkov
2017	Joe Hendry
2018	
2019	Ash Roden
2020-2021 not held (covid-19)
2022	Cameron Nicol
2023	Youcef Ben Hagouga
2024	Adam Berry
2025	Imomali Abdulloev

=== Super heavyweight ===
Year	Winner
1904	Thomas Brown
1905	Frederick Beck
1906	Frederick Beck
1907	George O'Kelly
1908	Edward Barrett
1909	Aubrey Coleman
1910	Stanley Bacon
1911	Edward Barrett
1912	Noel Rhys
1913	William West
1914–1918 not held
1919	A. Chappuis
1920	Noel Rhys
1921	J. Davis
1922	G. Wilson
1923	G. Wilson
1924	Vic Benson
1925	Guillermo Estelles
1926	Albert Sangwine
1927	Ernest Bacon
1928	Frank Angel
1929	Bernard Rowe
1930	Arthur C. Edwards
1931	Arthur C. Edwards
1932	Stan Bissell
1933	Stan Bissell
1934	Stan Bissell
1935	Arthur C. Edwards
1936	Archie Dudgeon
1937	Archie Dudgeon
1938	Arthur C. Edwards
1939	Fred Oberlander
1940	Fred Oberlander
1941	Fred Oberlander
1942	Fred Oberlander
1943	Fred Oberlander
1944	Fred Oberlander
1945	Fred Oberlander
1946	J. Taylor
1947	Johnny Sullivan (Ire)
1948	Fred Oberlander
1949	Ken Richmond

Year	Winner
1950	Ken Richmond
1951	Len Pidduck
1952	Ken Richmond
1953	Ken Richmond
1954	Ken Richmond
1955	Ken Richmond
1956	Ken Richmond
1957	Tony Buck
1958	Ken Richmond
1959	Ken Richmond
1960	Ken Richmond
1961	Tony Buck
1962	Denis McNamara
1963	Denis McNamara
1964	E. Watson
1965	Pat Sheeran (Ire)
1966	Tony Buck
1967	Denis McNamara
1968	Denis McNamara
1969	Wally Booth
1970	Denis McNamara
1971	Willie Robertson
1972	Denis McNamara
1973	Willie Robertson
1974	Bob Bradley
1975	Bob Bradley
1976	Bob Bradley
1977	Bob Bradley
1978	Bob Bradley
1979	Matthew Clempner
1980	Matthew Clempner
1981	Albert Patrick
1982	Bob Bradley
1983	Keith Peache
1984	Albert Patrick
1985	Albert Patrick
1986	Keith Peache
1987	Dave Kilpin
1988	Albert Patrick
1989	Matthew Clempner
1990	Matthew Clempner
1991	Amarjit Singh

Year	Winner
1992	Amarjit Singh
1993	Amarjit Singh
1994	Amarjit Singh
1995	Amarjit Singh
1996	Amarjit Singh
1997	Amarjit Singh
1998	Amarjit Singh
1999	Amarjit Singh
2000	Graeme English
2001	Amarjit Singh
2002	Douglas Thomson
2003	Baljit Singh
2004	F. Agunmenowgi
2005	Chinu Sandhu
2006	Sunday Opiah
2007	Sunday Opiah
2008	B. Kooner
2009	Chinu Sandhu
2010	Mark Cocker
2011	P. Faziollahi
2012	Chinu Sandhu
2013	Mark Cocker
2014	Chinu Sandhu
2015	Chinu Sandhu
2016	C. Osei-Bonsu
2017	Mark Cocker
2018	
2019	Mojtaba Mirzaee
2020-2021 not held (covid-19)
2022	Popa Tudor
2023	Popa Tudor
2024	Mehdi Zoodashna
2025	Mehdi Zoodashna
