= Stan Gilligan =

English wrestler (1928–2020)

Personal information
- Nationality: British (English)
- Born: 1928 Salford, England
- Died: 9 April 2020 (aged 91) Chorlton-on-Medlock, Manchester, England

Sport
- Sport: Amateur wrestling
- Event: Lightweight
- Club: Barton Athletic Club

Stanley "Stan" Gilligan (1928 – 9 April 2020) was a wrestler who competed for England.

== Biography ==
Gilligan was a member of the Barton Athletic Club and was a two-times winner of the British Wrestling Championships in 1967 and 1969. He retired after the 1968 season

Gilligan represented the England team at the 1966 British Empire and Commonwealth Games in Kingston, Jamaica, where he participated in 68 kg lightweight category.

His son Joey Gilligan and his brother Dennis Gilligan were also England international wrestlers.

Stan Gilligan died from COVID-19 in Chorlton-on-Medlock, Manchester, on 9 April 2020, at the age of 91.
