= Allan Leyland =

British

Personal information
- Nationality: British (English)
- Born: c.1934 Bolton, England
- Died: 17 April 2008 (aged 74) Bolton, England

Sport
- Sport: Wrestling
- Event: Flyweight
- Club: Bolton Harriers

Allan Leyland (1934 – 17 April 2008) was a male wrestler who competed for England.

== Biography ==
Leyland represented the English team at the 1954 British Empire and Commonwealth Games held in Vancouver, Canada, where he participated in the flyweight category.

Leyland was a three-times winner of the British Wrestling Championships in 1954, 1955 and 1956.
