= Ashley Booth =

Scottish footballer

Personal information
- Date of birth: 22 October 1937
- Place of birth: Aberdeen, Scotland
- Date of death: 23 March 2014 (aged 76)
- Position: Wing half

Youth career
- Banks o' Dee

Senior career*
Years	Team	Apps	(Gls)
1962–1965	St Johnstone	29	(0)
1965–1966	East Fife	1	(0)
Total		30	(0)
- * Club domestic league appearances and goals

Ashley Booth (22 October 1937 – 23 March 2014) was a Scottish footballer.

== Biography ==
Booth was a member of a well-known Aberdeen sporting family. His brother Wallace Booth won a Commonwealth Games silver medal in wrestling and another brother Sandy was a golfer.

Booth is best known for his time at St Johnstone where he made 36 appearances for the Perth club from 1962 to 1965. Booth then moved on to East Fife where he made a handful of appearances before suffering serious ligament damage while playing against Dumbarton at Boghead which ultimately ended his playing career.
