= Craig McKenna =

Scottish freestyle wrestler (born 1991)

Personal information
- Nationality: British (Scottish)
- Born: 5 February 1991 (age 35) Glasgow, Scotland

Sport
- Sport: Amateur wrestling
- Event: Flyweight

Craig McKenna (born 5 February 1991) is a Scottish freestyle wrestler.

== Biography ==
Born in Glasgow, Scotland, he represented Scotland at the 2010 Commonwealth Games, in New Delhi, India, in the 55 kg category placing 7th.

McKenna was a two-times winner of the British Wrestling Championships in 2008 and 2010.

== Achievements ==
Year	Tournament	Place	Weight class
2011	World Freestyle Wrestling Championships	24th	55 kg
2010	Commonwealth Games	7th	55 kg
2008	Commonwealth Youth Games	3rd	50 kg
