= Joe Feeney (wrestler) =

Irish wrestler (1937–2026)

Personal information
- Nationality: Irish
- Born: 28 February 1937 Dublin, Ireland
- Died: 1 September 2026 (aged 89) Dublin, Ireland
- Height: 175 cm (5 ft 9 in)
- Weight: 73 kg (161 lb)

Sport
- Sport: Wrestling

Joseph Feeney (28 February 1937 – 1 September 2026) was an Irish wrestler. He competed at the 1960 Summer Olympics and the 1964 Summer Olympics.

Feeney was a nine-times winner of the British Wrestling Championships at welterweight in 1957, 1958, 1959, 1960, 1962, 1964, 1965, 1966 and 1968. He died in Dublin on 1 September 2026, at the age of 89.
