= Piero Tordera =

Italian wrestler

Personal information
- Born: 1885
- Died: Unknown
- Height: 163 cm (5 ft 4 in)

Piero Tordera (born 1885, date of death unknown) was an Italian wrestler. He competed in the freestyle bantamweight event at the 1924 Summer Olympics.

Tordera lived in London and worked at The Piccadilly Hotel. He was a four-times bantamweight champion at the British Wrestling Championships.
