= Fred Oberlander =

Austrian/British/Canadian wrestler (1911–1996)

Personal information
- Nationality: Austrian, British, Canadian
- Born: 23 May 1911 Vienna, Austria
- Died: 6 July 1996 (aged 85) Montreal, Canada

Sport
- Sport: Amateur wrestling
- Event: Heavyweight
Medal record
Men's freestyle wrestling
Representing Canada
Maccabiah Games
Gold medal – first place	1953 Israel	Heavyweight

Fred B. Oberlander (23 May 1911 – 6 July 1996) was an Austrian born wrestler who represented Great Britain and Canada. He competed at 1948 Summer Olympics.

== Biography ==
Oberlander was born in Vienna, Austria. After winning the World Championships in 1935, Oberlander was offered a chance to compete for Austria at the 1936 Summer Olympics in Nazi Germany, but declined.

Living in England at the time, he fought in Cornish wrestling tournaments in the 1940s and represented Great Britain as the wrestling team captain at the 1948 Olympic Games in London. He was an eight-times winner of the British Wrestling Championships at heavyweight from 1939 to 1945 and 1948.

Oberlander later emigrated to Canada, where he founded the Canadian Maccabi Association. He won a silver medal in wrestling at the 1950 Maccabiah Games, and the heavyweight wrestling title at the 1953 Maccabiah Games and was named Outstanding Jewish World Athlete.

Oberlander was named to the International Jewish Sports Hall of Fame in 1991.

== Family ==
His son Ron served as president and CEO of Abitibi Consolidated. His son Philip followed in his father's footsteps, wrestling as a welterweight in the 1964 Tokyo Olympics, but did not win a medal.

== See also ==
- List of select Jewish wrestlers
