= David Ickringill =

English wrestler (1930-2012)

Personal information
- Nationality: British (English)
- Born: Third quarter 1930 Keighley, West Yorkshire, England
- Died: 6 June 2012 (aged 81) Richmond, North Yorkshire, England

Sport
- Sport: Wrestling
- Event: Lightweight
- Club: Keighley Airedale; Manco AWC, Stretford

David Ickringill (1930 – 6 June 2012), was a male wrestler who competed for England at two British Empire Games (now Commonwealth Games).

== Biography ==
While a member of the Manco AWC in Stretford, Ickringill represented the England team in the -68 kg division at the 1950 British Empire Games in Auckland, New Zealand. During the Games in 1950 he lived at Well Street, Keighley and was a decorator by trade.

He represented the English team at the 1950 British Empire Games in Auckland, New Zealand, where he finished fourth in the Lightweight 68kg category.

Eight years later he represented England in the -74 kg division at the 1958 British Empire and Commonwealth Games in Cardiff, Wales.

Ickringill was a two-times winner of the British Wrestling Championships in 1953 and 1955.
