= Kenneth Dawes =

British wrestler (born 1947)

Kenny Dawes
Personal information
- Nationality: British (English)
- Born: 17 January 1947 (age 79) Islington, London, England

Sport
- Sport: Wrestling

Kenneth "Kenny" George Dawes (born 17 January 1947) is a retired British wrestler. He competed at the 1972 Summer Olympics and the 1976 Summer Olympics.

== Biography ==
Dawes represented England in the -62 kg featherweight division, at the 1970 British Commonwealth Games in Edinburgh, Scotland.

Dawes was a five-times winner of the British Wrestling Championships in 1969, 1970, 1971, 1976 and 1977.
