= Matthew Clempner =

British wrestler (born 1956)

Personal information
- Nationality: British (English)
- Born: 20 May 1956 (age 70) Salford, England
- Height: 205 cm (6 ft 9 in)
- Weight: 100 kg (220 lb)

Sport
- Sport: Wrestling

Matthew Spencer Clempner (born 20 May 1956) is a British former wrestler who competed at the 1980 Summer Olympics.

== Biography ==
At the 1980 Olympic Games in Moscow, Clempner participated in the men's freestyle +100 kg event.

Clempner was a four-times winner of the British Wrestling Championships at heavyweight in 1979, 1980, 1989 and 1990.

Clempner ran the Bolton Judokwai in the Horwich Leisure Centre and was the UK Judo North West area technical director. His son Matt Clempner is a three times champion of Great Britain, winning the heavyweight division at the British Judo Championships in 2007, 2011 and 2012.
