= Don Irvine (wrestler) =

British wrestler

Personal information
- Nationality: British (English)
- Born: 4 April 1921 Islington, London] England
- Died: 14 July 1973 (aged 52) Lambeth, London, England

Sport
- Sport: Amateur wrestling
- Club: Ashdown AC, Islington

Donald "Don" Ralph Irvine (4 April 1921 – 14 July 1973) was a British wrestler. He competed at the 1948 Summer Olympics and the 1952 Summer Olympics.

Irvine was an eight-times winner of the British Wrestling Championships, at welterweight in 1946, 1947, 1948, 1949, 1950 and 1952, at middleweight in 1949 and light-heavyweight in 1951.
