= Wrestling at the 1950 British Empire Games =

- Venue: Auckland Town Hall (Great Hall)
- Location: Auckland, New Zealand
- Dates: 4 – 11 February 1950

Wrestling at the 1950 British Empire Games was the fourth appearance of Wrestling at the Commonwealth Games.

The sport featured contests in eight weight classes and the events were held in the Great Hall of the Auckland Town Hall, which had a capacity of 3,000 for the events. Wrestlers in each weight division would compete in a round-robin to determine final positions.

Australia topped the wrestling medal table with three gold medals.

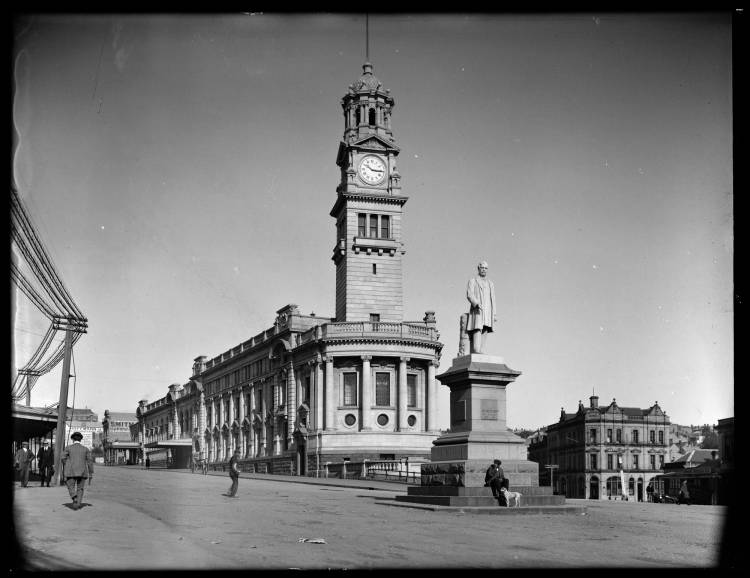
The Auckland Town Hall was the venue for the boxing

== Medal table ==
* Host nation (New Zealand)

Medals won by nation with totals, ranked by number of golds—sortable
Rank	Nation	Gold	Silver	Bronze	Total
1	Australia (AUS)	3	3	1	7
2	New Zealand (NZL)*	2	3	1	6
3	Canada (CAN)	2	2	0	4
4	South Africa (SAF)	1	0	2	3
5	England (ENG)	0	0	2	2
Totals (5 entries)		8	8	6	22

== Medallists ==
Event	Gold	Silver	Bronze
Flyweight 52kg	Bert Harris (AUS)	Eric Matthews (NZL)	none awarded
Bantamweight 57kg	Douglas Mudgway (NZL)	Jim Chapman (AUS)	none awarded
Featherweight 62kg	John Armitt (NZL)	Roland Milord (CAN)	Arnold Parsons (ENG)
Lightweight 68kg	Dick Garrard (AUS)	Morgan Plumb (CAN)	Gordon Hobson (NZL)
Welterweight 74kg	Henry Hudson (CAN)	Jack Little (AUS)	Martin Jooste (SAF)
Middleweight 82kg	Maurice Vachon (CAN)	Bruce Arthur (AUS)	Callie Reitz (SAF)
Light heavyweight 90kg	Pat Morton (SAF)	Arthur Sneddon (NZL)	Tom Trevaskis (AUS)
Heavyweight 100kg	Jim Armstrong (AUS)	Pat O'Connor (NZL)	Kenneth Richmond (ENG)

== Results ==
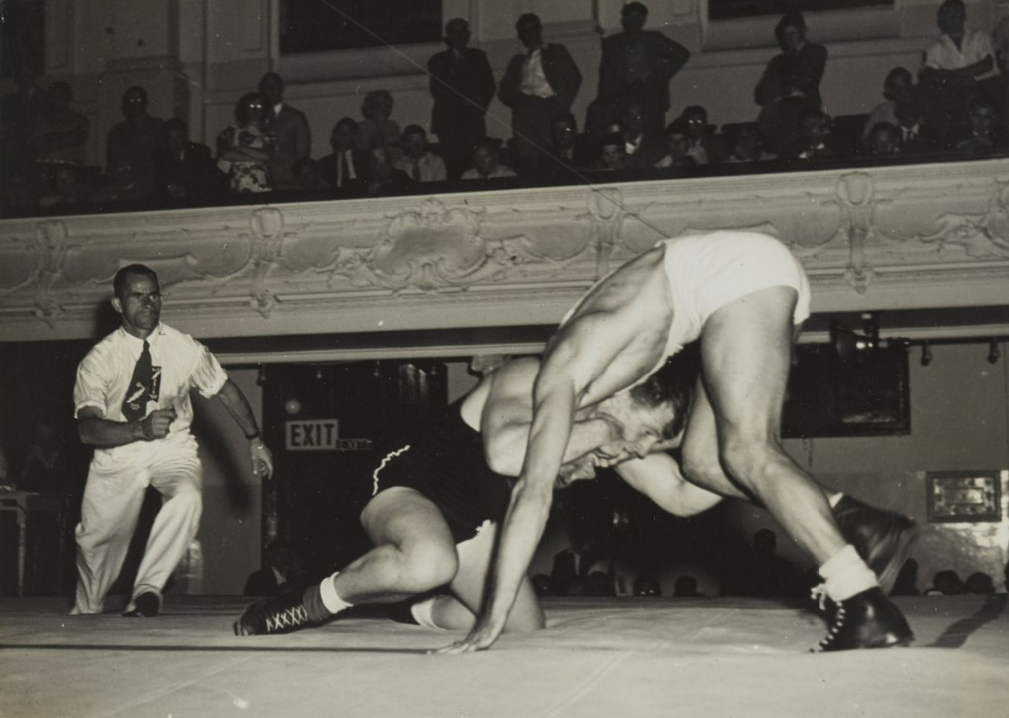
Patrick O'Connor and Kenneth Richmond battle for the silver medal Auckland Libraries Heritage Collections

There were only two competitors in the flyweight and bantamweight divisions.

=== Flyweight 52kg ===
Winner	Loser	Score
Bert Harris (AUS)	Eric Matthews (NZL)	fall

=== Bantamweight 57kg ===
Winner	Loser	Score
Douglas Mudgway (NZL)	James Alexander Chapman (AUS)	fall

=== Featherweight 62kg ===
Winner	Loser	Score
John Armitt (NZL)	Arnold Parsons (ENG)	points
Roland Milord (CAN)	Eric Roland Hayman (AUS)	points
Milford	Parsons	split
Armitt	Hayman	points
Parsons	Hayman	?
Armitt	Milford	points

Final positions: 1. Armitt 2. Milford 3. Parsons 4. Hayman

=== Lightweight 68kg ===
Winner	Loser	Score
Dick Garrard (AUS)	Gordon Hobson (NZL)	fall
Morgan Plumb (CAN)	David Ickringill (ENG)	fall
Plumb	Hobson	points
Garrad	Ickringill	fall
Hobson	Ickringill	w/o failed weight
Garrad	Plumb	fall

Final positions: 1. Garrad 2. Plumb 3. Hobson 4. Ickringill

=== Welterweight 74kg ===
Winner	Loser	Score
Henry Hudson (CAN)	Martin Jooste (SAF)	points
John David Cobain Little (AUS)	Jack Monaghan (NZL)	fall
Little	George Henry (SCO)	fall
Hudson	Monaghan	fall
Jooste	Monaghan	?
Hudson	Henry	?
Little	Jooste	points
Henry	Monaghan	?
Jooste	Henry	fall
Hudson	Little	split

Final positions: 1. Hudson 2. Little 3. Jooste 4. Henry 5. Monaghan

=== Middleweight 82kg ===
Winner	Loser	Score
Maurice Vachon (CAN)	Peter Fletcher (NZL)	fall
Bruce Arthur (AUS)	Eddie Bowey (ENG)	points
Arthur	Callie Reitz (SAF)	points
Fletcher	Bowey	points
Vachon	Reitz	points
Arthur	Fletcher	fall
Vachon	Bowey	?
Bowey	Fletcher	?
Reitz	Fletcher	?
Vachon	Arthur	points

Final positions: 1. Vachon 2. Arthur 3. Reitz 4. Bowey 5. Fletcher

=== Light heavyweight 90kg ===
Winner	Loser	Score
Pat Morton (SAF)	Thomas Richard Trevaskis (AUS)	points
Arthur Sneddon (NZL)	F Payette (CAN)	w/o failed medical
Sneddon	Trevaskis	points
Morton	Payette	w/o
Trevaskis	Payette	w/o
Morton	Sneddon	fall

Final positions: 1. Morton 2. Sneddon 3. Trevaskis 4. Payette

=== Heavyweight 100kg ===
Winner	Loser	Score
Jim Armstrong (AUS)	Pat O'Connor (NZL)	fall
Kenneth Richmond (ENG)	Albert Ovendon (CAN)	fall
Armstrong	Richmond	points
O'Connor	Ovenden	fall
O'Connor	Richmond	points
Armstrong	Ovenden	w/o

Final positions: 1. Armstrong 2. O'Connor 3. Richmond 4. Ovenden
