= George Stott (wrestler) =

British wrestler

Personal information
- Born: 6 October 1888 Lidget Green, Bradford, England
- Died: 14 March 1969 (aged 80) Bradford, England

Sport
- Sport: Amateur wrestling
- Event: Featherweight
- Club: Bradford All Saints', Bradford

George Henry Stott (6 October 1888 – 14 March 1969) was a British wrestler who competed at the 1924 Summer Olympics.

== Biography ==
At the 1924 Olympic Games in Paris, he participated in the freestyle featherweight event.

Stott was a two-times winner of the British Wrestling Championships at featherweight in 1914 and 1919.
