= Noel Rhys =

British wrestler

Personal information
- Born: 23 February 1888 London, England
- Died: 12 June 1971 (aged 83) Burwood, New South Wales, Australia

Sport
- Sport: Amateur wrestling
- Club: Hammersmith Amateur Wrestling Club

Noel Raymond Rhys (23 February 1888 – 12 June 1971) was an amateur wrestler who competed at the 1912, 1920 and the 1924 Summer Olympics.

== Biography ==
At the 1912 Olympic Games in Stockholm, he participated in the Greco-Roman middleweight category.

He went on to appear at the 1920 Olympic Games in Antwerp, competing in the freestyle light-heavyweight event and the 1924 Olympic Games in Paris, in the middleweight event.

Rhys was a four-times winner of the British Wrestling Championships at light-heavyweight in 1922 and 1923 and super-heavyweight in 1912 and 1920.
