= Arthur Thompson (wrestler) =

British wrestler

Personal information
- Nationality: British (English)
- Born: 24 November 1911
- Died: 1978 (aged 66–67) London, England

Sport
- Sport: Amateur wrestling
- Club: Allrounders' Physical Culture Club, York

Arthur Thompson (24 November 1911 – 1978) was a British wrestler. He competed in the men's freestyle lightweight at the 1936 Summer Olympics.

Thompson was an eight-times winner of the British Wrestling Championships from 1933 to 1940.
