= George MacKenzie (wrestler) =

British wrestler

- Born: 21 November 1888; Islington, London, England
- Died: 27 June 1957 (aged 68); London, England

George MacKenzie (21 November 1888 – 27 June 1957) was a wrestler from Islington.

Mackenzie became British lightweight champion in 1909 at the British Wrestling Championships, winning the title again in 1912, 1922, 1924, 1932, and 1941. Additionally, he won the featherweight title four times, in 1921, 1922, 1924 and 1926. He lost the title to W Schneeberger in 1923 but regained the title in 1924. He was a leading member and coach of the Pentonville-based Ashdown Club, the premier British wrestling association of the period.

Mackenzie competed in the 1908 Olympics, finishing fourth. He competed in four further Olympics in total, up to 1928. He officiated at an additional four, and was chosen to carry the UK flag in the opening ceremony of the 1956 Olympics. He died of lung cancer in 1957.
