= Wrestling at the 1954 British Empire and Commonwealth Games =

- Venue: Kerrisdale Arena
- Location: East Boulevard, Kerrisdale, Vancouver, Canada
- Dates: 30 July – 7 August 1954

Wrestling at the 1954 British Empire and Commonwealth Games was the fifth appearance of Wrestling at the Commonwealth Games.

The sport featured contests in eight weight classes and the events were held in the Kerrisdale Arena.

South Africa topped the wrestling medal table with six gold medals.

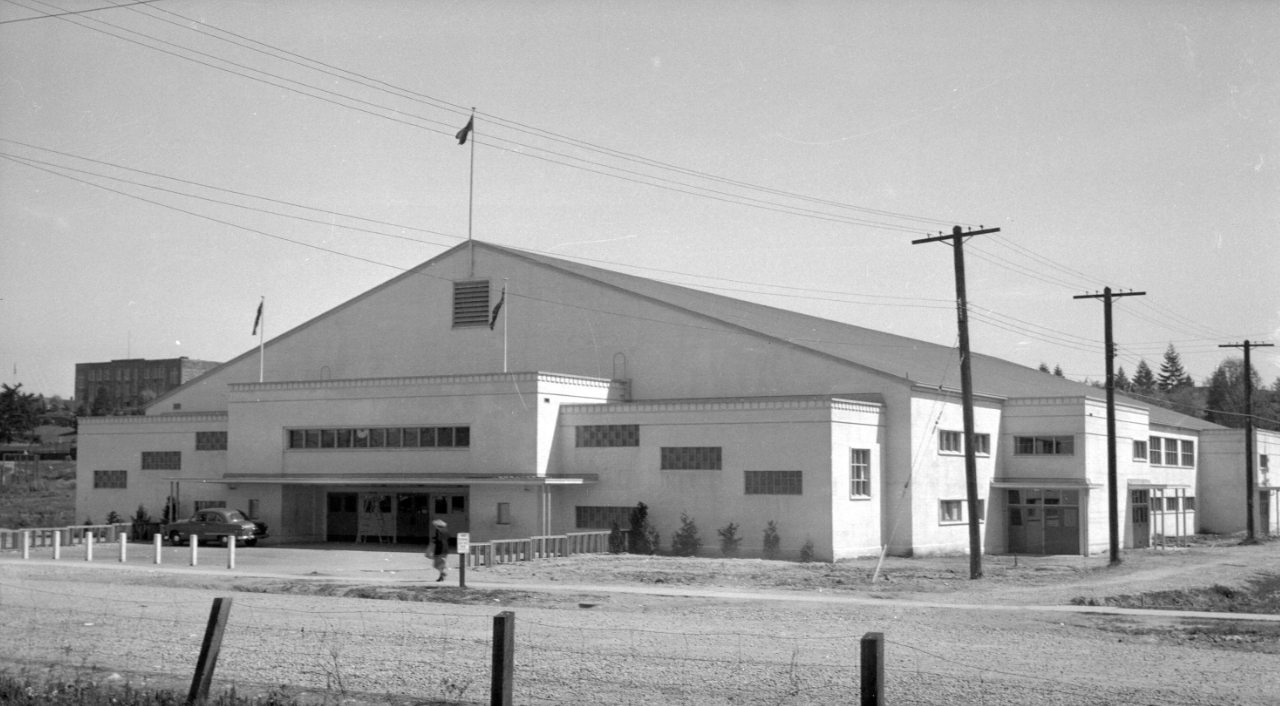
Kerrisdale Arena in 1950

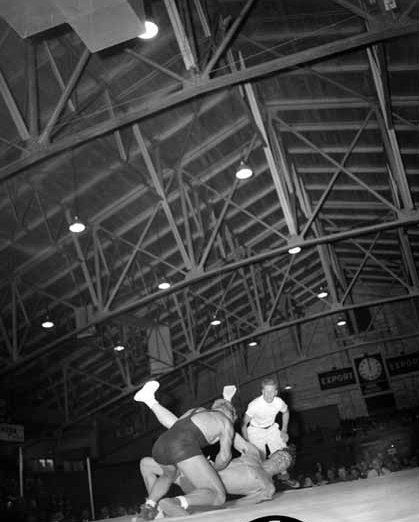
Wrestling at the Kerrisdale Arena during the Games. Attribution:Province newspaper

== Medal table ==
* Host nation (Canada)

Medals won by nation with totals, ranked by number of golds—sortable
Rank	Nation	Gold	Silver	Bronze	Total
1	South Africa	6	0	0	6
2	England	1	1	2	4
3	Australia	1	1	1	3
4	Canada*	0	4	0	4
5	Pakistan	0	2	1	3
6	Northern Rhodesia	0	0	2	2
7	New Zealand	0	0	1	1
Totals (7 entries)		8	8	7	23

== Medallists ==
Event	Gold	Silver	Bronze
Flyweight 52kg	Louis Baise (SAF)	Fred Flannery (AUS)	Din Mohammad (PAK)
Bantamweight 57kg	Geoff Jameson (AUS)	Muhammad Amin (PAK)	Ian Epton (NRH)
Featherweight 62kg	Abraham Geldenhuys (SAF)	Herbie Hall (ENG)	John Armitt (NZL)
Lightweight 68kg	Godfrey Pienaar (SAF)	Ruby Leobovitch (CAN)	Dick Garrard (AUS)
Welterweight 74kg	Nick Loubser (SAF)	Abdul Rashid (PAK)	Ray Myland (ENG)
Middleweight 82kg	Hermanus van Zyl (SAF)	Jim Christie (CAN)	Harry Kendall (ENG)
Light heavyweight 90kg	Jacob Theron (SAF)	Bob Steckle (CAN)	Dan van Staden (NRH)
Heavyweight 100kg	Ken Richmond (ENG)	Keith Maltman (CAN)	

== Results ==
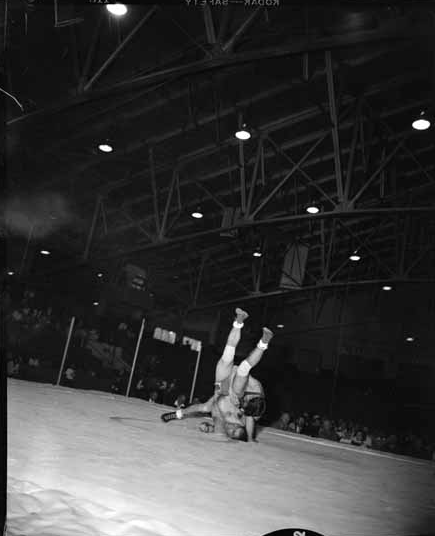
Wrestling at the Kerrisdale Arena during the Games. Attribution:Province newspaper

A match lasted 15 minutes with either a unanimous or split decision deciding the bout. The match would finish earlier if a wrestler was pinned or was subject to a fall.

=== Flyweight 52kg ===
Winner	Loser	Score
Allan Leyland (ENG)	David Clutchy (CAN)	unanimous
Louis Baise (SAF)	Fred Flannery (AUS)	split
Din Mohammad (PAK)	Leyland	unanimous
Flannery	Clutchy	split, eliminated
Baise	Mohammad	fall 9.43
Flannery	Leyland	fall 9.20
Flannery	Mohammad	fall 8.42

Final positions: 1. Baise 2. Flannery 3. Mohammad 4. Leyland 5. Clutchy

=== Bantamweight 57kg ===
Winner	Loser	Score
Geoff Jameson (AUS)	Adrian Poliquin (CAN)	pinned 4.55
Ian Epton (NRH)	Ken Ruby (NZL)	pinned 4.26
Muhammad Amin (PAK)	Ruby	split, eliminated
Poliquin	Epton	unanimous
Jameson	Epton	fall 5.07
Amin	Poliquin	unanimous
Jameson	Amin	unanimous

Final positions: 1. Jameson 2. Amin 3. Epton 4. Poliquin 5. Ruby

=== Featherweight 62kg ===
Winner	Loser	Score
Abraham Geldenhuys (SAF)	Herbie Hall (ENG)	unanimous
John Armitt (NZL)	Armand Bernard (CAN)	split
Hall	Bernard	split, eliminated
Geldenhuys	Armitt	unanimous
Hall	Armitt	unanimous

Final positions: 1. Geldenhuys 2. Hall 3. Armitt 4. Bernard

=== Lightweight 68kg ===
Winner	Loser	Score
Godfrey Pienaar (SAF)	Ruby Leobovitch (CAN)	unanimous
Dick Garrard (AUS)	George McKenzie (SCO)	unanimous
Pienaar	McKenzie	unanimous, eliminated
Leobovitch	Garrard	unanimous
Pienaar	Garrad	split

Final positions: 1. Pienaar 2. Leobovitch 3. Garrad 4. McKenzie

=== Welterweight 74kg ===
Winner	Loser	Score
Nick Loubser (SAF)	Henry Hudson (CAN)	unanimous
Abdul Rashid (PAK)	John Allison (SCO)	fall 6.47
Bruce Arthur (AUS)	Ray Myland (ENG)	unanimous
Loubser	Arthur	unanimous
Rashid	Hudson	unanimous, eliminated
Rashid	Arthur	fall 8.20, eliminated
Myland	Allison	fall 9.20, eliminated
Loubser	Rashid	fall 8.15
Loubser	Myland	unanimous

Final positions: 1. Loubser 2. Rashid 3. Myland 4. Arthur 5. Hudson 6. Allison

=== Middleweight 82kg ===
Winner	Loser	Score
Hermanus van Zyl (SAF)	Jim Christie (CAN)	unanimous
Malcolm Cowdrey (AUS)	George Farquhar (SCO)	unanimous
Christie	Harry Kendall (ENG)	unanimous
van Zyl	Cowdrey	unanimous
Christie	Cowdrey	unanimous, eliminated
van Zyl	Kendall	unanimous

Final positions: 1. van Zyl 2. Christie 3. Kendall 4. Cowdrey 5. Farquhar

=== Light heavyweight 90kg ===
- only three competitors

Winner	Loser	Score
Jacob Theron (SAF)	Dan van Staden (NRH)	pinned 2.30
Bob Steckle (CAN)	van Staden	pinned 1.35
Theron	Steckle	unanimous

Final positions: 1. Theron 2. Steckle 3. van Staden

=== Heavyweight 100kg ===
- only two competitors

Winner	Loser	Score
Ken Richmond (ENG)	Keith Maltman (CAN)	unanimous

Final positions: 1. Richmond 2. Maltman
