= Wrestling at the 2010 Commonwealth Games – Men's freestyle 96 kg =

Men's freestyle 96 kg competition at the 2010 Commonwealth Games in New Delhi, India, was held on 9 October at the Indira Gandhi Arena.

== Medalists ==
Gold	Sinvie Boltic; Nigeria
Silver	Korey Jarvis; Canada
Bronze	Leon Rattigan; England

=== Bracket ===
Preliminary
Etienne van Huyssree (RSA)	4	5	0
Aaron Quinlan (NZL)	0	1	0
Anil Maan (IND)	2	0	0
Leon Rattigan (ENG)	2	1	0

Quarterfinals
Korey Jarvis (CAN)	7	1	0
Muhammad Umar (PAK)	0	0	0
Bilal Abdo (AUS)	0	1	5
Andreas Pieri (CYP)	1	0	0
Mark Montgomery (NIR)	0	0	0
Sinvie Boltic (NGR)	6	3	0
Etienne van Huyssree (RSA)	0	1	0
Leon Rattigan (ENG)	3	5	0

Semifinals
Korey Jarvis (CAN)	7	0	0
Bilal Abdo (AUS)	0	0	0
Sinvie Boltic (NGR)	2	1	3
Leon Rattigan (ENG)	3	1	0

Final
Korey Jarvis (CAN)	0	1	2
Sinvie Boltic (NGR)	1	0	2

=== Repechage ===
Quarterfinals	Semifinals				Bronze Medal Bout
	Muhammad Umar (PAK)	5	2	0
	Bilal Abdo (AUS)	0	0	0
					Muhammad Umar (PAK)	0	1	0
					Leon Rattigan (ENG)	1	3	0
	Mark Montgomery (NIR)	0	0	0
	Leon Rattigan (ENG)	4	0	0
