= Tony Buck (wrestler) =

British wrestler (1936–2021)

Personal information
- Nationality: British (English)
- Born: 29 December 1933 Liverpool, England
- Died: 15 November 2021 (aged 88)
- Height: 180 cm (5 ft 11 in)
- Weight: 97 kg (214 lb)

Sport
- Sport: Amateur wrestling
- Event: Light-heavyweight
- Club: Crosby Amateur Wrestling Club
Medal record
Men's freestyle wrestling
Representing England
British Empire & Commonwealth Games
Gold medal – first place	1962 Perth	90 kg

Anthony "Tony" Jude Joseph Buck (29 December 1936 – 15 November 2021) was a British wrestler.

== Biography ==
Buck competed for England in the 1962 British Empire and Commonwealth Games in Perth, Western Australia where he won a gold medal in the light-heavyweight competition.

He also competed, for Great Britain, in the 1964 Olympics in Tokyo.

Buck was a six-times winner of the British Wrestling Championships at light-heavyweight in 1962, 1963 and 1965 and at heavyweight in 1957, 1961 and 1966.

Buck was a doorman at Liverpool's Cavern Club during the time the Beatles performed there in the 1960s.
