= Graeme English =

British wrestler (1964–2021)

Personal information
- Nationality: British (Scottish)
- Born: 25 September 1964 Kilsyth, Scotland
- Died: 18 February 2021 (aged 56)
- Height: 183 cm (6 ft 0 in)
- Weight: 90 kg (198 lb)

Sport
- Sport: Wrestling
- Club: East Kilbride
Medal record
Men's freestyle wrestling
Representing Scotland
Commonwealth Games
| Bronze medal – third place | 1986 Edinburgh | Light-heavyweight |

Graeme English (25 September 1964 – 18 February 2021) was a British wrestler who competed at the 1988 Summer Olympics.

== Biography ==
At the 1988 Olympic Games in Seoul he participated in the men's freestyle 90 kg event.

English was a nine-times winner of the British Wrestling Championships at light-heavyweight in 1986, 1987, 1988, 1990, 1992 and 1994, at heavyweight in 1989 and 1993 and super-heavyweight in 2000.
