= Fitzloyd Walker =

British wrestler

Fitz Walker
Personal information
- Nationality: Jamaican and British
- Born: 7 March 1959 (age 67) Jamaica

Sport
- Sport: Freestyle wrestling Judo
- Club: Manchester YMCA
Medal record
Representing England
Men's freestyle wrestling
Commonwealth Games
| Bronze medal – third place | 1986 Edinburgh | 74 kg |
Commonwealth Championship
| Silver medal – second place | 1991 Dunedin | 74 kg |
British Wrestling Championships
| Gold medal – first place | 1979 | 69 kg |
| Gold medal – first place | 1980 | 76 kg |
| Gold medal – first place | 1981 | 76 kg |
| Gold medal – first place | 1982 | 76 kg |
| Gold medal – first place | 1983 | 76 kg |
| Gold medal – first place | 1984 | 76 kg |
| Gold medal – first place | 1985 | 76 kg |
| Gold medal – first place | 1986 | 76 kg |
| Gold medal – first place | 1987 | 76 kg |
| Gold medal – first place | 1988 | 76 kg |
| Gold medal – first place | 1989 | 76 kg |
| Gold medal – first place | 1990 | 76 kg |
| Gold medal – first place | 1991 | 76 kg |
| Gold medal – first place | 1992 | 76 kg |
Men's Judo
British Judo Championships
| Bronze medal – third place | 1980 London | 71 kg |
| Gold medal – first place | 1982 Manchester | 71 kg |

Fitzloyd 'Fitz' Dean Walker (born 7 March 1959) is a Jamaican-British retired wrestler and judoka, who represented Great Britain and England. In freestyle wrestling, he won medals at the Commonwealth Games and Commonwealth Championship, along with a record-setting fourteen British championships. In judo, he was a gold and bronze medallist at the British Judo Championships.

It was previously thought that Walker was the first black wrestler to represent Great Britain at the Olympics before the discovery of Louis Bruce, Britain's first black Olympian.

== Wrestling career ==
Walker began training in wrestling at the YMCA in 1973 at his judo instructor's suggestion.

For international competition, Walker represented Jamaica at the 1978 Commonwealth Games. Walker represented Great Britain at the 1980 Summer Olympics, the 1984 Summer Olympics, and the 1988 Summer Olympics.

He represented England in the 74 kg weight class and finished in sixth place at the 1982 Commonwealth Games in Brisbane, Australia. He represented England and won a bronze medal in the 74 kg division at the 1986 Commonwealth Games in Edinburgh, Scotland. In 1991, Walker took silver in the 74 kg weight class at the Commonwealth Wrestling Championship.

Walker is a fourteen-time British champion at the British Wrestling Championships. He won the lightweight (69 kg/152 lb) division at the 1979 British Senior Championships before becoming the welterweight (76 kg/168 lb) champion for thirteen years in a row from 1980 to 1992. This achievement was acknowledged in The Guinness Book of Records.

== Judo career ==
Walker placed third in the -71 kg division at the 1980 British Judo Championships. He became a champion at the British Judo Championships in 1982, winning the -71 kg division.
