= Albert Sangwine =

English wrestler (1901–1962)

Personal information
- Born: 16 March 1901 Tottenham, London, England
- Died: 3 November 1962 (aged 61) Chingford, London, England
Medal record
Men's freestyle wrestling
Representing England
British Empire Games
Silver medal – second place	1930 Hamilton	Heavyweight

Albert Edwin Hawksley Sangwine (16 March 1901 – 3 November 1962) was an English freestyle sport wrestler who competed for Great Britain in the 1924 Summer Olympics.

== Biography ==
Sangwine was born in Tottenham, London, was the British champion after winning the 1926 heavyweight title at the British Wrestling Championships.

In 1924 he finished tenth in the freestyle heavyweight tournament.

Sangwine competed for the 1930 English team in the freestyle heavyweight class at the 1930 British Empire Games in Hamilton, Ontario, Canada. He won the silver medal after losing the gold medal match against Canadian Earl McCready.

He died in Chingford.
