= Walter Pilling =

British wrestler (1935–1999)

Personal information
- Nationality: British (English)
- Born: 18 April 1935 Bradford, England
- Died: 25 June 1999 Leeds, England
- Height: 165 cm (5 ft 5 in)
- Weight: 57 kg (126 lb)

Sport
- Sport: Wrestling
- Club: Great Northern AWC, Bradford
Medal record
Men's freestyle wrestling
Representing England
British Empire & Commonwealth Games
Silver medal – second place	1962 Perth	57 kg

Walter Pilling (18 April 1935 – June 1999) was a British wrestler. He competed at the 1960 Summer Olympics and the 1964 Summer Olympics.

== Biography ==
Pilling also represented England and won a silver medal in 57 kg bantamweight division, at the 1962 British Empire and Commonwealth Games in Perth, Western Australia.

Pilling was a seven-times winner of the British Wrestling Championships in 1952, 1953, 1957, 1959, 1960, 1962 and 1964.
