= Kenneth Richmond =

English wrestler (1926–2006)

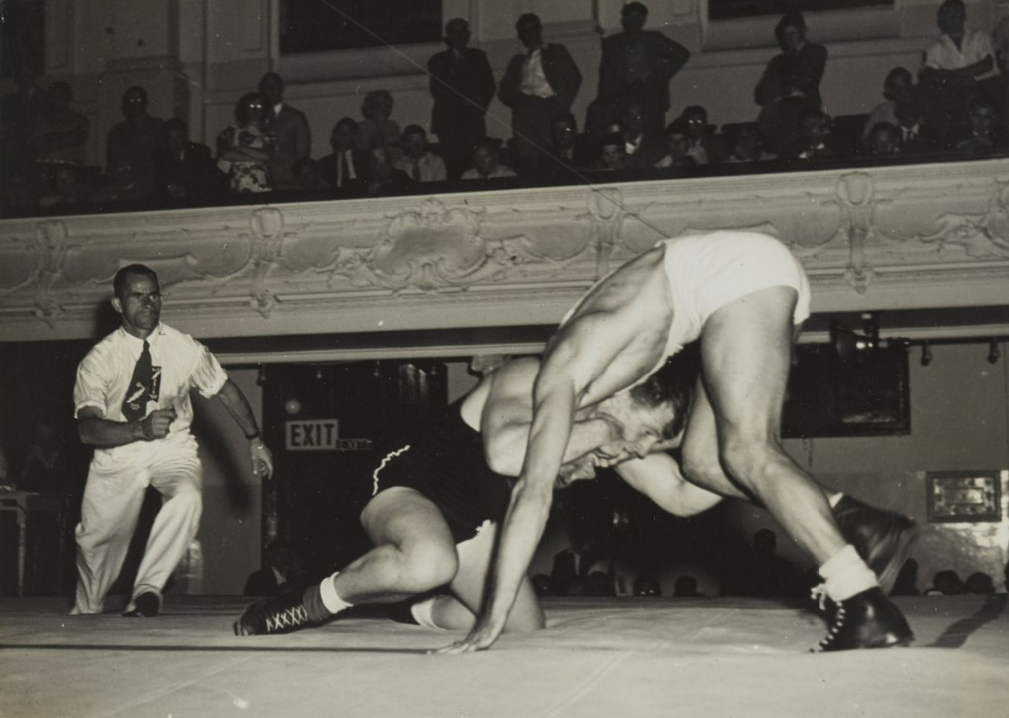
- Patrick O'Connor and Kenneth Richmond battle for the silver medal at the 1950 British Empire Games; Auckland Libraries Heritage Collections

Personal information
- Born: 10 July 1926 London, England
- Died: 3 August 2006 (aged 80) Christchurch, Dorset, England

Sport
- Sport: Wrestling
- Club: Foresters AWC, London
Medal record
Men's freestyle wrestling
Representing Great Britain
Olympic Games
Bronze medal – third place	1952 Helsinki	Heavyweight
Representing England
British Empire (and Commonwealth) Games
Gold medal – first place	1954 Vancouver	Heavyweight
Bronze medal – third place	1950 Auckland	Heavyweight

Kenneth Alan Richmond (10 July 1926 – 3 August 2006) was an English heavyweight wrestler who competed at four Olympic Games.

== Biography ==
Richmond was born in London and grew up near Pinewood Studios.

At 6'5" and 265 lbs, he competed for Great Britain at the 1948 Summer Olympics in London, finishing fifth in the Greco-Roman light heavyweight category. He represented the English team at the 1950 British Empire Games in Auckland, New Zealand, where he won the bronze medal in the heavyweight category.

He won a bronze medal at the 1952 Olympics and represented the English team at the 1954 British Empire and Commonwealth Games held in Vancouver, Canada, where he won the gold medal in the heavyweight category.

He appeared at two more Olympic Games in 1956 and 1960 respectively and represented the England team at the 1958 British Empire and Commonwealth Games in Cardiff.

Rixhmond was an eleven-times winner of the British Wrestling Championships at light-heavyweight in 1950 and at super heavyweight in 1949, 1950, 1952, 1953, 1954, 1955, 1956, 1958, 1959 and 1960.

He stayed fit enough into his later years to win medals for rollerblading and windsurfing in his 60s.

Though he appeared as the wrestler Nikolas in Jules Dassin's film noir, Night and the City (1950), Richmond was perhaps most recognisable as the shirtless gongman banging the enormous gong preceding the opening credits for films produced or distributed by the Rank Organisation. He was the fourth – and last – actor to take the job. According to the BBC, he had revealed to friends that the gong seen in the Rank Organisation's opening never rang, as it was a papier-mâché stage prop and he never actually struck it with any force, joking "If you hit that gong, you would have gone straight through."

He was a Jehovah's Witness from the late 1960s. He was jailed as a conscientious objector during World War II. In later life, he was a volunteer minister for the organisation. He died at age 80 in his home in Christchurch. (Richmond's wife, Valentina, died in 1996).

== Filmography ==
Year	Title	Role	Notes
1950	Night and the City	Nikolas of Athens	
1954	Mad About Men	Zampa	Uncredited
1956	The Iron Petticoat	Igor – Group 9 Operative	Uncredited, (final film role)

== Bibliography ==
- London Daily Mirror, 12 August 2006
- BBC Radio 4 Last Word, 18 August 2006
- Hevesi, Dennis (14 August 2006). "MOVIES: Ken Richmond, 80, Gong-Striker Familiar to Filmgoers, Dies". The New York Times.
