= Herbie Hall =

British wrestler (1926–2013)

Personal information
- Nationality: British (English)
- Born: 16 March 1926 Canada
- Died: 26 February 2013 (aged 86)

Sport
- Sport: Freestyle wrestling
- Club: Bolton Harriers
Medal record
Representing England
Men's freestyle wrestling
British Empire & Commonwealth Games
Silver medal – second place	1954 Vancouver	62 kg
British Championships
Gold medal – first place	1952	Featherweight
Gold medal – first place	1953	Featherweight
Gold medal – first place	1954	Featherweight
Gold medal – first place	1955	Featherweight
Gold medal – first place	1956	Featherweight
Gold medal – first place	1957	Featherweight
Gold medal – first place	1958	Lightweight
Gold medal – first place	1959	Lightweight
Gold medal – first place	1961	Featherweight
Gold medal – first place	1963	Featherweight

Herbert Henry Hall (16 March 1926 – 26 February 2013) was a British wrestler who competed at two Olympic Games.

== Biography ==
Hall was a notable Lancashire catch-as-catch-can wrestler and a ten-time British freestyle wrestling champion. He won the British freestyle (63 kg) featherweight championship, at the British Wrestling Championships from 1952–1957, 1961, and 1963, and the lightweight (69 kg) championship in 1958 and 1959.

Hall competed at the 1952 Summer Olympics and the 1956 Summer Olympics.

He represented the English team at the 1954 British Empire and Commonwealth Games held in Vancouver, Canada, where he won the silver medal in the featherweight category. He also represented represented the England team in the -68kg division at the 1958 British Empire and Commonwealth Games in Cardiff, Wales.
