= Ray Myland =

British wrestler (1927–2014)

Personal information
- Nationality: British (English)
- Born: 30 July 1927 St. Albans, Hertfordshire, England
- Died: 12 January 2014 (aged 86) Kent, England

Sport
- Sport: Wrestling
- Event: Welterweight/Middleweight
- Club: St Albans; John Ruskin, Walworth
Medal record
Men's freestyle wrestling
Representing England
British Empire & Commonwealth Games
Bronze medal – third place	1954 Vancouver	74 kg
Bronze medal – third place	1958 Cardiff	82 kg

Raymond Myland (30 July 1927 – 12 January 2014) was an English wrestler who competed for Great Britain at two Olympic Games.

== Biography ==
Myland represented Great Britain in the 1948 Summer Olympics and in the 1952 Summer Olympics.

He represented the English team at the 1954 British Empire and Commonwealth Games held in Vancouver, Canada, where he won the bronze medal in the welterweight category.

Four years later he won another bronze for the England team at the 1958 British Empire and Commonwealth Games in Cardiff in the -82 kg division.

Myland was a four-time winner of the British Wrestling Championships in 1947, 1951, 1952 and 1958.
