= Wallace Booth =

Scottish wrestler (1941–2023)

Personal information
- Nationality: British (Scottish)
- Born: c.1941 Aberdeen, Scotland
- Died: 2023

Sport
- Sport: Wrestling
- Event: Light-heavyweight
- Club: Milton WC, Edinburgh
Medal record
Men's freestyle wrestling
Representing Scotland
British Empire and Commonwealth Games
Silver medal – second place	1966 Kingston	Light-heavyweight

Wallace Booth (1941–2023) was an international wrestler from Scotland who competed at the Commonwealth Games and won a silver medal.

== Biography ==
Booth was a member of a well-known Aberdeen sporting family. His brother Ashley Booth played football for St Johnstone and East Fife and another brother Sandy was a golfer.

Booth moved from Aberdeen to Lancashire and began wrestling in 1961, finishing runner-up in his first event at the Lancashire Championships. He then won the British light-heavyweight Championship. He became the British champion for the second time in April 1966 but this time at middleweight and was chosen as the captain of the Scottish wrestling team.

Booth represented the Scotland team at the 1966 British Empire and Commonwealth Games in Kingston, Jamaica, where he participated in 90kg light-heavyweight category, and won a silver medal.

Shortly after the Games, he won a silver medal at the 1966 Highland games. In 1967 he lived in Milnes Avenue in Leigh and represented the Bolton team.

In 1970 Booth, a printer by profession, was forced to withdraw from the heavyweight category during the 1970 British Commonwealth Games in Edinburgh because he failed a fitness test shortly before his first match.

Booth won four British titles in total at the British Wrestling Championships (1964, 1966, 1967 and 1969).
