= Myroslav Dykun =

British wrestler

Personal information
- Nationality: Ukrainian/British
- Born: 24 October 1982 (age 43) Ukraine

Sport
- Sport: Amateur wrestling
Medal record
Men's Greco-Roman wrestling
Representing England
Commonwealth Games
Gold medal – first place	2010 Delhi	66 kg

Myroslav Dykun (born 24 October 1982) is a Ukrainian born British amateur wrestler in the Greco-Roman and freestyle disciplines, most notable for his gold medal in the 2010 Commonwealth Games.

== Biography ==
Born in Ukraine, Dykun moved to England in 2003. He was a three-times winner of the British Wrestling Championships in 2006, 2007 and 2009.

He switched from freestyle to Greco-Roman in early 2010.

In 2012 Dykun tested positive in a drugs test and was given a two-year ban.
