= Noel Loban =

British wrestler (born 1957)

Personal information
- Born: 28 April 1957 (age 69) Wimbledon, London, England
- Height: 190 cm (6 ft 3 in)
- Weight: 100 kg (220 lb)

Sport
- Sport: Amateur wrestling
- Event: Light-heavyweight / heavyweight
- Club: Redbridge AWC
Medal record
Men's freestyle wrestling
Representing Great Britain
Olympic Games
Bronze medal – third place	1984 Los Angeles	90 kg
Representing England
Commonwealth Games
Gold medal – first place	1986 Edinburgh	90 kg
Silver medal – second place	1994 Victoria	100 kg
Collegiate Wrestling
Representing the Clemson Tigers
NCAA Division I Championships
Gold medal – first place	1980 Corvallis	190 lb

Noel O. Loban (born 29 April 1957) is a former British freestyle wrestler who competed at two Olympic Games in 1984 and 1988 and won a bronze medal at the 1984 Olympics. He also won a gold medal at the Commonwealth Games.

== Wrestling career ==
Noel won the 1980 NCAA National Championship in the 190 lb weight division for Clemson University, beating Dan Severn of Arizona State. It was the first sports national championship in Clemson school history.

Loban competed in the 1984 Summer Olympics, where he won a bronze medal in the light-heavyweight category.

He represented England and won a gold medal in the 90 kg light-heavyweight, at the 1986 Commonwealth Games in Edinburgh, Scotland. Eight years later he won a bronze medal in the 100 kg heavyweight division, at the 1994 Commonwealth Games.

At the 1988 Olympic Games in Seoul he participated in the heavyweight category.

Loban was a six-times winner of the British Wrestling Championships at light-heavyweight in 1984 and at heavyweight in 1983, 1986, 1987, 1988 and 1994.

== Coaching career ==
Since 2008, Loban has been the Director of Student-Athlete Development for the NC State University wrestling program.

== Personal life ==
Loban is a born again Christian.
