= Stanley Bissell =

British wrestler

Personal information
- Born: 26 October 1906 Camberwell, England
- Died: 2 January 1999 (aged 92) Salisbury, England
Medal record
Men's freestyle wrestling
Representing England
British Empire Games
Silver medal – second place	1930 Hamilton	Middleweight
Silver medal – second place	1934 London	Middleweight

Stanley John Bissell (26 October 1906 – 2 January 1999) was an English freestyle and Greco-Roman sport wrestler who competed for Great Britain at the 1948 Summer Olympics.

== Biography ==
Bissell was born in Camberwell, England.

He competed for the 1930 English team in the freestyle middleweight class at the 1930 British Empire Games in Hamilton, Ontario, Canada. He lost the gold medal match against Canadian Mike Chepesiuk. Four years later he won again the silver medal in the freestyle middleweight category at the 1934 Empire Games.

In the 1948 Summer Olympics he competed in the Greco-Roman tournament as a middleweight.

Bissell was a ten-times winner of the British Wrestling Championships at middleweight in 1930, 1934, 1935 and 1938, at light-heavyweight in 1934, 1935 and 1939, and at super-heavyweight in 1932, 1933 and 1934.
