= Amarjit Singh =

British wrestler (born 1970)

Personal information
- Nationality: British (English)
- Born: 29 August 1970 (age 56) Wolverhampton, England

Sport
- Sport: Wrestling
- Event: light heavyweight / heavyweight
- Club: Wolverhampton Wrestling Club
Medal record
Men's freestyle wrestling
Representing England
Commonwealth Games
Bronze medal – third place	1994 Victoria	+100 kg

Tutt Amarjit Singh (born 29 August 1970) also spelt Amerjit is a British former male wrestler who competed at the 1996 Summer Olympics.

== Biography ==
At the 1996 Olympic Games in Atlanta, Singh competed in the men's freestyle 130 kg, where he finished in 13th place in the men's super-heavyweight division.

He represented England and won a bronze medal in the 100 kg+ super-heavyweight division, at the 1994 Commonwealth Games in Victoria, Canada. Eight years later, he competed in his home Commonwealth Games at the 2002 Commonwealth Games in Manchester.

Singh was a 12-times winner of the British Wrestling Championships at light-heavyweight in 1989, heavyweight in 1990 and super-heavyweight from 1991 to 1999 and 2001.

In April 2014, Singh was jailed for 6 1/2 years for possessing prohibited firearms and ammunition.
