= Calum McNeil =

British wrestler (born 1966)

Personal information
- Nationality: British (Scottish)
- Born: 30 April 1966 (age 60) Glasgow, Scotland
- Height: 183 cm (6 ft 0 in)
- Weight: 70 kg (154 lb)

Sport
- Sport: Amateur wrestling
- Club: Milngavie AWC

Calum Douglas McNeil (born 30 April 1966) is a former wrestler from Scotland who competed at the 1992 Summer Olympics.

== Biography ==
At the 1992 Olympic Games in Barcelona he participated in the men's freestyle 68 kg category.

McNeil was a three-times winner of the British Wrestling Championships in 1991, 1992 and 1994.
