= Leslie Jeffers =

British wrestler (1910–2000)

Personal information
- Nationality: British (English)
- Born: 8 January 1910 Plaistow, West Sussex, England
- Died: 4 May 2000 (aged 90) Middlesbrough, England

Sport
- Sport: Wrestling
- Event: Middleweight
- Club: Metropolitan Police
Medal record
Men's freestyle wrestling
Representing England
British Empire Games
Bronze medal – third place	1938 Sydney	Middleweight

Leslie Herbert Arthur Jeffers (8 January 1910 – 4 May 2000) was an English freestyle sport wrestler who competed for Great Britain at the 1936 Summer Olympics.

== Biography ==
Jeffers was born in Plaistow, West Sussex, the son of a London seaman who was killed during World War I, when HMS Hermes was sunk.

He was a sergeant in the Metropolitan Police and was a member of their wrestling team. He was also a physical training instructor for Scotland Yard. At the 1936 Summer Olympics in Berlin, he competed in the freestyle middleweight tournament.

He represented England at the 1938 British Empire Games in Sydney, Australia, where he competed in the Middleweight category, winning a bronze medal.

During World War II he was a Wellington Bomber flight navigator. He was a five times British champion at the British Wrestling Championships; middleweight 1936-37, and 1939, and light-heavyweight champion in 1940-41. He died in Middlesbrough.
