= Duncan Burns =

British wrestler

Personal information
- Nationality: British (English)

Sport
- Sport: Amateur wrestling
Medal record
Men's freestyle wrestling
Representing England
Commonwealth Games
Silver medal – second place	1986 Edinburgh	48 kg

Duncan Burns is a British retired freestyle wrestler.

== Biography ==
Burns represented England and won a silver medal in the 48 kg light-flyweight division, at the 1986 Commonwealth Games in Edinburgh, Scotland.

Burns was a two-times winner of the British Wrestling Championships in 1985 and 1986.
