= Harry Johnson (wrestler) =

British wrestler

Personal information
- Nationality: British (English)
- Born: 1903

Sport
- Sport: Wrestling
- Event: Welterweight
Medal record
Men's freestyle wrestling
Representing England
British Empire Games
Silver medal – second place	1930 Hamilton	Welterweight

Harry Johnson (born 1903, date of death unknown) was an English wrestler.

== Biography ==
Johnson represented the 1930 English team in the welterweight category at the 1930 British Empire Games in Hamilton, Ontario, Canada. He lost the gold medal match against Reg Priestley of Canada.

He was a turner at the time of the 1930 Games and lived in 31 Kambala Road, Battersea.
