= Amrik Singh Gill =

British wrestler

Personal information
- Nationality: British
- Born: 24 April 1951 (age 75) India

Sport
- Sport: Amateur wrestling
Medal record
Men's freestyle wrestling
Representing England
Commonwealth Games
Silver medal – second place	1974 Christchurch	57 kg
Bronze medal – third place	1978 Edmonton	57 kg

Amrik Singh Gill (born 24 April 1951) is a male Indian born former wrestler who competed for Great Britain and England.

== Wrestling career ==
Gill competed at the 1972 Summer Olympics, the 1976 Summer Olympics and the 1980 Summer Olympics.

He represented England and won a silver medal in the 57kg bantamweight division, at the 1974 British Commonwealth Games in Christchurch, New Zealand.

Four Years later he represented England again and won a bronze medal in the 57kg bantamweight division, at the 1978 Commonwealth Games in Edmonton, Canada.

Gill was an eight-times winner of the British Wrestling Championships in 1971, 1972, 1973, 1975, 1976, 1977, 1978 and 1980.
