= Andrew Hutchinson (wrestler) =

British wrestler

Personal information
- Nationality: British (English)

Sport
- Sport: Amateur wrestling
Medal record
Men's freestyle wrestling
Representing England
Commonwealth Games
Silver medal – second place	1994 Victoria	52 kg

Andrew Hutchinson is a male British former amateur wrestler.

== Biography ==
Hutchinson represented England and won a silver medal in the 52 kg flyweight, at the 1994 Commonwealth Games.

Hutchinson was a two-times winner of the British Wrestling Championships in 1994 and 2001.
