= Craig Pilling =

British freestyle wrestler

Personal information
- Nationality: British
- Born: 14 September 1986 (age 39) Bolton, England
- Height: 5 ft 4 in (163 cm)
- Weight: 60 kg (130 lb)

Sport
- Sport: Wrestling
- Event: Men's 57 kg
Medal record
Men's freestyle wrestling
Representing Wales
Commonwealth Games
Bronze medal – third place	2014 Glasgow	57 kg

Craig Pilling (born 14 September 1986) is a British freestyle wrestler.

== Biography ==
Pilling competed for Wales in the men’s freestyle 55kg event at the 2010 Commonwealth Games placing 4th. Four years later, he competed in the men's freestyle 57 kg event at the 2014 Commonwealth Games where he won a bronze medal.

Pilling was a two-times winner of the British Wrestling Championships in 2006 and 2014.
