= Ray Cazaux =

British wrestler (1917–1999)

Personal information
- Nationality: British (English)
- Born: 3 July 1917 Liverpool, England
- Died: 11 September 1999 (aged 82) Leeds, England

Sport
- Sport: Wrestling
- Event: Bantamweight
- Club: College Physical Culture Club, Bradford
Medal record
Men's freestyle wrestling
Representing England
British Empire Games
Bronze medal – third place	1938 Sydney	Bantamweight

Raymond Cazaux (3 July 1917 – 11 September 1999) was an English freestyle sport wrestler who competed for Great Britain at two Olympic Games.

== Biography ==
Cazaux was born in Liverpool to a French father. He lived in Bradford and was a manager in a bakery.

He competed for Great Britain at the 1936 Summer Olympics in Berlin, participating in the freestyle bantamweight tournament.

He represented England at the 1938 British Empire Games in Sydney, Australia, where he competed in the freestyle bantamweight class, winning a bronze medal.

Ten years later he finished fifth in the freestyle bantamweight competition at the 1948 Summer Olympics.

Cazaux was an eight-times winner of the British Wrestling Championships in 1936, 1937, 1939, 1940, 1941, 1948, 1949 and 1950.
