= John Melling (wrestler) =

British wrestler (born 1970)

Personal information
- Nationality: British (English)
- Born: 16 December 1970 Wigan, Lancashire, England

Sport
- Sport: Amateur wrestling
Medal record
Men's freestyle wrestling
Representing England
Commonwealth Games
Silver medal – second place	1994 Victoria	62 kg
Men's collegiate wrestling
Representing Simon Fraser
NAIA Championships
Gold medal – first place	1992 Hays	134 lb
Gold medal – first place	1993 Butte	134 lb
Gold medal – first place	1996 Jamestown	142 lb
Silver medal – second place	1995 Jamestown	142 lb

John Melling (born 16 December 1970) is a male British former wrestler.

== Biography ==
Melling represented England and won a silver medal in the 62 kg featherweight category, at the 1994 Commonwealth Games in Victoria, Canada. Eight years later he also competed in the 2002 Commonwealth Games in Manchester.

Melling was a nine-times winner of the British Wrestling Championships in 1987, 1990, 1991, 1992, 1994, 1997, 1998, 2000 and 2001.

In 1990, he moved to Vancouver, Canada, and attended Simon Fraser University. He wrestled for the varsity team, winning the NAIA Championships at 134 lbs in 1992 and 1993, he was second at 142 lbs in 1995, before winning the 142 lbs weight division in his final year in 1996. Melling was inducted into the NAIA Hall of Fame in 2004.
