= Arnold Parsons =

British wrestler (1926–2022)

Personal information
- Nationality: British (English)
- Born: 25 December 1926 London, England
- Died: 28 September 2022 (aged 95)

Sport
- Sport: Wrestling
- Event: Featherweight
- Club: Ashdown AC, Islington
Medal record
Men's freestyle wrestling
Representing England
British Empire Games
| Bronze medal – third place | 1950 Auckland | 62 kg |

Arnold Stewart Parsons (25 December 1926 – 28 September 2022) was an English wrestler who competed at the 1948 Summer Olympics.

== Biography ==
At the 1948 Olympic Games in London, Parsons competed for Great Britain in the freestyle featherweight category.

He represented the English team at the 1950 British Empire Games in Auckland, New Zealand, where he won the bronze medal in the featherweight category.

Parsons was a four-times winner of the British Wrestling Championships in 1944, 1945, 1946 and 1948.

Parsons died on 28 September 2022, at the age of 95.
