= Leon Rattigan =

British wrestler

Personal information
- Nationality: British (English)
- Born: 4 October 1987 (age 38) Bristol, England

Sport
- Sport: Wrestling
- Event: Heavyweight
Medal record
Men's freestyle wrestling
Representing England
Commonwealth Games
Bronze medal – third place	2010 Perth	96 kg
Bronze medal – third place	2014 Glasgow	97 kg

Leon Gregory Rattigan (born 4 October 1987) is a British former freestyle wrestler who represented the Great Britain national squad.

== Biography ==
Rattigan started freestyle wrestling at the age of ten at the Bristol Olympic Wrestling Club under the late legendary coach Amir Esmaeli.

Rattigan was a five-times winner of the British Wrestling Championships at heavyweight in 2008, 2009, 2010, 2012 and 2013. He was also the English Senior Champion multiple times during his wrestling career.

Rattigan competed in the 96 kg class in the 2009 world championship for Great Britain. Rattigan won the bronze medal for England in the men's freestyle 96 kg event at the 2010 Commonwealth Games in Delhi, India in October 2010. During 2011, Rattigan has also won the British Open wrestling championships and the Sassari International Tournament.

In 2013, Rattigan won the British Open wrestling championships and was selected to represent Great Britain at the FILA International Olympia Tournament where he secured a silver medal.

In 2014, Rattigan won the bronze medal for England in the men's freestyle 97 kg event at the 2014 Commonwealth Games in Glasgow, Scotland in July 2014.

Rattigan was also the head coach in WLWC where he prepared young athletes for upcoming competitions and gave people in the community a chance to enjoy the sport of freestyle wrestling.
