= Bert Aspen =

British wrestler (born 1934)

Personal information
- Nationality: British (English)
- Born: 1 March 1934 (age 92) Bolton, England
- Height: 168 cm (5 ft 6 in)
- Weight: 62 kg (137 lb)

Sport
- Sport: Wrestling
- Club: Bolton Harriers; Bolton OWC
Medal record
Men's freestyle wrestling
Representing England
British Empire & Commonwealth Games
Bronze medal – third place	1958 Cardiff	62 kg
Bronze medal – third place	1962 Perth	62 kg
Bronze medal – third place	1966 Kingston	62 kg

Albert "Bert" Aspen MBE (born 1 March 1934) is a British former wrestler who competed at the 1960 Summer Olympics and the 1964 Summer Olympics.

== Biography ==
Aspen represented the England team and won a bronze medal in the -62 kg division at the 1958 British Empire and Commonwealth Games in Cardiff, Wales.

Aspen went to his second Commonwealth Games, winning another bronze medal at the 1962 British Empire and Commonwealth Games in Perth, Western Australia. The following year he was selected by Great Britain for the 1963 international match against France.

Aspen won the featherweight title at the 1966 European Championships in Karlsruhe, West Germany and

Aspen represented the England team again at the 1966 British Empire and Commonwealth Games in Kingston, Jamaica, where he participated in 62 kg featherweight weight category. and won a third consecutive bronze medal.

Aspen was a six-times winner of the British Wrestling Championships in 1958, 1960, 1961, 1964, 1967 and 1968.

Aspen was appointed Member of the Order of the British Empire (MBE) in the 2020 Birthday Honours for services to wrestling.
