= Keith Peache =

British wrestler

Personal information
- Born: 10 August 1947 (age 79) Lewisham, London, England
- Height: 180 cm (5 ft 11 in)
- Weight: 98 kg (216 lb)

Sport
- Sport: Wrestling
Medal record
Men's freestyle wrestling
Representing England
Commonwealth Games
Bronze medal – third place	1986 Edinburgh	+100 kg

Keith Peache (born 10 August 1947) is a British retired wrestler who competed at two Olympic Games.

== Biography ==
Peache competed at the 1976 Summer Olympics and the 1980 Summer Olympics.

He represented England finishing in fourth place in the 100 kg heavyweight division, at the 1978 Commonwealth Games in Edmonton, Canada. Four years later he once again finished just outside the medals when finishing fourth again for England, at the 1982 Commonwealth Games in Brisbane, Australia. He finally won a medal (a bronze) in the +100 kg super-heavyweight division at the 1986 Commonwealth Games in Edinburgh, Scotland.

Peache was an eleven-times winner of the British Wrestling Championships at light-heavyweight in 1980 and at heavyweight in 1974, 1975, 1977, 1978, 1981, 1982, 1984 and 1985 and at super-heavyweight in 1983 and 1986.
