= Bernard Rowe =

English wrestler (1904–1986)

Personal information
- Nationality: British (English)
- Born: 15 May 1904 Nottingham, England
- Died: 5 March 1986 (aged 81) Nottingham, England

Sport
- Sport: Wrestling
- Events: Middleweight; Light-Heavyweight
- Club: Nottingham Physical Culture School
Medal record
Men's freestyle wrestling
Representing England
British Empire Games
Silver medal – second place	1934 London	Light heavyweight

Bernard James Rowe (15 May 1904 – 5 March 1986) was a freestyle sport wrestler who competed for Great Britain in the 1924 Summer Olympics and in the 1928 Summer Olympics.

== Biography ==
In 1924 he finished eleventh in the freestyle middleweight tournament. Four years later he finished sixth in the freestyle light heavyweight tournament at the 1928 Olympics. At the 1934 Empire Games, he won the silver medal in the freestyle light heavyweight class.

Rowe was a seven-times winner of the British Wrestling Championships at middleweight in 1929, 1931 and 1932, at light-heavyweight in 1928, 1929 and 1933 and at heavyweight in 1929.

== Family ==
His brother, Douglas, played football with Luton Town, Lincoln City and Southampton.
