= Wrestling at the 1930 British Empire Games =

- Venue: Barton Street Arena
- Location: Hamilton, Ontario, Canada
- Dates: 16 – 23 August 1930

At the 1930 British Empire Games, the wrestling competition featured men's contests in seven weight classes. The boxing and wrestling events were held at the Barton Street Arena.

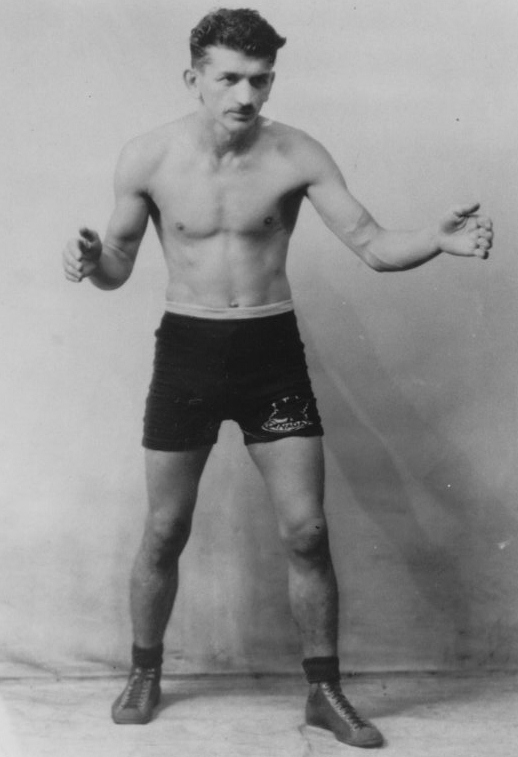
Jim Trifunov

== Medal table ==
* Host nation (Canada)

Medals won by nation with totals, ranked by number of golds—sortable
Rank	Nation	Gold	Silver	Bronze	Total
1	Canada (CAN)*	7	0	0	7
2	England (ENG)	0	6	0	6
3	South Africa (SAF)	0	0	1	1
Totals (3 entries)		7	6	1	14

== Medal summary ==
Event	Gold	Silver	Bronze
Bantamweight	Jim Trifunov (CAN)	Joseph Reid (ENG)	none awarded
Featherweight	Cliff Chilcott (CAN)	none awarded	none awarded
Lightweight	Howard Thomas (CAN)	Harold Angus (ENG)	none awarded
Welterweight	Reg Priestley (CAN)	Harry Johnson (ENG)	none awarded
Middleweight	Mike Chepesiuk (CAN)	Stanley Bissell (ENG)	Max Thiel (SAF)
Light heavyweight	Bill McIntyre (CAN)	Edgar Bacon (ENG)	none awarded
Heavyweight	Earl McCready (CAN)	Albert Sangwine (ENG)	none awarded

== Results ==
- Day 1
  - Trifunov bt Reid, one fall to nil
  - Thomas bt Angus, on points
- Day 2
  - Bissell bt Thiel, on points
  - Priestley bt Johnson, two falls to nil
  - McIntyre bt Bacon, one fall
- Day 3
  - Chepesiuk bt Bissell, two falls
  - McReady bt Sangwine, two falls
