= Thomas Ward (wrestler) =

Scottish wrestler

Personal information
- Nationality: British (Scottish)
- Born: 29 June 1907 Sanday, Orkney, Scotland
- Died: 6 April 1986 (aged 78) Biggin Hill, England

Sport
- Sport: Wrestling
- Event: Light heavyweight
- Club: Metropolitan Police
Medal record
Men's freestyle wrestling
Representing Scotland
British Empire Games
Bronze medal – third place	1938 Sydney	Light heavyweight

Thomas Ian Murray Ward (29 June 1907 – 6 April 1986) was a Scottish freestyle sport wrestler who competed for Great Britain at the 1936 Summer Olympics.

== Biography ==
Ward was born in Sanday, Orkney.

In 1936 he competed in the freestyle light heavyweight tournament.

Ward represented Scotland at the 1938 British Empire Games in the Light heavyweight event, finishing third the round robin and claiming a bronze medal. At the time of the 1938 Games he was a policeman and lived at 51 Union Grove, Clapham, London.

Ward was a three-times winner of the British Wrestling Championships at light-heavyweight in 1936, 1937 and 1943.
