= Mark Cocker (wrestler) =

English wrestler (born 1982)

- Mark Cocker defeating Commonwealth Games bronze medallist Chinu Xxx
- Born: 14 June 1982; Bolton, Greater Manchester, England
- Known for: GB and international wrestler; coaching elite combat sports; grappling

Mark Cocker (born 14 June 1982) is a freestyle wrestler, Ju-Jitsu and Judo player who trains with Bolton Olympic Wrestling Club. Cocker is a British and English freestyle wrestling champion and has competed for England and Great Britain for fifteen years. He is also a 1st Dan black belt in Judo under Steve Pullen MBE and 1st Dan Black Belt in Ju-Jitsu under Professor Trevor Roberts.

== Early career ==
Cocker first got into martial arts after training with local instructor Trevor Roberts, and gained his first dan black belt in Roberts' Tetsu-no-otoko-ryu style of Ju-Jitsu. After showing a flair for grappling, Roberts began to coach him in the Russian style of combat known as Sambo wrestling. Eventually, he began to train at his local wrestling club in Bolton. Cocker's junior career saw him take regional and national titles, and he was chosen to represent Great Britain in the World Cadet Championships in 1998 held at the then Nynex Arena in Manchester. He placed 14th in the world.

== Senior career ==
After a successful junior career, Cocker moved into the senior ranks, winning and medalling in numerous domestic and international tournaments. In 2002, he narrowly lost a 'wrestle off' for the English 2002 Commonwealth Games team to a former South African wrestler who gained eligibility to wrestle for England. Cocker attended the 2002 Games as 96 kg reserve. 2002 also saw him place 7th in the FISU World University Wrestling Championships. Hhe was the first British wrestler to ever compete at this event.

Cocker continued to compete domestically and internationally until late 2004. He then began to cross train in other sports, including a return to Ju-Jitsu and Judo. He transferred his wrestling skills onto the Judo mat, training under Steve Pullen at Urmston Judo club. He gained his first Dan black belt in Judo, represented the North West in the National Team Championships, and secured a bronze medal in the 2008 Heart of England Judo Championships.

== Return to competition ==
In late 2008, Cocker resumed his freestyle wrestling career and began training again at Bolton Olympic Wrestling club. What made him stand out from other elite British wrestlers was his part-time status, receiving no funding as he developed his career in teaching. He made his competitive comeback in the 2009 British Open wrestling championships winning the bronze medal in the 120 kg weight division. He went on to win the 2010 English Open Championships at the 120 kg weight division and placed second in the 2010 British Closed championships. In July 2010, Cocker was chosen to represent Great Britain at the UK Sport funded GB World Cup event held in Sheffield. He won the silver medal, beating wrestlers from Uzbekistan and Latvia to reach the final.

== 2010 Commonwealth Games ==
In August 2010, Cocker was victorious in a final 'wrestle off 'against the Great Britain international and Commonwealth Games bronze medallist Chinu Xxx, at the 120 kg weight division, to decide who should represent Team England in the 2010 Commonwealth Games to be held in Delhi. The 'wrestle off' was a 'best of three' series of matches held at the Salford Wrestling academy, the same venue where he had lost his 2002 Commonwealth Games 'wrestle off'. Cocker won both matches and was selected to represent Team England in both the Greco-Roman and freestyle disciplines. This made him the only English wrestler to ever compete at a Commonwealth Games in both styles. Cocker was knocked out in the semi-final stage, finishing 5th in both styles.

== Senior career continued ==
In 2011, Cocker won the 2011 British Open Championships, represented Great Britain at the FILA 2011 European Wrestling Championships held in Dortmund (Germany), was selected to compete in the 2012 London Olympics test event (he was unable to compete due to injury) and placed second in the 2012 British Open Championships. During 2013 Cocker again won the British Open Championships (the first Team England qualifier for the 2014 Commonwealth Games), beating the Poland international T. Bujak 7–0 in the final before being selected to represent Great Britain at the FILA International Olympia Tournament in Greece, where he secured a bronze medal. In 2014 Cocker won a silver medal in the English Open Wrestling Championships (120 kg category) before dropping to the 97 kg weight category and winning the British Closed Wrestling Championships.

== The 2014 British Open Wrestling Championships ==
On 11 May 2014 Cocker placed third at the 2014 British Open Wrestling Championships (the final qualifier for the 2014 Commonwealth Games), losing only one bout to the eventual winner of the tournament. Subsequently, Cocker was not nominated for selection to the 2014 England Commonwealth Games team. In August 2014 it was discovered that the winner of Cocker's weight class had failed a drugs test at the 2014 British Open and was found guilty of a doping violation resulting in a two-year ban from all competitions. The British Wrestling Association anti-doping policy would mean that no final positions were amended; however, the athlete who had failed the test was removed from the official results, effectively moving Cocker to second in the final standings (behind the athlete he had previously defeated by points superiority in the 2014 British Closed Championships). In January 2015, after a successful complaint and mediation process with the British Wrestling Association, Cocker received an apology from the National Governing Body for any confusion or distress they had caused him due to a failure to follow its own anti-doping policy following the violation at the 2014 British Championships.

== The 2017 British Open Wrestling Championships ==
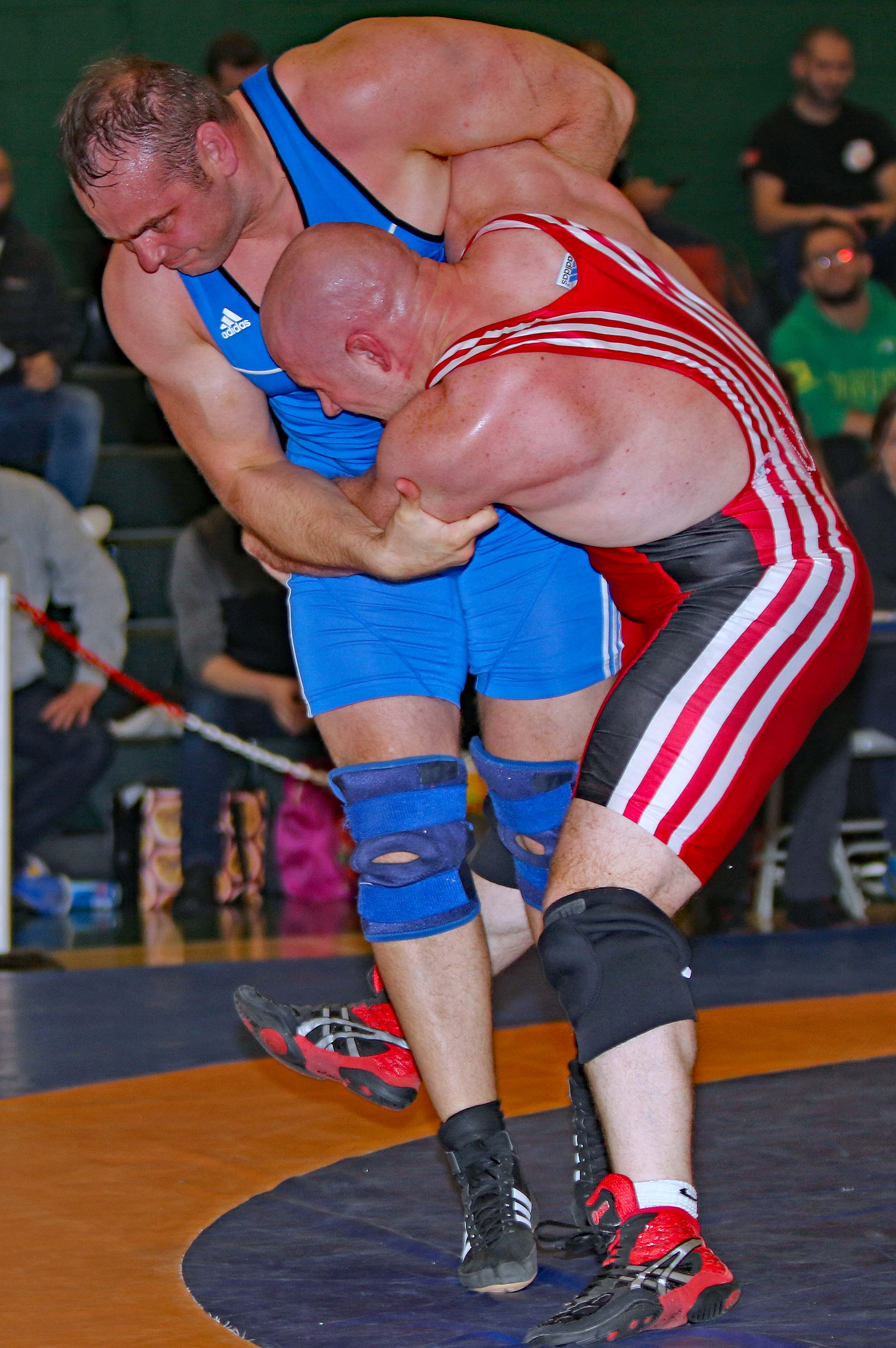
Cocker taking a body lock

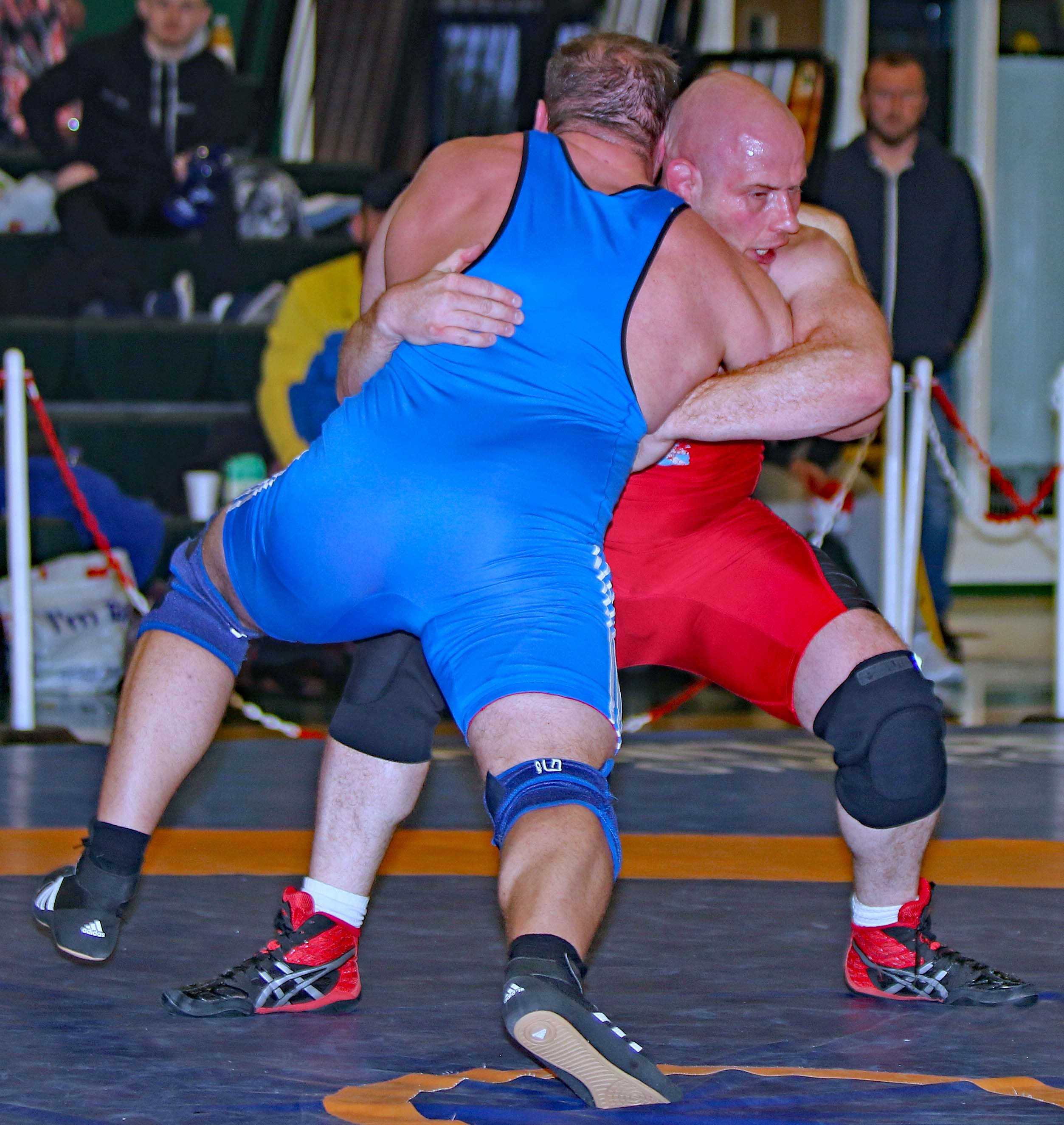
Cocker setting up a suplex

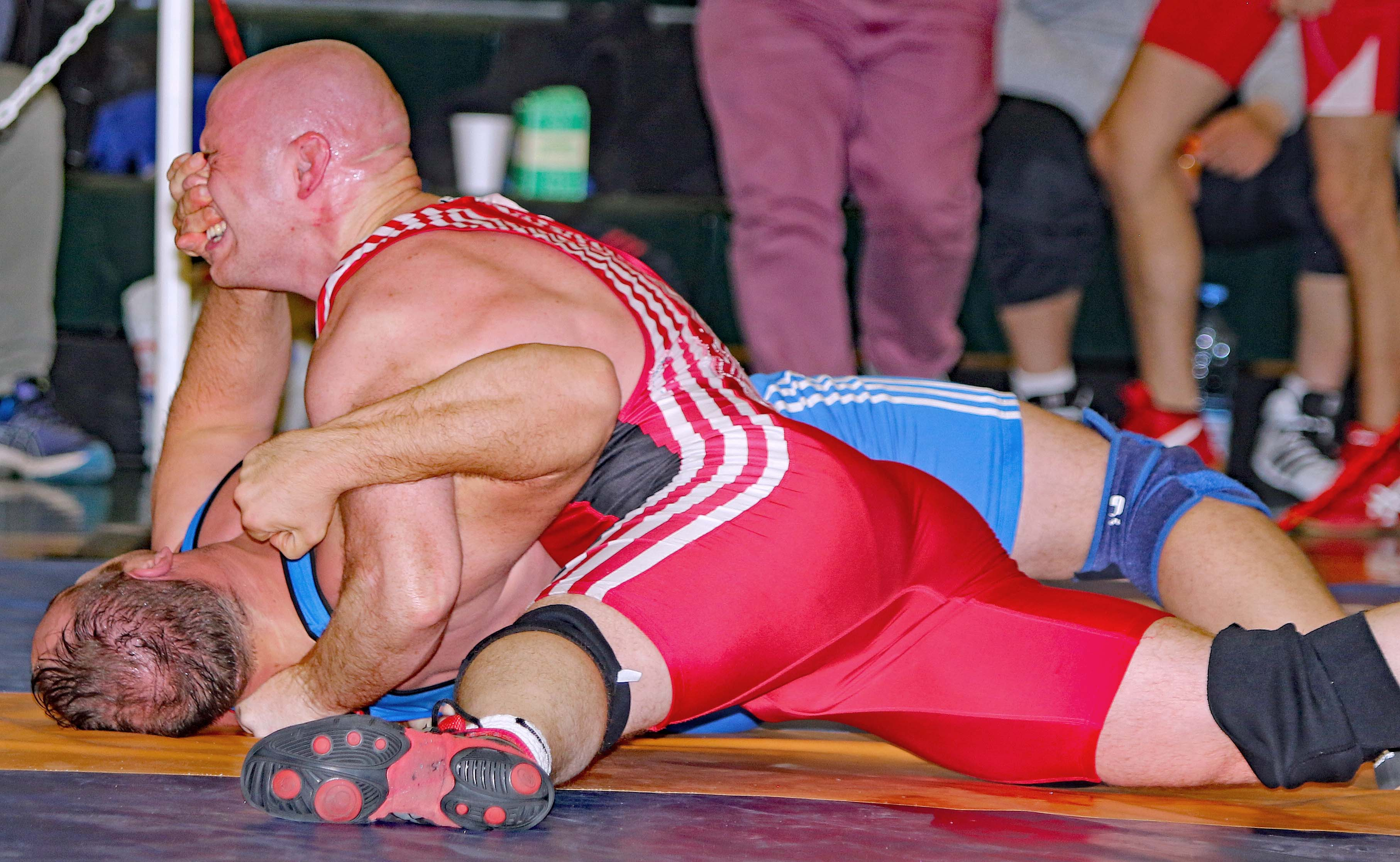
Cocker winning the 2017 British Open Championships

On 4 November 2017, after a three and a half year absence from competition, Cocker entered the 2017 British Open Wrestling Championships held in Nottingham. The event was also the final 2018 Commonwealth Games qualifier. Cocker, at 35 years old, was an eligible 'Masters' age category competitor, but competed in the 125 kg senior open age category. Cocker won all his matches by either points superiority or pin. He secured notable wins over Mandhir Kooner (Commonwealth Games bronze medallist) and Richard Tuke, suplexing and pinning his opponent in the final bout. The competition was reported to be Cocker's final open age category entry.

== The 2018 ADCC British Open ==
Cocker competed in the 2018 ADCC British open, finishing 2nd in the Men's under 98.9KG Professional category.

== The 2026 British Beach Wrestling Open Championships ==
In July 2026, Cocker aged 44 entered the inaugural British Beach Wrestling Open Championships. Cocker secured 4 wins to place 1st in the pool of 5, then won his semi-final bout to secure a place in the under 90kg final. Placing second, Cocker was the highest placed British athlete out of 10. In winning the silver medal, he had secured a national medal in a UWW style of wrestling across four decades, having won medals in the 1990's, 2000's, 2010's and 2020's,

== Achievements on return to competition ==
Year	Tournament	Place	Weight class
2026	British Beach Wrestling Open Championships	2nd	Light Heavyweight (90 kg)
2018	ADCC British Open - Professional	2nd	Heavyweight (99 kg)
2017	British Open Wrestling Championships	1st	Heavyweight (125 kg)
2015	Grapple Nation 6 No-Gi Jiu Jitsu - European Championships	2nd	Heavyweight (O91 kg)
2015	Grapple Nation 5 No-Gi Jiu Jitsu - Advanced Category	3rd	Heavyweight (97.44 kg)
2014	British Open Wrestling Championships	3rd (2nd)	Light Heavyweight (97 kg)
2014	British Closed Wrestling Championships	1st	Light Heavyweight (97 kg)
2014	English Open Wrestling Championships	2nd	Heavyweight (120 kg)
2013	Aspull Open Wrestling Tournament	1st	Heavyweight (120 kg)
2013	FILA International Olympia Wrestling Tournament	3rd	Heavyweight (120 kg)
2013	2013 British Open Wrestling Championships	1st	Heavyweight (120 kg)
2012	2012 British Open Wrestling Championships	2nd	Heavyweight (120 kg)
2011	2011 British Open Wrestling Championships	1st	Heavyweight (120 kg)
2010	2010 Commonwealth Games Freestyle Wrestling Championships	5th	Heavyweight (120 kg)
2010	2010 Commonwealth Games Greco-Roman Wrestling Championships	5th	Heavyweight (120 kg)
2010	2010 England Commonwealth Games Wrestling Trials	1st	Heavyweight (120 kg)
2010	2010 FILA International Great Britain Cup of Wrestling	2nd	Heavyweight (120 kg)
2010	2010 English Open Wrestling Championships	1st	Heavyweight (120 kg)
2009	2009 British Open Wrestling Championships	3rd	Heavyweight (120 kg)

== International results ==
Year	Tournament	Place	Weight class
2018	ADCC British Open - Professional	2nd	Heavyweight (99 kg)
2013	International Olympia Tournament	3rd	Heavyweight (120 kg)
2011	European Championship	18th	Heavyweight (120 kg)
2010	Commonwealth Games - Freestyle	5th	Heavyweight (120 kg)
2010	Commonwealth Games - Greco-Roman	5th	Heavyweight (120 kg)
2010	Great Britain Cup	2nd	Heavyweight (120 kg)
2002	World University Championship	7th	Heavyweight (96 kg)
1998	World Championship	14th	Heavyweight (76 kg)

== Teacher ==
Cocker was an assistant and deputy headteacher at Sale High School, Manchester. In January 2016 he moved to Pleckgate High School, Blackburn as headteacher. In January 2019, Pleckgate High School was rated as outstanding by Ofsted in all categories.

== Documentary ==
In 2002, Cocker was part of the documentary Catch – The Hold Not Taken, which was created to investigate the roots of different styles of wrestling such as freestyle and catch wrestling, and how wrestling has evolved over the decades. The documentary starred Cocker alongside UFC veteran Dan Severn and Olympic gold medallist Dan Gable.

== Elite Athlete Coaching ==
Cocker is the current Great Britain senior wrestling coach and an accredited UKCC level 2 coach, predominantly coaching wrestling to elite wrestlers and mixed martial artists. UFC competitor, BAMMA world champion and KSW World Champion Scott Askham, BAMMA World Champion and UFC competitor Marc Diakiese, Cage Warriors World Champion Andrew Clamp and Cage Warriors World Champion Ieuan Davies have all been coached by Cocker. Cocker has also coached several other national champions, including the 2019 and 2022 British Freestyle Wrestling champion at 97 kg, Ash Roden.
