= Harry Kendall (wrestler) =

English wrestler

Personal information
- Nationality: British (English)
- Born: London, England
- Died: 30 December 2015

Sport
- Sport: Wrestling
- Event: Middleweight
- Club: Foresters; Olympic AWC, Walworth
Medal record
Men's freestyle wrestling
Representing England
British Empire & Commonwealth Games
Bronze medal – third place	1954 Vancouver	82 kg

Harry Kendall (?-30 December 2015) was a wrestler who competed for England.

== Biography ==
Kendall represented the English team at the 1954 British Empire and Commonwealth Games held in Vancouver, Canada, where he won the bronze medal in the middleweight category.

Kendall was beaten in the final of the British 1957 heavyweight championship, held at the Royal Albert Hall. He also represented England in the -90 Kg at the 1958 British Empire and Commonwealth Games in Cardiff, Wales.

Kendall was a three-times winner of the British Wrestling Championships in 1953, 1954 and 1958.

As a professional he was called one of the original Silent Ones alongside Mike Eagers because they were deaf.
