= Chinu Sandhu =

British freestyle wrestler

Personal information
- Nationality: British
- Born: 6 June 1987 (age 39) Ludhiana, India
- Weight: 120 kg (260 lb)

Sport
- Sport: Wrestling
- Event: Men's 125 kg
Medal record
Men's freestyle wrestling
Representing England
Commonwealth Games
Bronze medal – third place	2014 Glasgow	125 kg

Chinu Sandhu (born 6 June 1987) is a British freestyle wrestler. He also goes by the name Chinu Chinu and Chinu XXX.

== Biography ==
Chinu competed for England in the men's freestyle 125 kg event at the 2014 Commonwealth Games, where he won a bronze medal. Chinu beat Claude Mbianga from Cameroon in the wrestling 125 kg men's freestyle "round of sixteen" (actually only four, since there were ten competitors in total, six getting byes) to progress to the quarter-finals where he beat Zaman Anwar from Pakistan. In the semifinals he lost to eventual gold medal winner Canadian Korey Jarvis. He beat Hollis Mkanga from Kenya in the repechage to win one of the two bronze medals for the event.

He won four titles at the British Wrestling Championships.

In 2017 Sandhu received a four-year ban for a doping violation.
