= Joseph Gilligan =

British wrestler (born 1954)

Joey Gilligan
Personal information
- Nationality: British (English)
- Born: 7 November 1954 (age 71) Manchester, England
- Height: 174 cm (5 ft 9 in)
- Weight: 68 kg (150 lb)

Sport
- Sport: Amateur wrestling
Medal record
Men's freestyle wrestling
Representing England
Commonwealth Games
| Silver medal – second place | 1974 Christchurch | 68 kg |
| Silver medal – second place | 1978 Edmonton | 68 kg |

Joseph "Joe" Gilligan (born 7 November 1954) is a male retired British amateur wrestler.

== Wrestling career ==
He competed at the 1972 Summer Olympics and the 1976 Summer Olympics. He represented England and won a silver medal in the 68kg lightweight division, at the 1974 British Commonwealth Games in Christchurch, New Zealand. Four years later he represented England again and won another silver medal in the same weight class, at the 1978 Commonwealth Games in Edmonton, Canada. A third appearance for England at the 1982 Commonwealth Games in Brisbane, Australia resulted in a fourth place finish.

Gilligan was an eight-times winner of the British Wrestling Championships in 1973, 1974, 1975, 1976, 1978, 1979 1980 and 1982.
