= Iran at the 1956 Summer Olympics =

- IOC code: IRI (IRN used at these Games)
- NOC: National Olympic Committee of Iran

in Melbourne, Australia and Stockholm, Sweden
- Competitors: 17 in 3 sports
- Flag bearer: Mahmoud Namjoo
- Medals Ranked 14th: Gold 2 Silver 2 Bronze 1 Total 5

Summer Olympics appearances (overview)
- 1900; 1904–1936; 1948; 1952; 1956; 1960; 1964; 1968; 1972; 1976; 1980–1984; 1988; 1992; 1996; 2000; 2004; 2008; 2012; 2016; 2020; 2024; 2028

Iran competed at the 1956 Summer Olympics in Melbourne, Australia; 17 athletes competed. Emam-Ali Habibi and Gholamreza Takhti won the nation's first gold medal in the Olympics, all in wrestling.

== Competitors ==
Sport	Men	Women	Total
Athletics	2		2
Weightlifting	7		7
Wrestling	8		8
Total	17	0	17

== Medal summary ==
=== Medal table ===
Sport	Gold	Silver	Bronze	Total
Weightlifting			1	1
Wrestling	2	2		4
Total	2	2	1	5

=== Medalists ===
Medal	Name	Sport	Event
Gold	Emam-Ali Habibi	Wrestling	Men's freestyle 67 kg
Gold	Gholamreza Takhti	Wrestling	Men's freestyle 87 kg
Silver	Mohammad Ali Khojastehpour	Wrestling	Men's freestyle 52 kg
Silver	Mehdi Yaghoubi	Wrestling	Men's freestyle 57 kg
Bronze	Mahmoud Namjoo	Weightlifting	Men's 56 kg

== Results by event ==
=== Athletics ===
Men

Athlete	Event	Time	Rank
Ali Baghbanbashi	Marathon	Did not finish	

Athlete	Event	100m	LJ	SP	HJ	400m	110m H	DT	PV	JT	1500m	Total	Rank
Najmeddin Farabi	Decathlon	12.1; 572	6.25; 575	11.31; 524	1.70; 656	52.3; 684	17.4; 372	28.73; 347	3.30; 438	41.23; 375	4:24.8; 560	5103	12

=== Weightlifting ===
Men

Athlete	Event	Press	Snatch	Clean & Jerk	Total	Rank
Mahmoud Namjoo	56 kg	100.0	102.5	130.0	332.5	3rd place, bronze medalist(s)
Hossein Zarini	60 kg	92.5	92.5	120.0	305.0	13
Henrik Tamraz	67.5 kg	115.0	105.0	145.0	365.0	5
Ebrahim Peiravi	75 kg	107.5	117.5	147.5	372.5	7
Jalal Mansouri	82.5 kg	132.5	122.5	162.5	417.5	4
Hassan Rahnavardi	90 kg	140.0	127.5	157.5	425.0	4
Firouz Pojhan	+90 kg	147.5	132.5	170.0	450.0	4

=== Wrestling ===
Men's freestyle

Athlete	Event	First round	Second round	Third round	Fourth round	Fifth round	Final round	Rank
Mohammad Ali Khojastehpour	52 kg	Bye	Chinazzo (ITA); W 3–0	Delgado (USA); W 3–0	Asai (JPN); W 3–0		Akbaş (TUR); W 3–0	2nd place, silver medalist(s)
Mohammad Ali Khojastehpour	52 kg	Bye	Chinazzo (ITA); W 3–0	Delgado (USA); W 3–0	Asai (JPN); W 3–0		Tsalkalamanidze (URS); L Fall	2nd place, silver medalist(s)
Mehdi Yaghoubi	57 kg	Shakhov (URS); W 3–0	Jameson (AUS); W Fall	Pandey (IND); W Fall	Dağıstanlı (TUR); L 1–2	Lee (KOR); W 3–0		2nd place, silver medalist(s)
Nasser Givehchi	62 kg	Geldenhuys (RSA); W 3–0	Hall (GBR); W Fall	Penttilä (FIN); L 1–2	Şit (TUR); L 0–3		Did not advance	6
Emam-Ali Habibi	67 kg	Anderberg (SWE); W Fall	Tóth (HUN); W 3–0	Bielle (FRA); W 3–0	Nizzola (ITA); W 3–0	Kasahara (JPN); W 3–0	Bestaev (URS); W Fall	1st place, gold medalist(s)
Nabi Sorouri	73 kg	Singh (IND); W Fall	Fischer (USA); L 0–3	Petkov (BUL); W 3–0	de Villiers (RSA); W 3–0		Did not advance	4
Abbas Zandi	79 kg	Katsuramoto (JPN); W 3–0	Bye	Atlı (TUR); L 0–3	Hodge (USA); L Fall	Did not advance		7
Gholamreza Takhti	87 kg	Theron (RSA); W Fall	Steckle (CAN); W Fall	Ohira (JPN); W Fall	Coote (AUS); W Fall		Kulaev (URS); W 3–0	1st place, gold medalist(s)
Gholamreza Takhti	87 kg	Theron (RSA); W Fall	Steckle (CAN); W Fall	Ohira (JPN); W Fall	Coote (AUS); W Fall		Blair (USA); W 3–0	1st place, gold medalist(s)
Hossein Nouri	+87 kg	Mehmedov (BUL); L 0–3	da Silva (NZL); W 3–0	Kaplan (TUR); L Fall	Did not advance		Did not advance	9
