= Wrestling at the 1960 Summer Olympics – Men's freestyle bantamweight =

Wrestling at the Olympics

Men's freestyle bantamweight at the Games of the XVII Olympiad
- Venue: Basilica of Maxentius
- Dates: 1–6 September 1960
- Competitors: 19 from 19 nations

Medalists
1st place, gold medalist(s)		Terry McCann	United States
2nd place, silver medalist(s)		Nezhdet Zalev	Bulgaria
3rd place, bronze medalist(s)		Tadeusz Trojanowski	Poland

The men's freestyle bantamweight competition at the 1960 Summer Olympics in Rome took place from 1 to 6 September at the Basilica of Maxentius. Nations were limited to one competitor. Bantamweight was the second-lightest category, including wrestlers weighing 52 to 57 kilograms (114.6 to 125.7 lb).

== Competition format ==
This freestyle wrestling competition continued to use the "bad points" elimination system introduced at the 1928 Summer Olympics for Greco-Roman and at the 1932 Summer Olympics for freestyle wrestling, though adjusted the point values slightly. Wins by fall continued to be worth 0 points and wins by decision continued to be worth 1 point. Losses by fall, however, were now worth 4 points (up from 3). Losses by decision were worth 3 points (consistent with most prior years, though in some losses by split decision had been worth only 2 points). Ties were now allowed, worth 2 points for each wrestler. The elimination threshold was also increased from 5 points to 6 points. The medal round concept, used in 1952 and 1956 requiring a round-robin amongst the medalists even if one or more finished a round with enough points for elimination, was used only if exactly three wrestlers remained after a round—if two competitors remained, they faced off head-to-head; if only one, he was the gold medalist.

== Results ==
=== Round 1 ===
Bouts

Winner	Nation	Victory Type	Loser	Nation
Luigi Chinazzo	Italy	Decision	Im Gwang-jae	South Korea
Dermot Dunne	Ireland	Fall	Vittorio Mancini	San Marino
Mohamed Mehdi Yaghoubi	Iran	Tie	Hüseyin Akbaş	Turkey
Mykhailo Shakhov	Soviet Union	Tie	Tauno Jaskari	Finland
Muhammad Siraj-Din	Pakistan	Fall	Walter Pilling	Great Britain
Fred Kämmerer	United Team of Germany	Decision	Eduardo Campbell	Panama
Terry McCann	United States	Decision	Edvin Vesterby	Sweden
Tadeusz Trojanowski	Poland	Fall	Paul Hänni	Switzerland
Nezhdet Zalev	Bulgaria	Fall	Geoffrey Jameson	Australia
Tadashi Asai	Japan	Bye	N/A	N/A

Points

Rank	Wrestler	Nation	Start	Earned	Total
1	Tadashi Asai	Japan	0	0	0
1	Dermot Dunne	Ireland	0	0	0
1	Muhammad Siraj-Din	Pakistan	0	0	0
1	Tadeusz Trojanowski	Poland	0	0	0
1	Nezhdet Zalev	Bulgaria	0	0	0
6	Luigi Chinazzo	Italy	0	1	1
6	Fred Kämmerer	United Team of Germany	0	1	1
6	Terry McCann	United States	0	1	1
9	Hüseyin Akbaş	Turkey	0	2	2
9	Tauno Jaskari	Finland	0	2	2
9	Mykhailo Shakhov	Soviet Union	0	2	2
9	Mohamed Mehdi Yaghoubi	Iran	0	2	2
13	Eduardo Campbell	Panama	0	3	3
13	Im Gwang-jae	South Korea	0	3	3
13	Edvin Vesterby	Sweden	0	3	3
16	Paul Hänni	Switzerland	0	4	4
16	Geoffrey Jameson	Australia	0	4	4
16	Vittorio Mancini	San Marino	0	4	4
16	Walter Pilling	Great Britain	0	4	4

=== Round 2 ===
Bouts

Winner	Nation	Victory Type	Loser	Nation
Tadashi Asai	Japan	Fall	Luigi Chinazzo	Italy
Im Gwang-jae	South Korea	Fall	Dermot Dunne	Ireland
Mohamed Mehdi Yaghoubi	Iran	Fall	Vittorio Mancini	San Marino
Mykhailo Shakhov	Soviet Union	Decision	Hüseyin Akbaş	Turkey
Tauno Jaskari	Finland	Decision	Muhammad Siraj-Din	Pakistan
Eduardo Campbell	Panama	Fall	Walter Pilling	Great Britain
Fred Kämmerer	United Team of Germany	Decision	Edvin Vesterby	Sweden
Terry McCann	United States	Fall	Paul Hänni	Switzerland
Tadeusz Trojanowski	Poland	Fall	Geoffrey Jameson	Australia
Nezhdet Zalev	Bulgaria	Bye	N/A	N/A

Points

Rank	Wrestler	Nation	Start	Earned	Total
1	Tadashi Asai	Japan	0	0	0
1	Tadeusz Trojanowski	Poland	0	0	0
1	Nezhdet Zalev	Bulgaria	0	0	0
4	Terry McCann	United States	1	0	1
5	Fred Kämmerer	United Team of Germany	1	1	2
5	Mohamed Mehdi Yaghoubi	Iran	2	0	2
7	Eduardo Campbell	Panama	3	0	3
7	Im Gwang-jae	South Korea	3	0	3
7	Tauno Jaskari	Finland	2	1	3
7	Mykhailo Shakhov	Soviet Union	2	1	3
7	Muhammad Siraj-Din	Pakistan	0	3	3
12	Dermot Dunne	Ireland	0	4	4
13	Hüseyin Akbaş	Turkey	2	3	5
13	Luigi Chinazzo	Italy	1	4	5
15	Edvin Vesterby	Sweden	3	3	6
16	Paul Hänni	Switzerland	4	4	8
16	Geoffrey Jameson	Australia	4	4	8
16	Vittorio Mancini	San Marino	4	4	8
16	Walter Pilling	Great Britain	4	4	8

=== Round 3 ===
Bouts

Winner	Nation	Victory Type	Loser	Nation
Nezhdet Zalev	Bulgaria	Fall	Tadashi Asai	Japan
Luigi Chinazzo	Italy	Fall	Dermot Dunne	Ireland
Mohamed Mehdi Yaghoubi	Iran	Decision	Im Gwang-jae	South Korea
Tauno Jaskari	Finland	Fall	Hüseyin Akbaş	Turkey
Mykhailo Shakhov	Soviet Union	Decision	Muhammad Siraj-Din	Pakistan
Terry McCann	United States	Decision	Eduardo Campbell	Panama
Tadeusz Trojanowski	Poland	Decision	Fred Kämmerer	United Team of Germany

Points

Rank	Wrestler	Nation	Start	Earned	Total
1	Nezhdet Zalev	Bulgaria	0	0	0
2	Tadeusz Trojanowski	Poland	0	1	1
3	Terry McCann	United States	1	1	2
4	Tauno Jaskari	Finland	3	0	3
4	Mohamed Mehdi Yaghoubi	Iran	2	1	3
6	Tadashi Asai	Japan	0	4	4
6	Mykhailo Shakhov	Soviet Union	3	1	4
8	Luigi Chinazzo	Italy	5	0	5
8	Fred Kämmerer	United Team of Germany	2	3	5
10	Eduardo Campbell	Panama	3	3	6
10	Im Gwang-jae	South Korea	3	3	6
10	Muhammad Siraj-Din	Pakistan	3	3	6
13	Dermot Dunne	Ireland	4	4	8
14	Hüseyin Akbaş	Turkey	5	4	9

=== Round 4 ===
Bouts

Winner	Nation	Victory Type	Loser	Nation
Nezhdet Zalev	Bulgaria	Decision	Luigi Chinazzo	Italy
Tadashi Asai	Japan	Decision	Mohamed Mehdi Yaghoubi	Iran
Mykhailo Shakhov	Soviet Union	Fall	Fred Kämmerer	United Team of Germany
Tauno Jaskari	Finland	Decision	Terry McCann	United States
Tadeusz Trojanowski	Poland	Bye	N/A	N/A

Points

Rank	Wrestler	Nation	Start	Earned	Total
1	Tadeusz Trojanowski	Poland	1	0	1
1	Nezhdet Zalev	Bulgaria	0	1	1
3	Tauno Jaskari	Finland	3	1	4
3	Mykhailo Shakhov	Soviet Union	4	0	4
5	Tadashi Asai	Japan	4	1	5
5	Terry McCann	United States	2	3	5
7	Mohamed Mehdi Yaghoubi	Iran	3	3	6
8	Luigi Chinazzo	Italy	5	3	8
9	Fred Kämmerer	United Team of Germany	5	4	9

=== Round 5 ===
Bouts

Winner	Nation	Victory Type	Loser	Nation
Nezhdet Zalev	Bulgaria	Decision	Tadeusz Trojanowski	Poland
Tadashi Asai	Japan	Decision	Tauno Jaskari	Finland
Terry McCann	United States	Fall	Mykhailo Shakhov	Soviet Union

Points

Rank	Wrestler	Nation	Start	Earned	Total
1	Nezhdet Zalev	Bulgaria	1	1	2
2	Tadeusz Trojanowski	Poland	1	3	4
3	Terry McCann	United States	5	0	5
4	Tadashi Asai	Japan	5	1	6
5	Tauno Jaskari	Finland	4	3	7
6	Mykhailo Shakhov	Soviet Union	4	4	8

=== Round 6 ===
With three wrestlers left, the sixth and final round required all remaining possible bouts to be wrestled rather than giving one of the remaining wrestlers the advantage of a bye. Zalev and Trojanowski had already faced each other, so each wrestled against McCann—who won both bouts to secure the gold medal.

Bouts

Winner	Nation	Victory Type	Loser	Nation
Terry McCann	United States	Decision	Tadeusz Trojanowski	Poland
Terry McCann	United States	Decision	Nezhdet Zalev	Bulgaria

Points

Rank	Wrestler	Nation	Start	Earned	Total
1st place, gold medalist(s)	Terry McCann	United States	5	2	7
2nd place, silver medalist(s)	Nezhdet Zalev	Bulgaria	2	3	5
3rd place, bronze medalist(s)	Tadeusz Trojanowski	Poland	4	3	7
