= Wrestling at the 1956 Summer Olympics =

Wrestling at the Games of the XVI Olympiad
- Venue: Royal Exhibition Building
- Dates: 28 November – 6 December
- Competitors: 173 from 30 nations

At the 1956 Summer Olympics, 16 wrestling events were contested, all for men. There were eight weight classes in Greco-Roman wrestling and eight classes in freestyle wrestling.

== Medal summary ==
=== Freestyle ===
Event	Gold	Silver	Bronze
Flyweight	Mirian Tsalkalamanidze; Soviet Union	Mohammad Ali Khojastehpour; Iran	Hüseyin Akbaş; Turkey
Bantamweight	Mustafa Dağıstanlı; Turkey	Mehdi Yaghoubi; Iran	Mikhail Shakhov; Soviet Union
Featherweight	Shozo Sasahara; Japan	Joseph Mewis; Belgium	Erkki Penttilä; Finland
Lightweight	Emam-Ali Habibi; Iran	Shigeru Kasahara; Japan	Alimbeg Bestaev; Soviet Union
Welterweight	Mitsuo Ikeda; Japan	Ibrahim Zengin; Turkey	Vakhtang Balavadze; Soviet Union
Middleweight	Nikola Stanchev; Bulgaria	Danny Hodge; United States	Georgi Skhirtladze; Soviet Union
Light heavyweight	Gholamreza Takhti; Iran	Boris Kulayev; Soviet Union	Peter Blair; United States
Heavyweight	Hamit Kaplan; Turkey	Hussein Mehmedov; Bulgaria	Taisto Kangasniemi; Finland

=== Greco-Roman ===
Event	Gold	Silver	Bronze
Flyweight	Nikolai Solovyov; Soviet Union	Ignazio Fabra; Italy	Dursun Ali Egribas; Turkey
Bantamweight	Konstantin Vyrupayev; Soviet Union	Edvin Vesterby; Sweden	Francisc Horvat; Romania
Featherweight	Rauno Mäkinen; Finland	Imre Polyák; Hungary	Roman Dzeneladze; Soviet Union
Lightweight	Kyösti Lehtonen; Finland	Riza Dogan; Turkey	Gyula Tóth; Hungary
Welterweight	Mithat Bayrak; Turkey	Vladimir Maneev; Soviet Union	Per Gunnar Berlin; Sweden
Middleweight	Givi Kartozia; Soviet Union	Dimitar Dobrev; Bulgaria	Rune Jansson; Sweden
Light Heavyweight	Valentin Nikolayev; Soviet Union	Petko Sirakov; Bulgaria	Karl-Erik Nilsson; Sweden
Heavyweight	Anatoli Parfenov; Soviet Union	Wilfried Dietrich; United Team of Germany	Adelmo Bulgarelli; Italy

== Medal table ==
Rank	Nation	Gold	Silver	Bronze	Total
1	Soviet Union	6	2	5	13
2	Turkey	3	2	2	7
3	Iran	2	2	0	4
4	Japan	2	1	0	3
5	Finland	2	0	2	4
6	Bulgaria	1	3	0	4
7	Sweden	0	1	3	4
8	Hungary	0	1	1	2
8	Italy	0	1	1	2
8	United States	0	1	1	2
11	Belgium	0	1	0	1
11	United Team of Germany	0	1	0	1
13	Romania	0	0	1	1
Totals (13 entries)		16	16	16	48

== Participating nations ==
A total of 173 wrestlers from 30 nations competed at the Melbourne Games:

- Argentina (2)
- Australia (15)
- Austria (4)
- Belgium (3)
- Bulgaria (8)
- Canada (2)
- Finland (10)
- France (2)
- United Team of Germany (5)
- Great Britain (4)
- Greece (2)
- Hungary (8)
- India (7)
- Iran (8)
- Ireland (1)
- Italy (5)
- Japan (8)
- South Korea (3)
- Mexico (1)
- New Zealand (1)
- Norway (1)
- Pakistan (6)
- Philippines (3)
- Romania (4)
- South Africa (4)
- Soviet Union (16)
- Sweden (10)
- Turkey (13)
- United States (15)
- Yugoslavia (2)
