= Wrestling at the 1956 Summer Olympics – Men's freestyle bantamweight =

Wrestling at the Olympics

Men's freestyle bantamweight at the Games of the XVI Olympiad
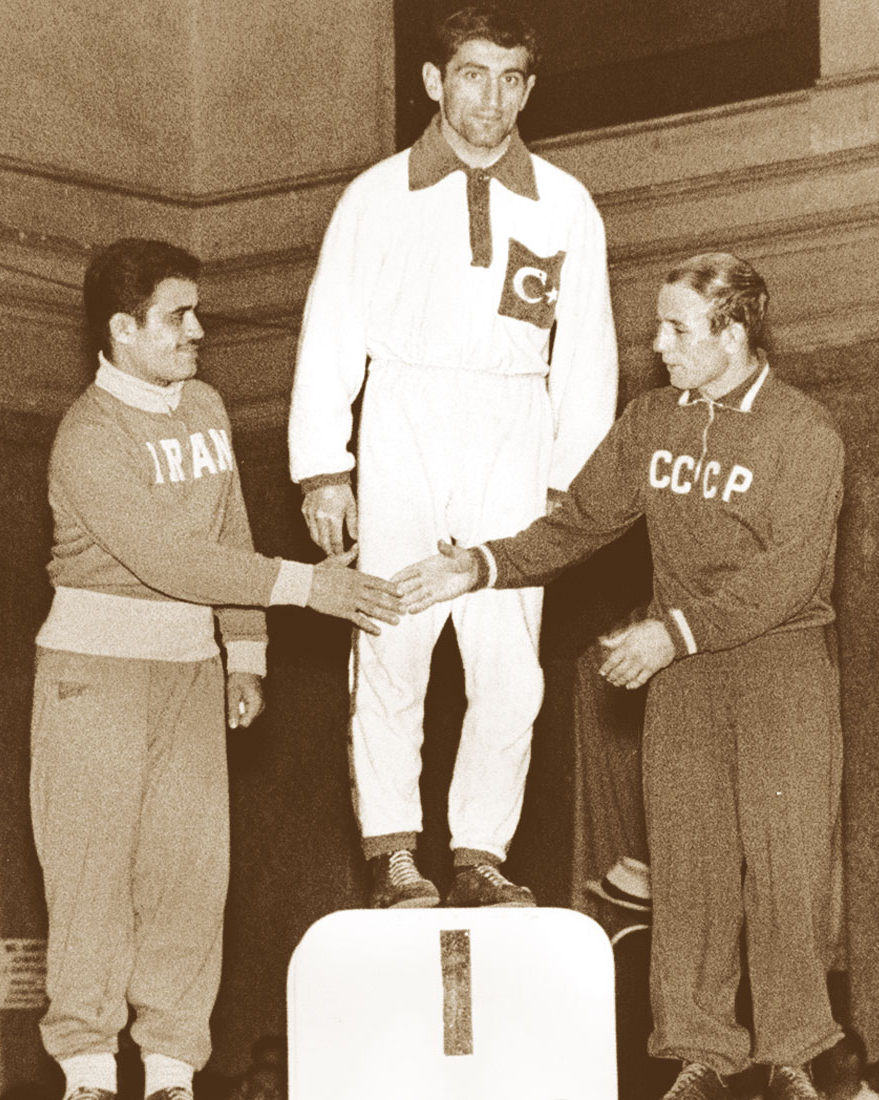
- Venue: Royal Exhibition Building
- Dates: 28 November–1 December 1956
- Competitors: 14 from 14 nations

Medalists
1st place, gold medalist(s)		Mustafa Dağıstanlı	Turkey
2nd place, silver medalist(s)		Mohamed Mehdi Yaghoubi	Iran
3rd place, bronze medalist(s)		Mykhailo Shakhov	Soviet Union

The men's freestyle bantamweight competition at the 1956 Summer Olympics in Melbourne took place from 28 November to 1 December at the Royal Exhibition Building. Nations were limited to one competitor. Bantamweight was the second-lightest category, including wrestlers weighing 52 to 57 kilograms (114.6 to 125.7 lb).

== Competition format ==
This freestyle wrestling competition continued to use the "bad points" elimination system introduced at the 1928 Summer Olympics for Greco-Roman and at the 1932 Summer Olympics for freestyle wrestling, as modified in 1952 (adding medal rounds and making all losses worth 3 points—from 1936 to 1948 losses by split decision only cost 2). Each round featured all wrestlers pairing off and wrestling one bout (with one wrestler having a bye if there were an odd number). The loser received 3 points. The winner received 1 point if the win was by decision and 0 points if the win was by fall. At the end of each round, any wrestler with at least 5 points was eliminated. This elimination continued until the medal rounds, which began when 3 wrestlers remained. These 3 wrestlers each faced each other in a round-robin medal round (with earlier results counting, if any had wrestled another before); record within the medal round determined medals, with bad points breaking ties.

== Results ==
=== Round 1 ===
Bouts

Winner	Nation	Victory Type	Loser	Nation
Mustafa Dağıstanlı	Turkey	Decision, 3–0	Minoru Iizuka	Japan
Tauno Jaskari	Finland	Decision, 3–0	Lee Allen	United States
Adolfo Díaz	Argentina	Decision, 3–0	Omer Vercouteren	Belgium
Fred Kämmerer	United Team of Germany	Decision, 3–0	Tarashkeswar Pandey	India
Mohamed Mehdi Yaghoubi	Iran	Decision, 3–0	Mykhailo Shakhov	Soviet Union
Din Zahur	Pakistan	Decision, 3–0	Geoffrey Jameson	Australia
Lee Sang-gyun	South Korea	Fall	Ernesto Ramel	Philippines

Points

Rank	Wrestler	Nation	Start	Earned	Total
1	Lee Sang-gyun	South Korea	0	0	0
2	Mustafa Dağıstanlı	Turkey	0	1	1
2	Adolfo Díaz	Argentina	0	1	1
2	Tauno Jaskari	Finland	0	1	1
2	Fred Kämmerer	United Team of Germany	0	1	1
2	Mohamed Mehdi Yaghoubi	Iran	0	1	1
2	Din Zahur	Pakistan	0	1	1
8	Lee Allen	United States	0	3	3
8	Minoru Iizuka	Japan	0	3	3
8	Geoffrey Jameson	Australia	0	3	3
8	Tarashkeswar Pandey	India	0	3	3
8	Ernesto Ramel	Philippines	0	3	3
8	Mykhailo Shakhov	Soviet Union	0	3	3
8	Omer Vercouteren	Belgium	0	3	3

=== Round 2 ===
Jaskari withdrew after his bout.

Bouts

Winner	Nation	Victory Type	Loser	Nation
Minoru Iizuka	Japan	Decision, 3–0	Tauno Jaskari	Finland
Mustafa Dağıstanlı	Turkey	Fall	Lee Allen	United States
Fred Kämmerer	United Team of Germany	Decision, 3–0	Adolfo Díaz	Argentina
Tarashkeswar Pandey	India	Decision, 3–0	Omer Vercouteren	Belgium
Mohamed Mehdi Yaghoubi	Iran	Fall	Geoffrey Jameson	Australia
Mykhailo Shakhov	Soviet Union	Fall	Ernesto Ramel	Philippines
Lee Sang-gyun	South Korea	Decision, 3–0	Din Zahur	Pakistan

Points

Rank	Wrestler	Nation	Start	Earned	Total
1	Mustafa Dağıstanlı	Turkey	1	0	1
1	Lee Sang-gyun	South Korea	0	1	1
1	Mohamed Mehdi Yaghoubi	Iran	1	0	1
4	Fred Kämmerer	United Team of Germany	1	1	2
5	Mykhailo Shakhov	Soviet Union	3	0	3
6	Adolfo Díaz	Argentina	1	3	4
6	Minoru Iizuka	Japan	3	1	4
6	Tarashkeswar Pandey	India	3	1	4
6	Din Zahur	Pakistan	1	3	4
10	Tauno Jaskari	Finland	1	3	4*
11	Lee Allen	United States	3	3	6
11	Geoffrey Jameson	Australia	3	3	6
11	Ernesto Ramel	Philippines	3	3	6
11	Omer Vercouteren	Belgium	3	3	6

=== Round 3 ===
Bouts

Winner	Nation	Victory Type	Loser	Nation
Minoru Iizuka	Japan	Fall	Adolfo Díaz	Argentina
Mustafa Dağıstanlı	Turkey	Decision, 3–0	Fred Kämmerer	United Team of Germany
Mohamed Mehdi Yaghoubi	Iran	Fall	Tarashkeswar Pandey	India
Mykhailo Shakhov	Soviet Union	Fall	Din Zahur	Pakistan
Lee Sang-gyun	South Korea	Bye	N/A	N/A

Points

Rank	Wrestler	Nation	Start	Earned	Total
1	Lee Sang-gyun	South Korea	1	0	1
1	Mohamed Mehdi Yaghoubi	Iran	1	0	1
3	Mustafa Dağıstanlı	Turkey	1	1	2
4	Mykhailo Shakhov	Soviet Union	3	0	3
5	Minoru Iizuka	Japan	4	0	4
6	Fred Kämmerer	United Team of Germany	2	3	5
7	Adolfo Díaz	Argentina	4	3	7
7	Tarashkeswar Pandey	India	4	3	7
7	Din Zahur	Pakistan	4	3	4

=== Round 4 ===
Bouts

Winner	Nation	Victory Type	Loser	Nation
Minoru Iizuka	Japan	Decision, 3–0	Lee Sang-gyun	South Korea
Mustafa Dağıstanlı	Turkey	Decision, 2–1	Mohamed Mehdi Yaghoubi	Iran
Mykhailo Shakhov	Soviet Union	Bye	N/A	N/A

Points

Rank	Wrestler	Nation	Start	Earned	Total
1	Mustafa Dağıstanlı	Turkey	2	1	3
1	Mykhailo Shakhov	Soviet Union	3	0	3
3	Lee Sang-gyun	South Korea	1	3	4
3	Mohamed Mehdi Yaghoubi	Iran	1	3	4
5	Minoru Iizuka	Japan	4	1	5

=== Round 5 ===
Bouts

Winner	Nation	Victory Type	Loser	Nation
Mustafa Dağıstanlı	Turkey	Decision, 3–0	Mykhailo Shakhov	Soviet Union
Mohamed Mehdi Yaghoubi	Iran	Decision, 3–0	Lee Sang-gyun	South Korea

Points

Rank	Wrestler	Nation	Start	Earned	Total
1	Mustafa Dağıstanlı	Turkey	3	1	4
2	Mohamed Mehdi Yaghoubi	Iran	4	1	5
3	Mykhailo Shakhov	Soviet Union	3	3	6
4	Lee Sang-gyun	South Korea	4	3	7

=== Medal rounds ===
Each of the three medalists had already faced the others two already, so no additional bouts were used. The results consisted of Dağıstanlı's victories over Yaghoubi in round 4 and Shakhov in round 5 and Yaghoubi's victory over Shakhov in round 1. This gave Dağıstanlı a 2–0 record against the other medalists and therefore the gold medal; Yaghoubi a 1–1 record and the silver medal, and Shakhov a 0–2 record and the bronze medal.

Points

Rank	Wrestler	Nation	Wins	Losses
1st place, gold medalist(s)	Mustafa Dağıstanlı	Turkey	2	0
2nd place, silver medalist(s)	Mohamed Mehdi Yaghoubi	Iran	1	1
3rd place, bronze medalist(s)	Mykhailo Shakhov	Soviet Union	0	2
