= India at the 1958 British Empire and Commonwealth Games =

- CG code: IND
- CGA: Indian Olympic Association
- Website: olympic.ind.in

in Cardiff, Wales
- Competitors: 16
- Medals Ranked 8th: Gold 2 Silver 1 Bronze 0 Total 3

British Empire and Commonwealth Games appearances
- 1934; 1938; 1950; 1954; 1958; 1962; 1966; 1970; 1974; 1978; 1982; 1986; 1990; 1994; 1998; 2002; 2006; 2010; 2014; 2018; 2022; 2026; 2030

India competed at the 1958 British Empire and Commonwealth Games, held in Cardiff, from 18 to 26 July 1958. It was the country's fourth appearance at the Commonwealth Games after its debut at the 1934 British Empire Games. The Indian contingent consisted of 16 athletes who competed in 16 events across three sports. Track and field athletes Stephie D'Souza and Elizabeth Davenport became the first Indian women to compete at the Commonwealth Games.

India won three medals including two gold medals and a bronze medal to be ranked eighth in the overall medal table. Sprinter Milkha Singh became the first Indian to win a gold medal at the Commonwealth Games, and wrestler Lila Ram added a second gold medal.

== Medalists ==
India won three medals including two gold medals and a bronze medal to be ranked eighth in the overall medal table. Sprinter Milkha Singh became the first Indian to win a gold medal at the Commonwealth Games, and wrestler Lila Ram added a second gold medal.

Medal	Name	Sport	Event
(gold) Gold	Milkha Singh	Athletics	Men's 440 yards
(gold) Gold	Lila Ram	Wrestling	Men's heavyweight
(silver) Silver	Lachmi Kant Pandey	Wrestling	Men's welterweight

== Competitors ==
The Indian contingent consisted of 16 athletes who competed in 16 events across three sports. Track and field athletes Stephie D'Souza and Elizabeth Davenport became the first Indian women to compete at the Commonwealth Games.

Sport	Men	Women	Total
Athletics	10	2	12
Boxing	2	—N/a	2
Wrestling	2	—N/a	2
Total	14	2	16

== Athletics ==
India won its first Commonwealth Games gold medal at the 1958 Games, with sprinter Milkha Singh winning the gold medal in the men's 440-yard run with a time of 46.6 seconds.

=== Track ===
Athlete	Event	Heat		Quarterfinal		Semifinal		Final	
Athlete	Event	Result	Rank	Result	Rank	Result	Rank	Result	Rank
Stephie D'Souza	Women's 100 yds	12.0	4	—N/a		Did not qualify			
Stephie D'Souza	Women's 220 yds	26.2	4	—N/a		Did not qualify			
Milkha Singh	Men's 440 yds	48.9	1 Q	47.0	1 Q	47.4	1 Q	46.6	1st place, gold medalist(s)
Daljit Singh	Men's 440 yds	50.2	4	Did not qualify					
Jagdev Singh	Men's 440 yds hurdles	55.4	5	—N/a		Did not qualify			
Wahid Usmani	Men's 440 yds hurdles	57.0	5	—N/a		Did not qualify			
Milkha Singh; Daljit Singh; Wahid Usmani; Alex Silvera	Men's 4 × 440 yds relay	3:15.5	3 Q	—N/a				3:15.3	5

Legend

- Q – Qualified for the next round

=== Field ===
Athlete	Event	Qualification		Final	
Athlete	Event	Result	Rank	Result	Rank
Balkar Singh	Men's discus throw	—N/a		148 ft 0 1/2 in (45.12 m)	10
Balkar Singh	Men's hammer throw	—N/a		DNS	
Parduman Singh Brar	Men's discus throw	—N/a		144 ft 0 1/2 in (43.90 m)	12
Parduman Singh Brar	Men's shot put	—N/a		46 ft 3 1/4 in (14.10 m)	4
Elizabeth Davenport	Women's javelin throw	—N/a		132 ft 11 1/2 in (40.53 m)	7
Saranjit Singh	Men's high jump	6 ft 1 in (1.854 m)	20	Did not qualify	
Mohinder Singh	Men's long jump	DNS		Did not qualify	
Mohinder Singh	Men's triple jump	47 ft 6 1/2 in (14.49 m)	11	Did not qualify	
Ram Mehar	Men's long jump	Bye		23 ft 1 in (7.036 m)	12

== Boxing ==
India participated in boxing for the first time at the Commonwealth Games. It competed in the men's lightweight division (60 kg) and the men's middleweight division (75 kg).

Athlete	Event	Preliminary Round	Quarterfinal	Semifinal	Final	
Athlete	Event	Opposition Result	Opposition Result	Opposition Result	Opposition Result	Rank
R. Sunder	Lightweight 60 kg	—N/a	Cooke (ENG); L VPO	Did not advance		
Hari Singh	Middleweight 75 kg	Waters (WAL); W RSC	Milligan (NIR); L WO	Did not advance		

Legend

- W – Win; L – Loss;
- RSC – Referee stops contest
- VPO – Victory by points
- WO – Walkover

== Wrestling ==
Heavyweight wrestler Lila Ram won the other gold medal for India in the men's heavyweight category, and Lachmi Kant Pandey won the silver medal in the men's welterweight division (74 kg).

Freestyle men

Athlete	Event	Round of 16	Quarterfinal	Semifinal	Final	
Athlete	Event	Opposition Result	Opposition Result	Opposition Result	Opposition Result	Rank
Lachmi Kant Pandey	Welterweight 74 kg	McKenzie (SCO); W VPO	de Villiers (RSA); W VPO	Bambacus (AUS); W VPO	Bashir (PAK); L VPO	2nd place, silver medalist(s)
Lila Ram	Heavyweight 100 kg	Harvey (WAL); W VFA	Costello (CAN); W VPO	Mitchell (AUS); W VFA	Hanekom (RSA); W VPO	1st place, gold medalist(s)

Legend

- W – Win; L – Loss;
- VFA – Victory by fall
- VPO – Victory by points
