= Wrestling at the 1956 Summer Olympics – Men's freestyle light heavyweight =

Wrestling at the Olympics

Men's freestyle light heavyweight at the Games of the XVI Olympiad
- Venue: Royal Exhibition Building
- Dates: 28 November–1 December 1956
- Competitors: 12 from 12 nations

Medalists
1st place, gold medalist(s)		Gholam Reza Takhti	Iran
2nd place, silver medalist(s)		Boris Kulayev	Soviet Union
3rd place, bronze medalist(s)		Pete Blair	United States

The men's freestyle light heavyweight competition at the 1956 Summer Olympics in Melbourne took place from 28 November to 1 December at the Royal Exhibition Building. Nations were limited to one competitor. Light heavyweight was the second-heaviest category, including wrestlers weighing 79 to 87 kilograms (174.2 to 191.8 lb).

== Competition format ==
This freestyle wrestling competition continued to use the "bad points" elimination system introduced at the 1928 Summer Olympics for Greco-Roman and at the 1932 Summer Olympics for freestyle wrestling, as modified in 1952 (adding medal rounds and making all losses worth 3 points—from 1936 to 1948 losses by split decision only cost 2). Each round featured all wrestlers pairing off and wrestling one bout (with one wrestler having a bye if there were an odd number). The loser received 3 points. The winner received 1 point if the win was by decision and 0 points if the win was by fall. At the end of each round, any wrestler with at least 5 points was eliminated. This elimination continued until the medal rounds, which began when 3 wrestlers remained. These 3 wrestlers each faced each other in a round-robin medal round (with earlier results counting, if any had wrestled another before); record within the medal round determined medals, with bad points breaking ties.

== Results ==
=== Round 1 ===
Defteraios withdrew after his bout.

Bouts

Winner	Nation	Victory Type	Loser	Nation
Kevin Coote	Australia	Decision, 3–0	Bob Steckle	Canada
Gholam Reza Takhti	Iran	Fall	Jan Theron	South Africa
Peter Blair	United States	Fall	Veikko Lahti	Finland
Adil Atan	Turkey	Fall	Mitsuhiro Ohira	Japan
Boris Kulayev	Soviet Union	Decision, 3–0	Viking Palm	Sweden
Gerry Martina	Ireland	Fall	Spyros Defteraios	Greece

Points

Rank	Wrestler	Nation	Start	Earned	Total
1	Adil Atan	Turkey	0	0	0
1	Peter Blair	United States	0	0	0
1	Gerry Martina	Ireland	0	0	0
1	Gholam Reza Takhti	Iran	0	0	0
5	Kevin Coote	Australia	0	1	1
5	Boris Kulayev	Soviet Union	0	1	1
7	Veikko Lahti	Finland	0	3	3
7	Mitsuhiro Ohira	Japan	0	3	3
7	Viking Palm	Sweden	0	3	3
7	Bob Steckle	Canada	0	3	3
7	Jan Theron	South Africa	0	3	3
12	Spyros Defteraios	Greece	0	3	3*

=== Round 2 ===
Bouts

Winner	Nation	Victory Type	Loser	Nation
Jan Theron	South Africa	Decision, 3–0	Kevin Coote	Australia
Gholam Reza Takhti	Iran	Fall	Bob Steckle	Canada
Mitsuhiro Ohira	Japan	Decision, 2–1	Veikko Lahti	Finland
Viking Palm	Sweden	Decision, 3–0	Peter Blair	United States
Boris Kulayev	Soviet Union	Decision, 2–1	Adil Atan	Turkey
Gerry Martina	Ireland	Bye	N/A	N/A

Points

Rank	Wrestler	Nation	Start	Earned	Total
1	Gerry Martina	Ireland	0	0	0
1	Gholam Reza Takhti	Iran	0	0	0
3	Boris Kulayev	Soviet Union	1	1	2
4	Adil Atan	Turkey	0	3	3
4	Peter Blair	United States	0	3	3
6	Kevin Coote	Australia	1	3	4
6	Mitsuhiro Ohira	Japan	3	1	4
6	Viking Palm	Sweden	3	1	4
6	Jan Theron	South Africa	3	1	4
10	Veikko Lahti	Finland	3	3	6
10	Bob Steckle	Canada	3	3	6

=== Round 3 ===
Bouts

Winner	Nation	Victory Type	Loser	Nation
Kevin Coote	Australia	Fall	Gerry Martina	Ireland
Peter Blair	United States	Fall	Jan Theron	South Africa
Gholam Reza Takhti	Iran	Fall	Mitsuhiro Ohira	Japan
Adil Atan	Turkey	Decision, 2–1	Viking Palm	Sweden
Boris Kulayev	Soviet Union	Bye	N/A	N/A

Points

Rank	Wrestler	Nation	Start	Earned	Total
1	Gholam Reza Takhti	Iran	0	0	0
2	Boris Kulayev	Soviet Union	2	0	2
3	Peter Blair	United States	3	0	3
3	Gerry Martina	Ireland	0	3	3
5	Adil Atan	Turkey	3	1	4
5	Kevin Coote	Australia	4	0	4
7	Mitsuhiro Ohira	Japan	4	3	7
7	Viking Palm	Sweden	4	3	7
7	Jan Theron	South Africa	4	3	7

=== Round 4 ===
Bouts

Winner	Nation	Victory Type	Loser	Nation
Boris Kulayev	Soviet Union	Fall	Gerry Martina	Ireland
Gholam Reza Takhti	Iran	Fall	Kevin Coote	Australia
Peter Blair	United States	Decision, 3–0	Adil Atan	Turkey

Points

Rank	Wrestler	Nation	Start	Earned	Total
1	Gholam Reza Takhti	Iran	0	0	0
2	Boris Kulayev	Soviet Union	2	0	2
3	Peter Blair	United States	3	1	4
4	Gerry Martina	Ireland	3	3	6
5	Adil Atan	Turkey	4	3	7
5	Kevin Coote	Australia	4	3	7

=== Medal rounds ===
None of the medalists had faced each other yet, so a full round-robin was held. Takhti beat each of the other two medalists to win the gold medal, with Kulayev earning silver by beating Blair.

Bouts

Winner	Nation	Victory Type	Loser	Nation
Gholam Reza Takhti	Iran	Fall	Boris Kulayev	Soviet Union
Boris Kulayev	Soviet Union	Fall	Peter Blair	United States
Gholam Reza Takhti	Iran	Decision, 3–0	Peter Blair	United States

Points

Rank	Wrestler	Nation	Wins	Losses
1st place, gold medalist(s)	Gholam Reza Takhti	Iran	2	0
2nd place, silver medalist(s)	Boris Kulayev	Soviet Union	1	1
3rd place, bronze medalist(s)	Peter Blair	United States	0	2
