= Wrestling at the 1958 British Empire and Commonwealth Games =

- Venue: Sophia Gardens Pavilion
- Location: Cardiff, Wales
- Dates: 18 to 26 July 1958

Wrestling at the 1958 British Empire and Commonwealth Games was the sixth appearance of Wrestling at the Commonwealth Games. The events were held in Cardiff, Wales, and featured contests in eight weight classes.

The wrestling events were held in the Sophia Gardens Pavilion. South Africa topped the boxing medal table by virtue of winning four gold medals.

== Medal table ==
* Host nation (Wales)

Medals won by nation with totals, ranked by number of golds—sortable
Rank	Nation	Gold	Silver	Bronze	Total
1	South Africa	4	1	3	8
2	Pakistan	3	3	0	6
3	India	1	1	0	2
4	Scotland	0	2	0	2
5	Australia	0	1	1	2
6	Canada	0	0	2	2
6	England	0	0	2	2
8	Ceylon	0	0	0	0
8	New Zealand	0	0	0	0
8	Wales*	0	0	0	0
Totals (10 entries)		8	8	8	24

== Medallists ==
Event	Gold	Silver	Bronze
Flyweight 52kg	Ian Epton (SAF)	Shujah-ud-Din (PAK)	Fred Flannery (CAN)
Bantamweight 57kg	Muhammad Akhtar (PAK)	Geoff Jameson (AUS)	Daniel van der Walt (SAF)
Featherweight 62kg	Abraham Geldenhuys (SAF)	Siraj-ud-Din (PAK)	Bert Aspen (ENG)
Lightweight 68kg	Muhammad Ashraf (PAK)	Alastair Duncan (SCO)	Anthony Ries (SAF)
Welterweight 74kg	Muhammad Bashir (PAK)	Lachmi Kant Pandey (IND)	Coenraad de Villiers (SAF)
Middleweight 82kg	Manie van Zyl (SAF)	George Farquhar (SCO)	Ray Myland (ENG)
Light heavyweight 90kg	Jan Theron (SAF)	Muhammad Ali (PAK)	Bob Steckle (CAN)
Heavyweight 100kg	Lila Ram Sangwan (IND)	Jacobus Hanekom (SAF)	Ray Mitchell (AUS)

== Results ==
=== Flyweight 52kg ===
Winner	Loser	Score
Fred Flannery (CAN)	Ian Epton (SAF)	points
Peter Christie (ENG)	Sid Griffiths (WAL)	fall 4.31
Shujah-ud-Din (PAK)	Jock Bews (SCO)	fall 5.06
Epton	Griffiths	w/o
Flannery	Bews	fall 2.20
ud Din	Christie	fall 7.10
Epton	ud Din	fall 3.50
ud Din	Flannery	fall 5.42

Final positions: 1. Epton 2. ud-Din 3. Flannery 4. Christie 5.= Bews, Griffiths

=== Bantamweight 57kg ===
Winner	Loser	Score
Daniel van der Walt (SAF)	Jim Turnbull (SCO)	points
Dennis Gilligan (ENG)	C. Isitore (CEY)	points
Muhammad Akhtar (PAK)	Geoff Jameson (AUS)	points
der Walt	Isitore	
Jameson	Gilligan	fall 8.40
Akhtar	Turnbull	points
Jameson	der Walt	fall 11.59
Akhtar	Gilligan	points
Akhtar	der Walt	w/o

Final positions: 1. Akhtar 2. Jameson 3. van der Walt 4. Gilligan 5. Turnbull 6. Isitore

=== Featherweight 62kg ===
Winner	Loser	Score
Abraham Geldenhuys (SAF)	W J McKee (AUS)	fall 1.35
Bert Aspen (ENG)	Brian Bognuda (NZL)	points
Siraj-ud-Din (PAK)	R Casperon (CAN)	points
Robert Parsons (SCO)	F. H. Silva (CEY)	fall 1.39
Aspen	McKee	fall 1.50
Geldenhuys	Bognuda	fall 2.10
ud Din	Parsons	fall 4.12
Casperon	Silva	fall 4.35
Geldenhuys	ud-Din	draw
Aspen	Casperon	draw
Geldenhuys	Parsons	fall 6.01
Geldenhuys	Casperon	fall 3.50
Geldenhuys	Aspen	fall 11.10

Final positions: 1. Geldenhuys 2. ud-Duin 3. Aspen 4. Casperon 5. Parsons, 6.=Bognuda, Silva, McKee

=== Lightweight 68kg ===
Winner	Loser	Score
Herbie Hall (ENG)	Reg Yates (WAL)	fall 1.26
Anthony Ries (SAF)	Ray Lougheed (CAN)	points
B. H. V. Perera (CEY)	Phillip James Medlin (AUS)	fall 11.34
Muhammad Ashraf (PAK)	Alastair Duncan (SCO)	points
Hall	Lougheed	points
Ries	Yates	fall 1.59
Duncan	Medlin	draw
Ashraf	Perera	fall 0.43
Ashraf	Hall	points
Duncan	Ries	fall 4.10
Ashraf	Ries	points

Final positions: 1. Ashraf 2. Duncan 3. Ries 4. Hall 5. Medlin 6.= Perera, Lougheed, Yates

=== Welterweight 74kg ===
Winner	Loser	Score
Lachmi Kant Pandey (IND)	George McKenzie (SCO)	points
Coenraad de Villiers (SAF)	David Ickringill (ENG)	points
Con Nicholas Bambacus (AUS)	Tony Scott (WAL)	fall 4.02
Kenneth Boese (CAN)	Gordon Hobson (NZL)	points
Muhammad Bashir (PAK)	McKenzie	points
Pandey	De Villiers	points
Bambacus	Ickringill	points
Hobson	Scott	points
Bashir	Boese	ret 6.00
Pandey	Bambacus	points
de Villiers	Hobson	fall 4.41
Bashir	Pandey	points
De Villiers	Bambacus	points

Final positions: 1. Bashir 2. Pandey 3. de Villiers 4. Bambacus 5=. Boese, Hobson 7=. Ickringill, McKenzie, Scott

=== Middleweight 82kg ===
Winner	Loser	Score
George Farquhar (SCO)	Jim Runzer (CAN)	fall 4.52
Ray Myland (ENG)	Geoffrey Bailey (WAL)	fall 0.59
Manie van Zyl (SAF)	Fred Murphy (AUS)	fall 6.05
Abdul Rashid (PAK)	Barrie E. Courtney (NZL)	points
Farquhar	Bailey	fall 2.43
Myland	Runzer	points
van Zyl	Courtney	points
Murphy	Rashid	draw
Farquhar	Myland	fall 2.41
van Zyl	Rashid	w/o
van Zyl	Farquhar	fall 3.50
van Zyl	Myland	fall 2.50

Final positions: 1. van Zyl 2. Farquhar 3. Myland 4. Rashid 5. Murphy 6.= Runzer, Courtney, Bailey

=== Light heavyweight 90kg ===
Winner	Loser	Score
Roger Montague Fowler (AUS)	John Dodd (WAL)	fall 1.45
Jan Theron (SAF)	Harry Kendall (ENG)	fall 4.50
Muhammad Ali (PAK)	Angus McRitchie (SCO)	points
Bob Steckle (CAN)	Dodd	fall 1.15
Theron	Fowler	points
Kendall	McRitchie	fall 1.53
Ali	Steckle	points
Kendall	Fowler	points
Theron	Steckle	fall 7.57
Ali	Theron	draw
Steckle	Kendall	points

Final positions: 1. Theron 2. Ali 3. Steckle 4. Kendall 5. Fowler 6.= McRitchie, Dodd

=== Heavyweight 100kg ===
Winner	Loser	Score
Muhammad Nazir (PAK)	Kenneth Richmond (ENG)	draw
Ray Mitchell (AUS)	John da Silva (NZL)	points
Jacobus Hanekom (SAF)	J. Costello (CAN)	fall 1.03
Lila Ram Sangwan (IND)	Eric Harvey (WAL)	fall 5.00
Mitchell	Nazir	points
Silva	Richmond	fall 5.20
Hanekom	Harvey	fall 5.32
Ram	Costello	points
Nazir	Silva	points
Hanekom	Mitchell	points
Ram	Mitchell	fall 4.55
Ram	Hanekom	points

Final positions: 1. Ram 2. Hanekom 3. Mitchell 4. Nazir 5. Silva 6.=Costello, Richmond, Harvey.
