= 1957 World Wrestling Championships =

- Host city: Istanbul, Turkey
- Dates: 1–3 June 1957

Champions
- Freestyle: Turkey

The 1957 World Freestyle Wrestling Championship were held in Istanbul, Turkey from 1 to 3 June 1957.

== Medal table ==
Rank	Nation	Gold	Silver	Bronze	Total
1	Turkey	4	2	2	8
2	Soviet Union	2	3	1	6
3	Iran	1	1	0	2
4	Bulgaria	1	0	2	3
5	Finland	0	1	0	1
5	West Germany	0	1	0	1
7	Japan	0	0	2	2
8	Italy	0	0	1	1
Totals (8 entries)		8	8	8	24

== Team ranking ==
Rank	Men's freestyle	
Rank	Team	Points
1	Turkey	42
2	Soviet Union	35
3	Iran	20
4	Bulgaria	18
5	Japan	15
6	West Germany	9

== Medal summary ==
Event	Gold	Silver	Bronze
Flyweight; 52 kg	Mehmet Kartal; Turkey	Mirian Tsalkalamanidze; Soviet Union	Luigi Chinazzo; Italy
Bantamweight; 57 kg	Hüseyin Akbaş; Turkey	Tauno Jaskari; Finland	Yasuyuki Shimamura; Japan
Featherweight; 62 kg	Mustafa Dağıstanlı; Turkey	Hossein Mollaghasemi; Iran	Norayr Musheghyan; Soviet Union
Lightweight; 67 kg	Alimbeg Bestaev; Soviet Union	Hayrullah Şahinkaya; Turkey	Kazuo Abe; Japan
Welterweight; 73 kg	Vakhtang Balavadze; Soviet Union	İsmail Ogan; Turkey	Murtaza Murtazov; Bulgaria
Middleweight; 79 kg	Nabi Sorouri; Iran	Georgy Skhirtladze; Soviet Union	Hasan Güngör; Turkey
Light heavyweight 87 kg	Petko Sirakov; Bulgaria	Boris Kulaev; Soviet Union	İsmet Atlı; Turkey
Heavyweight +87 kg	Hamit Kaplan; Turkey	Wilfried Dietrich; West Germany	Husein Mehmedov; Bulgaria
