= Wrestling at the 1958 Asian Games – Men's freestyle 57 kg =

Men's freestyle 57 kg at the 1958 Asian Games
- Venue: Korakuen Ice Palace
- Dates: 25–27 May 1958
- Competitors: 5 from 5 nations

Medalists
| gold medal | Minoru Iizuka | Japan |
| silver medal | Muhammad Akhtar | Pakistan |
| bronze medal | Gholam Hossein Zandi | Iran |

The men's freestyle 57 kilograms (bantamweight) freestyle wrestling competition at the 1958 Asian Games in Tokyo was held from 25 to 27 May 1958.

The competition used a form of negative points tournament, with negative points given for any result short of a fall. Accumulation of 6 negative points eliminated the wrestler. When three wrestlers remained, they advanced to a final round. These 3 wrestlers each faced each other in a round-robin (with earlier results counting, if any had wrestled another before); record within the medal round determined medals, with bad points breaking ties.

== Schedule ==
All times are Japan Standard Time (UTC+09:00)

| Date | Time | Event |
|---|---|---|
| Sunday, 25 May 1958 | 11:00 | First round |
| Monday, 26 May 1958 | 10:00 | Second round |
| Monday, 26 May 1958 | 19:00 | Third round |
| Tuesday, 27 May 1958 | 10:00 | Fourth round |

== Results ==
=== First round ===
| TBM | | BM | | BM | | TBM |
|---|---|---|---|---|---|---|
| 3 | Im Kwang-jae (KOR) | 3 | Decision | 1 | Gholam Hossein Zandi (IRN) | 1 |
| 1 | Minoru Iizuka (JPN) | 1 | Decision | 3 | Muhammad Akhtar (PAK) | 3 |
| 0 | Tortillano Tumasis (PHI) | | | | Bye | |

=== Second round ===
| TBM | | BM | | BM | | TBM |
|---|---|---|---|---|---|---|
| 4 | Tortillano Tumasis (PHI) | 4 | Fall 4:53 | 0 | Im Kwang-jae (KOR) | 3 |
| 3 | Gholam Hossein Zandi (IRN) | 2 | Draw | 2 | Minoru Iizuka (JPN) | 3 |
| 3 | Muhammad Akhtar (PAK) | | | | Bye | |

=== Third round ===
| TBM | | BM | | BM | | TBM |
|---|---|---|---|---|---|---|
| 3 | Gholam Hossein Zandi (IRN) | 0 | Fall 1:46 | 4 | Tortillano Tumasis (PHI) | 8 |
| 5 | Muhammad Akhtar (PAK) | 2 | Draw | 2 | Im Kwang-jae (KOR) | 5 |
| 3 | Minoru Iizuka (JPN) | | | | Bye | |

=== Fourth round ===
| TBM | | BM | | BM | | TBM |
|---|---|---|---|---|---|---|
| 4 | Minoru Iizuka (JPN) | 1 | Decision | 3 | Im Kwang-jae (KOR) | 8 |
| 6 | Muhammad Akhtar (PAK) | 1 | Decision | 3 | Gholam Hossein Zandi (IRN) | 6 |

== Final standing ==
| Rank | Athlete | Round | | | | TBM | FBM |
| Rank | Athlete | 1 | 2 | 3 | 4 | TBM | FBM |
|---|---|---|---|---|---|---|---|
| 1st place, gold medalist(s) | Minoru Iizuka (JPN) | 1 | 2 | Bye | 1 | 4 | 3 |
| 2nd place, silver medalist(s) | Muhammad Akhtar (PAK) | 3 | Bye | 2 | 1 | 6 | 4 |
| 3rd place, bronze medalist(s) | Gholam Hossein Zandi (IRN) | 1 | 2 | 0 | 3 | 6 | 5 |
| 4 | Im Kwang-jae (KOR) | 3 | 0 | 2 | 3 | 8 | |
| 5 | Tortillano Tumasis (PHI) | Bye | 4 | 4 | | 8 | |
