= Wrestling at the 1956 Summer Olympics – Men's Greco-Roman light heavyweight =

Wrestling at the Olympics

Men's light heavyweight Greco-Roman wrestling at the Games of the XVI Olympiad
- Venue: Royal Exhibition Building
- Dates: December 3–6, 1956
- Competitors: 10 from 10 nations

Medalists
1st place, gold medalist(s)		Valentin Nikolayev	Soviet Union
2nd place, silver medalist(s)		Petko Sirakov	Bulgaria
3rd place, bronze medalist(s)		Karl-Erik Nilsson	Sweden

The men's Greco-Roman light heavyweight was a Greco-Roman wrestling event held as part of the Wrestling at the 1956 Summer Olympics programme. It was the tenth appearance of the event. Light heavyweight was the second-heaviest category, including wrestlers weighing 79 to 87 kilograms (174.2 to 191.8 lb).

== Competition format ==
This Greco-Roman wrestling competition continued to use the "bad points" elimination system introduced at the 1928 Summer Olympics for Greco-Roman and at the 1932 Summer Olympics for freestyle wrestling, as modified in 1952 (adding medal rounds and making all losses worth 3 points—from 1936 to 1948 losses by split decision only cost 2). Each round featured all wrestlers pairing off and wrestling one bout (with one wrestler having a bye if there were an odd number). The loser received 3 points. The winner received 1 point if the win was by decision and 0 points if the win was by fall. At the end of each round, any wrestler with at least 5 points was eliminated. This elimination continued until the medal rounds, which began when 3 wrestlers remained. These 3 wrestlers each faced each other in a round-robin medal round (with earlier results counting, if any had wrestled another before); record within the medal round determined medals, with bad points breaking ties.

== Results ==
Source: Official results

=== Round 1 ===
Bouts

Winner	Nation	Victory Type	Loser	Nation
Adil Atan	Turkey	Decision, 2–1	Gyula Kovács	Hungary
Valentin Nikolayev	Soviet Union	Decision, 3–0	Petko Sirakov	Bulgaria
Dale O. Thomas	United States	Fall	Eugen Wiesberger Jr.	Austria
Karl-Erik Nilsson	Sweden	Decision, 3–0	Veikko Lahti	Finland
Bob Steckle	Canada	Decision, 2–1	Victor Mucha	Australia

Points

Rank	Wrestler	Nation	Start	Earned	Total
1	Dale O. Thomas	United States	0	0	0
2	Adil Atan	Turkey	0	1	1
2	Valentin Nikolayev	Soviet Union	0	1	1
2	Karl-Erik Nilsson	Sweden	0	1	1
2	Bob Steckle	Canada	0	1	1
6	Gyula Kovács	Hungary	0	3	3
6	Veikko Lahti	Finland	0	3	3
6	Victor Mucha	Australia	0	3	3
6	Petko Sirakov	Bulgaria	0	3	3
6	Eugen Wiesberger Jr.	Austria	0	3	3

=== Round 2 ===
Atan withdrew due to injury after his bout.

Bouts

Winner	Nation	Victory Type	Loser	Nation
Petko Sirakov	Bulgaria	Decision, 2–1	Adil Atan	Turkey
Valentin Nikolayev	Soviet Union	Decision, 3–0	Gyula Kovács	Hungary
Veikko Lahti	Finland	Fall	Dale O. Thomas	United States
Eugen Wiesberger Jr.	Austria	Fall	Victor Mucha	Australia
Karl-Erik Nilsson	Sweden	Fall	Bob Steckle	Canada

Points

Rank	Wrestler	Nation	Start	Earned	Total
1	Karl-Erik Nilsson	Sweden	1	0	1
2	Valentin Nikolayev	Soviet Union	1	1	2
3	Veikko Lahti	Finland	3	0	3
3	Dale O. Thomas	United States	0	3	3
3	Eugen Wiesberger Jr.	Austria	3	0	3
6	Petko Sirakov	Bulgaria	3	1	4
6	Bob Steckle	Canada	1	3	4
8	Adil Atan	Turkey	1	3	4*
9	Gyula Kovács	Hungary	3	3	6
9	Victor Mucha	Australia	3	3	6

=== Round 3 ===
Bouts

Winner	Nation	Victory Type	Loser	Nation
Petko Sirakov	Bulgaria	Fall	Dale O. Thomas	United States
Valentin Nikolayev	Soviet Union	Decision, 3–0	Veikko Lahti	Finland
Karl-Erik Nilsson	Sweden	Decision, 3–0	Eugen Wiesberger Jr.	Austria
Bob Steckle	Canada	Bye	N/A	N/A

Points

Rank	Wrestler	Nation	Start	Earned	Total
1	Karl-Erik Nilsson	Sweden	1	1	2
2	Valentin Nikolayev	Soviet Union	2	1	3
3	Petko Sirakov	Bulgaria	4	0	4
3	Bob Steckle	Canada	4	0	4
5	Dale O. Thomas	United States	3	3	6
6	Eugen Wiesberger Jr.	Austria	3	3	6
7	Veikko Lahti	Finland	3	3	6

=== Round 4 ===
Bouts

Winner	Nation	Victory Type	Loser	Nation
Petko Sirakov	Bulgaria	Fall	Bob Steckle	Canada
Valentin Nikolayev	Soviet Union	Decision, 3–0	Karl-Erik Nilsson	Sweden

Points

Rank	Wrestler	Nation	Start	Earned	Total
1	Valentin Nikolayev	Soviet Union	3	1	4
1	Petko Sirakov	Bulgaria	4	0	4
3	Karl-Erik Nilsson	Sweden	2	3	5
4	Bob Steckle	Canada	4	3	7

=== Medal rounds ===
Nikolayev's victories over Sirakov in round 1 and over Nilsson in round 4 counted for the medal round, giving him the gold medal at 2–0 against the other medalists. Sirakov defeated Nilsson in a de facto silver medal bout.

Bouts

Winner	Nation	Victory Type	Loser	Nation
Petko Sirakov	Bulgaria	Decision, 3–0	Karl-Erik Nilsson	Sweden

Points

Rank	Wrestler	Nation	Wins	Losses
1st place, gold medalist(s)	Valentin Nikolayev	Soviet Union	2	0
2nd place, silver medalist(s)	Petko Sirakov	Bulgaria	1	1
3rd place, bronze medalist(s)	Karl-Erik Nilsson	Sweden	0	2
