= Wrestling at the 1956 Summer Olympics – Men's Greco-Roman bantamweight =

Wrestling at the Olympics

Men's Greco-Roman bantamweight at the Games of the XVI Olympiad
- Venue: Royal Exhibition Building
- Dates: 3–6 December 1956
- Competitors: 13 from 13 nations

Medalists
1st place, gold medalist(s)		Konstantin Vyrupayev	Soviet Union
2nd place, silver medalist(s)		Edvin Vesterby	Sweden
3rd place, bronze medalist(s)		Francisc Horvath	Romania

The men's Greco-Roman bantamweight competition at the 1956 Summer Olympics in Melbourne took place from 3 December to 6 December at the Royal Exhibition Building. Nations were limited to one competitor. Bantamweight was the second-lightest category, including wrestlers weighing 52 to 57 kilograms (114.6 to 125.7 lb).

== Competition format ==
This Greco-Roman wrestling competition continued to use the "bad points" elimination system introduced at the 1928 Summer Olympics for Greco-Roman and at the 1932 Summer Olympics for freestyle wrestling, as modified in 1952 (adding medal rounds and making all losses worth 3 points—from 1936 to 1948 losses by split decision only cost 2). Each round featured all wrestlers pairing off and wrestling one bout (with one wrestler having a bye if there were an odd number). The loser received 3 points. The winner received 1 point if the win was by decision and 0 points if the win was by fall. At the end of each round, any wrestler with at least 5 points was eliminated. This elimination continued until the medal rounds, which began when 3 wrestlers remained. These 3 wrestlers each faced each other in a round-robin medal round (with earlier results counting, if any had wrestled another before); record within the medal round determined medals, with bad points breaking ties.

== Results ==
=== Round 1 ===
Bouts

Winner	Nation	Victory Type	Loser	Nation
Imre Hódos	Hungary	Decision, 3–0	Reijo Nykänen	Finland
Adolfo Díaz	Argentina	Fall	Joe Sweeney	Australia
Francisc Horvath	Romania	Decision, 2–1	Konstantin Vyrupayev	Soviet Union
Yaşar Yılmaz	Turkey	Decision, 3–0	Omer Vercouteren	Belgium
Dinko Petrov	Bulgaria	Decision, 2–1	Edvin Vesterby	Sweden
Fred Kämmerer	United Team of Germany	Decision, 2–1	Franz Brunner	Austria
Kent Townley	United States	Bye	N/A	N/A

Points

Rank	Wrestler	Nation	Start	Earned	Total
1	Adolfo Díaz	Argentina	0	0	0
1	Kent Townley	United States	0	0	0
3	Imre Hódos	Hungary	0	1	1
3	Francisc Horvath	Romania	0	1	1
3	Fred Kämmerer	United Team of Germany	0	1	1
3	Dinko Petrov	Bulgaria	0	1	1
3	Yaşar Yılmaz	Turkey	0	1	1
8	Franz Brunner	Austria	0	3	3
8	Reijo Nykänen	Finland	0	3	3
8	Joe Sweeney	Australia	0	3	3
8	Omer Vercouteren	Belgium	0	3	3
8	Edvin Vesterby	Sweden	0	3	3
8	Konstantin Vyrupayev	Soviet Union	0	3	3

=== Round 2 ===
Bouts

Winner	Nation	Victory Type	Loser	Nation
Imre Hódos	Hungary	Decision, 3–0	Kent Townley	United States
Reijo Nykänen	Finland	Decision, 2–1	Adolfo Díaz	Argentina
Francisc Horvath	Romania	Decision, 3–0	Joe Sweeney	Australia
Konstantin Vyrupayev	Soviet Union	Decision, 3–0	Yaşar Yılmaz	Turkey
Dinko Petrov	Bulgaria	Decision, 3–0	Omer Vercouteren	Belgium
Edvin Vesterby	Sweden	Decision, 3–0	Franz Brunner	Austria
Fred Kämmerer	United Team of Germany	Bye	N/A	N/A

Points

Rank	Wrestler	Nation	Start	Earned	Total
1	Fred Kämmerer	United Team of Germany	1	0	1
2	Imre Hódos	Hungary	1	1	2
2	Francisc Horvath	Romania	1	1	2
2	Dinko Petrov	Bulgaria	1	1	2
5	Adolfo Díaz	Argentina	0	3	3
5	Kent Townley	United States	0	3	3
7	Edvin Vesterby	Sweden	3	1	4
7	Konstantin Vyrupayev	Soviet Union	3	1	4
7	Reijo Nykänen	Finland	3	1	4
7	Yaşar Yılmaz	Turkey	1	3	4
11	Franz Brunner	Austria	3	3	6
11	Joe Sweeney	Australia	3	3	6
11	Omer Vercouteren	Belgium	3	3	6

=== Round 3 ===
Bouts

Winner	Nation	Victory Type	Loser	Nation
Fred Kämmerer	United Team of Germany	Decision, 3–0	Kent Townley	United States
Imre Hódos	Hungary	Fall	Adolfo Díaz	Argentina
Francisc Horvath	Romania	Decision, 2–1	Reijo Nykänen	Finland
Konstantin Vyrupayev	Soviet Union	Fall	Dinko Petrov	Bulgaria
Edvin Vesterby	Sweden	Walkover	Yaşar Yılmaz	Turkey

Points

Rank	Wrestler	Nation	Start	Earned	Total
1	Imre Hódos	Hungary	2	0	2
1	Fred Kämmerer	United Team of Germany	1	1	2
3	Francisc Horvath	Romania	2	1	3
4	Edvin Vesterby	Sweden	4	0	4
4	Konstantin Vyrupayev	Soviet Union	4	0	4
6	Dinko Petrov	Bulgaria	2	3	5
7	Adolfo Díaz	Argentina	3	3	6
8	Kent Townley	United States	3	3	6
9	Reijo Nykänen	Finland	4	3	7
9	Yaşar Yılmaz	Turkey	4	3	7

=== Round 4 ===
Vyrupayev had defeated Hódos; Kammerer had a bye while neither of the other two wrestlers tied at 5 points had one.

Bouts

Winner	Nation	Victory Type	Loser	Nation
Francisc Horvath	Romania	Decision, 3–0	Fred Kämmerer	United Team of Germany
Konstantin Vyrupayev	Soviet Union	Decision, 3–0	Imre Hódos	Hungary
Edvin Vesterby	Sweden	Bye	N/A	N/A

Points

Rank	Wrestler	Nation	Start	Earned	Total
1	Edvin Vesterby	Sweden	4	0	4
1	Francisc Horvath	Romania	3	1	4
3	Konstantin Vyrupayev	Soviet Union	4	1	5
4	Imre Hódos	Hungary	2	3	5
5	Fred Kämmerer	United Team of Germany	2	3	5

=== Medal rounds ===
Horvath's victory over Vyrupayev in round 1 counted for the medal rounds. The three medalists all finished 1–1 against each other. Vyrupayev had the best result within the group, with his win coming by unanimous decision as opposed to the split-decision wins of the other two medalists; he took gold. Of the two remaining wrestlers, Vesterby had defeated Horvath head-to-head and took silver. Horvath earned bronze.

Bouts

Winner	Nation	Victory Type	Loser	Nation
Edvin Vesterby	Sweden	Decision, 2–1	Francisc Horvath	Romania
Konstantin Vyrupayev	Soviet Union	Decision, 3–0	Edvin Vesterby	Sweden

Points

Rank	Wrestler	Nation	Wins	Losses	Points
1st place, gold medalist(s)	Konstantin Vyrupayev	Soviet Union	1	1	4
2nd place, silver medalist(s)	Edvin Vesterby	Sweden	1	1	4
3rd place, bronze medalist(s)	Francisc Horvath	Romania	1	1	4
