= John Dodd (wrestler) =

Welsh wrestler

Personal information
- Nationality: British (Welsh)
- Born: 3 December 1929
- Died: 23 October 2006 (aged 76) Kings Lynn, Norfolk, England

Sport
- Sport: Wrestling
- Event: Light-heavyweight
- Club: Northwood

John Bolas Dodd (3 December 1929 – 23 October 2006) was a wrestler who competed for Wales at the British Empire and Commonwealth Games (now Commonwealth Games).

== Biography ==
Dodd resided in Nottingham and was a semi-finalist during the 1957 and 1958 Southern Area Championships. In February 1958 he won the London Open heavyweight title.

He was a member of the Northwood Club and with no Welsh Wrestling Association in existence at the time, he was selected for the Empire Games team following trials in London, organised by the British Amateur Wrestling Association on 31 May 1958.

He represented the 1958 Welsh team at the 1958 British Empire and Commonwealth Games in Cardiff, Wales, in the lLight-heavyweight division of the wrestling competition, finishing x behind Jan Theron of South Africa.
