= Karl-Erik Nilsson =

Karl-Erik Nilsson may refer to:

- Karl-Erik Nilsson (wrestler) (1922–2017), Swedish wrestler
- Karl-Erik Nilsson (referee) (born 1957), retired football (soccer) referee from Sweden
- Karl-Erik Nilsson (footballer), Swedish footballer
