= Angus McRitchie =

Scottish wrestler

Personal information
- Nationality: British (Scottish)

Sport
- Sport: Wrestling
- Event: Light-heavyweight
- Club: Glasgow Police

Angus McRitchie is a former Scottish wrestler who competed at the British Empire and Commonwealth Games (now Commonwealth Games).

== Biography ==
McRitchie was a member of the Glasgow Police wrestling team and was a Scottish international wrestler.

He participated in the 1957 Scottish championships before being selected for the 1958 Scottish team for the 1958 British Empire and Commonwealth Games in Cardiff, Wales, where he competed in the 90kg light-heavyweight event finishing sixth behind gold medallist Jan Theron of South Africa.
