= Alastair Duncan (wrestler) =

Scottish wrestler

Personal information
- Nationality: British (Scottish)

Sport
- Sport: Wrestling
- Event: Lightweight
- Club: Glasgow
Medal record
Men's freestyle wrestling
Representing Scotland
Commonwealth Games
Silver medal – second place	1958 Cardiff	Lightweight

Alastair Duncan is a former Scottish wrestler who won a silver medal at the Commonwealth Games.

== Biography ==
Duncan was a member of the North British Locomotive Company club in the Springburn district of Glasgow and in 1956 represented Scotland at international level, competing against England in the Federation Trophy. In 1957, he reached the British lightweight final but lost to George McKenzie.

He was selected for the 1958 Scottish team for the 1958 British Empire and Commonwealth Games in Cardiff, Wales, where he competed in the 68kg lightweight event and won the silver medal.
