= Weightlifting at the 1956 Summer Olympics – Men's 56 kg =

Weightlifting at the Olympics

Men's 56 kg at the Games of the XVI Olympiad
- Venue: Royal Exhibition Building
- Date: 23 November 1956
- Competitors: 16 from 13 nations
- Winning total: 342.5 kg WR

Medalists
1st place, gold medalist(s)		Charles Vinci	United States
2nd place, silver medalist(s)		Vladimir Stogov	Soviet Union
3rd place, bronze medalist(s)		Mahmoud Namjoo	Iran

The men's 56 kg weightlifting competitions at the 1956 Summer Olympics in Melbourne took place on 23 November at the Royal Exhibition Building. It was the third appearance of the bantamweight class.

Each weightlifter had three attempts at each of the three lifts. The best score for each lift was summed to give a total. The weightlifter could increase the weight between attempts (minimum of 5 kg between first and second attempts, 2.5 kg between second and third attempts) but could not decrease weight. If two or more weightlifters finished with the same total, the competitors' body weights were used as the tie-breaker (lighter athlete wins).

== Records ==
Prior to this competition, the existing world and Olympic records were as follows.

World record	Press	Vladimir Stogov (URS)	107.5 kg		1956
World record	Snatch	Charles Vinci (USA)	102.5 kg	Munich, West Germany	12 October 1955
World record	Clean & Jerk	Chen Ching Kai (CHN)	133 kg		1956
World record	Total	Vladimir Stogov (URS)	335 kg	Munich, West Germany	12 October 1955
Olympic record	Press	Joseph De Pietro (USA)	105 kg	London, United Kingdom	9 August 1948
Olympic record	Snatch	Ivan Udodov (URS)	97.5 kg	Helsinki, Finland	25 July 1952
Olympic record	Clean & Jerk	Ivan Udodov (URS)	127.5 kg	Helsinki, Finland	25 July 1952
Olympic record	Total	Ivan Udodov (URS)	315 kg	Helsinki, Finland	25 July 1952

== Results ==
Rank	Athlete	Nation	Body weight	Press (kg)				Snatch (kg)				Clean & Jerk (kg)				Total
Rank	Athlete	Nation	Body weight	1	2	3	Result	1	2	3	Result	1	2	3	Result	Total
1st place, gold medalist(s)	Charles Vinci	United States	56.00	100	~~105~~	105	105 =OR	100	105	~~107.5~~	105 OR	127.5	132.5	~~135~~	132.5	342.5 WR
2nd place, silver medalist(s)	Vladimir Stogov	Soviet Union	56.00	100	105	~~107.5~~	105 =OR	97.5	102.5	105	105 OR	127.5	~~132.5~~	~~132.5~~	127.5	337.5
3rd place, bronze medalist(s)	Mahmoud Namjoo	Iran	56.00	95	100	~~105~~	100	95	100	102.5	102.5	125	~~130~~	130	130	332.5
4	Yu In-ho	South Korea	55.70	82.5	87.5	90	90	90	~~95~~	95	95	130	135	~~140~~	135 WR	320
5	Kim Hae-nam	South Korea	55.70	85	~~90~~	~~90~~	85	95	~~100~~	~~100~~	95	120	125	127.5	127.5	307.5
6	Yoshio Nanbu	Japan	55.60	~~82.5~~	82.5	87.5	87.5	90	95	97.5	97.5	115	120	~~125~~	120	305
7	Reg Gaffley	South Africa	56.00	85	92.5	97.5	97.5	85	90	~~92.5~~	90	110	117.5	~~122.5~~	117.5	305
8	Yukio Furuyama	Japan	55.80	85	90	~~92.5~~	90	87.5	~~92.5~~	~~92.5~~	87.5	115	120	125	125	302.5
9	Song Re-nado	Republic of China	55.10	~~85~~	85	~~90~~	85	77.5	82.5	85	85	105	112.5	117.5	117.5	287.5
10	Gaston Gaffney	South Africa	55.70	82.5	87.5	~~92.5~~	87.5	80	85	~~87.5~~	85	112.5	~~117.5~~	~~117.5~~	112.5	285
11	Aw Chu Kee	Burma	56.00	~~85~~	~~85~~	85	85	80	~~85~~	~~85~~	80	~~110~~	110	~~115~~	110	275
12	Valli Asari Mookan	India	55.00	72.5	80	~~82.5~~	80	75	80	~~85~~	80	107.5	~~112.5~~	112.5	112.5	272.5
13	Charles Henderson	Australia	55.50	72.5	~~77.5~~	~~77.5~~	72.5	85	~~90~~	~~90~~	85	105	110	115	115	272.5
13	Michael Swain	Guyana	55.50	75	80	~~82.5~~	80	82.5	~~87.5~~	~~87.5~~	82.5	110	~~115~~	~~115~~	110	272.5
15	Habib Rahman	Pakistan	55.70	75	80	~~82.5~~	80	~~72.5~~	~~72.5~~	~~75~~	–	90	95	97.5	97.5	177.5
16	Pedro Landero	Philippines	55.70	~~95~~	~~95~~	~~95~~	–	Retired								–

As weigh-in time approached, Vinci was one and a half pounds overweight. After an hour of running and sweating he was still seven ounces over the limit with 15 minutes to go. Fortunately, a severe last-minute haircut did the trick, and Vinci went on to win the gold medal.

== New records ==
Press	105 kg	Charles Vinci (USA); Vladimir Stogov (URS)	=OR
Snatch	105 kg	Charles Vinci (USA); Vladimir Stogov (URS)	OR
Clean & Jerk	135 kg	Yu In-ho (KOR)	OR
Total	342.5 kg	Charles Vinci (USA)	WR
