= Peter Blair =

Peter Blair may refer to:

- Peter Blair (wrestler) (1932–1994), American sport wrestler and naval officer
- Peter Hunter Blair (1912–1982), English academic and historian
