= Sid Griffiths =

Welsh wrestler

Personal information
- Nationality: British (Welsh)

Sport
- Sport: Wrestling
- Event: Flyweight
- Club: Stockport

Sid Griffiths is a former wrestler who competed for Wales at the British Empire and Commonwealth Games (now Commonwealth Games).

== Biography ==
Griffiths resided in Liverpool and was the Lancashire flyweight champion in 1953 and 1954, in addition to being the Northern Counties champion in 1953.

He was a member of the Stockport Club and with no Welsh Wrestling Association in existence at the time, he was selected for the Empire Games team following trials in London, organised by the British Amateur Wrestling Association on 31 May 1958.

He represented the 1958 Welsh team at the 1958 British Empire and Commonwealth Games in Cardiff, Wales, in the flyweight division of the wrestling competition, finishing fifth behind Ian Epton of South Africa.
