= 1955 World Wrestling Championships =

- Host city: Karlsruhe, West Germany
- Dates: 21–25 April 1955

Champions
- Greco-Roman: Soviet Union

The 1955 World Greco-Roman Wrestling Championships were held in Karlsruhe, West Germany from 21 to 25 April 1955.

== Medal table ==
Rank	Nation	Gold	Silver	Bronze	Total
1	Soviet Union	6	1	0	7
2	Hungary	1	1	0	2
3	Italy	1	0	1	2
4	Turkey	0	2	2	4
5	Finland	0	2	0	2
6	Sweden	0	1	3	4
7	West Germany	0	1	1	2
8	Yugoslavia	0	0	1	1
Totals (8 entries)		8	8	8	24

== Team ranking ==
Rank	Men's Greco-Roman	
Rank	Team	Points
1	Soviet Union	41
2	Sweden	23
3	Turkey	19
4	Finland	15
5	Italy	14
6	Hungary	13

== Medal summary ==
Event	Gold	Silver	Bronze
Flyweight; 52 kg	Ignazio Fabra; Italy	Nail Garaev; Soviet Union	Hüseyin Akbaş; Turkey
Bantamweight; 57 kg	Vladimir Stashkevich; Soviet Union	Yaşar Yılmaz; Turkey	Pietro Lombardi; Italy
Featherweight; 62 kg	Imre Polyák; Hungary	Müzahir Sille; Turkey	Gunnar Håkansson; Sweden
Lightweight; 67 kg	Grigory Gamarnik; Soviet Union	Kyösti Lehtonen; Finland	Gustav Freij; Sweden
Welterweight; 73 kg	Vladimir Maneev; Soviet Union	Anton Mackowiak; West Germany	Milorad Arsić; Yugoslavia
Middleweight; 79 kg	Givi Kartozia; Soviet Union	György Gurics; Hungary	Horst Heß; West Germany
Light heavyweight 87 kg	Valentin Nikolayev; Soviet Union	Veikko Lahti; Finland	Karl-Erik Nilsson; Sweden
Heavyweight +87 kg	Aleksandr Mazur; Soviet Union	Bertil Antonsson; Sweden	Hamit Kaplan; Turkey
