= Jock Bews =

Scottish wrestler

Personal information
- Nationality: British (Scottish)
- Born: 13 July 1921 Edinburgh, Scotland
- Died: 22 August 2015 (aged 94) Edinburgh, Scotland

Sport
- Sport: Wrestling
- Event: Flyweight
- Club: Milton AWC, Edinburgh

John Bee Bews (13 July 1921 – 22 August 2015) was a Scottish wrestler who competed at the British Empire and Commonwealth Games (now Commonwealth Games).

== Biography ==
Bews was a member of the Milton Amateur Wrestling Club in Edinburgh and in 1958 was the Scottish flyweight champion.

He was selected for the 1958 Scottish team for the 1958 British Empire and Commonwealth Games in Cardiff, Wales, where he competed in the 52kg flyweight event finishing fifth behind gold medallist Ian Epton of South Africa.

He went by the nickname Lionheart.

Bews was the 1959 British champion at the British Wrestling Championships and was still competing at the highest level in 1962 but failed to make the weight at the 1962 Scottish championships.
