= Konstantin Vyrupaev =

Soviet wrestler (1930–2012)

Medal record

Representing the Soviet Union

Men's Greco-Roman wrestling

Olympic Games
Gold medal – first place	1956 Melbourne	Bantamweight
Bronze medal – third place	1960 Rome	Featherweight

Konstantin Vyrupaev (2 October 1930 – 31 October 2012) was a Soviet wrestler and Olympic champion.

He competed at the 1956 Summer Olympics in Melbourne where he won a gold medal in Greco-Roman wrestling, the bantamweight class. At the 1960 Summer Olympics in Rome he won a bronze medal in the featherweight class.
