= Renado Song =

Taiwanese weightlifter

Personal information
- Born: 4 October 1934 (age 90)

Sport
- Sport: Weightlifting

Renado Song (Chinese: 宋德良; pinyin: Sòng Déliáng, born 4 October 1934) is a Chinese Filipino weightlifter who represented the Republic of China (i.e. Taiwan) in the men's bantamweight event at the 1956 Summer Olympics.
