= John Allison (wrestler) =

Scottish wrestler

Personal information
- Nationality: British (Scottish)

Sport
- Sport: Wrestling
- Event: Middleweight/Welterweight
- Club: L.M.S. Rovers Club, Glasgow

John Allison is a former Scottish wrestler who appeared at the Commonwealth Games and was a six times champion of Scotland.

== Biography ==
Allison was a member of the L.M.S. Rovers Club of Glasgow and successfully defended his Scottish Amateur Championship of Scotland in January 1952. During March 1954 he secured a fourth consecutive middleweight championship of Scotland and was one of three wrestling representatives for the Scottish team at the 1954 British Empire and Commonwealth Games in Vancouver, Canada, where he participated in the welterweight 74kg event.

Allison was finally beaten in the Scottish Championships by George McKenzie in 1957, ending a run of six consecutive titles. McKenzie was subsequently selected for the 1958 British Empire and Commonwealth Games instead of Allison.
