= Yoshio Nanbu =

Japanese weightlifter (born 1933)

Personal information
- Nationality: Japanese
- Born: 22 March 1933 (age 92)

Sport
- Sport: Weightlifting

Yoshio Nanbu (born 22 March 1933) is a Japanese weightlifter. He competed in the men's bantamweight event at the 1956 Summer Olympics.
