= Tony Scott (wrestler) =

Welsh wrestler

Personal information
- Nationality: British (Welsh)
- Born: 15 July 1935 Pontypridd, Rhondda, Wales
- Died: 13 February 2015 (aged 79) Florida, United States

Sport
- Sport: Wrestling
- Event: Welterweight
- Club: Bristol WC

Anthony Charles Scott (15 July 1935 – 13 February 2015) was a wrestler who competed for Wales at the British Empire and Commonwealth Games (now Commonwealth Games).

== Biography ==
Scott, originally from Rhondda, was the 1954 champion and 1956 runner-up of the Eastern Midland and Western welterweight championships. He was a member of the Bristol Wrestling Club.

An electrician at the time, Scott wrestled in England and with no Welsh Wrestling Association in existence at the time, he was selected for the Empire Games team following trials in London, organised by the British Amateur Wrestling Association on 31 May 1958.

Scott represented the 1958 Welsh team at the 1958 British Empire and Commonwealth Games in Cardiff, Wales, in the welterweight division of the wrestling competition, finishing seventh behind Muhammad Bashir of Pakistan.
