= Reg Yates (wrestler) =

Welsh wrestler (born 1929)

Personal information
- Nationality: British (Welsh)
- Born: c. 1929 Tredegar, Wales

Sport
- Sport: Wrestling
- Event: Lightweight
- Club: Birmingham Athletic Institute AWC

Reginald D. Yates (born c. 1929) was a wrestler who competed for Wales at the British Empire and Commonwealth Games (now Commonwealth Games).

== Biography ==
Yates originally from Tredegar, was a member of the Birmingham Athletic Institute Amateur Wrestling Club and was the 1958 Midlands championship runner-up.

With no Welsh Wrestling Association in existence at the time, he was selected for the Empire Games team following trials in London, organised by the British Amateur Wrestling Association on 31 May 1958.

He represented the 1958 Welsh team at the 1958 British Empire and Commonwealth Games in Cardiff, Wales, in the lightweight division of the wrestling competition, finishing sixth behind Muhammad Ashraf of Pakistan.

During the early 1960s, Yates turned professional and was a regular on television and was wrestling out of Castle Bromwich.
