= Valli Asari Mookan =

Indian weightlifter (born 1931)

Personal information
- Nationality: Indian
- Born: 1931 (age 94–95)

Sport
- Sport: Weightlifting

Valli Asari Mookan (born 1931) is an Indian weightlifter. He competed in the men's bantamweight event at the 1956 Summer Olympics.
