= Peter Isbester =

British athlete

Personal information
- Nationality: British (English/Scottish)
- Born: 1935 Ilford, London, England

Sport
- Sport: Athletics
- Event: Discus throw
- Club: Ilford AC; Oxford University AC

Peter Isbester (born 1935) is an English-born former track and field athlete who competed for Scotland at the 1958 British Empire and Commonwealth Games (now Commonwealth Games).

== Biography ==
Isbester was born in Ilford, London to Scottish parents, and was a member of the Ilford Athletic Club.

He was educated at Wanstead Grammar School and studied at Trinity College, Oxford and was a member of the University of Oxford athletics club. At the 1957 AAA Championships he finished third to fellow Scot Mike Lindsay.

He represented the Scottish Empire and Commonwealth Games team at the 1958 British Empire Games in Cardiff, Wales, participating in one event, the discus throw.
