= Gerry Martina =

Irish wrestler (1928–1990)

Personal information
- Nationality: Irish
- Born: 5 February 1928 Dublin, Ireland
- Died: 3 April 1990 (aged 62) Dublin, Ireland
- Height: 180 cm (5 ft 11 in)
- Weight: 86 kg (190 lb)

Sport
- Sport: Amateur wrestling

Gerald "Gerry" A. J. Martina (5 February 1928 – 3 April 1990) was an Irish amateur wrestler who competed at the 1956 Summer Olympics and the 1960 Summer Olympics.

== Biography ==
Martina was a rugby player before competing in wrestling. He trained Drogheda United in the 1950s and the League of Ireland XI team in the 1960s.

At the 1956 Olympic Games in Melbourne, Australia, he participated in the men's light-heavyweight freestyle category, finishing a notable 4th. Four years later at the 1960 Olympic Games in Rome, he wrestled at light-heavyweight again.

Martina was the British champion after winning the 1956 light-heavyweight title at the British Wrestling Championships.

After competing in the Olympics, he was a masseur for Ireland's football team.

== Sources ==
- DUFC A Claret and Blue History by Brian Whelan (2010)
