= Victor Mucha =

Australian wrestler

Personal information
- Full name: Vitezslav Mucha
- Nationality: Australian
- Born: 26 January 1921 Ostrava, Czechoslovakia
- Died: 2 August 1982 (aged 61) near Albury, New South Wales, Australia

Sport
- Sport: Wrestling

Vitezslav "Victor" Mucha (26 January 1921 – 2 August 1982) was an Australian wrestler. He competed in the men's Greco-Roman light heavyweight at the 1956 Summer Olympics.
