= Reijo Nykänen =

Finnish wrestler (1930–2019)

Personal information
- Nationality: Finnish
- Born: 30 June 1930 Joroinen, Finland
- Died: 23 January 2019 (aged 88)

Sport
- Sport: Wrestling

Reijo Nykänen (30 June 1930 – 23 January 2019) was a Finnish wrestler. He competed in the men's Greco-Roman bantamweight at the 1956 Summer Olympics.
