= Nejdet Zalev =

Bulgarian wrestler (1937–2011)

Medal record

Men's freestyle wrestling

Representing Bulgaria

Olympic Games
Bronze medal – third place	1960 Rome	Bantamweight

Nejdet Zalev (Bulgarian: Неждет Залев, 13 July 1937 – 19 May 2011) was an Olympic medalist in wrestling from the township of Ustina in south-central Bulgaria. He won the Silver Medal in freestyle wrestling (bantamweight) in the 1960 Summer Olympics in Rome.
