= Geoffrey Bailey (wrestler) =

Welsh wrestler

Personal information
- Nationality: British (Welsh)

Sport
- Sport: Wrestling
- Event: Middleweight
- Club: Swansea WC

Geoffrey Bailey was a wrestler who competed for Wales at the British Empire and Commonwealth Games (now Commonwealth Games).

== Biography ==
Bailey, originally from Swansea, was the runner-up in both the middleweight and light-heavyweight at the 1952 and 1954 championships of Yorkshire. Additionally he was the heavyweight runner-up in the 1954 Northern Counties championships and took third place in the 1957 East Midlands championships.

He was a member of the Swansea Wrestling Club but with no Welsh Wrestling Association in existence at the time, he was selected for the Empire Games team following trials in London, organised by the British Amateur Wrestling Association on 31 May 1958.

He represented the 1958 Welsh team at the 1958 British Empire and Commonwealth Games in Cardiff, Wales, in the middleweight division of the wrestling competition, finishing sixth behind Manie van Zyl of South Africa.
