= Tadeusz Trojanowski =

Polish wrestler (1933–1997)

Medal record

Men's freestyle wrestling

Representing Poland

Olympic Games
Bronze medal – third place	1960 Rome	Bantamweight

Tadeusz Hipolit Trojanowski (born 1 January 1933 in Straszów – 10 February 1997 in Warsaw) was a Polish wrestler who competed in the 1960 Summer Olympics.

Bronze medalist at the 1960 Summer Olympics in wrestling in 57 kg category (bantamweight).
