= Norayr Musheghyan =

Armenian wrestler (1935–2011)

Personal information
- Born: 2 November 1935 Yerevan, Armenian SSR Transcaucasian SFSR, Soviet Union
- Died: 23 December 2011 (aged 76) Yerevan, Armenia
- Weight: 62 kg (137 lb)

Sport
- Sport: Wrestling
- Event: Freestyle
- Coached by: Artashes Nazaryan
Medal record
Men's freestyle wrestling
Representing Soviet Union
World Championships
Bronze medal – third place	1957 Istanbul	62 kg
World Cup
Gold medal – first place	1958 Sofia	62 kg

Norayr Musheghyan (Armenian: Նորայր Մուշեղյան; 2 November 1935 – 23 December 2011) was a Soviet and Armenian wrestler first World Champion of Armenia (freestyle) and coach.

== Biography ==
Norayr Musheghyan was born on 2 November 1935 in Yerevan to Armenian parents, survivors of Armenian genocide from Mush and Sebastia who arrived in Yerevan as orphan children. The first sport Musheghyan took up was gymnastics, but due to injury he was forced to abandon it. He began wrestling in 1952 under the coaching of Artashes Nazaryan. Initially, he could not choose between freestyle and Greco-Roman wrestling, but ultimately chose to specialize in freestyle wrestling. He graduated from the Armenian State Institute of Physical Culture and Sport in 1957.

By the end of the 1950s, Musheghyan was one of the top featherweight wrestlers not only in the Soviet Union, but also in the world. In 1958 and 1959 he won the USSR Championships, became a bronze medalist at the 1957 World Wrestling Championships, and won the gold medal at the 1958 Wrestling World Cup. Musheghyan was the first Armenian freestyle wrestler to win a World Championship medal and win the World Cup. At the USSR Second Spartakiad in 1959, he came in first place. However, in spite of these successes the USSR national team coaching staff did not select him to partake at the 1960 Summer Olympics in Rome, after which Musheghyan retired from wrestling. He received the Deserved master of sports of the USSR title in 1966.

He was the founder of the Freestyle wrestling school of Yerevan in 1966. From 1971 to 1977 he worked in Afghanistan and Madagascar, after which he returned to coaching in Yerevan and participated in the organization of several tournaments in wrestling. Musheghyan was also known in Armenia as an active public figure and founder of the "Zoravar Andranik" All-Armenian Union in 1986.

He died on 23 December 2011, aged 76, in his home city of Yerevan.
