= Malcolm Pemberton =

Welsh athlete

Personal information
- Nationality: British (Welsh)
- Born: 15 March 1937 Newport, Wales
- Died: August 1993 Stevenage, England

Sport
- Sport: Athletics
- Event: Discus throw
- Club: Birmingham Univ AC; Newport Harriers

Malcolm Wilmot Pemberton (15 March 1937 – August 1993) was a track and field athlete from Wales, who competed at the 1958 British Empire and Commonwealth Games (now Commonwealth Games).

== Biography ==
Pemberton studied at the University of Birmingham and represented their athletics team, he was also a member of the Newport Harriers.

In June 1958 he represented South Wales against North Wales in a warm up event before the Empire Games, finishing runner-up behind Hywel Williams in the discus throw event. The same outcome arrived at the 1958 AAA Welsh championships, with Pemberton again second behind Williams.

He represented the 1958 Welsh team at the 1958 British Empire and Commonwealth Games in Cardiff, Wales, where he participated in one event; the discus throw.

Pemberton also played rugby union at junior level and toured South Africa with the Welsh Secondary Schools.
