= Ernesto Ramel =

Filipino wrestler (born 1934)

Personal information
- Nationality: Filipino
- Born: 4 January 1934 (age 92)

Sport
- Sport: Wrestling

Ernesto Taberna Ramel (born 4 January 1934) is a Filipino wrestler. He competed in the men's freestyle bantamweight at the 1956 Summer Olympics.
