= George Farquhar (wrestler) =

British wrestler (born 1929)

Personal information
- Nationality: British (Scottish)
- Born: 14 December 1929 (age 96) Edinburgh, Scotland

Sport
- Sport: Wrestling
- Event: Middleweight
- Club: Milton AWC, Edinburgh
Medal record
Men's freestyle wrestling
Representing Scotland
Commonwealth Games
Silver medal – second place	1958 Cardiff	Middleweight

George Hardy Farquhar (born 14 December 1929) is a British and Scottish former wrestler who competed at the 1956 Summer Olympics.

== Biography ==
Farquhar was one of three wrestling representatives for the Scottish team at the 1954 British Empire and Commonwealth Games in Vancouver, Canada, where he participated in the middleweight 82kg event.

At the 1956 Olympic Games in Melbourne, he participated in the men's freestyle middleweight category. A plumber by trade, he was informed that he had been selected for the Olympics while working on an Edinburgh rooftop.

In 1957 he defeated Jim Wilson of Dunfermline to win the Scottish light-heavyweight title and was subsequently selected by Scotland, with George McKenzie and weightlifter Phil Caira for the Festival of Youth in Moscow, a trip that saw the trio detained in Poland following visa issues.

The following year he was selected for the 1958 Scottish team for the 1958 British Empire and Commonwealth Games in Cardiff, Wales, in the middleweight class again and won a silver medal.

In 1962 Farquhar was selected for the Scottish Commonwealth's team for the third time, for the 1962 British Empire and Commonwealth Games in Perth, Australia, in the welterweight class. He finished in fourth place behind the gold medal winner Muhammad Bashir of Pakistan.

Farquhar was a five-times winner of the British Wrestling Championships in 1953, 1955, 1956, 1957 and 1963.
