= Reg Gaffley =

South African weightlifter (1927–2025)

Personal information
- Nationality: South African
- Born: 1 September 1927 Cape Town, South Africa
- Died: 1 August 2025 (aged 97) Cape Town, South Africa

Sport
- Sport: Weightlifting

Reginald James Gaffley (1 September 1927 – 1 August 2025) was a South African weightlifter. He competed in the men's bantamweight event at the 1956 Summer Olympics. Gaffley died in Cape Town on 1 August 2025, at the age of 97.
