= Eric Harvey (wrestler) =

Welsh wrestler

Personal information
- Nationality: British (Welsh)
- Born: c.1923

Sport
- Sport: Wrestling
- Event: Heavyweight
- Club: Ruislip Manor; Metropolitan Police

Eric Harvey (born c.1923) was a wrestler who competed for Wales at the British Empire and Commonwealth Games (now Commonwealth Games).

== Biography ==
Harvey, originally from Merthyr, was a member of the Metropolitan Police force and represented Lancashire at county level. He was catchweight champion from 1955 to 1957 and national police champion from 1955 and 1956. Additionally he was the British championships runner-up in 1954.

Harvey lived at Bideford Road in South Ruislip and was a member of the Ruislip Manor and Metropolitan Police wrestling clubs and with no Welsh Wrestling Association in existence at the time, he was selected for the Empire Games team following trials in London, organised by the British Amateur Wrestling Association on 31 May 1958.

He captained and represented the 1958 Welsh wrestling team at the 1958 British Empire and Commonwealth Games in Cardiff, Wales, in the heavyweight division of the wrestling competition, finishing sixth behind Lila Ram of India.

In 1960 he was an inspector and had won the Met Police heavyweight title for eight consecutive years.
