= Kent Townley =

American wrestler

Personal information
- Born: January 18, 1930 Sioux City, Iowa, U.S.
- Died: May 26, 2005 (aged 75) Lyons, Georgia, U.S.

Sport
- Country: United States
- Sport: Wrestling
- Event: Greco-Roman
- College team: Iowa State
- Team: USA
- Coached by: Harold Nichols

Kent Townley (January 18, 1930 – May 26, 2005) was an American wrestler. He competed in the men's Greco-Roman bantamweight at the 1956 Summer Olympics.
