= Din Zahur =

Pakistani wrestler (born 1933)

Personal information
- Nationality: Pakistani
- Born: 19 January 1933

Sport
- Sport: Wrestling

Din Zahur (born 19 January 1933) is a Pakistani wrestler. He competed in the men's freestyle bantamweight at the 1956 Summer Olympics, where he won one bout and lost two.
