= 1958 Wrestling World Cup =

- Host city: Sofia, Bulgaria
- Dates: 20–22 June

Champions
- Freestyle: 8

The 1958 Wrestling World Cup was held from June 20 to 22 in Sofia, Bulgaria. The second freestyle Wrestling World Cup drew 76 wrestlers from 14 countries. This was the second World Cup organized by FILA. As during the first edition in each weight category, a separate individual tournament was held, and the winning team was determined by the total number of the points gained by each of its participants. As during the previous edition, the winner of the World Cup was the USSR National Team, which scored 38 points. This time, Greco-Roman wrestling event has not been contested. Roger Coulon, President of the International Wrestling Federation, visited Bulgaria for the World Cup, he called the event "an example of sports organization."

== Final ranking ==
#	Team
1	Soviet Union
2	Turkey
3	People's Republic of Bulgaria
4	Iran
5	Italy
6	East Germany
7	Hungarian People's Republic
8	Polish People's Republic
9	Japan
10	Socialist Republic of Romania
11	West Germany

== Medal summary ==
Event	1st place	2nd place	3rd place
Flyweight; 52 kg	Georgy Sayadov; Soviet Union	Mohammad Ali Khojastehpour; Iran	Naydet Zalev; Bulgaria
Bantamweight; 57 kg	Hüseyin Akbaş; Turkey	Enyu Valchev; Bulgaria	Mikhail Shakhov; Soviet Union
Featherweight; 62 kg	Norayr Musheghyan; Soviet Union	Mustafa Dağıstanlı; Turkey	Stancho Kolev; Bulgaria
Lightweight; 67 kg	Vladimir Sinyavsky; Soviet Union	Musa Aliyev; Bulgaria	Gyula Tóth; Hungary
Welterweight; 73 kg	İsmail Ogan; Turkey	Jahanbakht Tofigh; Iran	Garibaldo Nizzola; Italy
Middleweight; 79 kg	Hasan Güngör; Turkey	Georgy Skhirtladze; Soviet Union	Lothar Lippa; East Germany
Light heavyweight 87 kg	Anatoly Albul; Soviet Union	Gholamreza Takhti; Iran	Ibrahim Karabacak; Turkey
Heavyweight +87 kg	Lyutvi Ahmedov; Bulgaria	Ottar Kandelaki; Soviet Union	Hamit Kaplan; Turkey

== Commemoration ==
Bulgarian painter Vesselin Tomov made designs for a series of commemorative postage stamps "1958 World Cup Wrestling Championship," which were published later that year by the Bulgarian Post Office.

== Sources ==
=== News ===
- "Two Russian wrestlers won four of eight titles in the World Cup team prize". Democrat and Chronicle. Rochester, New York. Associated Press. June 24, 1958. p. 18.
- "Russian Wrestlers Capture World Cup". The Daily Oklahoman. Associated Press. June 24, 1958. p. 37.
- "World Cup Wrestling". Singapore Standard. Vol. 8, no. 338. Reuters. 6 June 1958. p. 12.
- "An Example of Sports Organization". Bulgaria Today. 7. Sofia Press Agency: 61. 1958.
- "World's Strongest Wrestlers Compete". Bulgaria. State Printing House: 40, 123. 1958.
- "The Strongest Man in the World". Bulgaria Today. 9. Sofia Press Agency: 39. 1960.

=== Web ===
- World Cup, Freestyle Seniors, 1958-06-20 Sofia (BUL). Institut für Angewandte Trainingswissenschaft Ringen Datenbanken (Wrestling Database).
