= Dermot Dunne (wrestler) =

Irish wrestler (born 1943)

Personal information
- Nationality: Irish
- Born: 5 September 1943 (age 82) Dublin, Ireland

Sport
- Sport: Wrestling

Dermot Dunne (born 5 September 1943) is an Irish wrestler. He competed in the men's freestyle bantamweight at the 1960 Summer Olympics.
