= Robert Parsons (wrestler) =

Scottish wrestler

Personal information
- Nationality: British (Scottish)

Sport
- Sport: Wrestling
- Event: Featherweight
- Club: Milton AWC, Edinburgh

Robert Parsons is a former Scottish wrestler who competed at the British Empire and Commonwealth Games (now Commonwealth Games).

== Biography ==
Parsons was a member of the Milton Amateur Wrestling Club in Edinburgh. He was the 1956 and 1957 Scottish featherweight champion.

He was selected for the 1958 Scottish team for the 1958 British Empire and Commonwealth Games in Cardiff, Wales, where he competed in the 62kg featherweight event finishing fifth behind gold medallist Abraham Geldenhuys of South Africa.

He was nicknamed Canvas-Back.
