= Peter Christie (wrestler) =

British wrestler

Personal information
- Nationality: British (English)

Sport
- Sport: Wrestling
- Event: Flyweight
- Club: Sparta AWC, London

Peter R. Christie is a British former wrestler who competed at the Commonwealth Games.

== Biography ==
Christie was a member of the Sparta AWC of London and won the 1957 Southern Counties title. Shortly afterwards he was beaten in the final of the 1957 British flyweight championship, held at the Royal Albert Hall.

Christie represented the England team in the 52kg flyweight at the 1958 British Empire and Commonwealth Games in Cardiff, Wales.

Christie finished fourth in the weight category, just missing out on a medal.

He was the winner of the British Wrestling Championships in 1958.
