= Joe Sweeney (wrestler) =

Australian wrestler

Personal information
- Nationality: Australian
- Born: 16 February 1933
- Died: 18 January 2016 (aged 82)

Sport
- Sport: Wrestling

Joe Sweeney (16 February 1933 – 18 January 2016) was an Australian wrestler. He competed in the men's Greco-Roman bantamweight at the 1956 Summer Olympics.
