= Tarashkeswar Pandey =

Indian wrestler

Personal information
- Nationality: Indian
- Born: 1936 (age 89–90)

Sport
- Sport: Wrestling

Tarashkeswar Pandey (born 1936) is an Indian wrestler. He competed in the men's freestyle bantamweight at the 1956 Summer Olympics.
