= Francisc Horvath =

Romanian Greco-Roman wrestler

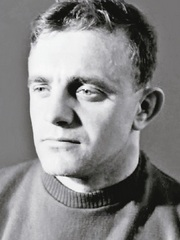

Personal information
- Born: 19 October 1928 (age 97) Lugoj, Romania

Sport
- Sport: Greco-Roman wrestling
- Club: Dinamo Bucuresti
Medal record
Representing Romania
Olympic Games
Bronze medal – third place	1956 Melbourne	57 kg
World Cup
Bronze medal – third place	1956 Istanbul	67 kg

Francisc Horvat (Hungarian: Ferenc Horváth; born 19 October 1928) is a retired Greco-Roman wrestler from Romania. He competed at the 1952 and 1956 Summer Olympics and won a bronze medal in 1956.
