= Phil Caira =

British weightlifter (1933–2003)

Personal information
- Born: 24 February 1933 Dunfermline, Scotland
- Died: 15 September 2003 (aged 70)

Sport
- Sport: Weightlifting
- Club: Phil Caira Physical School of Training, Kirkcaldy
- Coached by: Al Murray
Medal record
Representing Scotland
Commonwealth Games
Gold medal – first place	1958 Cardiff	light heavyweight
Gold medal – first place	1962 Perth	light heavyweight

Philip Mario Caira (24 February 1933 – 15 September 2003) is former weightlifter from Scotland, who competed at the 1956 Summer Olympics and the 1960 Summer Olympics and participated at five Commonwealth Games from 1954 to 1970.

== Biography ==
Caira represented the Scottish team at the 1954 British Empire and Commonwealth Games in Vancouver, Canada, where he participated in the light-heavyweight 82.5kg event.

In 1957 he was selected by Scotland, with wrestlers George Farquhar and George MacKenzie for the Festival of Youth in Moscow, a trip that saw the trio detained in Poland following visa issues.

He was selected for the 1958 Scottish team for the 1958 British Empire and Commonwealth Games in Cardiff, Wales, where he competed in the light-heavyweight event and won the gold medal.

Caira was now training out of and running his own facility called the Phil Caira Physical School of Training in Kirkcaldy. Four years later, he represented the 1962 Scottish Team for the third time at the Commonwealth Games. This time at the 1962 British Empire and Commonwealth Games in Perth, Australia, participating in the light-heavyweight event, and successfully defended his Commonwealth Games title by winning gold again.

A fourth Games appearance ensued when he represented the Scotland team at the 1966 British Empire and Commonwealth Games in Kingston, Jamaica, where he participated in 82.5kg light-heavyweight category.
