= Valentin Nikolayev (wrestler) =

Soviet wrestler (1924–2004)

Personal information
- Born: April 6, 1924 Dolyno-Kamyanka, Znamianka Raion, Yekaterinoslav Governorate, Ukrainian SSR, Soviet Union
- Died: October 31, 2004 (aged 80) Rostov-on-Don, Russia

Sport
- Sport: Greco-Roman wrestling
- Club: Lokomotiv Rostov
Medal record
Representing the Soviet Union
Olympic Games
Gold medal – first place	1956 Melbourne	87 kg
World Championships
Gold medal – first place	1955 Karlsruhe	87 kg

Valentin Vladimirovich Nikolayev (Russian: Валенти́н Влади́мирович Никола́ев, Ukrainian: Валенти́н Володи́мирович Нікола́єв; 6 April 1924 – 31 October 2004) was a Soviet Greco-Roman wrestler. He won the world title in 1955 and an Olympic gold medal in 1956. He also won gold medals at the World Festival of Youth and Students in 1951, 1953 and 1955. Domestically he held the Soviet light-heavyweight title in 1951 and 1954, placing second in 1953.

Nikolayev took up wrestling in 1945 and until 1956 competed as a light-heavyweight, before moving to a heavier class and winning three silver medals at the Soviet championships in 1957–59. He retired in 1960 and then had a long career as a coach in Rostov-on-Don, where he spent most of his life.

Nikolayev graduated from the Rostov Transport University. He was married to Nelli and had a daughter Stella and a son Vladimir.
