= Omer Vercouteren =

Belgian wrestler (1929–2014)

Personal information
- Nationality: Belgian
- Born: 28 November 1929 Burcht, Belgium
- Died: 13 July 2014 (aged 84)

Sport
- Sport: Wrestling

Omer Vercouteren (28 November 1929 – 13 July 2014) was a Belgian wrestler. He competed in the men's Greco-Roman bantamweight at the 1956 Summer Olympics. Vercouteren died on 13 July 2014, at the age of 84.
