= Gaston Gaffney =

South African weightlifter

Personal information
- Nationality: South African
- Born: 25 March 1928; Cape Town, South Africa
- Died: 7 January 1976 (aged 47)

Sport
- Sport: Weightlifting

Gaston Gaffney (25 March 1928 – 7 January 1976) was a South African weightlifter. He competed at the 1956 Summer Olympics and the 1960 Summer Olympics.
