= Tortillano Tumasis =

Filipino wrestler (born 1934)

Personal information
- Nationality: Filipino
- Born: 24 July 1934 (age 90); Iloilo City, Philippine Islands

Sport
- Sport: Wrestling

Tortillano T. Tumasis (born 24 July 1934) is a Filipino wrestler. He competed at the 1964 Summer Olympics and the 1968 Summer Olympics.
