= Lee Sang-gyun =

South Korean wrestler (1931–2010)

Personal information
- Nationality: South Korean
- Born: 30 November 1931 Seoul, Korea
- Died: 5 November 2010 (aged 78) Seoul, South Korea

Sport
- Sport: Wrestling

Lee Sang-gyun (30 November 1931 – 5 November 2010) was a South Korean wrestler. He competed in the men's freestyle bantamweight at the 1956 Summer Olympics. Lee died in Seoul on 5 November 2010, at the age of 78.
