= Athletics at the 1958 British Empire and Commonwealth Games – Men's discus throw =

Sporting event

Men's discus throw at the Commonwealth Games

The men's discus throw event at the 1958 British Empire and Commonwealth Games was held on 22 July at the Cardiff Arms Park in Cardiff, Wales.

== Results ==
Rank	Name	Nationality	Result	Notes
1st place, gold medalist(s)	Fanie du Plessis	South Africa	183 ft 6 1/2 in (55.94 m)	
2nd place, silver medalist(s)	Les Mills	New Zealand	169 ft 8 1/2 in (51.73 m)	
3rd place, bronze medalist(s)	Gerry Carr	England	169 ft 4 1/2 in (51.63 m)	
4	Mike Lindsay	Scotland	161 ft 0 in (49.07 m)	
5	Mesulame Rakuro	Fiji	157 ft 6 in (48.01 m)	
6	Stanley Raike	Canada	152 ft 11 1/2 in (46.62 m)	
7	Hywel Williams	Wales	152 ft 3 1/2 in (46.42 m)	
8	Peter Isbester	Scotland	151 ft 10 1/2 in (46.29 m)	
9	Muhammad Ayub	Pakistan	149 ft 1 1/2 in (45.45 m)	
10	Balkar Singh	India	148 ft 0 1/2 in (45.12 m)	
11	Eric Cleaver	England	144 ft 3 1/2 in (43.98 m)	
12	Parduman Singh Brar	India	144 ft 0 1/2 in (43.90 m)	
13	Malcolm Pemberton	Wales	136 ft 10 in (41.71 m)	
14	Andrew Payne	Southern Rhodesia	135 ft 6 in (41.30 m)	
15	Benjamin Ovbiagele	Nigeria	134 ft 11 1/2 in (41.14 m)	
	Louis Ogbogu	Nigeria	DNS	
