= Adolfo Díaz (wrestling) =

Argentine wrestler (born 1924)

Personal information
- Nationality: Argentine
- Born: 12 November 1924

Sport
- Sport: Wrestling

Adolfo Díaz (born 12 November 1924) was an Argentine wrestler. He competed in two events at the 1956 Summer Olympics.
