= Mitsuhiro Ohira =

Japanese wrestler (born 1934)

Personal information
- Nationality: Japanese
- Born: 1934 (age 91–92)

Sport
- Sport: Wrestling

Mitsuhiro Ohira (born 1934) is a Japanese wrestler. He competed in the men's freestyle light heavyweight at the 1956 Summer Olympics.
