= Eduardo Campbell =

Panamanian wrestler (1933–1993)

Personal information
- Full name: Eduardo Emilio Campbell De Gracia
- Born: 2 July 1933 Panama
- Died: 16 May 1993 (aged 59)

Sport
- Sport: Wrestling

Eduardo Emilio Campbell De Gracia (2 July 1933 – 16 May 1993) was a Panamanian wrestler. He competed at the 1960 Summer Olympics and the 1964 Summer Olympics.
