= George McKenzie (wrestler) =

Scottish wrestler

Personal information
- Nationality: British (Scottish)

Sport
- Sport: Wrestling
- Event: Lightweight/welterweight
- Club: Leith AWC, Edinburgh

George McKenzie is a former Scottish wrestler who appeared at two Commonwealth Games.

== Biography ==
McKenzie was a member of the Leith Amateur Wrestling Club and was one of three wrestling representatives for the Scottish team at the 1954 British Empire and Commonwealth Games in Vancouver, Canada, where he participated in the lightweight 68kg event.

In 1957 he stepped up in weight to welterweight and defeated the six times champion of Scotland John Allison. He was subsequently selected by Scotland, with George Farquhar and weightlifter Phil Caira for the Festival of Youth in Moscow, a trip that saw the trio detained in Poland following visa issues.

Four years later he was selected for the 1958 Scottish team for the 1958 British Empire and Commonwealth Games in Cardiff, Wales but this time competed in the heavier welterweight category.
