= Mustafa Dağıstanlı =

Turkish wrestler (1931–2022)

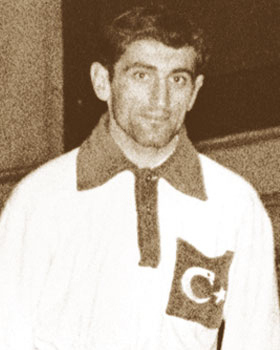
- Dağıstanlı at the 1956 Olympics

Personal information
- Born: 11 April 1931 Söğütpınar, Samsun Province, Turkey
- Died: 18 September 2022 (aged 91) Antalya, Turkey
- Height: 1.68 m (5 ft 6 in)
- Weight: 62 kg (137 lb; 9.8 st)

Sport
- Sport: Wrestling
- Events: Freestyle; Greco-Roman
Medal record
Representing Turkey
Men's freestyle wrestling
Olympic Games
Gold medal – first place	1956 Melbourne	57 kg
Gold medal – first place	1960 Rome	62 kg
World Championships
Gold medal – first place	1954 Tokyo	57 kg
Gold medal – first place	1957 Istanbul	62 kg
Gold medal – first place	1959 Tehran	62 kg
World Cup
Gold medal – first place	1956 Istanbul	57 kg
Silver medal – second place	1958 Sofia	62 kg
Balkan Championships
Gold medal – first place	1960 Burgas	62 kg
Men's Greco-Roman wrestling
Mediterranean Games
Gold medal – first place	1955 Barcelona	57 kg

Mustafa Dağıstanlı (11 April 1931 – 18 September 2022) was a Turkish wrestler. He had his best achievements in freestyle wrestling, winning gold medals at the 1956 and 1960 Olympics and 1954, 1957, and 1959 world championships. In Greco-Roman wrestling he won a gold medal at the 1955 Mediterranean Games. He is credited with 389 wins and 4 draws in 393 matches.

== Wrestling career ==
Mustafa Dağıstanlı took up wrestling at the age of 18, having been involved in Turkish oil wrestling for many years before that. He developed into one of the best freestyle wrestlers in the world in the 1950s, but also excelled in the Greco-Roman style. In 1952, he narrowly missed qualifying for the Olympic Games in Helsinki. In 1953, however, he was already a member of the Turkish national wrestling team, which was in Sweden for two international matches. Dağıstanlı won on points against Edvin Vesterby and Göte Persson in the bantamweight division.

Dağıstanlı made his debut at an international championship in 1954 at the world championship in Tokyo in the bantamweight free style. He won the world title straight away with three shoulder victories and two points victories ahead of the Hungarian Lajos Bencze and Tauno Jaskari from Finland.

In 1956, Dağıstanlı also achieved Olympic honours for the first time. In Melbourne, he became the superior Olympic bantamweight champion with five victories. He repeated this success in Rome in 1960 in the featherweight category. In Rome he even managed six victories, so that the draw in the seventh fight against the Japanese Tamiji Sato did not prevent his triumph.

Between the Olympic Games in Rome, Dağıstanlı had become the free style featherweight world champion in Istanbul in 1957 and in Tehran in 1959. In Istanbul he won all his fights, in Tehran he had to accept a draw against Muhamad Ahkbar from Pakistan. There were no world championships in the free style in 1955 and 1958. In 1958, Dağıstanlı also visited the Federal Republic of Germany with a Turkish wrestling team. He put his opponents Klaus Rost, Erwin Schuster, Johann Argstatter and Gawlinski on his shoulders in four friendly bouts.

Mustafa Dağıstanlı, who ended his active wrestling career after the 1960 Olympic Games, was one of the best bantamweight and featherweight freestyle wrestlers in the world between 1954 and 1960. He won all but one of the major championships and tournaments in which he competed. Only at the 1958 World Cup in Sofia did he only finish second in the featherweight division behind the Soviet athlete Nurik Muschegijan, because he wrestled to a draw twice in that tournament and Muschegijan only once.

After his active time as a wrestler, Mustafa Dağıstanlı worked as a coach and took part in the Turkish Wrestling Federation. Following his retirement, he entered politics and served between 1973 and 1980 as deputy of his hometown, Samsun, for the Justice Party. Later, he owned an overland coach business in Ankara bearing his surname and the Olympic rings as a logo.

He was inducted into the FILA International Wrestling Hall of Fame in September 2009 for his services to wrestling. He died in September 2022 at the age of 91. On 20 September, after the funeral prayer at Ankara Kocatepe Mosque, he was buried in Karşıyaka Cemetery.
