= Minoru Iizuka =

Japanese wrestler (1933–2022)

Personal information
- Nationality: Japanese
- Born: 6 February 1933 Niigata, Japan
- Died: 29 May 2022 (aged 89) Niigata, Japan

Sport
- Sport: Wrestling

Minoru Iizuka (6 February 1933 – 29 May 2022) was a Japanese wrestler. He competed in the men's freestyle bantamweight at the 1956 Summer Olympics. Iizuka died in Niigata on 29 May 2022, at the age of 89.
