= Im Kwang-jae =

South Korean wrestler

Personal information
- Nationality: South Korean
- Born: 22 February 1938 (age 88) Seoul, South Korea

Sport
- Sport: Wrestling

Im Kwang-jae (born 22 February 1938) is a South Korean wrestler. He competed in the men's freestyle bantamweight at the 1960 Summer Olympics.
