= Petko Sirakov =

Bulgarian wrestler (1929–1996)

Medal record

Men's Greco-Roman wrestling

Representing Bulgaria

Olympic Games
Silver medal – second place	1956 Melbourne	Light heavyweight

World Cup
Silver medal – second place	1956 Istanbul	Light heavyweight

Petko Sirakov (Bulgarian: Петко Сираков) (16 February 1929 – 8 April 1996) was a Bulgarian wrestler who competed in the 1956 Summer Olympics. He was the father of the former Bulgarian footballer Nasko Sirakov.
