= Hüseyin Akbaş =

Turkish freestyle wrestler

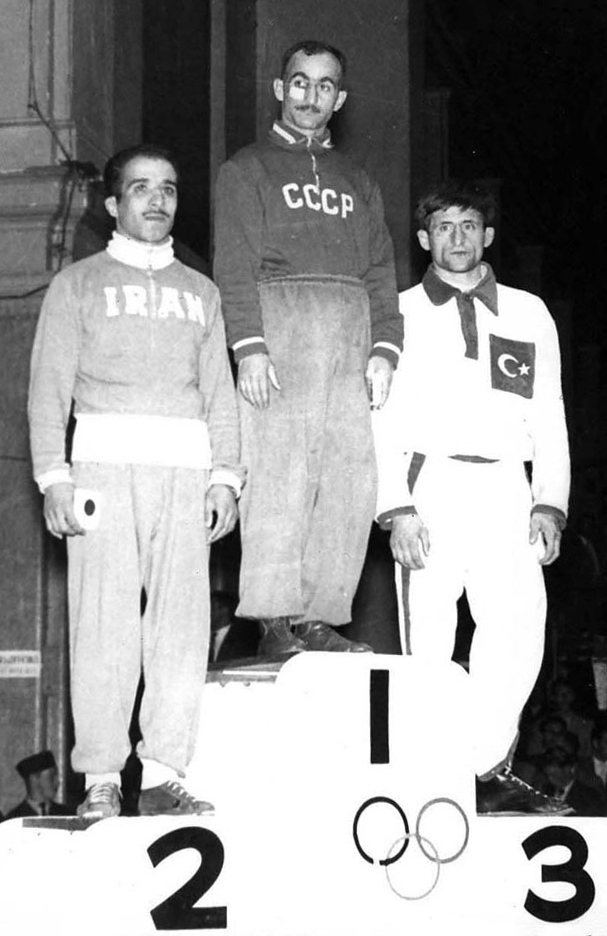
- Akbaş (right) at the 1956 Olympics

Personal information
- Born: 1 January 1933 Tokat, Turkey
- Died: 15 February 1989 (aged 56) Tokat, Turkey

Sport
- Sport: Wrestling
- Events: Freestyle; Greco-Roman
Medal record
Representing Turkey
Freestyle wrestling
Olympic Games
Silver medal – second place	1964 Tokyo	57 kg
Bronze medal – third place	1956 Melbourne	52 kg
World Championships
Gold medal – first place	1954 Tokyo	52 kg
Gold medal – first place	1957 Istanbul	57 kg
Gold medal – first place	1959 Tehran	57 kg
Gold medal – first place	1962 Toledo	57 kg
Bronze medal – third place	1961 Yokohama	57 kg
World Cup
Gold medal – first place	1956 Istanbul	52 kg
Gold medal – first place	1958 Sofia	57 kg
Greco-Roman wrestling
World Championships
Bronze medal – third place	1955 Karlsruhe	52 kg

Hüseyin Akbaş (1 January 1933 – 15 February 1989) was a Turkish wrestler. He competed in freestyle wrestling at the 1956, 1960 and 1964 Olympics and won a bronze medal in 1956 and a silver in 1964. Akbaş won the world freestyle title in 1954, 1957, 1959 and 1962, placing third in 1955 and 1961 and fourth in 1965. In 2011 he was inducted into the United World Wrestling Hall of Fame.

== Wrestling career ==
Hüseyin Akbaş grew up in the small town of Tokat in Asia Minor and took up the Turkish national sport of oil wrestling at an early age. Later he also took up Olympic wrestling, developing into an excellent wrestler in both styles, but preferring the free style. He moved to Ankara, which later earned him the nickname "Lion of Ankara" in the Turkish press, and was already part of the Turkish national wrestling team at the age of 20. He made his debut on the international wrestling mat at the 1954 World Championships in Tokyo, where he immediately became world champion in the flyweight free style with five wins and also defeated the Japanese title favourite Yūshū Kitano.

In 1955 he also competed in the Greco-Roman style at the World Championships in Karlsruhe and won the bronze medal. Nail Garayev from the Soviet Union and Ignazio Fabra from Italy defeated him in this style.

At the 1956 Olympic Games in Melbourne, he was considered the favourite in the flyweight free style. However, he suffered a surprising defeat after four victories against the Iranian Mohammad Ali Khojastepour and thus only won the bronze medal.

Between the 1956 and 1960 Olympic Games, world championships were held in Istanbul in 1957 and Tehran in 1959. Huseyin had reached the zenith of his performance at both events and won both world titles in the bantamweight division undefeated. At the 1960 Olympic Games in Rome, he was therefore once again considered the favourite. However, he had two very bad days of competition in Rome, wrestled to a draw only once and lost two bouts and ended up in 14th place, which was not acceptable for him.

Hüseyin did not give up, however, and won the bronze medal in the bantamweight bout at the 1961 World Championships in Yokohama and became world champion in the free style for the fourth time in 1962 in Toledo/USA. Finally, at the 1964 Olympic Games in Tokyo, he came close to winning the Olympics, but was then narrowly defeated on points in a ravishing fight by Japan's Yōjirō Uetake, who had spent four years preparing for this event in the United States.

At the 1965 World Championships in Manchester he missed the medal places with a 4th place and did not compete in World Championships or Olympic Games after that.

Hüseyin Akbaş was also well known in German wrestling circles. He was a member of a Turkish team that toured the Federal Republic of Germany in 1959. Hüseyin competed four times and shouldered his German opponents Fritz Schrader from Hörde, Siegfried Wagner from Kornwestheim, Ewald Tauer from Munich and Klaus Derichs from Bonn in a short time.

He ended his international wrestling career in 1967 and was then a wrestling coach in Tokat. For his services to the sport of wrestling, he was inducted into the FILA International Wrestling Hall of Fame in September 2011.
