= Edvin Vesterby =

Swedish wrestler (born 1927)

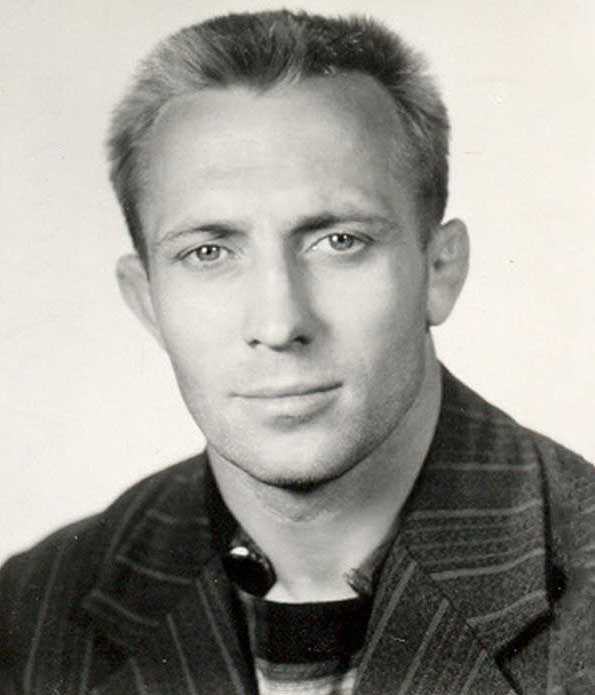

Personal information
- Born: 23 October 1927 (age 98) Riguldi, Estonia
- Height: 163 cm (5 ft 4 in)

Sport
- Sport: Greco-Roman wrestling
- Club: Djurgårdens IF, Stockholm
Medal record
Representing Sweden
Olympic Games
Silver medal – second place	1956 Melbourne	Bantamweight

Edvin Vesterby (born 23 October 1927) is a retired Swedish bantamweight wrestler. He competed at the 1952, 1956 and 1960 Olympics in freestyle and Greco-Roman wrestling and won a Greco-Roman silver medal in 1956. He finished fourth in the freestyle in 1952 and in the Greco-Roman wrestling in 1960. He was born in Riguldi Parish (now Noarootsi Parish), Lääne County, Estonia into a Swedish-speaking family. In 1943 he emigrated to Sweden and started wrestling in 1947 in Stockholm.

Vesterby represented Djurgårdens IF.
