= Kevin Coote =

Australian wrestler

Personal information
- Nationality: Australian
- Born: 29 April 1931; Parkdale, Victoria, Australia
- Died: 8 May 2013 (aged 82)

Sport
- Sport: Wrestling

Kevin Melville Coote (29 April 1931 – 8 May 2013) was an Australian wrestler. He competed at the 1952 Summer Olympics and the 1956 Summer Olympics.
