= Karl-Erik Nilsson (wrestler) =

Swedish wrestler (1922–2017)

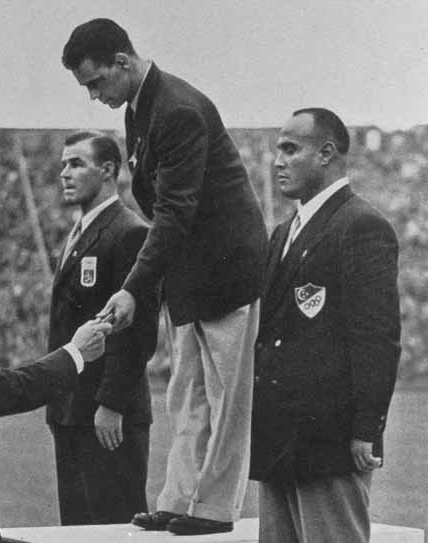
- Nilsson (center) at the 1948 Olympics

Personal information
- Born: 4 January 1922 Stehag, Sweden
- Died: 14 December 2017 (aged 95)

Sport
- Sport: Greco-Roman wrestling
- Club: GAK Enighet, Malmö
Medal record
Men's Greco-Roman wrestling
Representing Sweden
Olympic Games
Gold medal – first place	1948 London	Light heavyweight
Bronze medal – third place	1952 Helsinki	Light heavyweight
Bronze medal – third place	1956 Melbourne	Light heavyweight
World Championships
Bronze medal – third place	1955 Karlsruhe	Light heavyweight

Karl-Erik Nilsson (4 January 1922 – 14 December 2017) was a light-heavyweight (-87 kg) Greco-Roman wrestler from Sweden. He competed at the 1948, 1952 and 1956 Olympics and won one gold (in 1948) and two bronze medals. He won another bronze medal at the 1955 World Wrestling Championships. He died in December 2017.
