= Tadashi Asai =

Japanese wrestler (1935–1990)

Tadashi Asai (28 November 1935 – 6 January 1990) was a Japanese wrestler who competed in the 1956 Summer Olympics and in the 1960 Summer Olympics.
