= Tauno Jaskari =

Finnish wrestler (born 1934)

Personal information
- Nationality: Finnish
- Born: 1 June 1934 (age 92) Nurmo, Finland

Sport
- Sport: Wrestling
Medal record
Representing Finland
World Championships
Bronze medal – third place	1954 Tokyo	57 kg
Silver medal – second place	1957 Istanbul	57 kg
Silver medal – second place	1959 Tehran	57 kg

Tauno Jaskari (born 1 June 1934) is a Finnish wrestler. He competed at the 1952, 1956, 1960 and the 1964 Summer Olympics.
