= Peter Blair (wrestler) =

American wrestler (1932–1994)

Personal information
- Born: February 14, 1932 Cleveland, Ohio, U.S.
- Died: June 29, 1994 (aged 62) Stephenson, Michigan, U.S.
- Home town: Norfolk, Virginia, U.S.

Sport
- Country: United States
- Sport: Wrestling
- Events: Freestyle and Folkstyle
- College team: Navy
- Club: U.S. Navy
- Team: USA
Medal record
Men's freestyle wrestling
Representing the United States
Olympic Games
Bronze medal – third place	1956 Melbourne	87 kg
Collegiate Wrestling
Representing the Navy Midshipmen
NCAA Championships
Gold medal – first place	1954 Norman	191 lb
Gold medal – first place	1955 Ithaca	191 lb

Peter Blair (February 14, 1932 – June 29, 1994) was an American wrestler and naval officer. He was Olympic bronze medalist in Freestyle wrestling in 1956. A Norfolk, Virginia native, Blair attended Granby High School graduating at age 16. He would then go on to attend the Naval Academy, graduating in 1955 and winning two NCAA crowns at 190-pounds. His greatest year was 1956 when he won the Eastern All-Navy heavyweight title, the All-Navy title at 191-pounds, the 191-pound class at the AAU Championships, and then won the Olympic Trials. After the Olympics he retired from wrestling and became a career Naval officer. In 2009, he was inducted into the National Wrestling Hall of Fame as a Distinguished Member.
