= Lila Ram =

Indian wrestler (1930–2003)

Lila Ram Sangwan
Personal information
- Nationality: Indian
- Born: 30 November 1930 Mandola village, Charkhi Dadri district, Haryana
- Died: 11 October 2003 (aged 72) Charkhi Dadri district, Haryana

Sport
- Country: India
- Sport: Freestyle wrestling
Medal record
Representing India
British Empire and Commonwealth Games
Gold medal – first place	1958 Cardiff	+87 kg

Lila Ram Sangwan (30 November 1930 – 11 October 2003) was an Indian wrestler from Charkhi Dadri district of Haryana, who was the first Indian to win a gold medal in the Commonwealth Games. He won a gold medal in the heavyweight (100 kg) category in the 1958 British Empire and Commonwealth Games. Lila Ram competed in the freestyle wrestling in heavyweight and superheavyweight categories at the national as well as international level.

== Early life ==
Lila Ram was on 30 November 1930, in Mandola village of Charkhi Dadri district in a farmer’s family.

== Career ==
In 1948, he joined the Grenadiers Regimental Centre, which was located at Nasirabad at that time, where his career in wrestling began. He reigned as the national heavyweight champion in the late 50s and early 60s.

Lila Ram was the captain of the wrestling team, which participated in the 1956 Summer Olympics in Melbourne. In 1958, he won a gold medal in the British Empire and Commonwealth Games held in Cardiff, defeating Jacobus Hanekom of South Africa in the finals. In this event, he defeated wrestlers from Canada, Pakistan and England in the earlier rounds of the event. In 1956, during the Indo-Iran Tests, he defeated Rustam-e-Iran Mohammed Ali.

== Later days ==
After retiring from active wrestling, he maintained his links with sports. He was the chief coach of the Indian wrestling team which participated in the 1968 Summer Olympics held in Mexico City and the World Wrestling Championships held in Delhi. His remained as a coach of the Services team till 1973. He served the Sports Department of the Government of Haryana as Assistant Director of Sports from 1980 to 1988. He died on 11 October 2003 in Charkhi Dadri in Bhiwani district.

== Awards and honours ==
In 1998, Lila Ram was awarded the Padma Shri in recognition of his contributions to sports.
