= Fred Kämmerer =

German wrestler

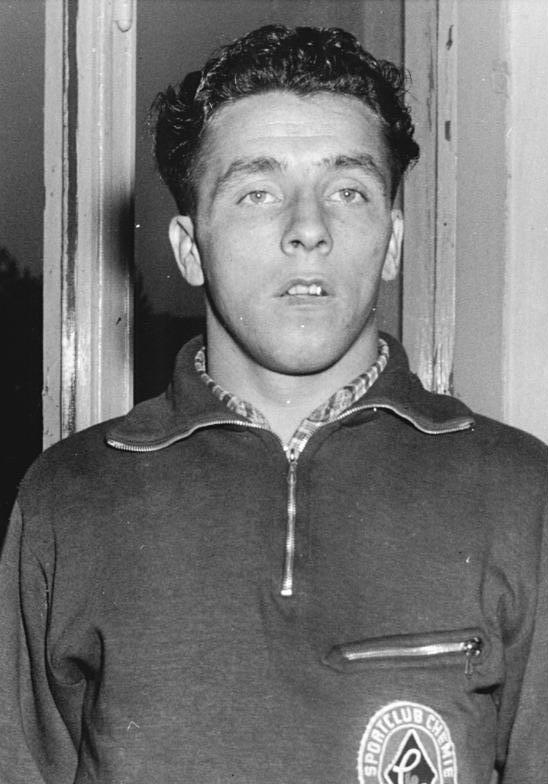
- Fred Kämmerer in 1956

Personal information
- Nationality: German
- Born: 10 January 1934 (age 91); Obergreißlau, Germany

Sport
- Sport: Wrestling

Fred Kämmerer (born 10 January 1934) is a German wrestler. He competed at the 1956 Summer Olympics and the 1960 Summer Olympics.
