= Ian Epton =

Zambian wrestler

Medal record

Men's Wrestling

Representing Northern Rhodesia

Commonwealth Games
Bronze medal – third place	1954 Vancouver	Bantamweight

Representing South Africa

Commonwealth Games
Gold medal – first place	1958 Cardiff	Flyweight

Ian Epton is a former wrestler from Zambia, which was then the British protectorate of Northern Rhodesia.

He competed at the 1954 British Empire Games, and won a bronze medal for wrestling in the Men's Bantamweight class. In the 1958 British Empire and Commonwealth Games, he won a gold medal for South Africa in the flyweight category.
