= Mehdi Yaghoubi =

Iranian wrestler (1930–2021)

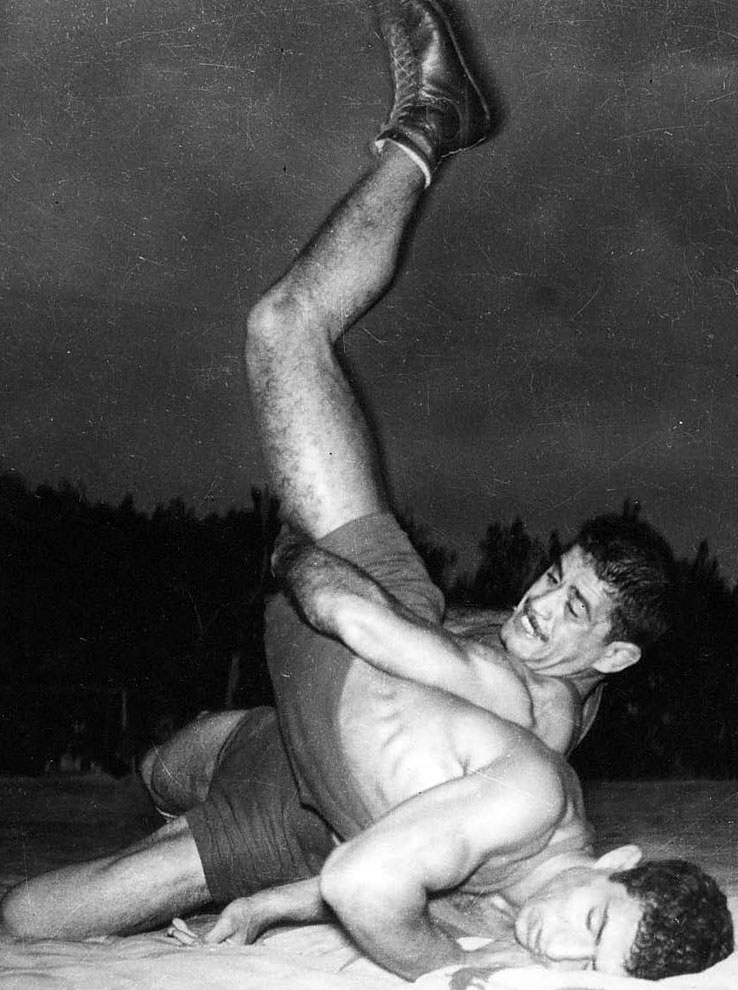
- Mehdi Yaghoubi (top)

Personal information
- Born: 2 April 1930 Qazvin, Iran
- Died: 25 September 2021 (aged 91)

Sport
- Sport: Freestyle wrestling
Medal record
Representing Iran
Olympic Games
Silver medal – second place	1956 Melbourne	57 kg
World Championships
Bronze medal – third place	1951 Helsinki	57 kg

Mohammad Mahdi Yaghoubi (Persian: محمدمهدی یعقوبی; 2 April 1930 – 25 September 2021) was an Iranian bantamweight freestyle wrestler. He competed at the 1952, 1956 and 1960 Olympics and won a silver medal in 1956 in his weight category of under 57 kg. He also won a bronze medal at the 1951 World Wrestling Championships and placed fifth in 1954.

Yaghoubi had four brothers and four sisters. He quit school at the age of 15 to make free time for work and sport.
