= Boris Kulaev =

Russian wrestler (1929–2008)

Olympic medal record

Men's freestyle wrestling

Representing the Soviet Union

Olympic Games
Silver medal – second place	1956 Melbourne	87 kg

World Cup
Silver medal – second place	1956 Istanbul	87 kg

Boris Kulaev (18 July 1929 – 12 August 2008) was a Russian wrestler who competed in the 1956 Summer Olympics.
