= Luigi Chinazzo =

Italian wrestler

Personal information
- Nationality: Italian
- Born: 18 July 1932; Pederobba, Italy
- Died: 19 January 2000 (aged 67); Bracciano

Sport
- Sport: Wrestling

Luigi Chinazzo (18 July 1932 – 19 January 2000) was an Italian wrestler. He competed at the 1956 Summer Olympics and the 1960 Summer Olympics.
