= Veikko Lahti =

Finnish wrestler (1926–2014)

Personal information
- Nationality: Finnish
- Born: 7 December 1926; Janakkala, Finland
- Died: 28 July 2014 (aged 87); Kotka, Finland

Sport
- Sport: Wrestling

Veikko Lahti (7 December 1926 – 28 July 2014) was a Finnish wrestler. He competed at the 1952 Summer Olympics and the 1956 Summer Olympics.
