= Mikhail Shakhov =

Soviet wrestler (1931–2018)

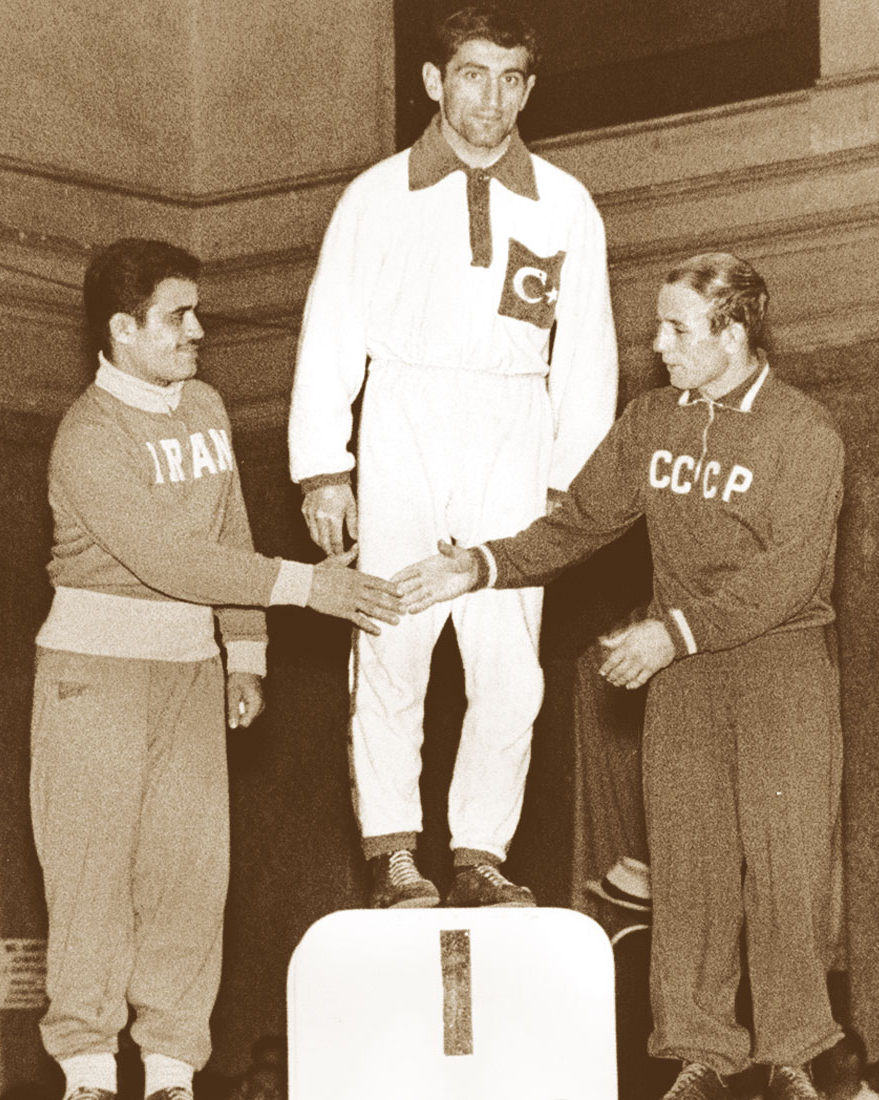
- Shakhov (right) at the 1956 Olympics

Personal information
- Born: 20 November 1931 Saratov Oblast, Russian SFSR, Soviet Union
- Died: 8 August 2018 (aged 86) Kiev, Ukraine
- Height: 159 cm (5 ft 3 in)

Sport
- Sport: Freestyle wrestling
- Club: Dynamo Kiev
- Coached by: Armenak Yaltyryan, Vasily Rybalko
Medal record
Representing the Soviet Union
Olympic Games
Bronze medal – third place	1956 Melbourne	57 kg
World Cup
Bronze medal – third place	1958 Sofia	57 kg

Mikhail Afanasyevich Shakhov (Russian: Михаил Афанасьевич Шахов; 20 November 1931 – 8 August 2018) was a Soviet bantamweight freestyle wrestler.

== Biography ==
He was born in Saratov in 1931. Shakhov lost his father in 1942, during World War II. He was raised in Saratov Oblast, Russian SFSR, and took up wrestling in Kiev, Ukrainian SSR, while serving with the Soviet Army there. He started serving in Internal Troops of the Ministry of Internal Affairs of the USSR in Kiev in 1951. Then he started training in Sambo and, in 1954, became the champion of the USSR. He competed at the 1956 and 1960 Olympics and won a bronze medal in 1956. He stayed in Kiev for most of his life. Shakhov won the Soviet bantamweight title in 1956, 1960 and 1961, placing third in 1957. His favorite technique was kata guruma. After retiring from competitions, he worked as a wrestling coach in Ukraine and Poland. His trainees include Taras Danko and Valeriy Andriytsev.

In 1957, Shakhov married Anastasiya, a woman from Saratov Oblast five years his junior; she died of cancer in 2004. The couple had a daughter Larisa, who was married to the basketball player Alexander Belostenny and lived in Germany.

== Death ==
He died in 2018 at the age of 87.
