= Geoffrey Jameson =

Australian wrestler (1928–2017)

Personal information
- Nationality: Australian
- Born: 18 August 1928 Temora, New South Wales, Australia
- Died: 8 November 2017 (aged 89)

Sport
- Sport: Wrestling

Geoffrey Jameson (18 August 1928 – 8 November 2017) was an Australian wrestler. He competed at the 1956 Summer Olympics and the 1960 Summer Olympics.
