= Robert Steckle =

Canadian wrestler (1930–2022)

- Weight: 191 lb (87 kg)
- Born: August 21, 1930; Kitchener, Ontario, Canada
- Died: September 25, 2022 (aged 92); Kitchener, Ontario, Canada
- High school: Kitchener Collegiate Institute
- College: University of Guelph
- Olympic team: Canada
- Status: Retired

Robert Steckle
Medal record

Men's wrestling

Representing Canada

British Empire and Commonwealth Games
| Silver medal – second place | 1954 Vancouver | Light Heavyweight |
| Bronze medal – third place | 1958 Cardiff | Light Heavyweight |

Pan American Games
| Silver medal – second place | 1963 São Paulo | Light Heavyweight |

Robert John Steckle (August 21, 1930 – September 25, 2022) was a Greco-Roman and freestyle wrestler from Canada who competed in three consecutive summer Olympic Games, starting in 1952. He carried the Canadian flag at the opening ceremonies of the 1956 Summer Olympic Games in Melbourne, Australia, the only Canadian wrestler ever to do so. He was born in Kitchener, Ontario.

Steckle won silver at the 1954 British Empire and Commonwealth Games (light heavyweight 87 kg) and bronze at the 1958 Empire Commonwealth Games (light heavyweight 87 kg). He took silver at the 1963 Pan-American Games (87 kg).

Steckle was the 1955 and 1957 AAU Greco-Roman National Champion (191 lbs), as well as the Canadian Freestyle champion in 1951, 1952, 1954, 1956, 1957, 1959, 1960, 1962, and 1963, and Greco-Roman champion in 1952, 1956, and 1960. He was inducted as an Athlete into the Canadian Wrestling Hall of Fame in 1983, and into the University of Guelph Gryphon Hall of Fame in 1984 for his contributions to Gryphon football as the 1951 Wildman Trophy recipient in addition to his accomplishments in wrestling.
