= Jan Theron =

South African wrestler (1930–1993)

Personal information
- Nationality: South African
- Born: 25 August 1930 Marquard, Free State, South Africa
- Died: 24 November 1993 (aged 63) Pretoria, Gauteng, South Africa

Sport
- Sport: Wrestling

Jacob Louis Theron (25 August 1930 – 24 November 1993) was a South African wrestler. He competed at the 1952 Summer Olympics and the 1956 Summer Olympics.
