= Dora Armitage =

Dora Elizabeth Armitage
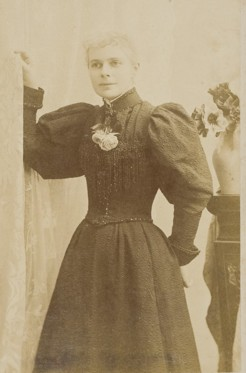
- in 1897
- Born: Dora Elizabeth Robertson; 14 July 1858; St. Clair, Michigan
- Died: 30 May 1945 (aged 87); England
- Occupation: typing teacher
- Known for: teaching typing
- Spouse(s): Charles Cyrus Armitage; Walter White Wingrove Cooke
- Children: four

Dora Elizabeth Armitage (14 July 1858 – 30 May 1945) was an American-born teacher of typing. She was one of the first in Australia. She was a leading member of the National Council of Women.

== Life ==
Armitage was born in 1858 in St. Clair, Michigan. She went to England for her education and in 1877 she was in Ceylon (now Sri Lanka) where she married Charles Cyrus Armitage. They had four children in Ceylon, but her husband's business collapsed and she took their four children to the UK. Five years later her husband was in Australia where his new business was also failing. Dora and three of their children went out to join him in Sydney.

She knew how to type and she supported the family by teaching others. In 1888 she was at the Melbourne Centennial Exhibition where she won a medal for her typing. Her testimonial about her Calligraph typewriter was used by its manufacturers in their advertising. She had bought a Caligraph 2 when she arrived in Australia and this was a model that featured a button for every upper and lower case letter.

In 1888 the Ladies' Type-writing Association, which she had started, was given a special prize at the Exhibition of Women's Industries. The exhibition had been organised by Lady Carrington and it was held in Sydney. In 1891 she won another prize for her typewriting at the National Juvenile Industrial Exhibition again in Sydney.

The National Council of Women was formed in 1896 and she was elected their founding treasurer and in the following year she was their secretary. Her first husband died that year.

In 1900 she was one of the signatories with Louisa Macdonald, Helen McMillan, Rose Scott, Zara B. Aronson (and others) of a letter sent by the National Council of Women. They drew attention of the authorities to the success of women as sanitary inspectors in England. They had been appointed by Thomas Orme Dudfield and they suggested that Sydney should follow his lead.

She married Walter White Wingrove Cooke in 1902. Armitage died in England in 1945. Her son Hugh Traill Armitage was a leading banker and died in 1963.
