= Rose Scott =

Australian suffragist (1847–1925)

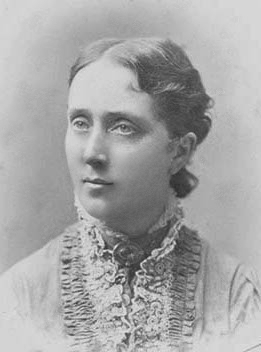
- Scott in 1883
- Born: 8 October 1847; Glendon, near Singleton, New South Wales
- Died: 20 April 1925 (aged 77); Sydney, New South Wales
- Known for: founding the Women's Political Education League

Rose Scott (8 October 1847 – 20 April 1925) was an Australian women's rights activist who advocated for women's suffrage and was a womanuniversal suffrage in New South Wales at the turn-of-the twentieth century. She founded the Women's Political Education League in 1902 which campaigned successfully to raise the age of consent to sixteen.

== Early life ==
Scott was the daughter of Helenus Scott (1802–1879) and Sarah Ann Scott (née Rusden) aka Saranna, the fifth of eight children, and a granddaughter of Helenus Scott (1760–1821), a Scottish physician. Her cousins were the naturalists Harriet Morgan (née Scott) and Helena Scott. She was educated at home with her closest sister Augusta. From an early age, Rose Scott was influenced by injustices she perceived towards women in history and literature such as Joan of Arc and Katherina Minola in The Taming of the Shrew.

== Women's rights work ==
Scott was essentially an individualist, but not a dogmatic one, and may be described as an adherent to the liberalism of John Stuart Mill. She was utilitarian in outlook, a free trader, pacifistically inclined and strongly in favour of women's rights.

In 1882, Scott began to hold a weekly salon in her Sydney home. Through these meetings, she became well known amongst politicians, judges, philanthropists, writers and poets. In 1889, she helped to found the Women's Literary Society, which grew into the Womanhood Suffrage League of New South Wales in 1891. In April 1892 she participated in a public debate with fellow suffragist Eliza Ashton on Ashton's controversial views on marriage.

In 1900 she was one of the signatories with Louisa Macdonald, Helen McMillan, Dora Elizabeth Armitage, Zara Aronson (and others) of a letter sent by the National Council of Women. They drew attention of the authorities to the success of women as sanitary inspectors in England. They had been appointed by Thomas Orme Dudfield and they suggested that Sydney should follow his lead.

Scott founded and became the first President of the Women's Political Education League in 1902, a position she held until 1910. The League established branches throughout the state and consistently campaigned for the issue closest to Scott's heart: raising the age of consent from 14 to 16, achieved in 1910 with the Crimes (Girls' Protection) Act. She was president of the Sydney Branch of the London Peace Society from its foundation in 1907 to 1916, when she stepped down, succeeded by William Cooper. Other post-suffrage feminist reform campaigns she participated in included the Family Maintenance and Guardianship of Infants (1916), Women's Legal Status (1918) and First Offenders (Women) 1918 Acts.

There is a prize for female law students, The Rose Scott Prize for Proficiency at Graduation by a Woman Candidate, at Sydney University.

Scott was opposed to Federation and conscription. She was an Anglican pacifist.

== Opposition to Federation ==
In the late 1890s Scott was an ardent and leading opponent of the cause of Federation. The cause was, she said, 'the gravest danger which had ever threatened Australia'. 'The cry was for unity', she told large audiences, 'but it was forgotten that many crimes were committed in that name'. She traced the apparent inclination of public opinion to Federation to 'the freedom of the Australian people' having been 'too easily gained, and therefore too lightly prized'.

== Death ==
She died from cancer on 20 April 1925 at her home, Lynton, in Jersey Road, Woollahra.

Rose Scott Circuit, in the Canberra suburb of Chisholm, is named in her honour.

== See also ==
- Peace movements in Australia

== Resources ==
- Allen, Judith A. Rose Scott: Vision and Revision in Feminism. Oxford University Press, 1994. ISBN 0195548469
- National Library of Australia. Scott, Rose (1847–1925). The National Library of Australia's Federation Gateway
- State Library of New South Wales. Papers of the Scott family, 1777–1925 (ML MSS 38)
