= Diplomatic history of Australia =

Australian history

The diplomatic history of Australia encompasses the historical events surrounding Australian foreign relations. Following the global change in the dynamics of international state of affairs in the 20th century, this saw a transition within Australia's diplomatic situation to broaden outside of exclusively commonwealth and western European nations. Its core relationship was with Great Britain until 1941, and with the United States and New Zealand since then as represented by ANZUS. In the 21st century trade has soared with China. However, relations have cycled back and forth from friendly to strained. For recent relations see also Foreign relations of Australia.

== 1901–1914: Post-Federation years ==
The Department of External Affairs was created upon the federation of the Australian colonies, but largely remained an appendage of the Prime Minister's Department. In the view of early governments, foreign policy meant "relations with London on matters of imperial foreign policy on which Australia might have an interest". Australia's first prime minister Edmund Barton was in favour of a uniform foreign policy for the British Empire, suggesting Australia could have no "foreign policy of its own" but expected that the British government would defer to the Australian perspective for "regional" imperial policy. Barton's successor Alfred Deakin took some of the first steps towards diplomatic independence by dealing directly with the Japanese consul-general, for which he was reminded by the Colonial Office that it "expected Australia to conduct any dealings with a foreign power through London". He also dealt directly with the U.S. consul in Sydney to engineer the visit of the Great White Fleet in 1908. His actions "set a precedent for unilateralism" in foreign policy that was followed by his immediate successors as prime minister, with a continued reliance on the British diplomatic service and policy-making apparatus and no efforts to develop Australian equivalents.

Deakin repeatedly lobbied the British government for greater consultation on imperial foreign policy and suggested the establishment of an imperial department of state to coordinate policy, as part of his broader support for an Imperial Federation. Outside of the prime minister, the Australian High Commissioner to the United Kingdom remained the most significant figure conduit for Australian foreign relations. The significance of the role was emphasised by the fact that its first three appointees (spanning from 1910 to 1927) were former prime ministers.

== 1914–1931: World War I and aftermath ==
World War I brought about an increase in direct Australian interactions with nations outside the British Empire, prompted by strategic concerns including the fate of German territories captured by Allied troops during the war. Prime Minister Billy Hughes visited the United States in 1918 and "in a series of meetings and speeches, called on the US to cooperate with Australia in ensuring postwar security in the Far East". At the 1919 Paris Peace Conference, Hughes led an Australian section within the British delegation and signed the Treaty of Versailles on behalf of Australia, as with other British dominions. Hughes lobbied powerfully for Australian interests at the conference, including the granting of League of Nations mandates over the former German New Guinea and Nauru and opposition to Japan's Racial Equality Proposal to protect the White Australia policy.

The 1920s marked "the genesis of a distinct Australian foreign policy", largely in response to changing power dynamics in the Pacific following the Washington Naval Conference of 1922 and the subsequent decline in British influence. However, in the short-term Australia continued to rely on "the UK and its imperial machinery for diplomatic representation and economic and material security". Following the 1923 Imperial Conference, attempts to formulate a uniform imperial foreign policy were largely abandoned in favour of a system of dominion ratification of British decisions. Governmental interest in foreign policy declined during the Great Depression as the Scullin government concentrated on internal economic matters. In 1929, internationalist Frederic Eggleston complained to a Senate committee that "no parliament which is responsible for its own foreign policy has less discussion on foreign affairs than does the Australian Parliament".

=== Trade service and "quasi-diplomatic" appointments ===
The Hughes government sought to establish an independent trade commissioner service, having rejected a previous offer to share the British trade service. Trade and customs minister Jens Jensen's June 1918 report recommended the appointment of trade commissioners in Canada, Japan, Russia, South Africa and the United States, who "would link with but not rely upon the British consular service". However, for post-war budgetary reasons the scheme was significantly scaled back.

While not establishing formal diplomatic relations, Australia made a number of "quasi-diplomatic" appointments in the post-war period, who functioned as official representatives of the Australian government but held no diplomatic rank. These included appointment of Henry Braddon to the United States in 1918 with the title of "commissioner" and the appointment of Clive Voss as "commercial agent" in France in 1919. The American posting endured until 1930, with Herbert Brookes serving as the only "commissioner-general for Australia in the United States" until the position was abolished by the Scullin government for cost reasons.

In 1921, Australia appointed its first official representative in Asia, with the appointment of Edward S. Little as trade commissioner to China, based in Shanghai. Senator Thomas Bakhap undertook a trade mission to China in 1922 at the instigation of Hughes, and in the same year Egbert Sheaf was appointed as a trade commissioner to "the East", based in Singapore. The initial trade commissioner service was partially funded by state governments and ultimately failed due to a lack of support from Prime Minister Stanley Bruce and state premiers.

== 1930s: Appeasement ==
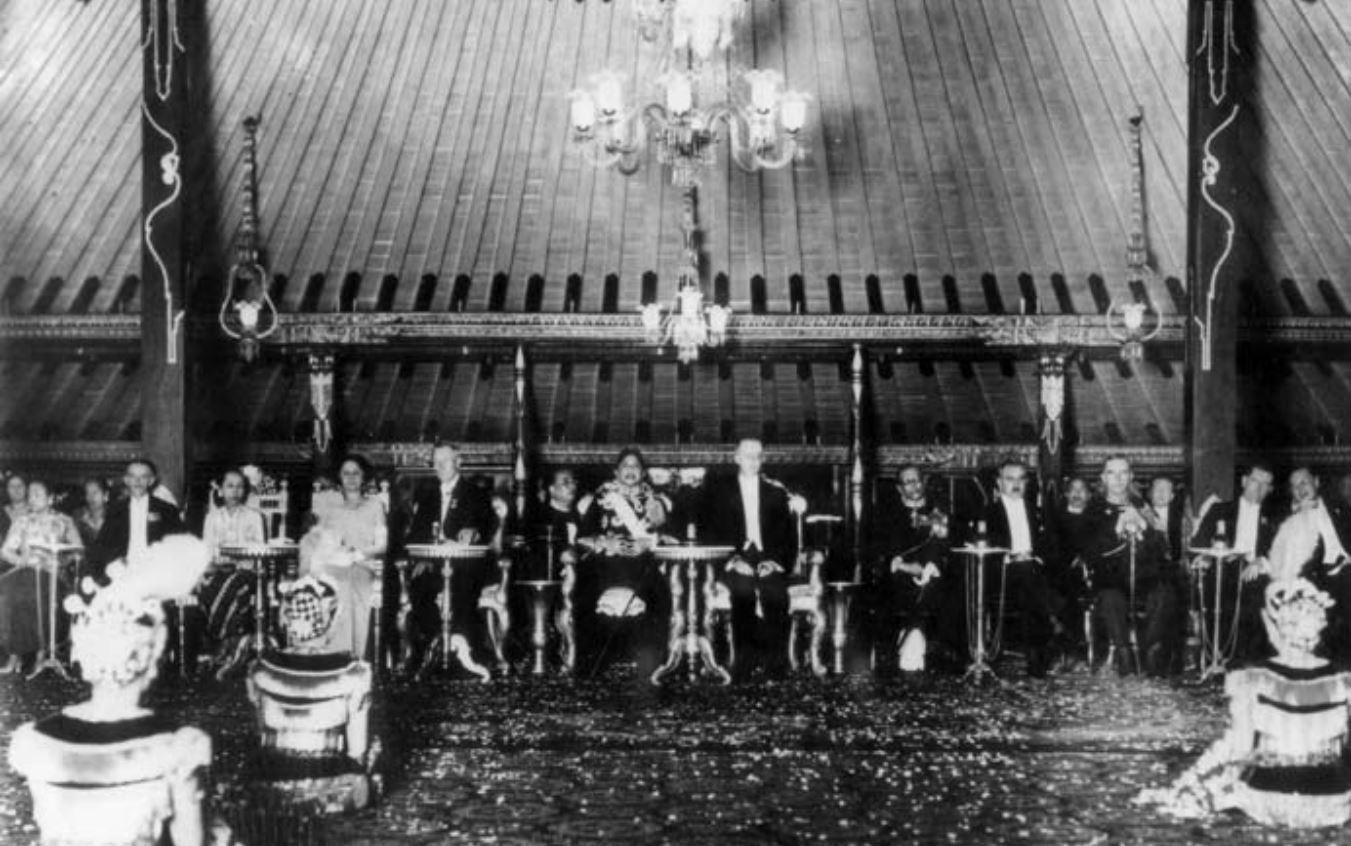
Australian deputy prime minister John Latham in Yogyakarta (present-day Indonesia) during the Australian Eastern Mission of 1934

During the 1930s, Australian foreign policy was centralised around the fear of war and an eagerness to appease Germany, Japan and Italy. The Australian government gave considerable support to the appeasement policies of the Chamberlain government in London regarding Germany. However, as a consequence of supporting Chamberlain, a number of Australians experienced fear due to Japan's strong military and aggressive foreign policy whereas Australia was still an evolving nation to wield any independent force in world affairs in the 1930s.

In 1934, the Lyons government despatched the Australian Eastern Mission to East Asia and South-East Asia, Australia's first diplomatic mission outside of the British Empire. The mission visited seven territories, concentrating on China, Japan and the Dutch East Indies (present-day Indonesia), and has been identified as a milestone in the early development of Australian foreign policy. Latham publicly identified the mission as one of "friendship and goodwill", but also compiled a series of secret reports to cabinet on economic and strategic matters. He "actively sought information about trading opportunities across Asia, entering into frequent and detailed discussions with prime ministers, foreign ministers, premiers and governors about Australia‘s trading and commercial interests, custom duties and tariffs". His recommendations proved influential in the development of the Department of External Affairs as an independent department from the Prime Minister's Department and the appointment of Australia's first diplomats in Asia.

== World War II ==
At the beginning of World War II, Australia was part of the commonwealth of the British Empire, and expected the United Kingdom would guarantee its security in any conflict with Japan. On 3 September 1939, Prime Minister Robert Menzies announced, "Great Britain has declared war on Germany, and as a result, Australia is also at war... There can be no doubt that where Great Britain stands, there stand the people of the entire British world". Australia was the first nation to come to Great Britain's aid, sending its combat divisions to fight in the Middle East and North Africa.

The unprecedented Japanese attack on an American naval base at Pearl Harbor, Hawaii, on 7 December 1941, led to the formal entry of the United States into the war. Japanese attacks continued through Burma, Borneo, the Dutch East Indies (Indonesia) and Malaya. The island of Singapore was strategically crucial for the British defence plan, however it was poorly defended and surrendered to the Japanese on 15 February 1942, with thousands of Australians as prisoners of war. British prime minister Winston Churchill had given priority to the European war and was unable to assist the Australians. Australia Prime Minister John Curtin appealed to the US instead, "Australia looks to America free of any pangs as to our traditional links of kinship with Great Britain." This speech announced the shift of reliance from Great Britain to the United States.

=== Relations with the United States ===
In March 1942 after the Japanese attacks on Darwin, U.S. President Roosevelt ordered General Douglas MacArthur to move the American base from the Philippines to Brisbane, Australia. By September 1943, more than 120,000 American soldiers were in Australia. The Americans were warmly welcomed at first but tensions grew evident. MacArthur worked closely with the Australian government and took command of its combat operations. Fighting continued throughout Southeast Asia for the next two years. When the European war was declared over, Australia and the US still had a war to win against Japan. MacArthur promoted a policy of "island hopping" for his American troops while he suggested that the Australian troops should continue clearing and rounding up the Japanese from New Guinea, New Britain, Borneo and Bougainville.

== Communism and the Cold War era ==
Although the Union of Soviet Socialist Republics (USSR) and the United States co-operated during World War II, the tensions between the two superpowers over economics (Communism versus capitalism), political authority (totalitarianism versus liberalism) and the fate of Europe (East versus West) escalated into the Cold War by 1947. Australia unequivocally stood by the American side and the Cold War became the preponderant influence on Australian foreign policy.

As the international community polarised into opposing alliances led by the respective superpowers, Australia too moved to strengthen its alliance with the United States. Along with the United Kingdom and France, Australia was a main ally of the US in the Asia-Pacific region. China (after 1949), North Vietnam (after 1954) and the USSR were all in one hostile camp. China was the most worrisome. After the Chinese Communist Revolution and the North Korean infiltration of South Korea in 1950, Australia's foreign policy was influenced by growing concern over communist aggression. Australia increasingly looked to the US, as its new "great and powerful friend" for help to contain and fight communism. The Menzies government made a great effort of linking Australia to US foreign policy in the Asia-Pacific region. Two major alliance agreements were made between members of the Western Bloc in the 1950s: ANZUS, an agreement for aid in the event of an attack between Australia, New Zealand and the US and SEATO, an agreement guaranteeing defensive action in the event of an attack against the US, Australia, Great Britain, France, New Zealand, Thailand, Pakistan, the Philippines, South Korea, and South Vietnam.

=== Vietnam War ===
When communist North Vietnam infiltrated South Vietnam, the Western Bloc viewed it as a fundamental step in what could result in the communist subjugation of the democratic world. In a country gripped by this fear, the government's defence policy was dominated by the idea of "forward defence", in which Australia would seek to prevent the Communist "thrust into South-East Asia". The committal of troops to the Vietnam War was viewed as an attempt by the Menzies Government to strengthen the alliance with the USA following Great Britain's withdrawal "east of Suez".

With his arrival in October 1966, Lyndon Baines Johnson became the first US president to visit Australia. The visit came in the light of increasing international criticism over the war in Vietnam. The majority of Australians seemed to support the war, obvious from the return of the Liberal/Country Party in late 1966. A number of Australians were however protesting against the war. They wondered why we had followed the United States into a war that they thought had nothing to do with them and were concerned at our apt readiness to fall in line with American foreign policy. The slogan used by Harold Holt - "All the way with L.B.J." - directly demonstrates this partnership which perhaps could be considered rather inequitable and profitable for the US. They were tired of military solutions and "power politics", and as one Labor politician said, "tired of anti-communism as a substitute for common sense." By 1970, the anti-war sentiment in the society had exploded into huge rallies, church services and candlelight processions. The moratorium movement represented a great range of people's opinions, from young political radicals to people who would not normally challenge government decisions and from mothers of conscripted men to prominent politicians, writers, academics, artists and church leaders.

The intensity of conflict in Australia over this issue contributed to the 1972 election of the first Labor government in 23 years. The new prime minister, Gough Whitlam immediately abolished conscription and withdrew troops from Vietnam. The US signed a peace treaty for Vietnam in 1973, after withdrawing all of its troops in 1972. South Vietnam, however, was invaded and overwhelmed by North Vietnam in 1975.

=== Détente with communism ===
The Whitlam government, a new type of Labor government, developed a general opposition to the US and especially President Nixon who they viewed as especially conservative and paranoid. Whitlam announced that Australia was not automatically going to follow US defence policy any more and this annoyed the United States Government. In late 1972, when Nixon bombed North Vietnam, the controversial Tom Uren and two other left-wing politicians publicly attacked Nixon, resulting in an immediate halt in Australian/American cooperation. Instead Whitlam reached out to our geographically nearer neighbours, Asia. He eliminated the last remaining remnants of the White Australia Policy and introduced a new quota/permit system. With race no longer a barrier, substantial immigration from Asia began, especially from Vietnam. This immigration provided impetuous for the swing in Australia's foreign policy from the US to Asia and increased Australia's trade relations with Asia. In 1973, the People's Republic of China was officially recognised as the "real" China and it was realised that the move towards a more open political and trading relationship with China was a priority. Dr Stephen Fitzgerald was appointed as the first Australian ambassador to the People's Republic of China and Australian understanding and appreciation of China's history and culture was encouraged. The Whitlam government was leaving behind the racist "yellow peril" past and was poised for the move towards a multicultural Australia.

=== Foreign policy under Bob Hawke, 1983–1991 ===
==== APEC ====
One of the most significant foreign policy achievement of the government took place in 1989, after Hawke proposed a south-east Asian region-wide forum for leaders and economic ministers to discuss issues of common concern. After winning the support of key countries in the region, this led to the creation of the Asia-Pacific Economic Cooperation (APEC). The first APEC meeting duly took place in Canberra in November 1989; the economic ministers of Australia, Brunei, Canada, Indonesia, Japan, South Korea, Malaysia, New Zealand, Philippines, Singapore, Thailand and the United States all attended. APEC would subsequently grow to become one of the most pre-eminent high-level international forums in the world, particularly after the later inclusions of China and Russia, and the Keating government's later establishment of the APEC Leaders' Forum.

==== Cambodia ====
Elsewhere in Asia, the Hawke government played a significant role in the build-up to the United Nations peace process for Cambodia, culminating in the Transitional Authority; Hawke's Foreign Minister Gareth Evans was nominated for the Nobel Peace Prize for his role in negotiations. Hawke also took a major public stand in the aftermath of the Tiananmen square massacre in 1989; despite having spent years trying to get closer relations with China, Hawke gave a tearful address on national television describing the massacre in graphic detail, and unilaterally offered asylum to over 42,000 Chinese students who were living in Australia at the time, some of whom had publicly supported the Tiananmen protesters. Hawke did so without even consulting his Cabinet, stating later that he felt he simply had to act.

==== United States ====
The Hawke government pursued a close relationship with the United States, assisted by Hawke's close friendship with US secretary of state George Shultz; this led to a degree of controversy when the government supported the US's plans to test ballistic missiles off the coast of Tasmania in 1985, as well as seeking to overturn Australia's long-standing ban on uranium exports. Although the US ultimately withdrew the plans to test the missiles, the furore led to a fall in Hawke's approval ratings. Shortly after the 1990 election, Hawke would lead Australia into its first overseas military campaign since the Vietnam War, forming a close alliance with US President George H. W. Bush to join the coalition in the Gulf War. The Australian Navy contributed several destroyers and frigates to the war effort, which successfully concluded in February 1991, with the expulsion of Iraqi forces from Kuwait. The success of the campaign, and the lack of any Australian casualties, led to a brief increase in the popularity of the government.

==== Commonwealth boycott of South Africa ====
Through his role on the Commonwealth Heads of Government Meeting, Hawke played a leading role in ensuring the Commonwealth initiated an international boycott on foreign investment into South Africa, building on work undertaken by his predecessor Malcolm Fraser, and in the process clashing publicly with British Prime Minister Margaret Thatcher, who initially favoured a more cautious approach. The resulting boycott, led by the Commonwealth, was widely credited with helping bring about the collapse of apartheid, and resulted in a high-profile visit by Nelson Mandela in October 1990, months after the latter's release from a 27-year stint in prison. During the visit, Mandela publicly thanked the Hawke government for the role it played in the boycott.

=== Foreign policy under Paul Keating, 1991 to 1996 ===
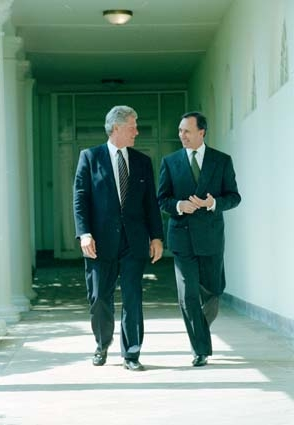
Keating with U.S. president Bill Clinton (left) in 1993.

==== Indonesia ====
Throughout his time as prime minister, Keating took a number of steps to strengthen and develop bilateral links with Australia's closest neighbours; he frequently said that there was no country in the world that was more important to Australia than Indonesia, and undertook his first overseas visit to the country, becoming the first Australian prime minister to do so. Keating made a conscious effort to develop a personal relationship with Indonesian President Suharto, and to include Indonesia in multilateral forums attended by Australia. Keating's friendship with Suharto was criticised by human rights activists supportive of East Timorese independence, and by Nobel Peace Prize winner José Ramos-Horta. The Keating government's cooperation with the Indonesian military, and the signing of the Timor Gap Treaty, were also strongly criticised by these same groups. It was alleged by some that Keating was overlooking alleged human rights abuses by the Indonesian government as part of his effort to dramatically increase Australia's cultural, diplomatic and economic ties with Asia.

==== APEC ====
Following the creation of the Asia-Pacific Economic Cooperation (APEC) Economic Forum by Bob Hawke, Keating developed the idea further, winning the support in 1993 of recently elected US president Bill Clinton and Chinese premier Li Peng to expand APEC to a full Leaders' Meeting. This led to APEC becoming one of the most significant high-level international summits, and at the 1994 APEC Leaders' Meeting, hosted by Indonesia, members agreed to the Keating government's proposals for what became known as the Bogor Declaration, which set targets for a significant increase in free trade and investment between industrialised APEC countries by 2010 and between developing APEC countries by 2020. In December 1993, Keating became involved in a diplomatic incident with Malaysia when he described Prime Minister Mahathir Mohamad as "recalcitrant". The incident occurred after Mahathir refused to attend the 1993 APEC summit. Keating said, "APEC is bigger than all of us – Australia, the U.S. and Malaysia, and Dr. Mahathir and any other recalcitrants." The translation of the word "recalcitrant" into Malaysian rendered the word a more egregious insult, and Mahathir demanded an apology from Keating, threatening to reduce diplomatic ties and trade drastically with Australia, which became an enormous concern to Australian exporters. Some Malaysian officials talked of launching a "Buy Australian Last" campaign; Keating subsequently apologised to Mahathir over the remark.

=== Foreign policy under John Howard, 1996 to 2007 ===
==== East Timor ====
Although new Indonesian President B.J. Habibie had some months earlier agreed to grant special autonomy to Indonesian-occupied East Timor, his subsequent snap decision for a referendum on the territory's independence triggered a Howard and Downer orchestrated shift in Australian policy. In September 1999, Howard organised an Australian-led international peace-keeping force to East Timor (INTERFET), after pro-Indonesia militia launched a violent "scorched-earth" campaign in retaliation to the referendum's overwhelming vote in favour of independence. The successful mission was widely supported by Australian voters, but the government was criticised for "foreign policy failure" following the violence and collapse of diplomatic relations with Indonesia. By Howard's fourth term, relations with Indonesia had recovered to include counter-terrorism cooperation and Australia's $1bn Boxing Day Tsunami relief efforts, and were assisted by good relations between Howard and Indonesian President Susilo Bambang Yudhoyono.

==== War in Afghanistan ====
Howard had first met US president George W. Bush in the days before the 11 September terrorist attacks and was in Washington the morning of the attacks. In response to the attacks, Howard invoked the ANZUS Treaty. In October 2001, he committed Australian military personnel to the War in Afghanistan despite widespread opposition. Howard developed a strong personal relationship with the President, and they shared often similar ideological positions – including on the role of the United States in world affairs and their approach to the "war on terror". In May 2003, Howard made an overnight stay at Bush's Prairie Chapel Ranch in Texas, after which Bush said that Howard "...is not only a man of steel, he's showed the world he's a man of heart."

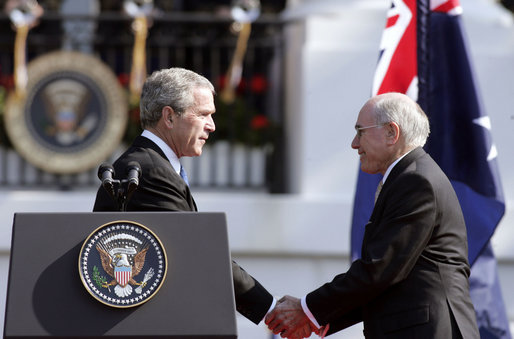
Howard maintained a strong friendship with US President George W. Bush

In April 2002, Howard was the first Australian prime minister to attend a royal funeral, that of Queen Elizabeth The Queen Mother. In October Howard responded to the 2002 Bali bombing with calls for solidarity. Howard re-dedicated his government to the "war on terror".

==== War in Iraq ====
In March 2003, Australia joined the US-led "Multinational force in Iraq" in sending 2,000 troops and naval units to support in the invasion of Iraq. In response to the Australian participation in the invasion, there were large protests in Australian cities during March 2003, and Prime Minister Howard was heckled from the public gallery of Parliament House. While opinion polls showed that opposition to the war without UN backing was between 48 and 92 per cent, Howard remained preferred prime-minister over the leader of the opposition, Simon Crean, although his approval ratings were lower compared to before the war.

=== Multiculturalism and the end of ‘white Australia’ ===
This focus of multiculturalism and a focus on Asia in Australia foreign policy was not lost because of the dismissal of the Whitlam government in 1975; contact and understanding continued to grow during the following decade. Australia’s imports of major weapons increased 65 per cent between 2005–2009 and 2010–14, making it the sixth largest importer in the world according to SIPRI.

=== China ===
Relationships with China continued to improve until the Chinese government massacred thousands of students in the Tiananmen Square Protests of 1989. Along with other nations, Australia ceased diplomatic and trade relations with China for the next two years.

Relations between the two countries began to deteriorate in 2018 due to growing Australian concerns regarding Chinese political influence in various sectors of Australian society including Chinese students and residents, the national and state governments, universities and the media. There is sharp criticism regarding China's human rights policies regarding the treatment of Hong Kong and the Uyghur minority. Furthermore Canberra has been troubled by China's aggressive stance on the South China Sea dispute. The COVID-19 pandemic has exacerbated tensions after Australia called for an international, independent inquiry into the origins of the disease. The subsequent restrictions that China made to its trade policies have been attacked as political retaliation and economic coercion against Australia. In 2021 Canberra disallowed the effort by the state of Victoria to join China's vast Belt and Road Initiative as a potential threat to Australia's security.

=== Indonesia ===
Australia had a developing relationship was Indonesia. Whitlam did not object to the invasion of Portuguese Timor by Indonesian troops in 1975 because maintaining good diplomatic relations with Indonesia was considered the highest priority at the time. The government could only express regret for the Timorese people as they were not prepared to go to war. Hawke and especially Keating also supported Indonesia despite their continuing maltreatment of the East Timorese people. When John Howard was elected in 1996, he saw the opportunity to distinguish himself from the previous Labor approach to the East Timor conflict. Immediately he sent peacekeeping forces into East Timor and advocated Australia's support for their independence. The role of this support of an essentially Christian country against a Muslim nation was detrimental to Australia's reputation with other Muslim countries.

=== Vietnam ===
Since the 1970s (when Vietnamese boat people started coming), wave after wave of refugees from distressed countries in Asia and elsewhere have sought haven in Australia. Some have died making the hazardous journey. How to deal with them has been a contentious political issue.

== See also ==
- Peace movements in Australia

== See also ==
- Basic Treaty of Friendship and Cooperation, with Japan
- Canberra Pact, called ANZAC Pact
- Colombo Plan
- Pacific class patrol boat
- Petrov Affair
