= Royal Exhibition Building =

Heritage building in Melbourne, Victoria, Australia

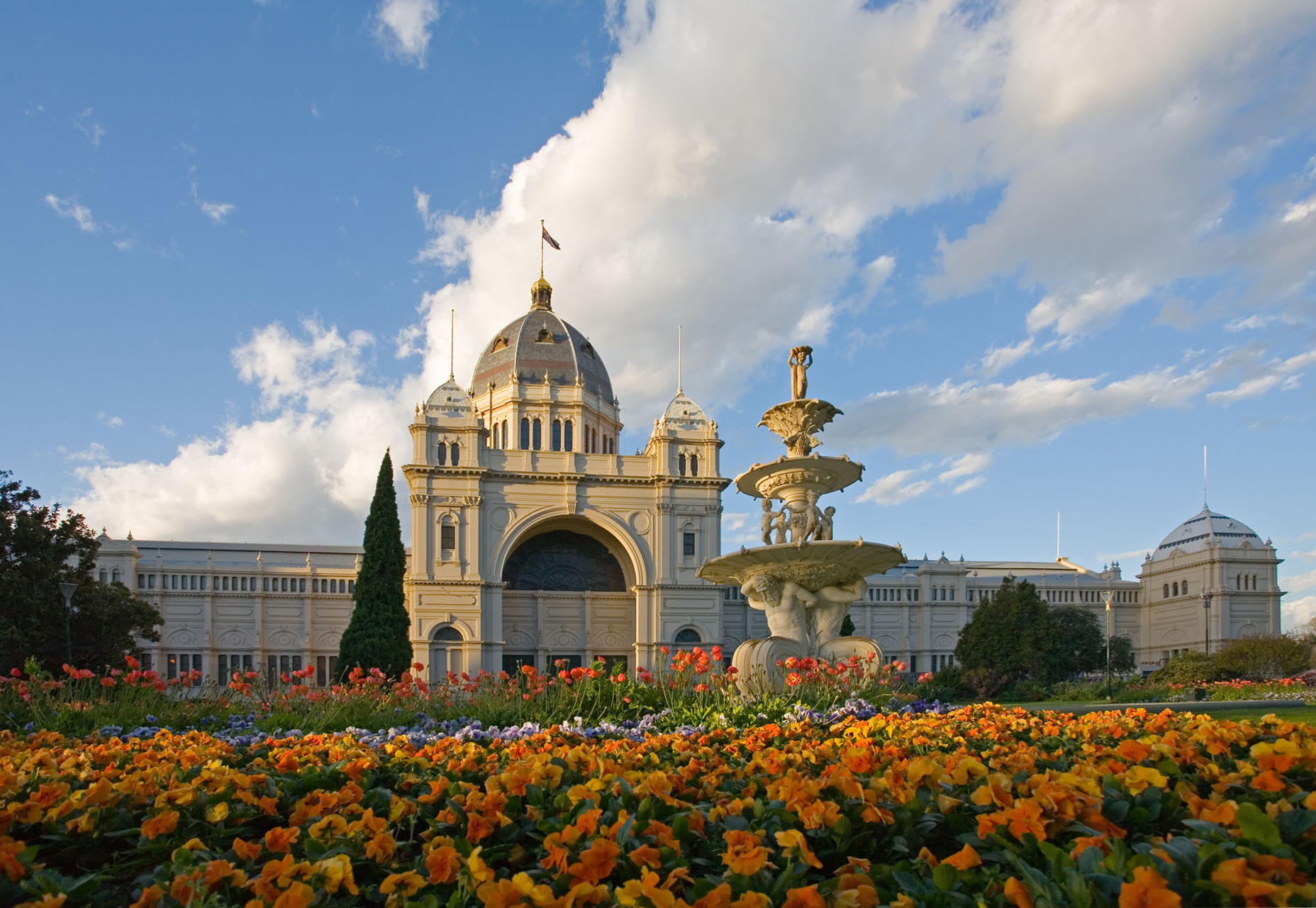
- The Royal Exhibition Building, with its fountain on the southern or Carlton Gardens side

General information
- Status: Completed
- Location: 9 Nicholson Street, Carlton, Victoria, Australia
- Coordinates: 37°48′17″S 144°58′17″E
- Elevation: 61 m (200 ft)
- Construction started: 1879; 147 years ago
- Completed: 1880; 146 years ago
- Owner: Government of Victoria

Design and construction
- Architect: Joseph Reed

Other information
- Public transit: Melbourne Museum/Nicholson St (#11): 86, 96; Bus routes 250, 251, 402

Website
- museumsvictoria.com.au/reb/

UNESCO World Heritage Site
- Official name: Royal Exhibition Building and Carlton Gardens
- Type: Cultural
- Criteria: ii
- Designated: 2004 (28th session)
- Reference no.: 1131
- Region: Asia-Pacific

Australian National Heritage List
- Type: Historic
- Criteria: a, b, d, e, f, g
- Designated: 20 July 2004; 22 years ago
- Reference no.: 105708

Victorian Heritage Register
- Type: Community Facilities
- Criteria: a, b, c, d, e, g
- Designated: 21 March 1982; 44 years ago
- Reference no.: VHR H1501
- Heritage Overlay Number: HO69

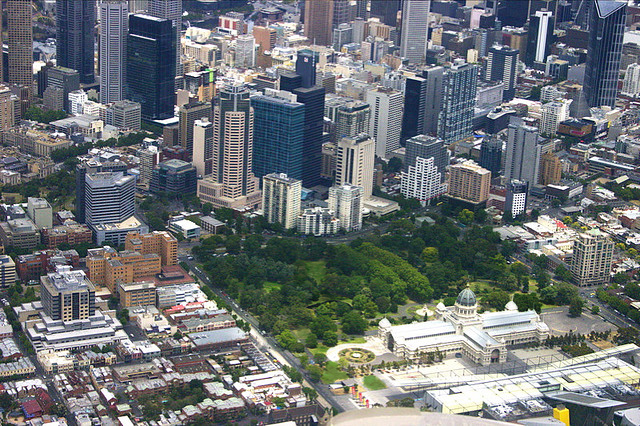
Aerial view of the Carlton Gardens, where the building is located

The Royal Exhibition Building is a UNESCO World Heritage-listed building in Melbourne, Victoria, Australia, built in 1879–1880 as part of the international exhibition movement, which presented over 50 exhibitions between 1851 and 1915 around the globe. The building sits on approximately 26 hectares (64 acres), is 150 metres (490 ft) long and is surrounded by four city streets. It is situated at 9 Nicholson Street in the Carlton Gardens, flanked by Victoria, Carlton and Rathdowne Streets, at the north-eastern edge of the central business district. It was built to host the Melbourne International Exhibition in 1880–81, and then hosted the even larger Centennial International Exhibition in 1888. It was then chosen as the site for the Federation of the Commonwealth of Australia in 1901. The building is representative of the financial wealth and pride that the city of Melbourne and state of Victoria had in the 1870s. Throughout the 20th century smaller sections and wings of the building were subject to demolition and fire; however, the main building, known as the Great Hall, survived.

On 1 October 1980, it was announced that Queen Elizabeth II had conferred the title of "Royal" to the Exhibition Building. It received restoration throughout the 1990s and in 2004 became the first building in Australia to be awarded UNESCO World Heritage status, being one of the last remaining major 19th-century exhibition buildings in the world. It is the world's most complete surviving site from the International Exhibition movement 1851–1914. It sits adjacent to the Melbourne Museum and is the largest item in Museum Victoria's collection. Today, the building hosts various exhibitions and other events and is closely tied with events at the Melbourne Museum.

== History ==
=== Background ===
The city's first exhibition building was erected in 1854, inspired by The Crystal Palace the "grand glass exhibition hall" was on the site of the Melbourne Mint at the corner of William and Little Lonsdale Streets which hosted the Melbourne Exhibition of 1854. It was demolished in 1869 after going into disrepair, paving the way for a much bigger building. The current building was first proposed in November 1877 when a committee was appointed to prepare a bid to the international exhibition committee by 1879. The original site was proposed to be Flinders Park however a rival proposal to situate it at Carlton Gardens quickly gathered momentum. Flinders Park was seen as having the logistical benefit of rail transport links, in particular Princes Bridge railway station and a possible additional dedicated station on what became Jolimont Yard while the gardens were seen as an opportunity to improve the park's amenity and the ideal position for a new landmark within walking distance to the majority of the local residents. A budget of £100,000 for its construction was proposed. The site was formally announced as Carlton Gardens on 27 June 1878. A mooted rail connection to the site down Nicholson Street did not eventuate.

=== Design ===
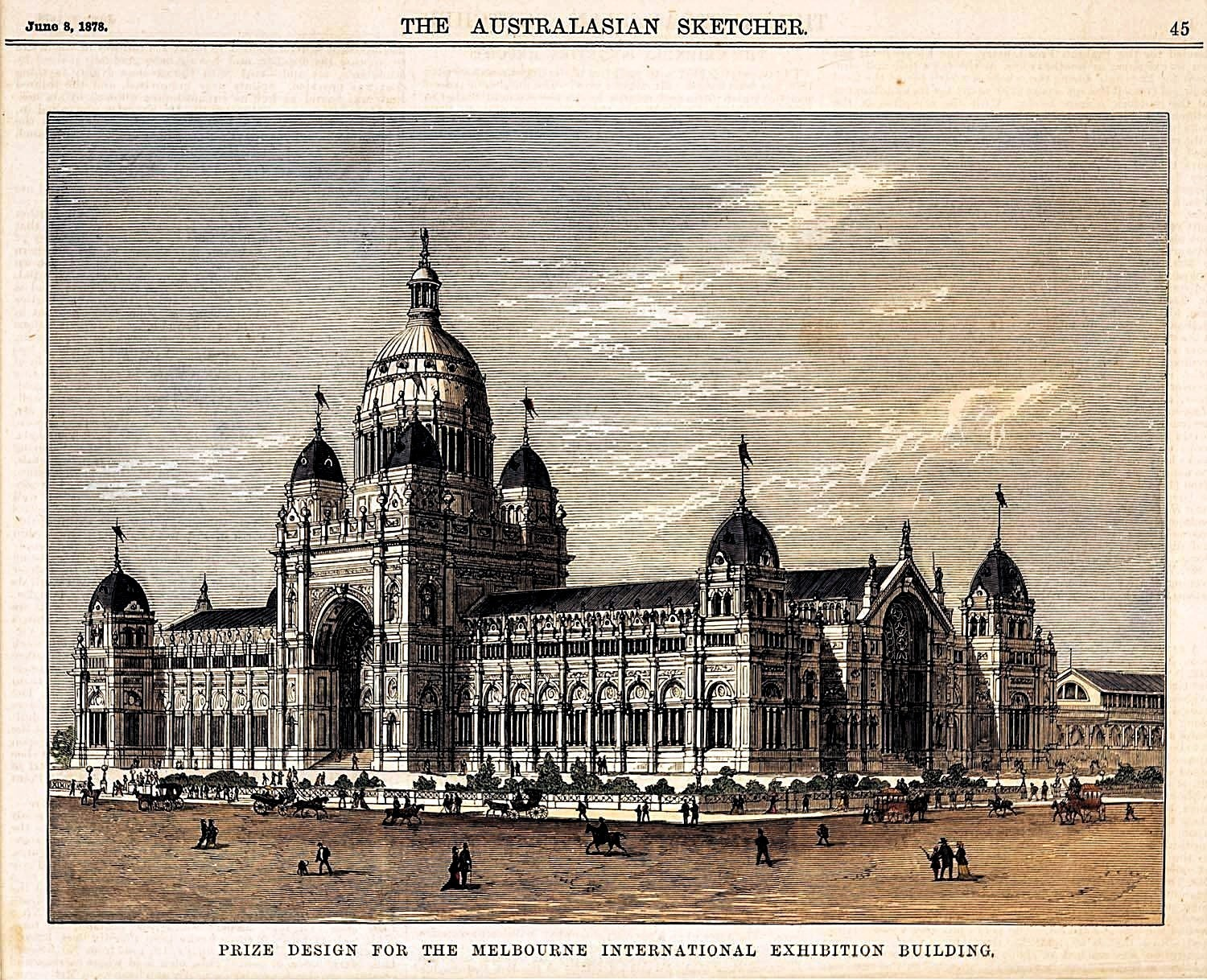
Prize Design for the Melbourne International Exhibition Building. 1878

The New Exhibition Bill (1878) passed by parliament paved the way for £210,000 in government funding, more than double the original budget for the building, with a public competition held in May of that year. Eighteen entries were made with the winner, celebrated local architect Joseph Reed, receiving first prize of £300. Second was Lloyd Tayler, with a similarly domed neoclassical design, was awarded £200 and was appointed exhibition commissioner, with third place going to Peter Matthews who received £100.

Reed was a prolific practitioner working in the Reed and Barnes partnership also designing the Melbourne Town Hall, the State Library of Victoria, and the Baroque style gardens. The Royal Exhibition Building was the largest design completed by Reed and Barnes. According to Reed, the eclectic design was inspired by many sources. Composed of brick, timber, steel, and slate, the Exhibition Building is representative of the Byzantine, Romanesque, Lombardic and Italian Renaissance styles. The dome was modeled on the Florence Cathedral, while the main pavilions were influenced by the style of Rundbogenstil and several buildings from Normandy, Caen and Paris. The building has the scale of the French Beaux Arts, with a cruciform plan in the shape of a Latin cross, with long nave-like wings symmetrically placed east–west about the central dome, and a shorter wing to the north. The Great Hall was to be crowned by an octagonal drum and dome rising 68 metres, and 18.3 metres across formed using cast iron and timber frame and has a double shell. At the crossing, windows in the drum of the dome were designed to bring in sunlight for a bright open space. The interior designed called for murals and the words "Victoria Welcomes All Nations" under the dome.

=== Construction ===
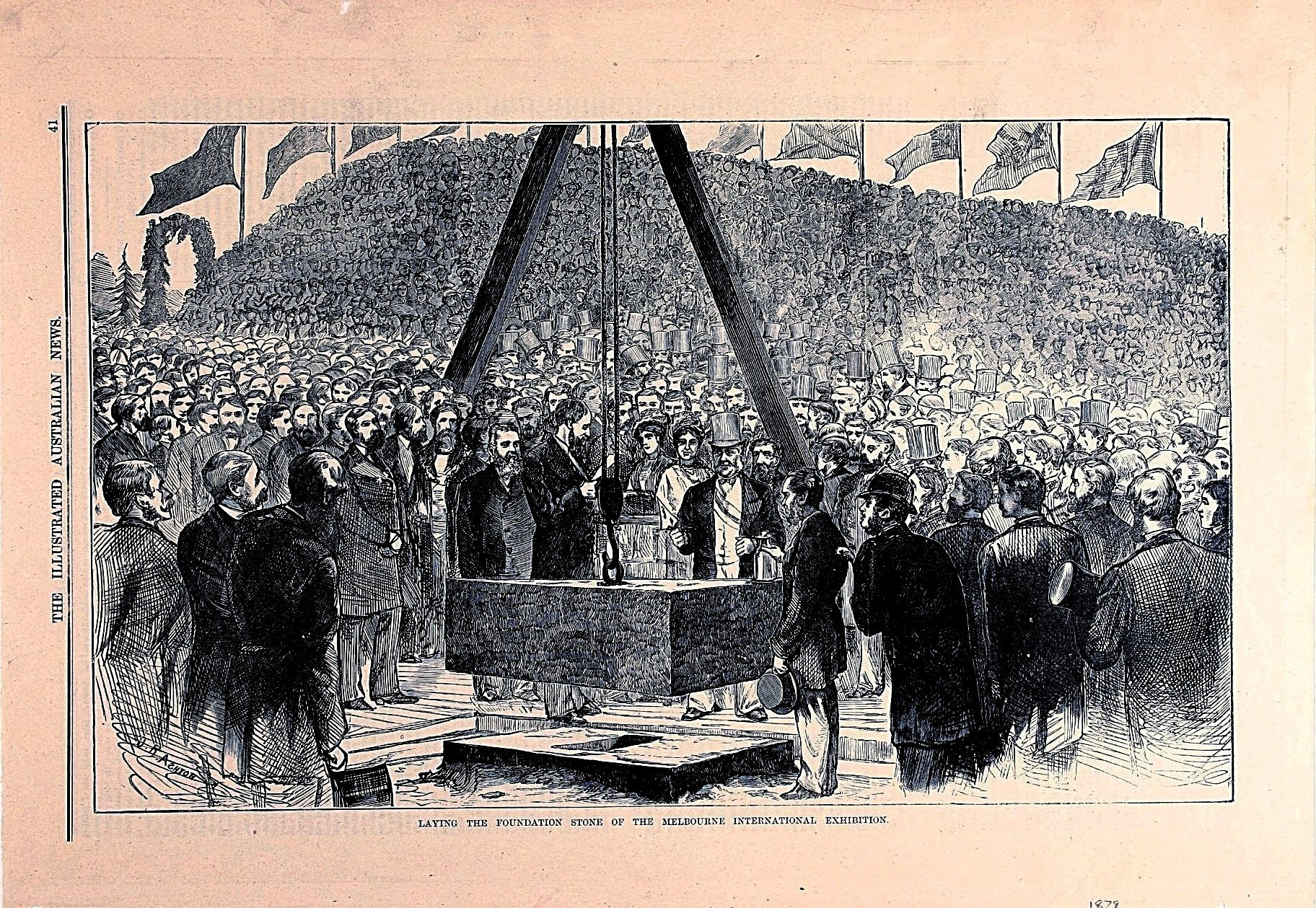
The laying of the foundation stone on 19 February 1879

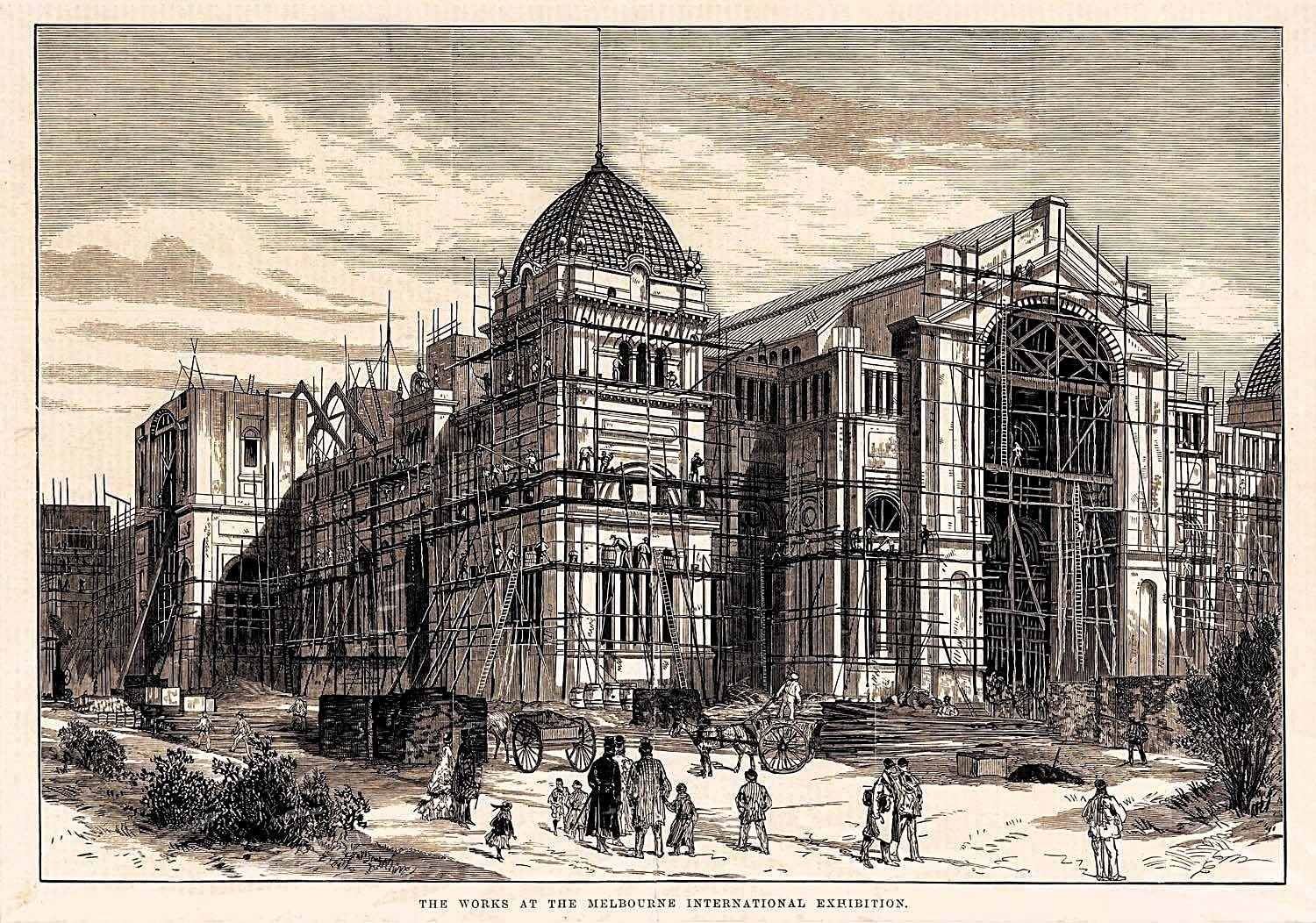
Construction progress in August 1879

Tenders were called for its construction on 2 December 1878. David Mitchell, who also built Scots' Church and St Patrick's Cathedral was the contractor. Mitchell was a member of the Council of the Royal Agricultural society and also the Builders and Contractor's association.

The foundation stone was laid by Victorian governor George Bowen on 19 February 1879 and it was completed in just 18 months, opening on 1 October 1880, as the Melbourne International Exhibition. The building consisted of a Great Hall of over 12,000 square metres, flanking lower annexes to the north on the east and west sides, and many temporary galleries between.

=== Opening, Centennial International Exhibition (1880) and Melbourne Centennial Exhibition (1888) ===
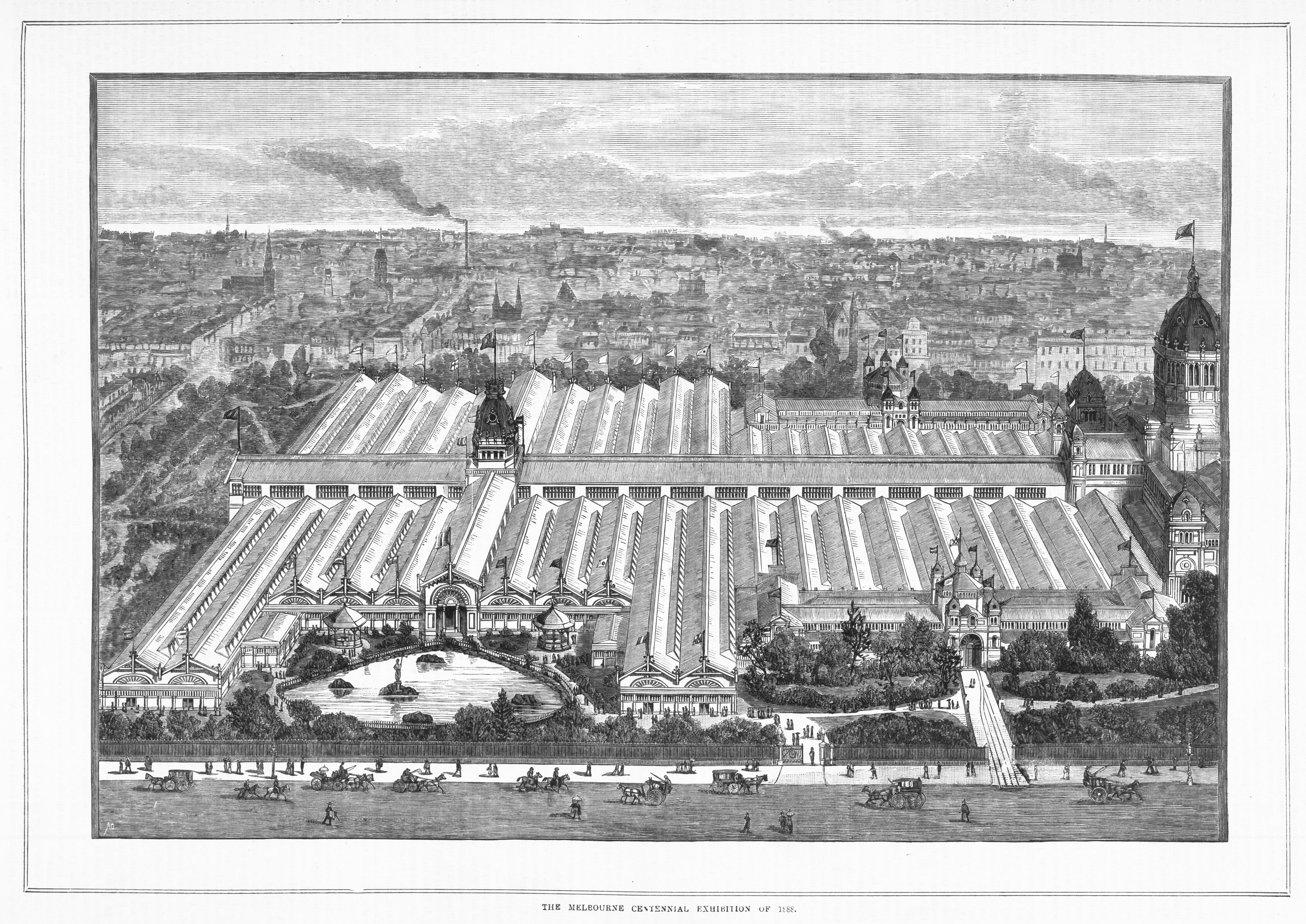
Lithograph of the building during the Centennial International Exhibition in 1880 showing the extent of the eastern and western annexes to the rear which no longer exist.

During the 1880s, the building hosted two major International Exhibitions: The Melbourne International Exhibition in 1880 and the Melbourne Centennial Exhibition in 1888, celebrating a century of European settlement in Australia.

In 1888, electric lighting was installed for the Centennial International Exhibition, making it one of the first in the world that was accessible during night time. The interior decorations changed between the two exhibitions of 1880 and 1888. In 1880, the walls were left bare and windows and door joinery coloured green. In 1888, walls were painted for the first time. The decoration was by interior designer John Ross Anderson.

=== Temporary seat of government ===
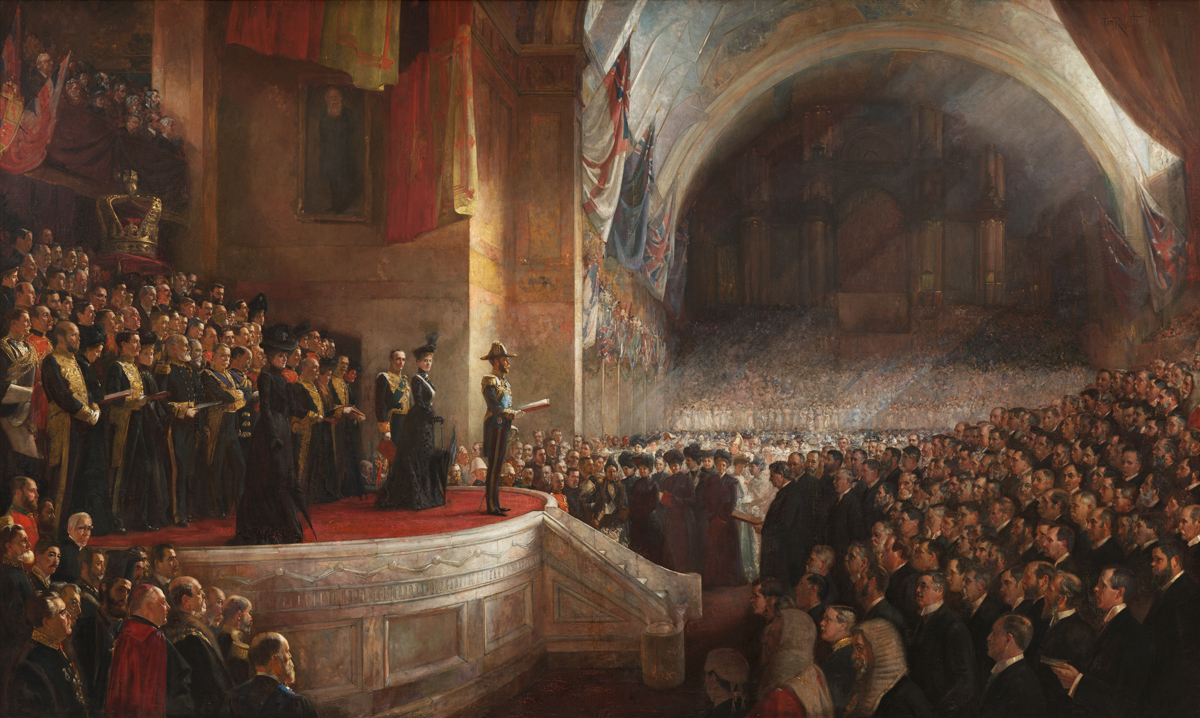
The Big Picture, opening of the Parliament of Australia, 9 May 1901, by Tom Roberts

The most significant event to occur in the Exhibition Building was the opening of the first Parliament of Australia on 9 May 1901, following the inauguration of the Commonwealth of Australia on 1 January. After the official opening, the Federal Parliament moved to the Victorian State Parliament House, while the Victorian Parliament moved to the Exhibition Building for the next 26 years.

The interior was repainted at this time and this scheme survives today.

On 3 September 1901, the Countess of Hopetoun, wife of the Governor-General, announced the winners of a competition to design the Australian National Flag. A large flag, 5.5 metres by 11 metres, was unfurled and flown over the dome.

The building continued to function as an general use exhibition space and in 1902, hosted the Australian Federal International Exhibition and in 1907 the Australian Exhibition of Women's Work. During the 1919 Spanish flu epidemic, it was used as an influenza hospital.

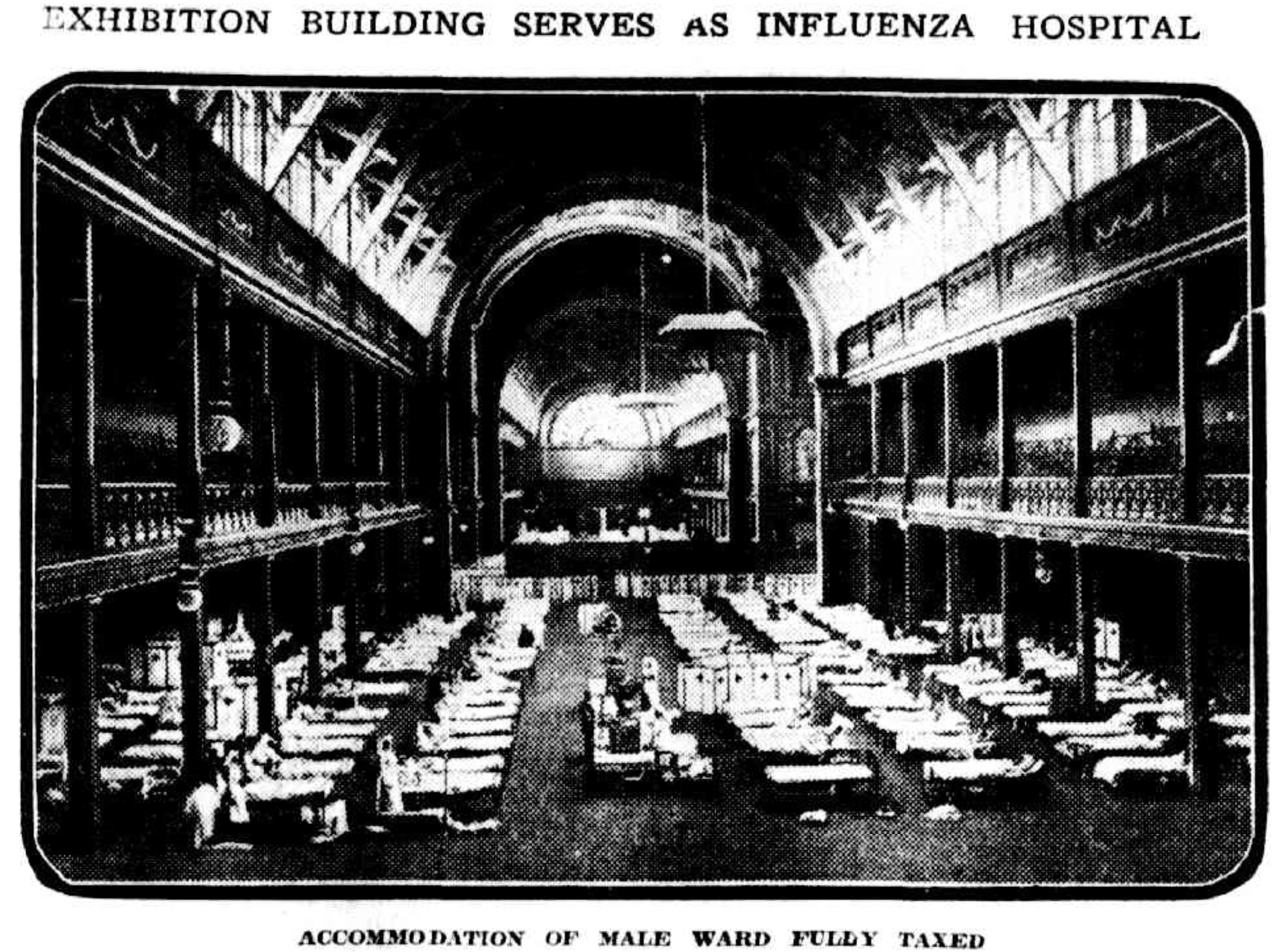
The building served as a hospital during the Spanish flu pandemic, 1919

Following their use as exhibition space, the rear annexes of the building were seen as a blight by many and the Victorian cabinet was not willing to budget adequate funds to rebuild in the event of a disaster.

=== 1927–1979 "White Elephant" period and decades of decay ===
The building was left vacant in 1927 by the Victorian government as it returned to parliament house when the federal government relocated to Canberra for the opening of the parliament building in Canberra.

As it decayed, it became known derogatively by locals as The White Elephant in the 1940s and by the 1950s, like many buildings in Melbourne of that time it was earmarked for replacement by office blocks. In 1948, members of the Melbourne City Council put this to the vote and it was narrowly decided not to demolish the building.

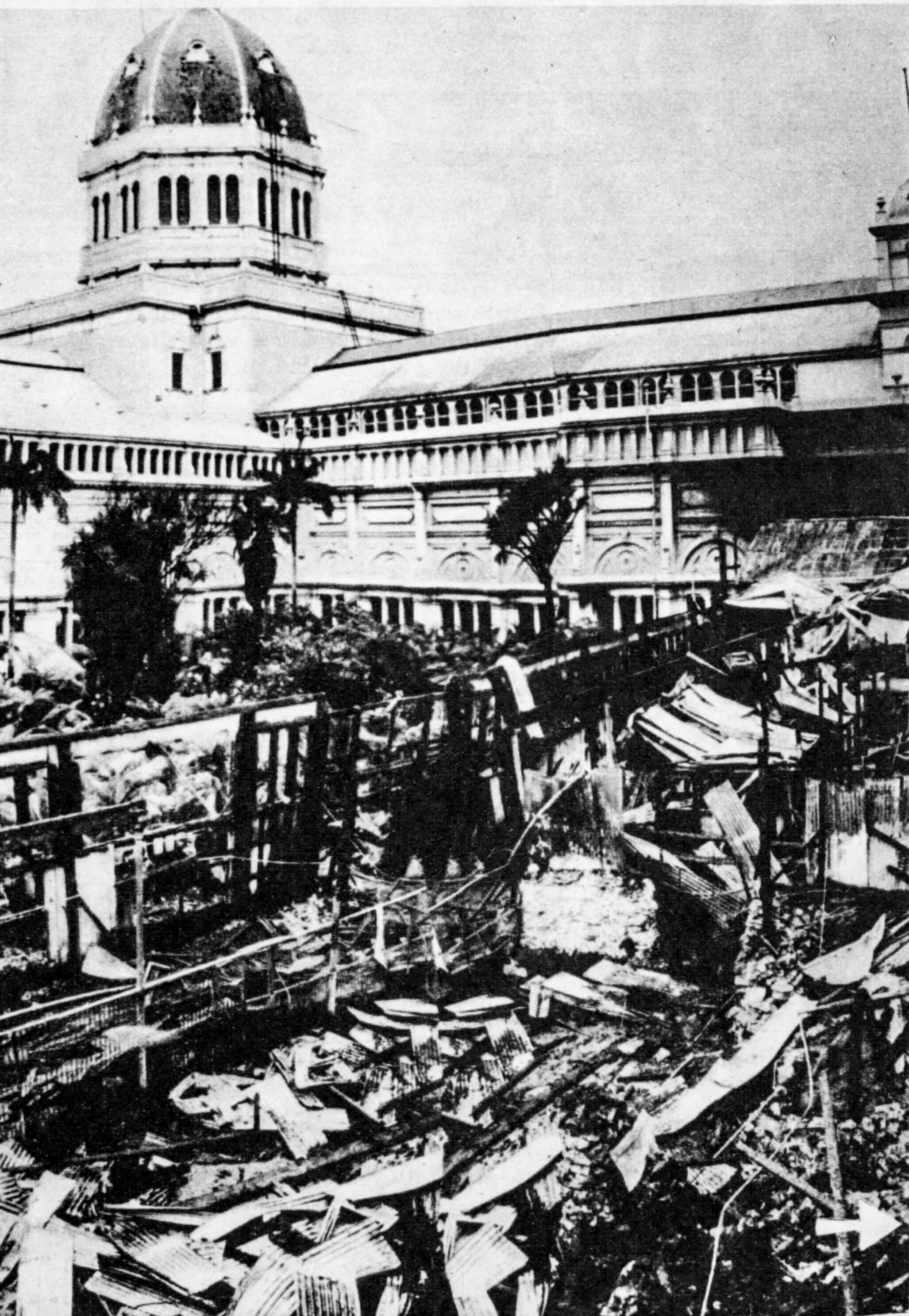
Ruins of the Aquarium in the eastern annexe after the 1953 fire

The wing of the building which once housed Melbourne Aquarium burnt down in 1953. It was a venue for the 1956 Summer Olympics, hosting the basketball, weightlifting, wrestling, and the fencing part of the modern pentathlon competitions. During the 1940s and 1950s, the building remained a venue for regular weekly dances. Over some decades of this period it also held boat shows, car shows and other regular home and building industry shows. It was also used during the 1950s, 1960s and 1970s for State High School Matriculation and for the Victorian Certificate of Education examinations, among its various other purposes. The western annexe was demolished in the 1970s. The last remaining original annex, the grand ballroom, was demolished amid controversy in 1979.

=== 1980–2003 Royal status and preservation ===
The grand ballroom was replaced with a new building on the same footprint providing more exhibition space, clad in mirror glass, in 1980. On 1 October 1980 during a visit to Victoria, Princess Alexandra unveiled a plaque which commemorated both the opening of the new mirror-glass "Centennial Hall", and the centenary of the building. She also unveiled a second plaque commemorating the bestowal of the title "Royal" on the building by the Queen.

Following the outcry over the ballroom demolition, and the appointment of new Trustees and a new chair in 1983, the heritage of the building began to be seen as important as providing modern space for exhibitions.

The first conservation assessment of the building was undertaken by Alan Willingham in 1987, and over the following decades the Great hall was progressively renovated and restored. In 1996, the then Premier of Victoria, Jeff Kennett, proposed the location and construction of Melbourne's State Museum in the carpark to the north, which involved the demolition of the 1960s annexes in 1997–98.

The biennial Melbourne Art Fair took place at the Royal Exhibition Building from 1988 to 2014.

The location of the Melbourne Museum close to the Exhibition Building site was strongly opposed by the Victorian State Labor Party, the Melbourne City Council and some in the local community. Due to the community campaign opposing the museum development, John Brumby, then State opposition leader, with the support of the Melbourne City Council, proposed the nomination of the Royal Exhibition Building for world heritage listing. The world heritage nomination did not progress until the election of the Victorian State Labor Party as the new government in 1999.

On 9 May 2001, the Royal Exhibition Building hosted a special joint sitting of the Australian Parliament. This was held in the same site as the opening of the first Parliament of Australia exactly 100 years earlier. This event commemorated the Centenary of that event specifically, and the Centenary of Federation more generally. The joint sitting was addressed by the Governor-General, Sir William Deane. A painting by artist Robert Hannaford was commissioned to capture this 2001 event, with his artwork echoing Tom Roberts' Big Picture that captured the 1901 opening.

=== 2004 World Heritage Status ===
The year 2004 was a turning point in the legacy of the Royal Exhibition Building. On 1 July 2004, it became the first Australian building to be listed as a World Heritage Site by UNESCO, alongside its surrounding Carlton Gardens. The listing recognised the site's Outstanding Universal Value as one of the very few surviving 19th-century international exhibition precincts anywhere in the world that remains substantially intact. UNESCO highlighted that the Royal Exhibition Building is:

"the only major extant nineteenth-century exhibition building in Australia, and one of the few remaining worldwide"

This formal recognition placed the site among the world's great cultural landmarks and strengthened national efforts to conserve it. The listing also included the Carlton Gardens, which had been an essential part of the original exhibition site, featuring Victorian-era landscape design, fountains, ornamental garden beds, tree-lined avenues, and surviving infrastructure like bluestone plinths and paths. Following the listing, all levels of government collaborated to implement a World Heritage Management Plan, and a designated World Heritage Environs Area (WHEA) was established as a buffer zone to control development around the site. In the same year, Museum Victoria launched a project to restore the Western Forecourt, where the German Garden, once part of the original 1880 landscape, had been buried under bitumen and used as a carpark since the 1950s. The initiative restored historical symmetry and further reinforced the authenticity of the site.

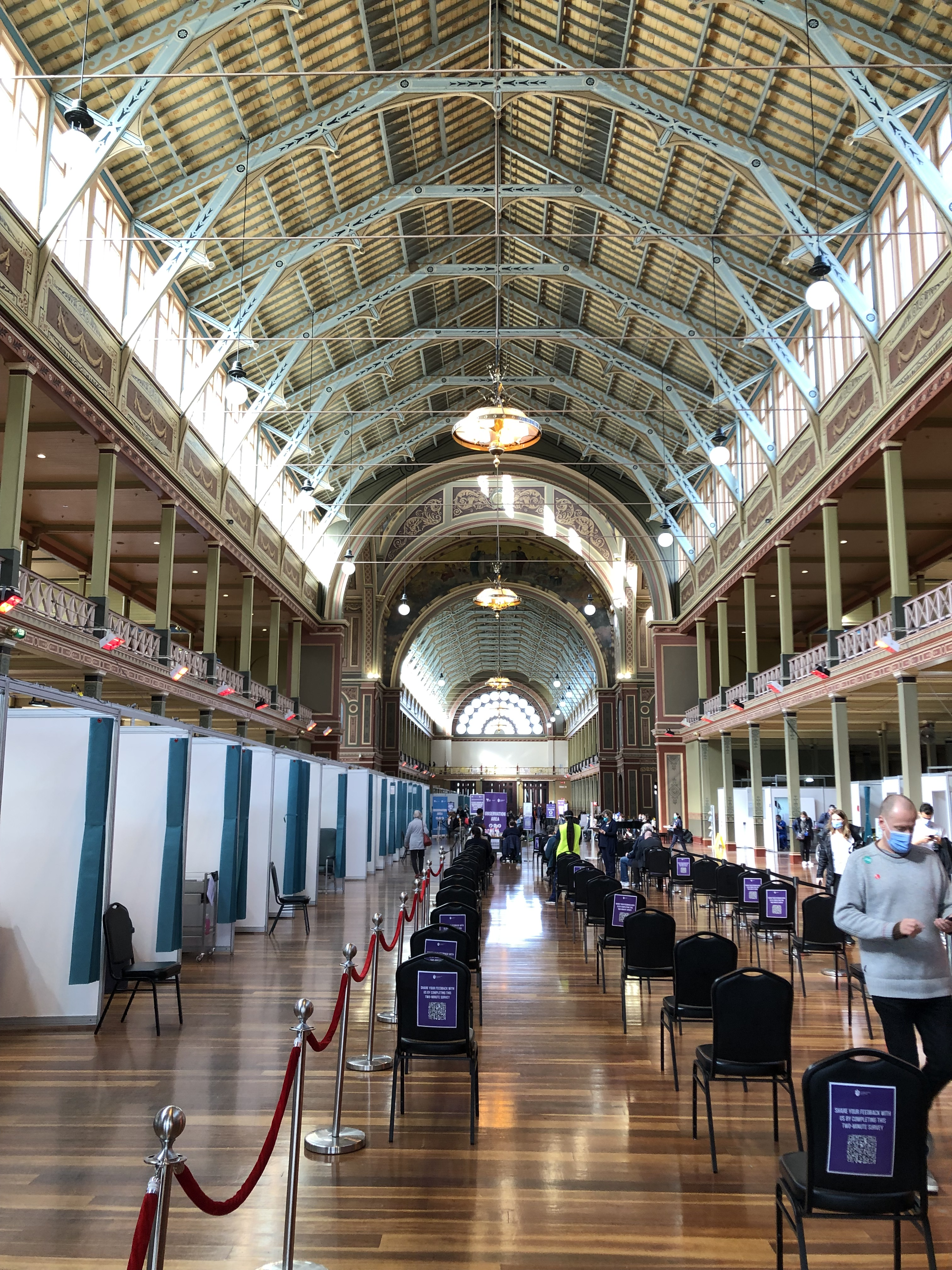
The Royal Exhibition Building in use as a mass vaccination centre during the COVID-19 pandemic

=== 2005 - Present ===
In October 2009, Museum Victoria embarked upon a major project to restore the former German Garden of the Western Forecourt. The area had been covered by asphalt in the 1950s for car parking. In 2018, The Australian Government granted $20 million for heritage restoration works to protect and promote the Royal Exhibition Building. The Australian Department of Environment and Energy, along with Heritage Victoria, Creative Victoria and Museums Victoria oversaw the various internal and external projects that were all completed by 2022. Externally, sections of the facade underwent conservation works. Internally, renovations included restoring the timber flooring and some old staircases, which were replaced by much safer stairs made from concrete and steel. The basement also underwent restoration works and has now been turned into a curatorial exhibition space with various items on display telling the history of the Royal Exhibition Building and Melbourne. Due to the buildings age, heritage experts suggest further restoration works to the building are needed, both internally and externally. The works are predicted to cost around $50 million. As of September 2024, no further funding has been allocated by the Australian Government or Victorian Government.

The Dome Promenade at the Royal Exhibition Building has a rich history as one of Melbourne's most iconic tourist attractions. During the late 1800s, it was the go-to spot for visitors seeking panoramic views of the growing city and its new suburbs as there were very few other tall buildings to block the sweeping vistas in all directions. The promenade was particularly popular during the Melbourne International Exhibitions of 1880 and 1888. For the 1888 Exhibition, over 100,000 people paid to enjoy the views. The promenade remained a central feature of Melbourne life until it was closed in the 1920s for structural repairs, which never eventuated. After being closed for nearly a century, the Dome Promenade was officially reopened on 28 October 2022, as part of the $20 million heritage restoration works to the building. The first tour of the reopened Dome Promenade, available to the public ran on 29 October 2022. Museums Victoria are the custodians of the Royal Exhibition Building. Daily tours of the Dome Promenade can be booked on their website or at Melbourne Museum.

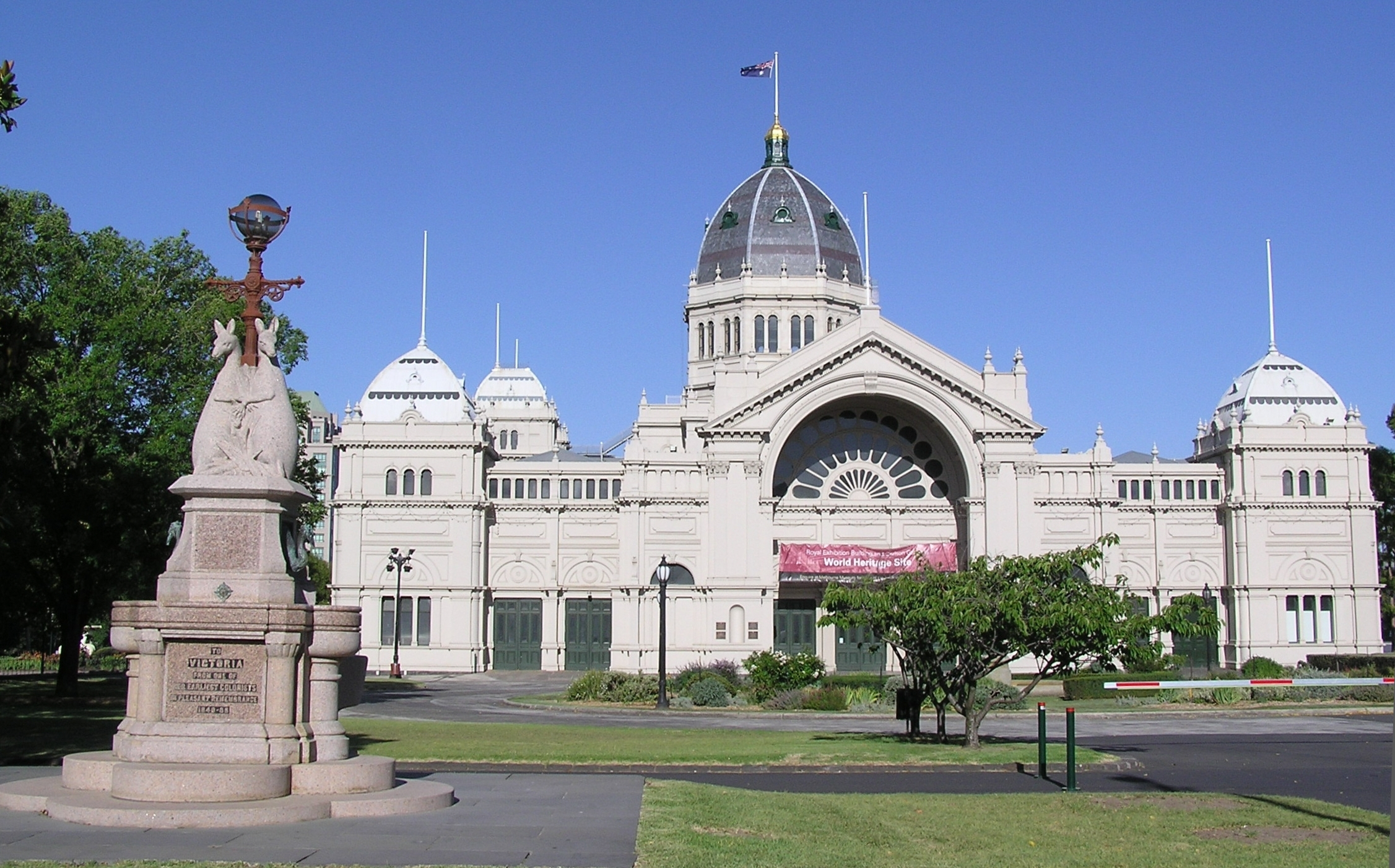
Melbourne Royal Exhibition Building (east side)

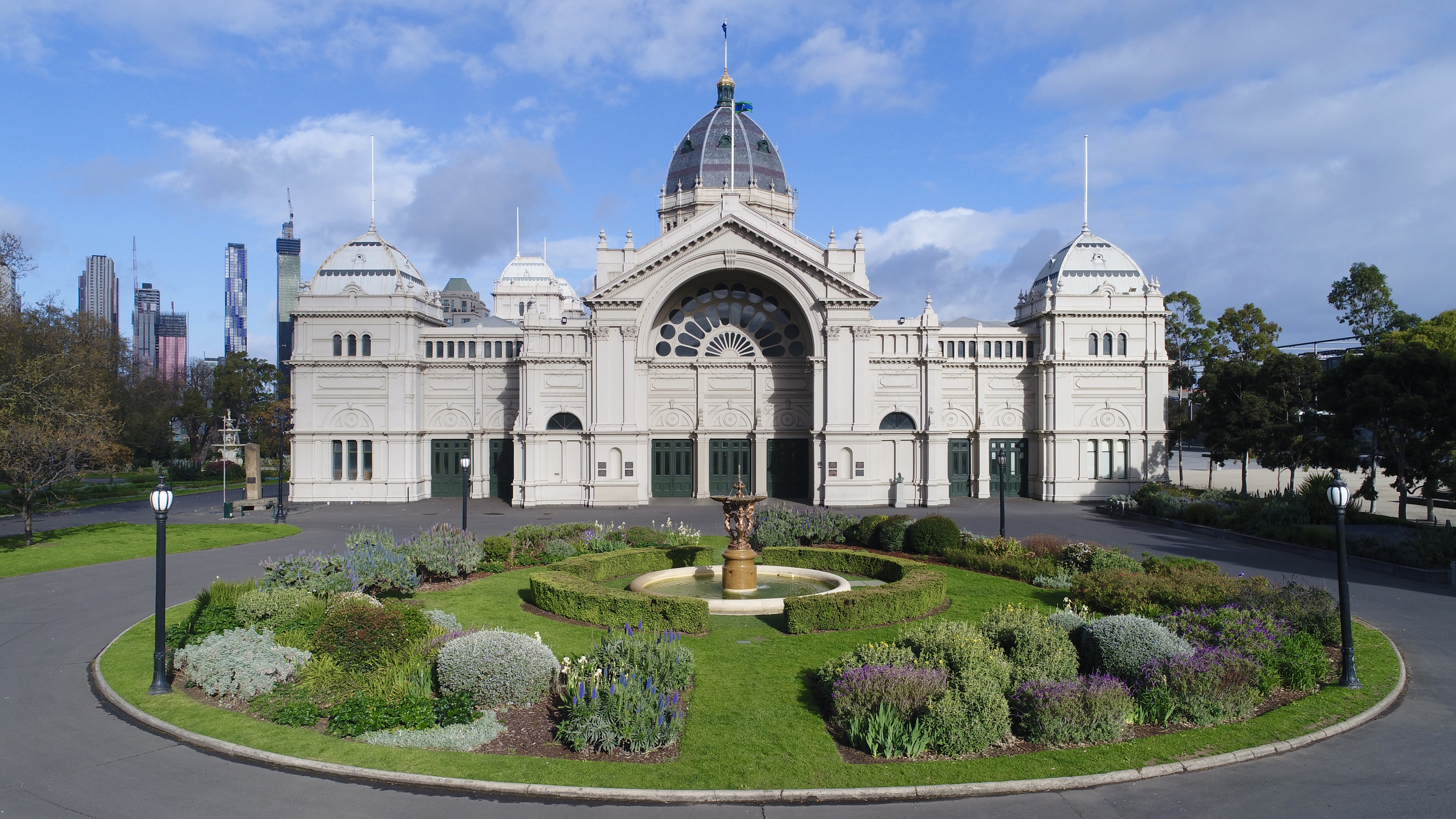
East side, straight view

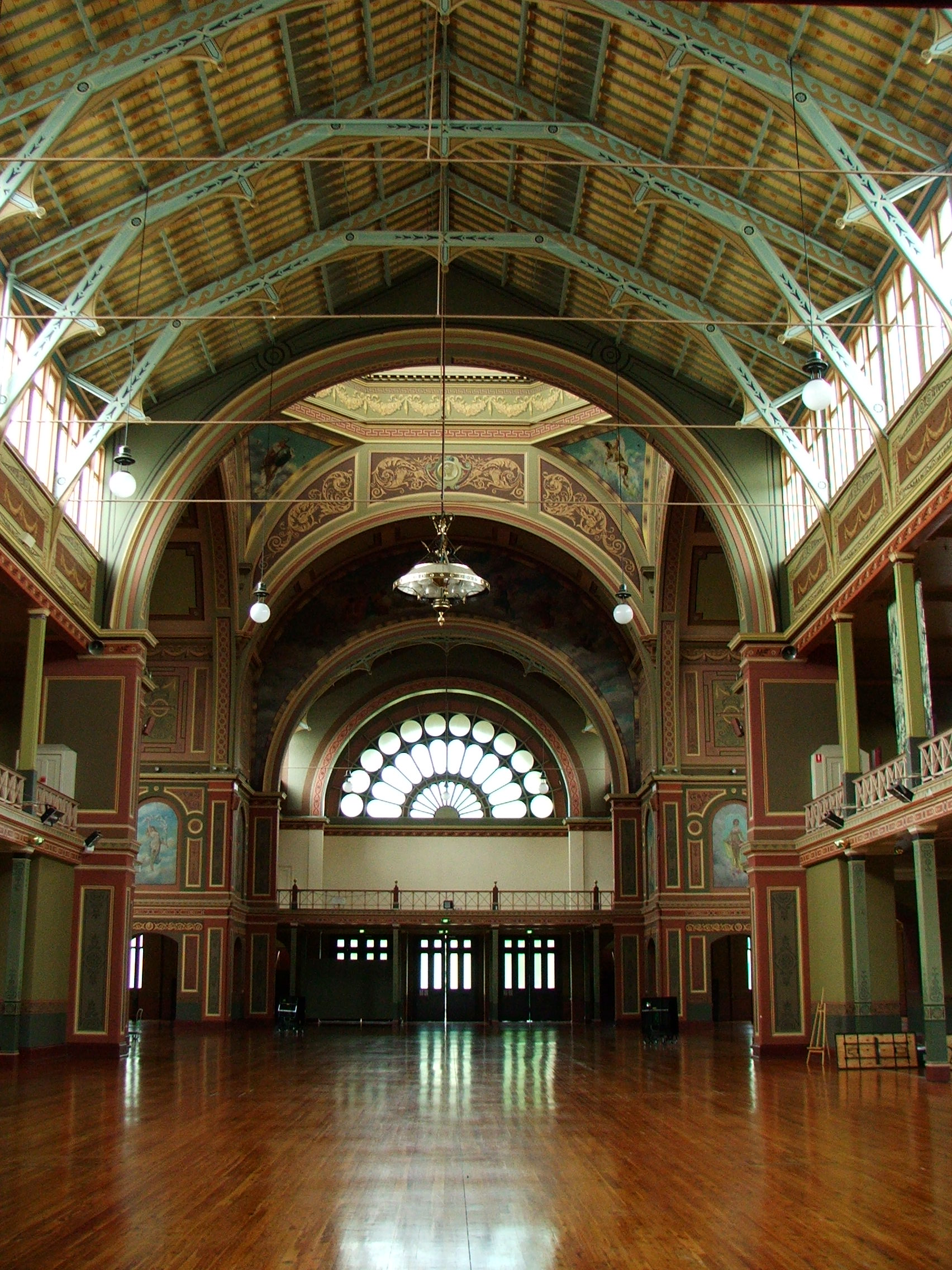
The main hall inside the building

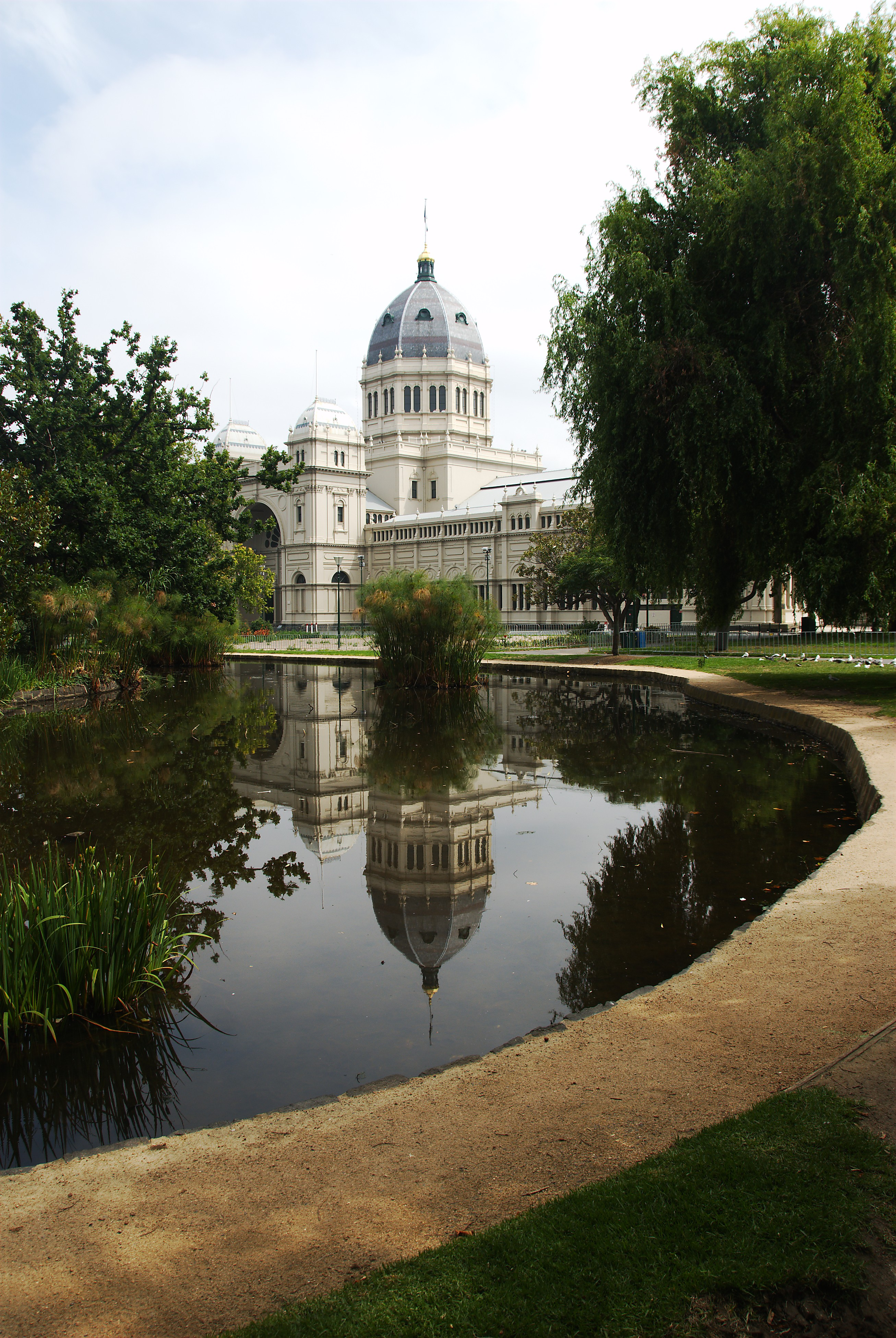
The building from the pool

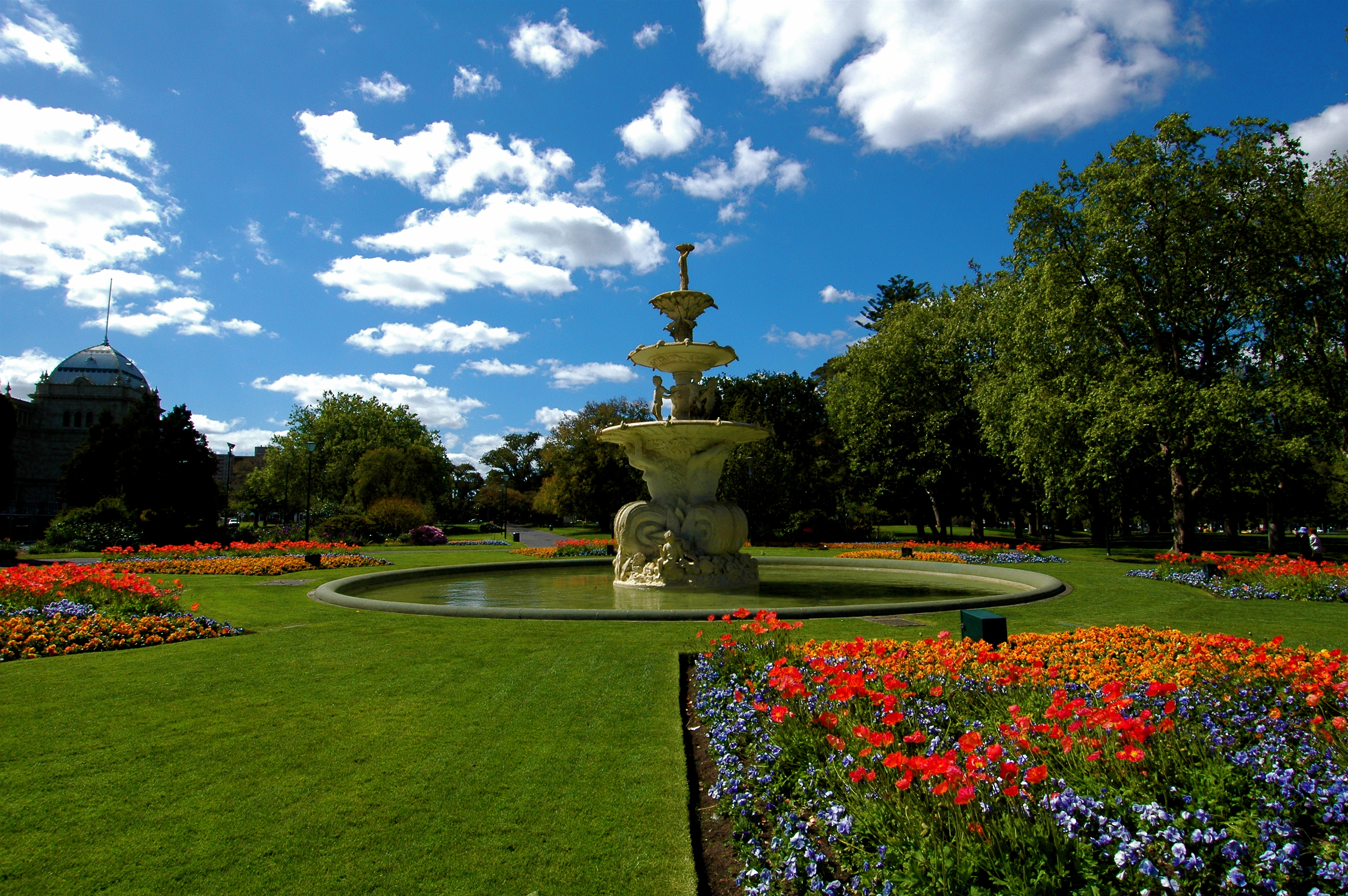
The Royal Exhibition Building's fountain

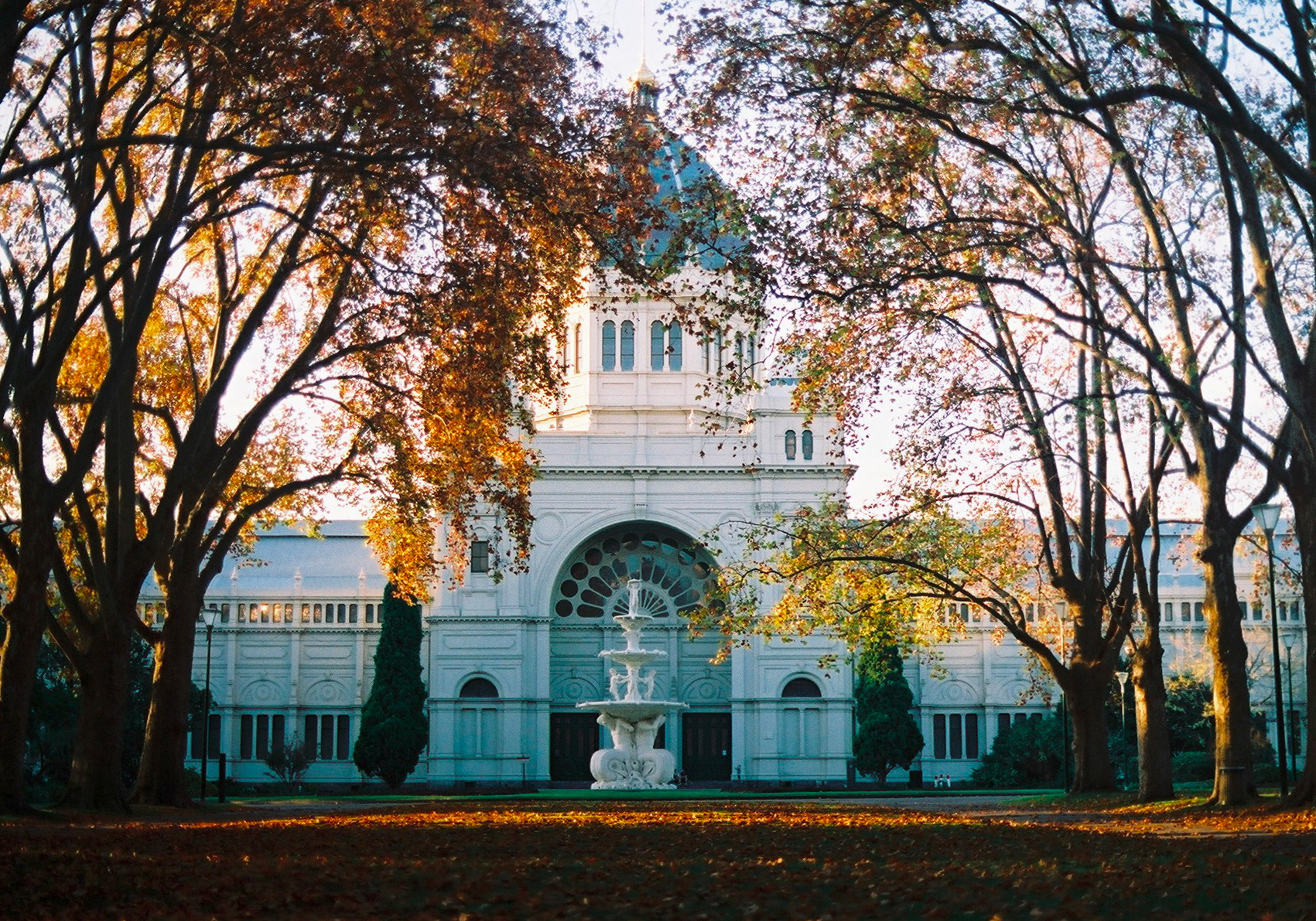
The Royal Exhibition Building from the main avenue of the Carlton Gardens

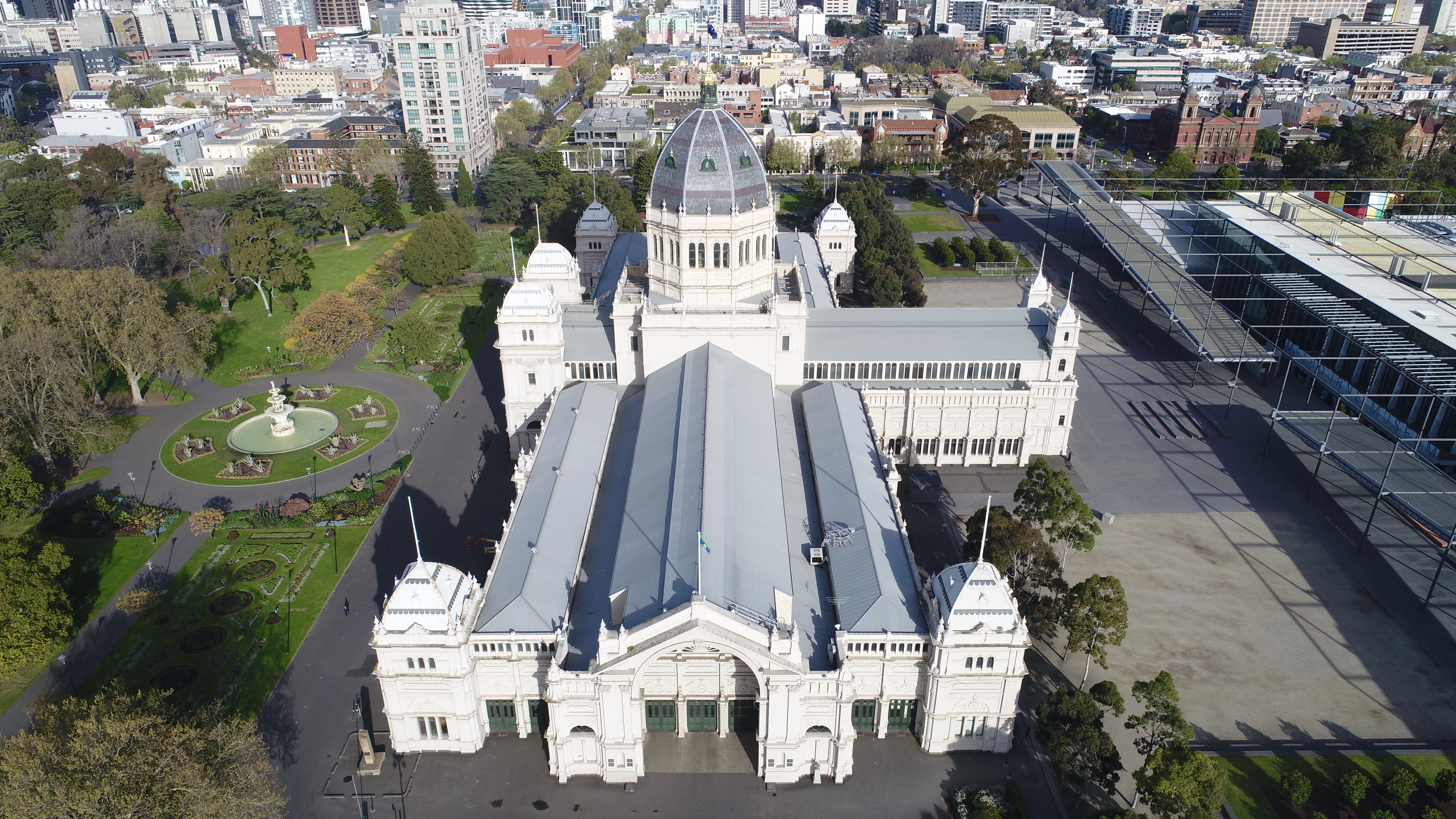
East side, aerial view

== Current use ==
The Royal Exhibition Building is used to this day as an exhibition venue for various festivals and fairs such as Melbourne Fashion Festival, Melbourne International Flower and Garden Show and Brickvention. During the COVID-19 pandemic, the building was used as a mass vaccination centre, operated by St Vincent's Hospital.

The Royal Exhibition Building is used as an exam hall for the University of Melbourne, Royal Melbourne Institute of Technology, Melbourne High School, Nossal High School, Mac.Robertson Girls' High School and Suzanne Cory High School.

The building is no longer Melbourne's largest commercial exhibition centre. The modern alternative is the Melbourne Convention & Exhibition Centre, which is in Southbank to the south of the Melbourne central business district.
