= Peace movements in Australia =

Peace movements in Australia have been organized to minimize the nation's involvement in foreign wars. The first significant peace organizations emerged against the Boer War (1899-1902), including the Melbourne Peace and Humanity Society (1900) and the Anti-War League (1902). Women played crucial organizational roles. During World War I, the Australian Peace Alliance (APA) formed in 1914, growing to 54 affiliated groups by 1918. It comprised pacifists, socialists, liberal Christians, trade unions, and women's groups like the Sisterhood of International Peace and the Women's Peace Army. A major focus was the anti-conscription movement. The movement diversified with Christian pacifists and secular organizations like the League of Nations Union.

The lead-up to World War II created divisions between absolute pacifists and those supporting collective security. Women's groups, particularly the Women's International League for Peace and Freedom (WILPF), were prominent in international disarmament efforts, including a significant 1931 petition. The peace movement experienced a resurgence in the 1960s, largely in opposition to the Vietnam War and conscription. The Campaign for Nuclear Disarmament (CND), founded in 1960, later integrated into the broader anti-Vietnam War movement.

== History ==
The first significant peace organisations emerged in 1899 after Australia sent troops to help the United Kingdom fight the Boer War in South Africa. The Melbourne Peace and Humanity Society (PHS) was founded in 1900, followed by the Anti-War League (AWL) in New South Wales in 1902. The Melbourne Peace Society (MPS) was established in 1905, with similar groups forming in other cities. Women played important roles, though mostly in organisational rather than leadership capacities. Notable early female leaders included Rose Scott and Marian Harwood.

With the outbreak of World War I in 1914, the Australian Peace Alliance (APA) was formed in 1914, initially with 13 affiliated groups, growing to 54 by 1918. The APA included pacifists, socialists, liberal Christians, trade unions, and women’s groups such as the Sisterhood of International Peace (SIP) and the Women’s Peace Army (WPA). The anti-conscription movement was a major focus during WWI, with groups like the No-Conscription Fellowship supporting conscientious objectors The peace movement diversified, with Christian pacifists and secular organisations like the League of Nations Union (LNU) and the Victorian Council Against War and Fascism (VCAWF) working together.

The rise of fascism and the approach of WWII caused divisions within the movement, particularly between absolute pacifists and those who supported collective security against aggression. Women’s groups, especially the Women’s International League for Peace and Freedom (WILPF), played a prominent role in international disarmament campaigns, including a major petition in 1931.

== Recent ==
The peace movement was revitalised in the 1960s, primarily in opposition to the Vietnam War and conscription. The Campaign for Nuclear Disarmament (CND) was founded in 1960, later merging into the broader anti-Vietnam War movement.

== See also ==
- Foreign relations of Australia
- Diplomatic history of Australia
- History of Australia
- Military history of Australia
