= Melbourne International Exhibition =

World's Fair held in Melbourne, Australia in 1880

1880 Melbourne
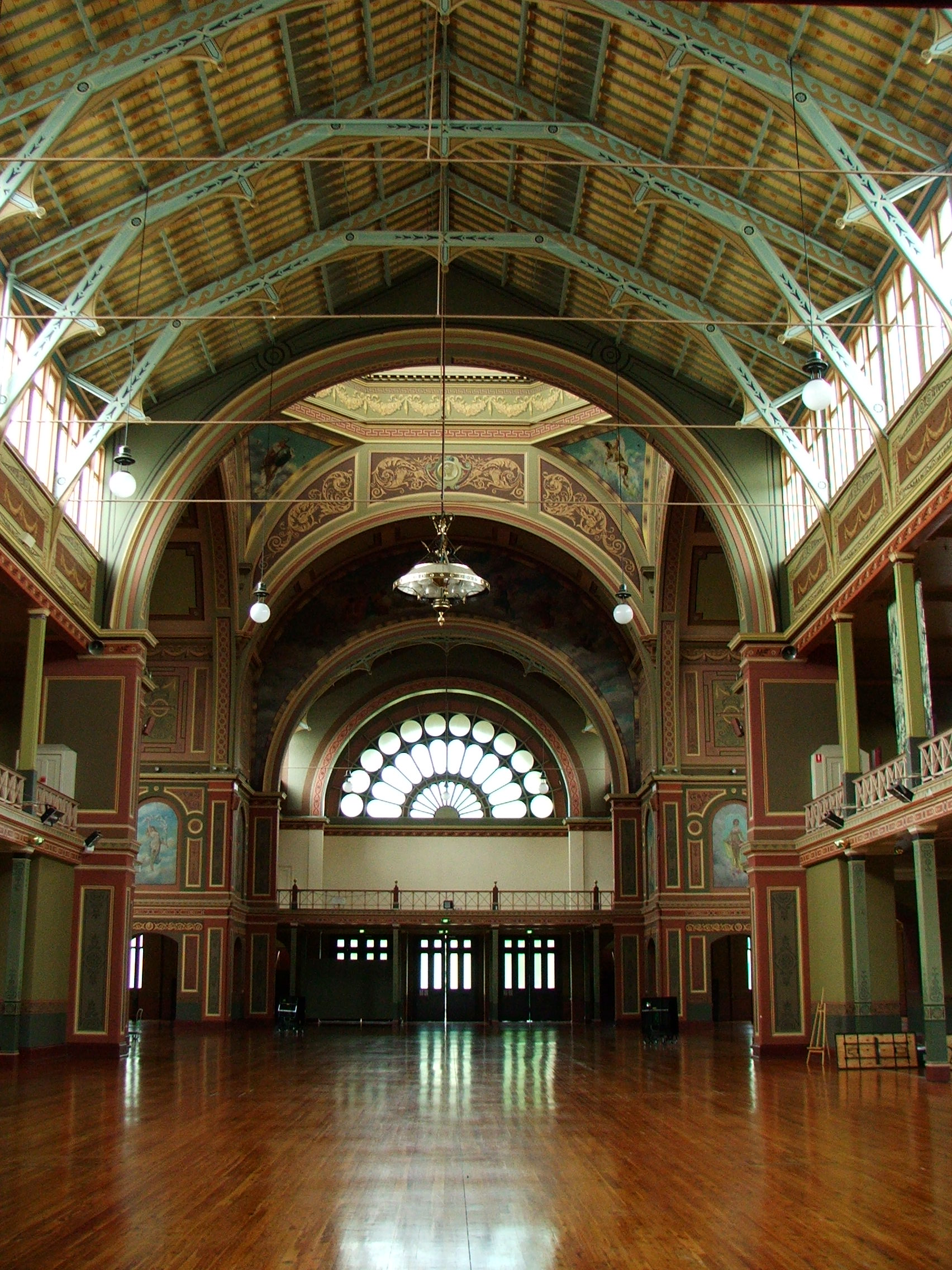
- Inside the halls of the World Heritage listed Melbourne Exhibition Buildings

Overview
- BIE-class: Universal exposition
- Category: Historical Expo
- Name: Melbourne International Exhibition
- Building(s): Royal Exhibition Building
- Area: 25 Ha
- Visitors: 1,330,279
- Organized by: Reed & Barnes Architects

Participant(s)
- Countries: 33

Location
- Country: Colony of Victoria
- City: Melbourne
- Venue: Carlton Gardens
- Coordinates: 37°48′22″S 144°58′13″E

Timeline
- Opening: 1 October 1880
- Closure: 30 April 1881

Universal expositions
- Previous: Exposition Universelle (1878) in Paris
- Next: Exposición Universal de Barcelona in Barcelona

The Melbourne International Exhibition is the eighth World's fair officially recognised by the Bureau International des Expositions (BIE) and the first official World's Fair in the Southern Hemisphere.

== Preparations ==
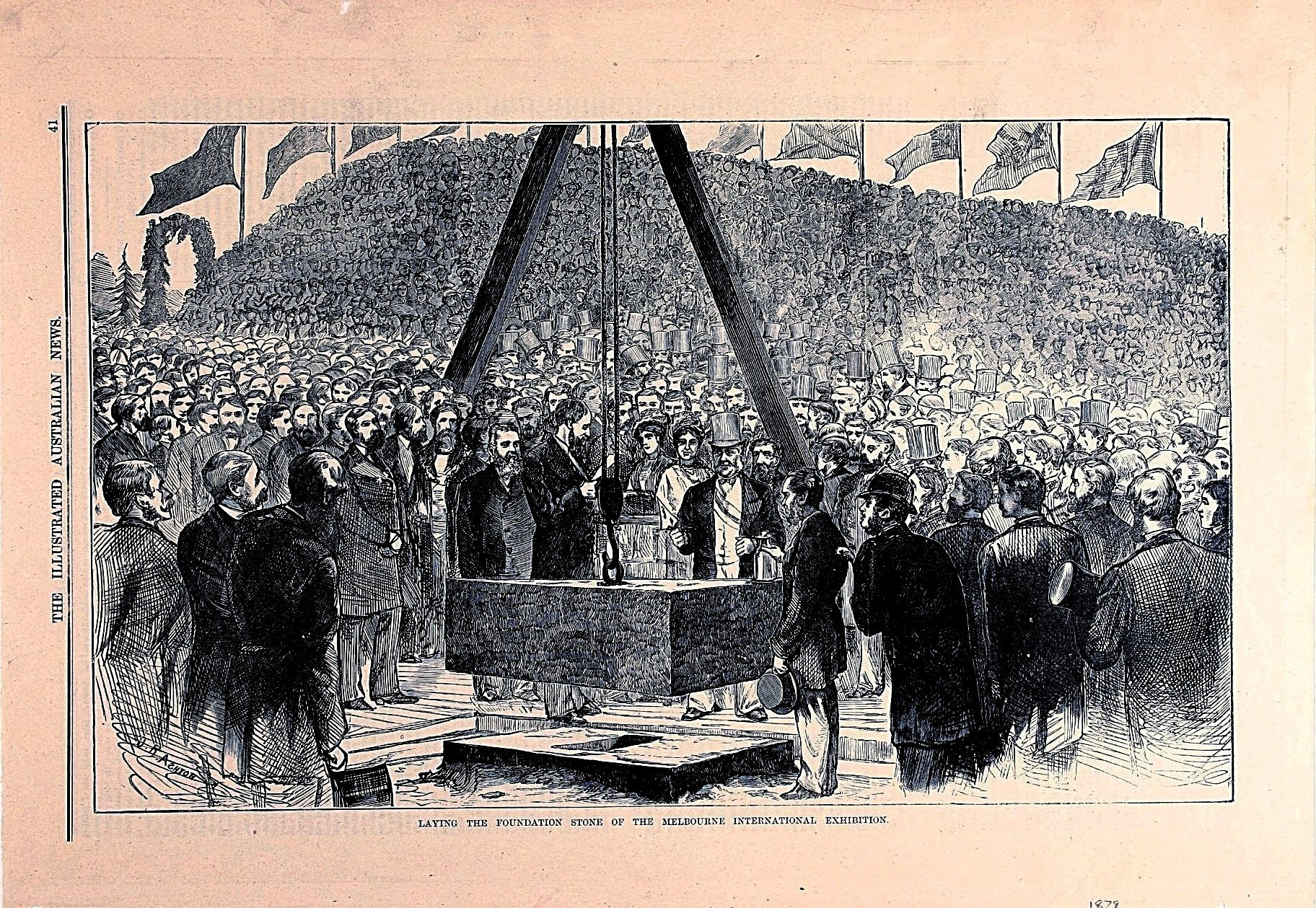
The laying of the foundation stone of the Exhibition Building on 19 February 1879

After being granted self-governance, Victoria (in 1851) and New South Wales (in 1856), saw a steady economic growth as a result of the discovery and exploitation of gold reserves. This growth during the 1850s and 1860s led to rivalry between their respective capitals Melbourne and Sydney. In the 1870's the focus turned to the outside world and proposals were made for organising an exhibition modelled on the great exhibitions of Europe, with an aim to promote commerce and industry, along with art, science and education. Melbourne started preparations in 1879 and filed a plan to the Parliament. Melbourne's rival Sydney, the older of the two cities, wanted to be the first and organised an exhibition in record time. This Sydney International Exhibition started in October 1879, but it focused mainly on agriculture, so it was not really universal and therefore did not meet the criteria for official recognition by the BIE. Melbourne decided to start their exhibition shortly after the one in Sydney, so the participants could transport their exhibits during the winter of 1880.

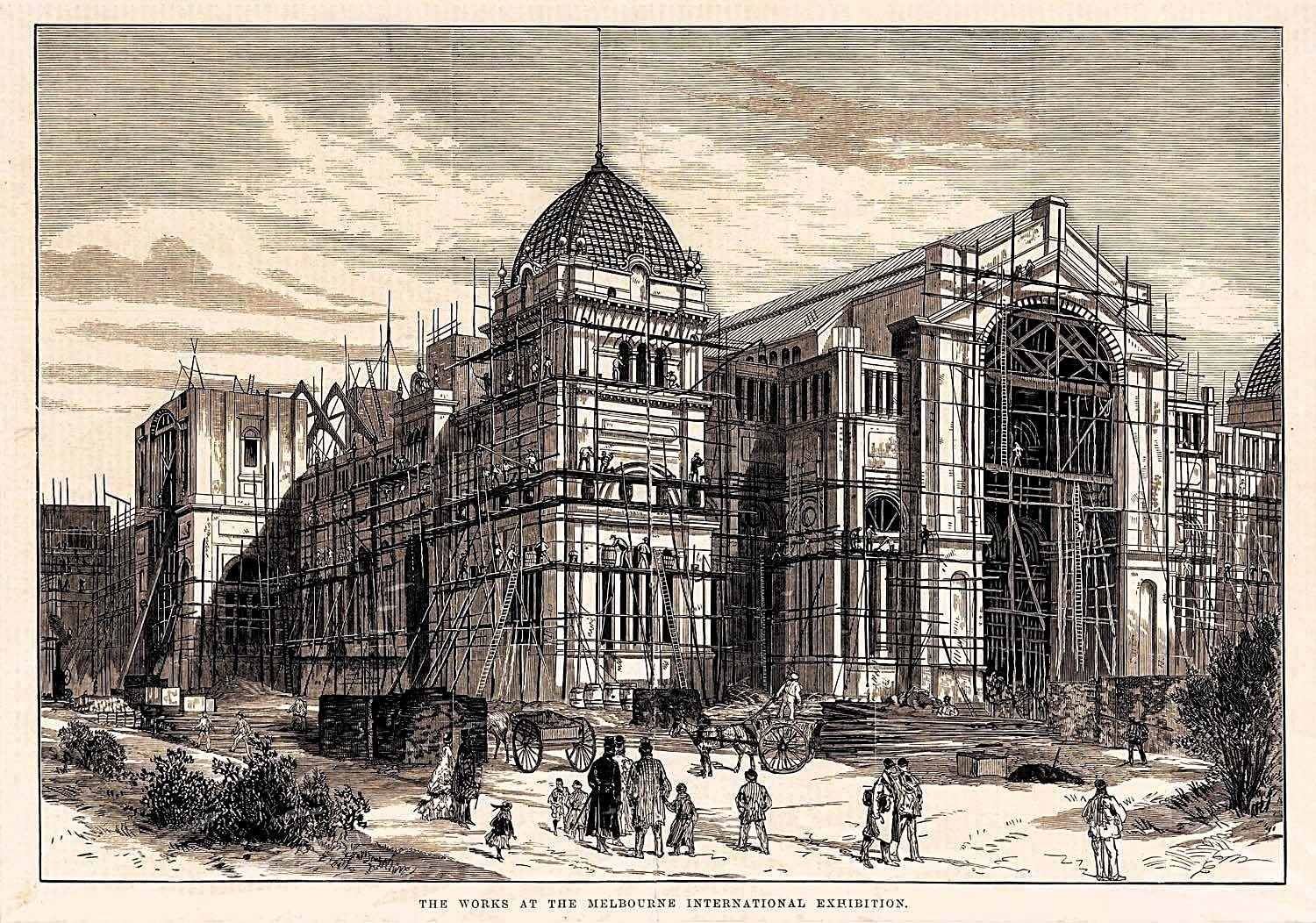
The Works at the Melbourne International Exhibition. 1878

In May 1878, the designs of Joseph Reed and Frederick Barnes were chosen for the Main Building of the Exhibition. On 19 February 1879 Governor Sir George Bowen laid the cornerstone in Carlton Garden for the new Exhibition Building. The building, built by David Mitchell, covered about 7 acres. Its nave measured 500 x 160 feet and the transept was 272 feet long. A large dome 60 feet in diameter rose 217 feet above the building. Two machinery annexes, each 460 x 138 feet, were built at the rear of the main building.

== Exhibition ==
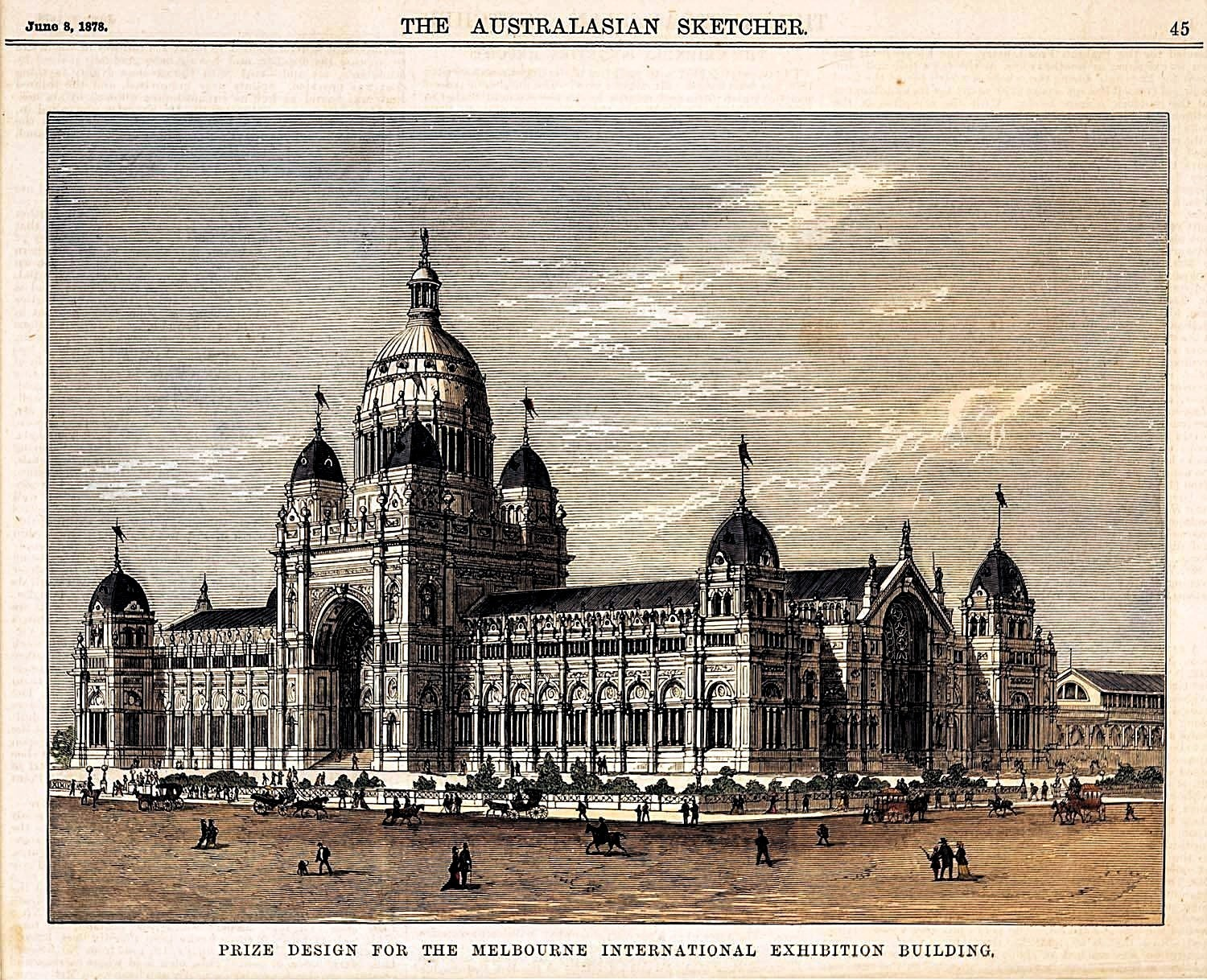
Prize Design for the Melbourne International Exhibition Building. 1878

Preparations for the exhibition

The Melbourne International Exhibition was held from 1 October 1880 until 30 April 1881. It was the second international exhibition to be held in Australia, the first being held the previous year in Sydney. 1.459 million people visited the exhibition, made a profit of £1,570. The exhibition was also opened for entertainment and tourism.

== Aftermath ==
The building was extended and reused in 1888 as venue for the Melbourne Centennial Exhibition, celebrating the founding of European settlement in Sydney in 1788. The main building or Great Hall as it became known has been used for exhibitions, balls, banquets, and during World War II was used by the Royal Australian Air Force. On 1 October 1980 it was announced that Her Majesty Queen Elizabeth II had conferred the title of "Royal" to the Exhibition Building. On 1 July 2004 the Royal Exhibition Building became the first building in Australia to become a World Heritage Site.

== See also ==
- Adelaide International Jubilee Exhibition of 1887
- Sydney International Exhibition
- Melbourne Centennial Exhibition
- Bob the Railway Dog
- Garnet Walch
