= Melbourne Centennial Exhibition =

World's Fair in Australia 1888–1889

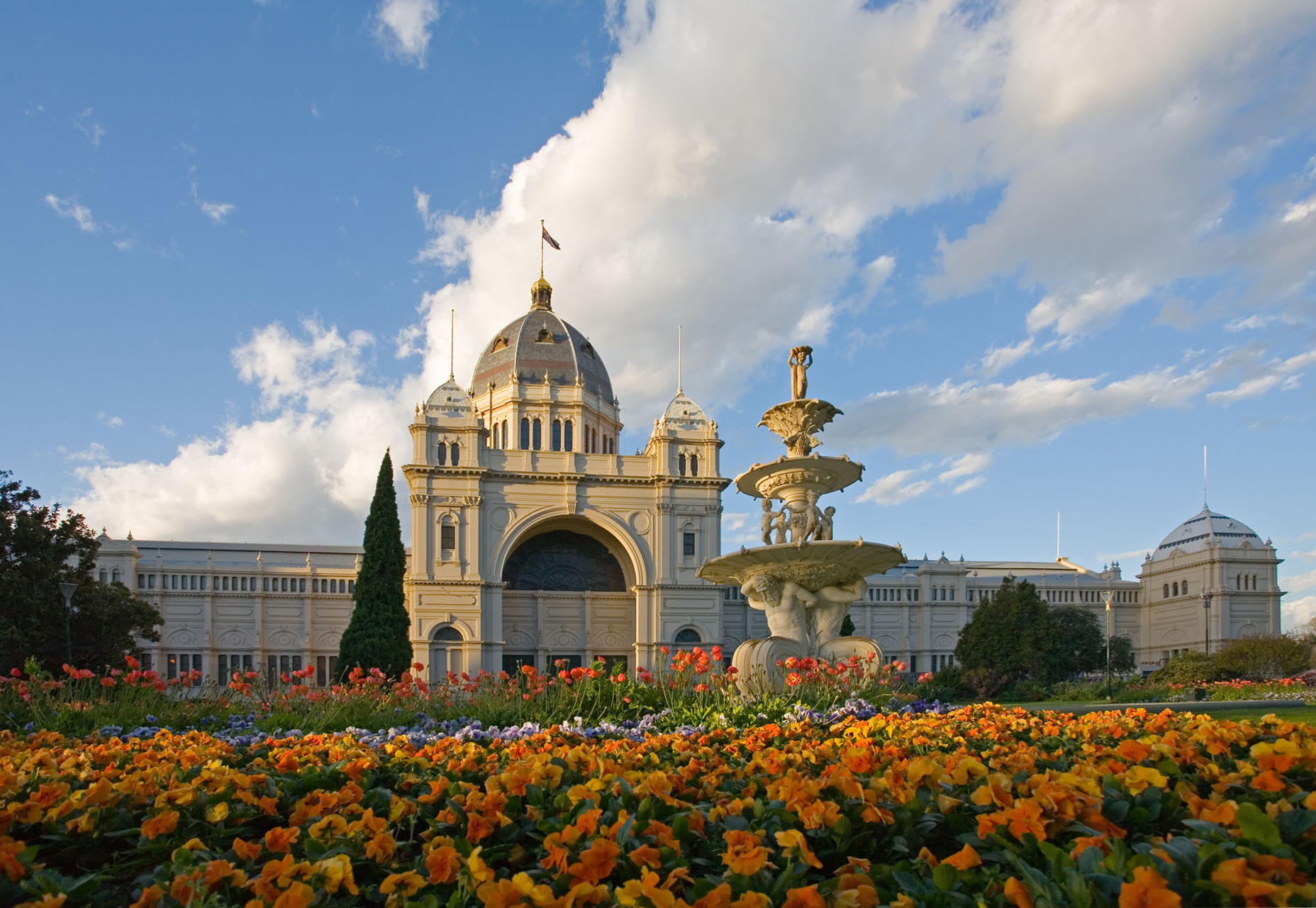
- The Royal Exhibition Building

Overview
- BIE-class: Unrecognized exposition
- Name: Melbourne Centennial Exhibition
- Area: 63 acres
- Visitors: 2,003,593

Participant(s)
- Countries: 34

Location
- Country: Colony of Victoria
- City: Melbourne
- Venue: Carlton Gardens
- Coordinates: 37°48′22″S 144°58′13″E

Timeline
- Opening: 1 August 1888
- Closure: 9 March 1889

Universal expositions
- Previous: Melbourne International Exhibition (1880) in Melbourne
- Next: Exposition Universelle (1889) in Paris

The Melbourne Centennial Exhibition of 1888–1889 was organised to celebrate a century of European settlement in Australia. The Exhibition Building, constructed in 1880 for the Melbourne International Exhibition, was extended and reused. The Centennial Exhibition focused on Australia itself, and emphasised music and painting that attracted many visitors. However the exhibition was not recognised by the Bureau of International Expositions as a "world's fair".

Parer & Higgins Co. paid £1250 to operate the bar and light refreshments, one of only three areas where the sale of alcohol was permitted.

Dora Elizabeth Armitage was at the exhibition, where she won a medal for her typing. Her testimonial about her Calligraph typewriter was used by its manufacturers in their advertising.
