= Zara Aronson =

Australian journalist (1864-1944)

Zara Aronson OBE
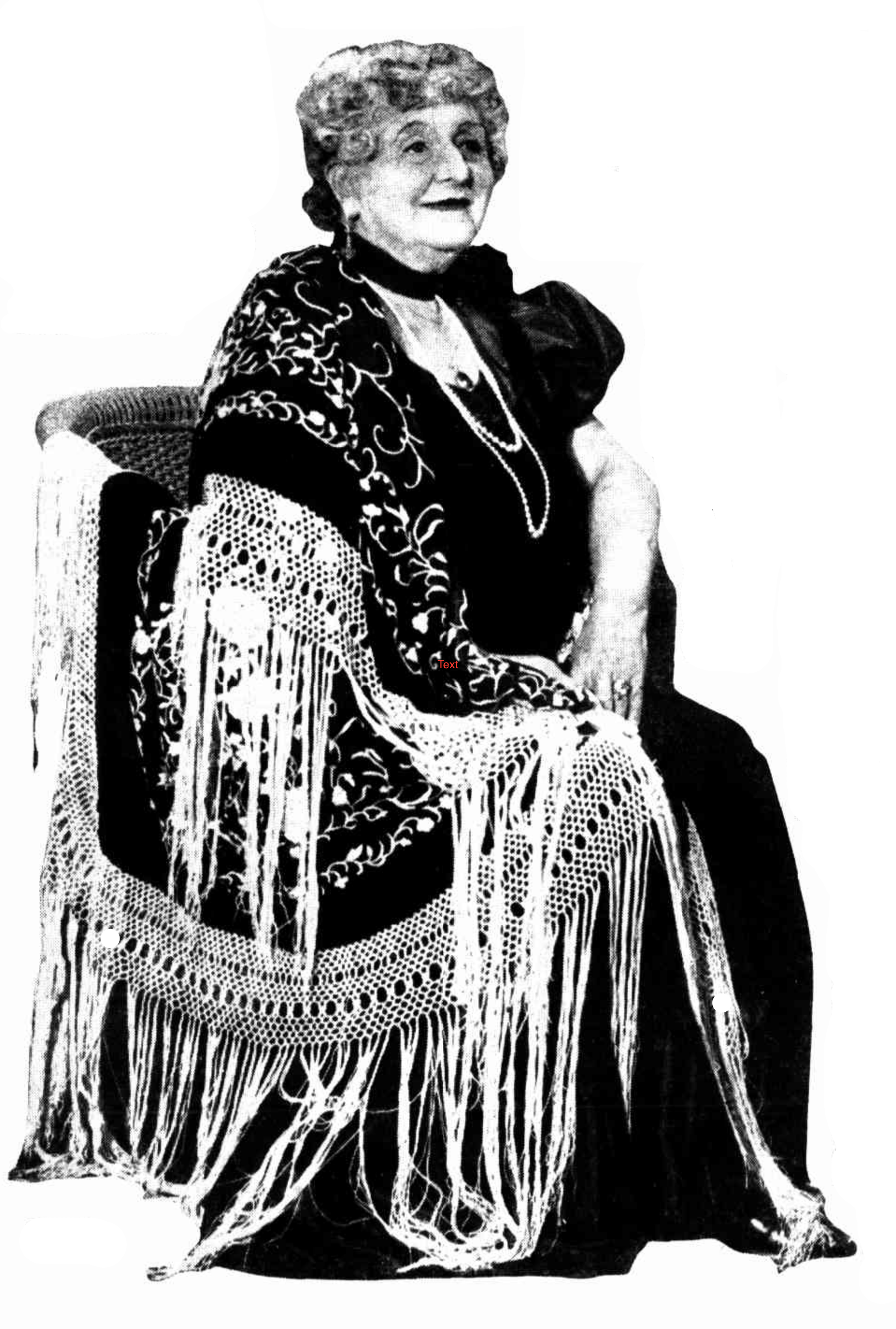
- Aronson in later life
- Born: Zara Baar; 4 September 1864; Sydney, Australia
- Died: 1 July 1944 (aged 79) at home, Darling Point, New South Wales, Australia
- Resting place: Jewish section of Rookwood Cemetery
- Other names: Mrs. Fred Anderson; "Thalia" (pen-name)
- Occupations: journalist; editor; welfare worker; restaurateur
- Spouse: Frederick Aronson (m. 1882; died 1928)

Signature
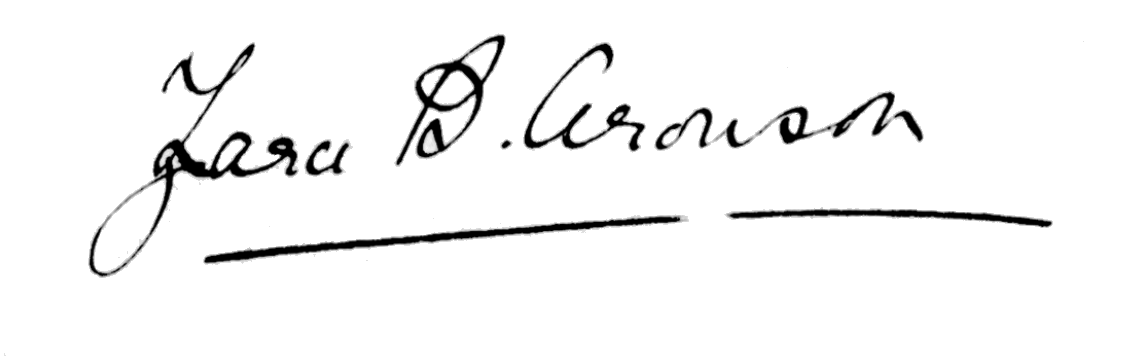

Zara Baar Aronson OBE (née Baar; 1864–1944) was a Sydney-based journalist, editor, welfare worker, feminist and restaurateur of Jewish background. She was born in Australia but spent her formative years in Europe, before returning to Sydney where she became a socialite as well as a social columnist and journalist in a number of major newspapers across Australian cities. She pursued social and charity work as well as her own business in publishing, food and catering. Aronson helped form the Society for Women Writers and a local branch of John O'London's Literary Circle, and was a founding member and secretary of the National Council of Women of Australia. During World War II she raised funds for the Junior Red Cross by selling a cookery book, after which she published another well-received cookbook, Twentieth Century Cookery Practice. In later life she was made a civil officer of the Order of the British Empire for her services to the community.

== Early life ==
Aronson was born in Sydney to Moritz Baar, merchant in Hanover and London, and his wife Zillah, née Valentine. Her family moved to Europe when she was three years old, and she was initially educated at Bradford Girls' Grammar School in Yorkshire, England, then at Wiesbaden in Germany. Her family returned to Sydney in 1879 and, according to the Australian Dictionary of Biography "attended Mrs Morell's school".

== Early endeavours ==
She was a member of several committees: the Sydney Industrial Blind Institution, the Thirlmere Home Committee and the Queen Victoria Homes for Consumptives. She was also a founding member of the National Council of Women of Australia, which formed in 1896, and was its corresponding secretary from 1900 to 1901 and honorary secretary from 1906 to 1908. After Lucy, wife of Henry Gullett, encouraged her to become a writer she secured work as a contributor to the Australian Town and Country Journal and the Illustrated London News. From 1897 to 1901 she wrote for the Sydney Mail as social editor after the death of Mrs Carl Fisher under the name "Thalia". From 1894 to 1899 she wrote the column "Sydney Boudoir Gossip" under the pen-name "Zara" for The Maitland Daily Mercury.

== Marriage ==
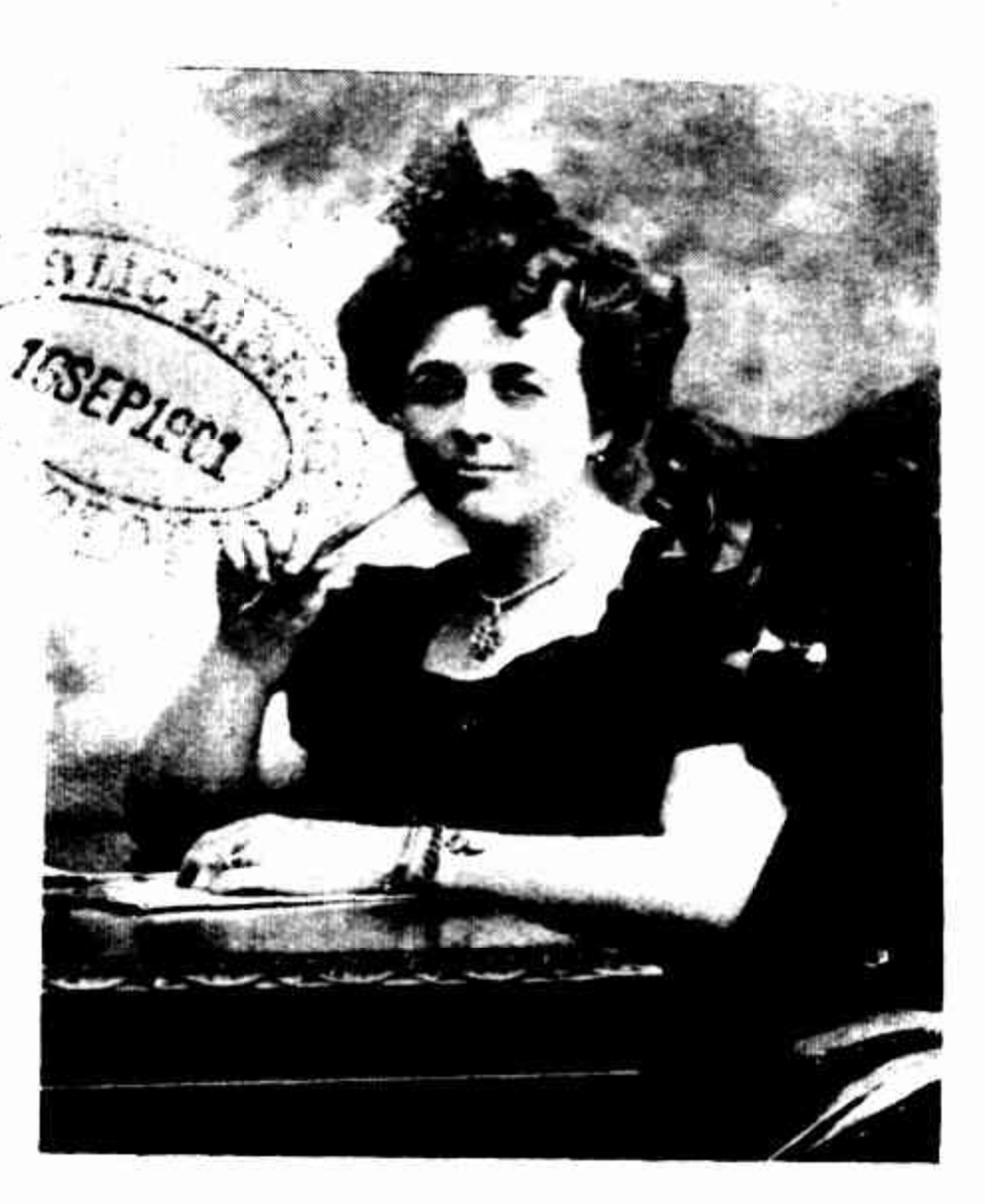
Aronson posing at her desk in 1901 for Table Talk magazine.

She was married to Frederick Aronson on 25 October 1882 at the Great Synagogue at Elizabeth Street, Sydney by Rabbi A. B. Davis. (Note: Note that there is a conflict between sources, the contemporary Australian Town and Country Journal states that she was married on a Tuesday, which would have been the 24 October 1882 ("Jewish wedding". Ladies' Page. Australian Town and Country Journal. Sydney. 1882. p. 28.) but the Australian Dictionary of Biography states she was married on 25 October 1882, which was a Wednesday. However, in a notice to The Sydney Morning Herald it states that she was married on 25 October 1882 ("Aaronson–Barr". Family Notices. The Sydney Morning Herald. Sydney. 30 October 1882. p. 1.), whilst in a notice to The Sydney Daily Telegraph the date given is 23 October 1882 ("Aronson–Baar". Family Notices. The Sydney Daily Telegraph. Sydney. 31 October 1882. p. 2.), after which The Sydney Morning Herald contradicts itself in a later edition and lists the marriage as being held on 23 October 1882 ("Aaronson–Barr". Family Notices. The Sydney Morning Herald. Sydney. 2 November 1882. p. 13.)) The couple had a baby on 5 September 1883, but the baby died 13 days later. The couple had a daughter Zelma and, in 1889, Aronson gave birth to a younger son, Malcolm Phillip.

Like Zara's father, her husband Frederick Aronson was also a merchant who had established a wholesale jewellery and importing business, Frederick Aronson & Co in 1899. The Aronsons lived at 8 Lancaster Villas, Ocean Street in Woollahra until 1901, before they moved to Melbourne as her husband took over the Melbourne branch of his company.

== Miles Franklin incident ==
Aronson later returned to Sydney and from between 1903 and 1904 she worked on the monthly magazine The Home Queen, where—according to the Australian Dictionary of Biography—she was the editor but, along with the wife of Bernhard Ringrose Wise, "wrote much of it herself, including the theatrical and fashion columns". It was whilst she was in this endeavour she came into conflict with Miles Franklin over a past column she wrote as Thalia. In a September 1902 column "Thalia" consistently misspelled Franklin's surname as "Francklin" and wrote that "her personal appearance is very much against her, as she is short, insignificant looking, and has a square face implying very little character until you begin to know her" and that "she certainly does not dress to the best advantage, which is also against her, as she has practically no idea on the subject of attractiveness". However she praised her intelligence and education.

Aronson evidently later wrote to Franklin, but her brother replied. Aronson responded "although I quite believe that your sister has asked you to reply to her correspondence, I think that someone in your household might have taught you a little politeness to a lady editress" and "I feel that Miss Franklin does not know that you have written me such a cheeky letter, as I always considered her a friend of mine", though she did enquire which column Thalia wrote that gave offence. Franklin's response was not recorded, however Aronson's reply was "The paragraph in question was shown to me and really I could not see anything very insolent in it. Certainly the Black ~~Heart~~ hair was a mistake, but then a little error like that is surely not worthy of your annoyance."

== Later years and death ==
In later years she was fashion editor for the Australian Town and Country Journal and the Sunday Times, as well as the Sydney social correspondent for the Telegraph. After her husband set up a branch of his business in Perth, Western Australia, she moved with him and became a journalist for the Western Mail. Upon return to Sydney in 1914, she moved to 86 Darling Point Road, Darling Point. She assisted the Junior Red Cross in their efforts to support troops fighting in World War I by donating the proceeds of her cookery book, which raised more than £500. Her son, Malcolm, joined the military as a Motor Transport Driver in the Army Medical Corps and departed to fight in the First World War on 20 August 1916 on the HMAT Shropshire.

In 1917, Aronson produced a well-received cookery book Twentieth Century Cooking and Home Decoration as Thalia, and by 1918 she had started the Mary Elizabeth Tea Rooms at 60 King Street, Sydney. Frederick died in 1928. She continued to run the Mary Elizabeth Tea Rooms, which The Hebrew Standard of Australasia described as "the meeting-place of many of Sydney's Bohemian personalities", however in 1932 she declared bankruptcy through Hungerford, Spooner & Co. and eventually paid her creditors. During this time she also helped form the Society of Women Writers, becoming the society's Honorary Secretary when it commenced in September 1925. She later became its president and retired on 17 October 1941, succeeded by Nora Kelly. She was also a founder of the local branch of the John O'London's Literary Circle.

On 23 June 1936, Aronson was made a civil imperial officer in the Order of the British Empire (OBE).

Aronson died at her house at Darling Point on 1 July 1944. She was buried in the Jewish section of Rookwood Cemetery and her memorial was consecrated on 20 May 1945.
