= Bulgaria at the 1956 Summer Olympics =

- IOC code: BUL
- NOC: Bulgarian Olympic Committee

in Melbourne/Stockholm
- Competitors: 43 in 6 sports
- Flag bearer: Georgi Panov
- Medals Ranked 19th: Gold 1 Silver 3 Bronze 1 Total 5

Summer Olympics appearances (overview)
- 1896; 1900–1920; 1924; 1928; 1932; 1936; 1948; 1952; 1956; 1960; 1964; 1968; 1972; 1976; 1980; 1984; 1988; 1992; 1996; 2000; 2004; 2008; 2012; 2016; 2020; 2024

Bulgaria competed at the 1956 Summer Olympics in Melbourne, Australia and Stockholm, Sweden (equestrian events).

== Medalists ==
Medal	Name	Sport	Event	Date
Gold	Nikola Stanchev	Wrestling	Men's Freestyle Middleweight	1 December
Silver	Yusein Mekhmedov	Wrestling	Men's Freestyle Heavyweight	1 December
Silver	Dimitar Dobrev	Wrestling	Men's Greco-Roman Middleweight	6 December
Silver	Petko Sirakov	Wrestling	Men's Greco-Roman Light Heavyweight	6 December
Bronze	Stefan Bozhkov, Todor Diev, Georgi Dimitrov, Milcho Goranov, Ivan Petkov Kolev, Nikola Kovachev, Manol Manolov, Dimitar Milanov, Georgi Naydenov, Panayot Panayotov, Kiril Rakarov, Gavril Stoyanov, Krum Yanev, and Yosif Yosifov	Association football	Men's team Competition	7 December

== Basketball ==
=== Group C ===
TEAM	PTS	P	W	L	PF	PA
Uruguay	6	3	3	0	238	187
Bulgaria	5	3	2	1	242	199
Formosa	4	3	1	2	216	249
South Korea	3	3	0	3	194	255

Uruguay 70, Bulgaria 65
Scoring by half: 38–35, 32–30

Bulgaria 89, South Korea 58
Scoring by half: 47–33, 42–25

Formosa (Taiwan) 71, Bulgaria 88
Scoring by half: 35–47, 36–41

=== Group B ===
TEAM	PTS	P	W	L	PF	PA
United States	6	3	3	0	283	150
Soviet Union	5	3	2	1	208	209
Bulgaria	4	3	1	2	182	224
Brazil	3	3	0	3	192	282

Bulgaria 44, United States 85
Scoring by half: 19–48, 25–37

Bulgaria 56, Soviet Union 66
Scoring by half: 32–37, 24–29

Bulgaria 82, Brazil 73
Scoring by half: 38–36, 44–37

=== Classification playoffs ===
Bulgaria 80, Philippines 70

=== 5th place match ===
Bulgaria 64, Brazil 52

== Boxing ==
Two boxers are competing for Bulgaria, including the bronze medalist from the last Olympics Boris Nikolov.He reached the quarterfinal, where he lost from Pietrzykowski from Poland.

Athlete	Event	First Round	Quarterfinal	Semifinal	Final	
Athlete	Event	Opposition Result	Opposition Result	Opposition Result	Opposition Result	Rank
Boris Nikolov	Men's light middleweight	Safdar (PAK); W PTS	Pietrzykowski (POL); L PTS	Did not advance		
Bozhil Lozanov	Men's heavyweight	Mukhin (URS); L ^{KO R3}				

== Football ==
=== First round ===
Bulgaria	w/o ^{1}	Egypt

Melbourne

=== Quarterfinals ===
30 November 1956
12:00

Bulgaria	6–1	Great Britain
Dimitrov 6'; Kolev 40' 85'; Milanov 45' 75' 80'	Report	Lewis 30'

Melbourne Cricket Ground, Melbourne
Attendance: 6,748
Referee: Wright (AUS)

=== Semifinals ===
5 December 1956
12:00

Soviet Union	2–1 (a.e.t.)	Bulgaria
Streltsov 112'; Tatushin 116'	Report	Kolev 95'

Olympic Park Stadium, Melbourne
Attendance: 21,079
Referee: R.H. Mann (GBR)

=== Bronze Medal match ===
7 December 1956
14:15

Bulgaria	3–0	India
Diev 37' 60'; Milanov 42'	Report

Melbourne Cricket Ground, Melbourne
Attendance: 21,236
Referee: Latyshev (USSR)

== Weightlifting ==
Men

Athlete	Event	Military press		Snatch		Clean & Jerk		Total	Rank
Athlete	Event	Result	Rank	Result	Rank	Result	Rank	Total	Rank
Ivan Abadzhiev	75 kg	102.5	15	117.5	2	137.5	6	357.5	7
Ivan Veselinov	90 kg	132.5	4	120	6	155	5	407.5	5

== Wrestling ==
Competition format

Each round featured all wrestlers pairing off and wrestling one bout (with one wrestler having a bye if there were an odd number). The loser received 3 points. The winner received 1 point if the win was by decision and 0 points if the win was by fall. Everyone, who is competing in the first round is qualifying for the second, no matter if they achieved a win by decision or fall, or they achieved a lose. At the end of each round, any wrestler with more than 5 points was eliminated. This elimination continued until the medal rounds, which began when 3 wrestlers remained. These 3 wrestlers each faced each other in a round-robin medal round (with earlier results counting, if any had wrestled another before); record within the medal round determined medals, with bad points breaking ties.

Key:

- VT - Victory by Fall.
- PP - Decision by Points - the loser with technical points.
- PO - Decision by Points - the loser without technical points.
- DQ - Fortreit - Lost because of fortreit.

Men's Greco-Roman

Athlete	Event	Round 1	Round 2	Round 3	Round 4	Medal rounds	Rank
Athlete	Event	Opposition Result	Opposition Result	Opposition Result	Opposition Result	Opposition Result	Rank
Dinko Petrov	Men's bantamweight	Vesterby (SWE); W 2-1 ^{PP}	Vercouteren (BEL); W 3-0 ^{PP}	Vyrupayev (URS); L Fall ^{VT}	Did not advance		6
Dimitar Stoyanov (Note: In the third round Stoyanov lost from Kyösti Lehtonen from Finland with result 0-3, but apart from that he was in the top five wrestlers with fewest points, which was enough for him to advance to the fourth round. In the fourth round, Stoyanov had to play two matches and win both of them to qualify for the medal rounds.Unfortunately, he lost his match against Riza Doğan from Turkey with result 1-3 and he did not advance)|	Men's lightweight	Anderberg (SWE); W 3–0 ^{PP}	Evans (USA); W 3-0 ^{PP}	Lehtonen (FIN) L 0-3 ^{PO}	Brötzner (AUT) W 3–0 Doğan (TUR) L 1-2 ^{PO}	Did not advance	5
Mitko Petkov	Men's welterweight	Vargset (NOR); W 3–0 ^{PP}	Mithat Bayrak (TUR); L Fortreit ^{DQ}	Did not advance			8
Dimitar Dobrev	Men's middleweight	Simic (YUG); W Fall ^{VT}	Bye	Punkari (FIN); W 2-1 ^{PP}	Kartozia (URS); L 1-2 ^{PO}	Jansson (SWE); W 3-0 ^{PP}	Silver medal
Petko Sirakov	Men's light heavyweight	Nikolayev (URS); L 0-3 ^{PO}	Atan (TUR); W 2-1 ^{PP}	O.Thomas (USA); W Fall ^{VT}	Steckle (CAN); W Fall ^{VT}	Nillson (SWE); W 3-0 ^{PP}	Silver medal
Husein Mehmedov	Men's heavyweight	Kangasniemi (FIN); W 3-0 ^{PP}	Dietrich (GER); L Fall ^{VT}	Parfyonov (URS); L Fortreit ^{DQ}	Did not advance		7

Men's Freestyle

Athlete	Event	Round 1	Round 2	Round 3	Round 4	Medal rounds	Rank
Athlete	Event	Opposition Result	Opposition Result	Opposition Result	Opposition Result	Opposition Result	Rank
Georgi Zaychev	Men's lightweight	Güngör (TUR); L 0-3 ^{PO}	Bye	Bestayev (URS); L Fall ^{VT}	Did not advance		10
Mitko Petkov	Men's welterweight	Ochman (CAN); W Fall ^{VT}	de Villiers (RSA); L 0-3 ^{PP}	Sorouri (IRN); L 0–3 ^{PO}	Did not advance		7
Nikola Stanchev	Men's middleweight	Skhirtladze (URS); W 3-0 ^{PP}	Katsuramoto (JPN); L Fall ^{VT}	Sterr (GER); W Fall ^{VT}	Lindblad (SWE); W Fall ^{VT}	Hodge (USA); W Fall ^{VT}	Gold medal
Husein Mehmedov	Men's heavyweight	Nouri (IRN); W 3-0 ^{PP}	Kangasniemi (FIN); W Fall ^{VT}	Vykhristyuk (URS); W 3-0 ^{PP}	Richmond (GBR); W 3-0 ^{PP}	Kaplan (TUR); L 0-3 ^{PO}	Silver medal
