= Wrestling at the 1956 Summer Olympics – Men's freestyle middleweight =

Wrestling at the Olympics

Men's freestyle middleweight at the Games of the XVI Olympiad
- Venue: Royal Exhibition Building
- Dates: 28 November–1 December 1956
- Competitors: 15 from 15 nations

Medalists
1st place, gold medalist(s)		Nikola Stanchev	Bulgaria
2nd place, silver medalist(s)		Dan Hodge	United States
3rd place, bronze medalist(s)		Georgy Skhirtladze	Soviet Union

The men's freestyle middleweight competition at the 1956 Summer Olympics in Melbourne took place from 28 November to 1 December at the Royal Exhibition Building. Nations were limited to one competitor. Middleweight was the third-heaviest category, including wrestlers weighing 73 to 79 kilograms (160.9 to 174.2 lb).

== Competition format ==
This freestyle wrestling competition continued to use the "bad points" elimination system introduced at the 1928 Summer Olympics for Greco-Roman and at the 1932 Summer Olympics for freestyle wrestling, as modified in 1952 (adding medal rounds and making all losses worth 3 points—from 1936 to 1948 losses by split decision only cost 2). Each round featured all wrestlers pairing off and wrestling one bout (with one wrestler having a bye if there were an odd number). The loser received 3 points. The winner received 1 point if the win was by decision and 0 points if the win was by fall. At the end of each round, any wrestler with at least 5 points was eliminated. This elimination continued until the medal rounds, which began when 3 wrestlers remained. These 3 wrestlers each faced each other in a round-robin medal round (with earlier results counting, if any had wrestled another before); record within the medal round determined medals, with bad points breaking ties.

== Results ==
=== Round 1 ===
Bouts

Winner	Nation	Victory Type	Loser	Nation
Viljo Punkari	Finland	Fall	Muhammad Faiz	Pakistan
Dan Hodge	United States	Fall	George Farquhar	Great Britain
Bakshish Singh	India	Decision, 3–0	William Davies	Australia
Bengt Lindblad	Sweden	Decision, 3–0	Manie van Zyl	South Africa
Hans Sterr	United Team of Germany	Fall	Nicolas Arcales	Philippines
Nikola Stanchev	Bulgaria	Decision, 3–0	Georgy Skhirtladze	Soviet Union
Abbas Zandi	Iran	Decision, 3–0	Kazuo Katsuramoto	Japan
İsmet Atlı	Turkey	Bye	N/A	N/A

Points

Rank	Wrestler	Nation	Start	Earned	Total
1	İsmet Atlı	Turkey	0	0	0
1	Dan Hodge	United States	0	0	0
1	Viljo Punkari	Finland	0	0	0
1	Hans Sterr	United Team of Germany	0	0	0
5	Bengt Lindblad	Sweden	0	1	1
5	Bakshish Singh	India	0	1	1
5	Nikola Stanchev	Bulgaria	0	1	1
5	Abbas Zandi	Iran	0	1	1
9	Nicolas Arcales	Philippines	0	3	3
9	William Davies	Australia	0	3	3
9	Muhammad Faiz	Pakistan	0	3	3
9	George Farquhar	Great Britain	0	3	3
9	Kazuo Katsuramoto	Japan	0	3	3
9	Georgy Skhirtladze	Soviet Union	0	3	3
9	Manie van Zyl	South Africa	0	3	3

=== Round 2 ===
Punkari withdrew after his bout.

Bouts

Winner	Nation	Victory Type	Loser	Nation
İsmet Atlı	Turkey	Fall	Muhammad Faiz	Pakistan
Dan Hodge	United States	Decision, 3–0	Viljo Punkari	Finland
William Davies	Australia	Decision, 3–0	George Farquhar	Great Britain
Manie van Zyl	South Africa	Decision, 3–0	Bakshish Singh	India
Hans Sterr	United Team of Germany	Fall	Bengt Lindblad	Sweden
Georgy Skhirtladze	Soviet Union	Fall	Nicolas Arcales	Philippines
Kazuo Katsuramoto	Japan	Fall	Nikola Stanchev	Bulgaria
Abbas Zandi	Iran	Bye	N/A	N/A

Points

Rank	Wrestler	Nation	Start	Earned	Total
1	İsmet Atlı	Turkey	0	0	0
1	Hans Sterr	United Team of Germany	0	0	0
3	Dan Hodge	United States	0	1	1
3	Abbas Zandi	Iran	1	0	1
5	Kazuo Katsuramoto	Japan	3	0	3
5	Georgy Skhirtladze	Soviet Union	3	0	3
7	William Davies	Australia	3	1	4
7	Bengt Lindblad	Sweden	1	3	4
7	Bakshish Singh	India	1	3	4
7	Nikola Stanchev	Bulgaria	1	3	4
7	Manie van Zyl	South Africa	3	1	4
12	Viljo Punkari	Finland	0	3	3*
13	Nicolas Arcales	Philippines	3	3	6
13	Muhammad Faiz	Pakistan	3	3	6
13	George Farquhar	Great Britain	3	3	6

=== Round 3 ===
Bouts

Winner	Nation	Victory Type	Loser	Nation
İsmet Atlı	Turkey	Decision, 3–0	Abbas Zandi	Iran
Dan Hodge	United States	Fall	William Davies	Australia
Bengt Lindblad	Sweden	Fall	Bakshish Singh	India
Georgy Skhirtladze	Soviet Union	Fall	Manie van Zyl	South Africa
Nikola Stanchev	Bulgaria	Fall	Hans Sterr	United Team of Germany
Kazuo Katsuramoto	Japan	Bye	N/A	N/A

Points

Rank	Wrestler	Nation	Start	Earned	Total
1	İsmet Atlı	Turkey	0	1	1
1	Dan Hodge	United States	1	0	1
3	Kazuo Katsuramoto	Japan	3	0	3
3	Georgy Skhirtladze	Soviet Union	3	0	3
3	Hans Sterr	United Team of Germany	0	3	3
6	Bengt Lindblad	Sweden	4	0	4
6	Nikola Stanchev	Bulgaria	4	0	4
6	Abbas Zandi	Iran	1	3	4
9	William Davies	Australia	4	3	7
9	Bakshish Singh	India	4	3	7
9	Manie van Zyl	South Africa	4	3	7

=== Round 4 ===
Bouts

Winner	Nation	Victory Type	Loser	Nation
İsmet Atlı	Turkey	Decision, 3–0	Kazuo Katsuramoto	Japan
Dan Hodge	United States	Fall	Abbas Zandi	Iran
Nikola Stanchev	Bulgaria	Fall	Bengt Lindblad	Sweden
Georgy Skhirtladze	Soviet Union	Fall	Hans Sterr	United Team of Germany

Points

Rank	Wrestler	Nation	Start	Earned	Total
1	Dan Hodge	United States	1	0	1
2	İsmet Atlı	Turkey	1	1	2
3	Georgy Skhirtladze	Soviet Union	3	0	3
4	Nikola Stanchev	Bulgaria	4	0	4
5	Kazuo Katsuramoto	Japan	3	3	6
5	Hans Sterr	United Team of Germany	3	3	6
7	Bengt Lindblad	Sweden	4	3	7
7	Abbas Zandi	Iran	4	3	7

=== Round 5 ===
Bouts

Winner	Nation	Victory Type	Loser	Nation
Georgy Skhirtladze	Soviet Union	Decision, 2–1	İsmet Atlı	Turkey
Nikola Stanchev	Bulgaria	Fall	Dan Hodge	United States

Points

Rank	Wrestler	Nation	Start	Earned	Total
1	Dan Hodge	United States	1	3	4
1	Georgy Skhirtladze	Soviet Union	3	1	4
1	Nikola Stanchev	Bulgaria	4	0	4
4	İsmet Atlı	Turkey	2	3	5

=== Medal rounds ===
Stanchev's victories over Skhirtladze in round 1 and Hodge in round 5 counted for the medal rounds, giving the Bulgarian wrestler the gold medal with a 2–0 record against the other medalists. Hodge defeated Skhirtladze in a de facto silver medal match.

Bouts

Winner	Nation	Victory Type	Loser	Nation
Dan Hodge	United States	Fall	Georgy Skhirtladze	Soviet Union

Points

Rank	Wrestler	Nation	Wins	Losses
1st place, gold medalist(s)	Nikola Stanchev	Bulgaria	2	0
2nd place, silver medalist(s)	Dan Hodge	United States	1	1
3rd place, bronze medalist(s)	Georgy Skhirtladze	Soviet Union	0	2
