= Wrestling at the 1956 Summer Olympics – Men's freestyle welterweight =

Wrestling at the Olympics

Men's freestyle welterweight at the Games of the XVI Olympiad
- Venue: Royal Exhibition Building
- Dates: 28 November–1 December 1956
- Competitors: 15 from 15 nations

Medalists
1st place, gold medalist(s)		Mitsuo Ikeda	Japan
2nd place, silver medalist(s)		İbrahim Zengin	Turkey
3rd place, bronze medalist(s)		Vakhtang Balavadze	Soviet Union

The men's freestyle welterweight competition at the 1956 Summer Olympics in Melbourne took place from 28 November to 1 December at the Royal Exhibition Building. Nations were limited to one competitor. Welterweight was the fourth-heaviest category, including wrestlers weighing 67 to 73 kilograms (147.7 to 160.9 lb).

== Competition format ==
This freestyle wrestling competition continued to use the "bad points" elimination system introduced at the 1928 Summer Olympics for Greco-Roman and at the 1932 Summer Olympics for freestyle wrestling, as modified in 1952 (adding medal rounds and making all losses worth 3 points—from 1936 to 1948 losses by split decision only cost 2). Each round featured all wrestlers pairing off and wrestling one bout (with one wrestler having a bye if there were an odd number). The loser received 3 points. The winner received 1 point if the win was by decision and 0 points if the win was by fall. At the end of each round, any wrestler with at least 5 points was eliminated. This elimination continued until the medal rounds, which began when 3 wrestlers remained. These 3 wrestlers each faced each other in a round-robin medal round (with earlier results counting, if any had wrestled another before); record within the medal round determined medals, with bad points breaking ties.

== Results ==
=== Round 1 ===
Ochman and Rantanen withdrew after their bouts.

Bouts

Winner	Nation	Victory Type	Loser	Nation
Mitko Petkov	Bulgaria	Fall	Bruno Ochman	Canada
Nabi Sorouri	Iran	Fall	Devi Singh	India
Mitsuo Ikeda	Japan	Decision, 3–0	Ernie Fischer	United States
İbrahim Zengin	Turkey	Fall	Ernst Wandaller	Austria
Per Berlin	Sweden	Decision, 3–0	Noel Granger	Australia
Vakhtang Balavadze	Soviet Union	Decision, 3–0	Veikko Rantanen	Finland
Alfred Tischendorf	United Team of Germany	Decision, 3–0	Muhammad Latif	Pakistan
Coenraad de Villiers	South Africa	Bye	N/A	N/A

Points

Rank	Wrestler	Nation	Start	Earned	Total
1	Coenraad de Villiers	South Africa	0	0	0
1	Mitko Petkov	Bulgaria	0	0	0
1	Nabi Sorouri	Iran	0	0	0
1	İbrahim Zengin	Turkey	0	0	0
5	Vakhtang Balavadze	Soviet Union	0	1	1
5	Per Berlin	Sweden	0	1	1
5	Mitsuo Ikeda	Japan	0	1	1
5	Alfred Tischendorf	United Team of Germany	0	1	1
9	Ernie Fischer	United States	0	3	3
9	Noel Granger	Australia	0	3	3
9	Muhammad Latif	Pakistan	0	3	3
9	Devi Singh	India	0	3	3
9	Ernst Wandaller	Austria	0	3	3
14	Bruno Ochman	Canada	0	3	3*
14	Veikko Rantanen	Finland	0	3	3*

=== Round 2 ===
Bouts

Winner	Nation	Victory Type	Loser	Nation
Coenraad de Villiers	South Africa	Decision, 3–0	Mitko Petkov	Bulgaria
Ernie Fischer	United States	Decision, 3–0	Nabi Sorouri	Iran
Mitsuo Ikeda	Japan	Fall	Devi Singh	India
İbrahim Zengin	Turkey	Fall	Noel Granger	Australia
Per Berlin	Sweden	Fall	Ernst Wandaller	Austria
Vakhtang Balavadze	Soviet Union	Fall	Alfred Tischendorf	United Team of Germany
Muhammad Latif	Pakistan	Bye	N/A	N/A

Points

Rank	Wrestler	Nation	Start	Earned	Total
1	İbrahim Zengin	Turkey	0	0	0
2	Vakhtang Balavadze	Soviet Union	1	0	1
2	Per Berlin	Sweden	1	0	1
2	Coenraad de Villiers	South Africa	0	1	1
2	Mitsuo Ikeda	Japan	1	0	1
6	Muhammad Latif	Pakistan	3	0	3
6	Mitko Petkov	Bulgaria	0	3	3
6	Nabi Sorouri	Iran	0	3	3
9	Ernie Fischer	United States	3	1	4
9	Alfred Tischendorf	United Team of Germany	1	3	4
11	Noel Granger	Australia	3	3	6
11	Devi Singh	India	3	3	6
11	Ernst Wandaller	Austria	3	3	6

=== Round 3 ===
Bouts

Winner	Nation	Victory Type	Loser	Nation
Coenraad de Villiers	South Africa	Decision, 3–0	Muhammad Latif	Pakistan
Nabi Sorouri	Iran	Decision, 3–0	Mitko Petkov	Bulgaria
İbrahim Zengin	Turkey	Decision, 3–0	Ernie Fischer	United States
Mitsuo Ikeda	Japan	Decision, 3–0	Vakhtang Balavadze	Soviet Union
Per Berlin	Sweden	Decision, 3–0	Alfred Tischendorf	United Team of Germany

Points

Rank	Wrestler	Nation	Start	Earned	Total
1	İbrahim Zengin	Turkey	0	1	1
2	Per Berlin	Sweden	1	1	2
2	Coenraad de Villiers	South Africa	1	1	2
2	Mitsuo Ikeda	Japan	1	1	2
5	Vakhtang Balavadze	Soviet Union	1	3	4
5	Nabi Sorouri	Iran	3	1	4
7	Muhammad Latif	Pakistan	3	3	6
7	Mitko Petkov	Bulgaria	3	3	6
9	Ernie Fischer	United States	4	3	7
9	Alfred Tischendorf	United Team of Germany	4	3	7

=== Round 4 ===
Bouts

Winner	Nation	Victory Type	Loser	Nation
Nabi Sorouri	Iran	Decision, 3–0	Coenraad de Villiers	South Africa
Mitsuo Ikeda	Japan	Decision, 3–0	İbrahim Zengin	Turkey
Vakhtang Balavadze	Soviet Union	Fall	Per Berlin	Sweden

Points

Rank	Wrestler	Nation	Start	Earned	Total
1	Mitsuo Ikeda	Japan	2	1	3
2	Vakhtang Balavadze	Soviet Union	4	0	4
2	İbrahim Zengin	Turkey	1	3	4
4	Per Berlin	Sweden	2	3	5
4	Coenraad de Villiers	South Africa	2	3	5
4	Nabi Sorouri	Iran	4	1	5

=== Medal rounds ===
Ikeda's victories over Balavadze in round 3 and Zengin in round 4 counted for the medal rounds, giving the Japanese wrestler the gold medal with a 2–0 record against the other medalists. Zengin defeated Balavadze in a de facto silver medal match.

Bouts

Winner	Nation	Victory Type	Loser	Nation
İbrahim Zengin	Turkey	Fall	Vakhtang Balavadze	Soviet Union

Points

Rank	Wrestler	Nation	Wins	Losses
1st place, gold medalist(s)	Mitsuo Ikeda	Japan	2	0
2nd place, silver medalist(s)	İbrahim Zengin	Turkey	1	1
3rd place, bronze medalist(s)	Vakhtang Balavadze	Soviet Union	0	2
