= Wrestling at the 1956 Summer Olympics – Men's Greco-Roman heavyweight =

Wrestling at the Olympics

Men's Greco-Roman heavyweight at the Games of the XVI Olympiad
- Venue: Royal Exhibition Building
- Dates: 3–6 December 1956
- Competitors: 10 from 10 nations

Medalists
1st place, gold medalist(s)		Anatoly Parfyonov	Soviet Union
2nd place, silver medalist(s)		Wilfried Dietrich	United Team of Germany
3rd place, bronze medalist(s)		Adelmo Bulgarelli	Italy

The men's Greco-Roman heavyweight competition at the 1956 Summer Olympics in Melbourne took place from 3 December to 6 December at the Royal Exhibition Building. Nations were limited to one competitor. Heavyweight was the heaviest category, including wrestlers weighing over 87 kilograms (191.8 lb).

== Competition format ==
This Greco-Roman wrestling competition continued to use the "bad points" elimination system introduced at the 1928 Summer Olympics for Greco-Roman and at the 1932 Summer Olympics for freestyle wrestling, as modified in 1952 (adding medal rounds and making all losses worth three points—from 1936 to 1948 losses by split decision only cost two points). Each round featured all wrestlers pairing off and wrestling one bout (with one wrestler having a bye if there were an odd number). The loser received three points. The winner received one point if the win was by decision and zero points if the win was by fall. At the end of each round, any wrestler with at least five points was eliminated. This elimination continued until the medal rounds, which began when three wrestlers remained. These three wrestlers each faced each other in a round-robin medal round (with earlier results counting, if any had wrestled another before); record within the medal round determined medals, with bad points breaking ties.

== Results ==
=== Round 1 ===
Bouts

Winner	Nation	Victory Type	Loser	Nation
Hamit Kaplan	Turkey	Decision, 3–0	Adelmo Bulgarelli	Italy
Antonios Georgoulis	Greece	Decision, 3–0	Joseph Zammit	Australia
Yusein Mekhmedov	Bulgaria	Decision, 3–0	Taisto Kangasniemi	Finland
Bertil Antonsson	Sweden	Fall	Dale Lewis	United States
Anatoly Parfyonov	Soviet Union	Decision, 2–1	Wilfried Dietrich	United Team of Germany

Points

Rank	Wrestler	Nation	Start	Earned	Total
1	Bertil Antonsson	Sweden	0	0	0
2	Antonios Georgoulis	Greece	0	1	1
2	Hamit Kaplan	Turkey	0	1	1
2	Yusein Mekhmedov	Bulgaria	0	1	1
2	Anatoly Parfyonov	Soviet Union	0	1	1
6	Adelmo Bulgarelli	Italy	0	3	3
6	Wilfried Dietrich	United Team of Germany	0	3	3
6	Taisto Kangasniemi	Finland	0	3	3
6	Dale Lewis	United States	0	3	3
6	Joseph Zammit	Australia	0	3	3

=== Round 2 ===
Bouts

Winner	Nation	Victory Type	Loser	Nation
Adelmo Bulgarelli	Italy	Fall	Joseph Zammit	Australia
Hamit Kaplan	Turkey	Decision, 3–0	Antonios Georgoulis	Greece
Taisto Kangasniemi	Finland	Fall	Dale Lewis	United States
Wilfried Dietrich	United Team of Germany	Fall	Yusein Mekhmedov	Bulgaria
Bertil Antonsson	Sweden	Decision, 3–0	Anatoly Parfyonov	Soviet Union

Points

Rank	Wrestler	Nation	Start	Earned	Total
1	Bertil Antonsson	Sweden	0	1	1
2	Hamit Kaplan	Turkey	1	1	2
3	Adelmo Bulgarelli	Italy	3	0	3
3	Wilfried Dietrich	United Team of Germany	3	0	3
3	Taisto Kangasniemi	Finland	3	0	3
6	Antonios Georgoulis	Greece	1	3	4
6	Yusein Mekhmedov	Bulgaria	1	3	4
6	Anatoly Parfyonov	Soviet Union	1	3	4
9	Dale Lewis	United States	3	3	6
9	Joseph Zammit	Australia	3	3	6

=== Round 3 ===
Bouts

Winner	Nation	Victory Type	Loser	Nation
Adelmo Bulgarelli	Italy	Fall	Antonios Georgoulis	Greece
Hamit Kaplan	Turkey	Decision, 2–1	Taisto Kangasniemi	Finland
Anatoly Parfyonov	Soviet Union	Forfeit	Yusein Mekhmedov	Bulgaria
Wilfried Dietrich	United Team of Germany	Decision, 3–0	Bertil Antonsson	Sweden

Points

Rank	Wrestler	Nation	Start	Earned	Total
1	Hamit Kaplan	Turkey	2	1	3
1	Adelmo Bulgarelli	Italy	3	0	3
3	Bertil Antonsson	Sweden	1	3	4
3	Wilfried Dietrich	United Team of Germany	3	1	4
3	Anatoly Parfyonov	Soviet Union	4	0	4
6	Taisto Kangasniemi	Finland	3	3	6
7	Antonios Georgoulis	Greece	4	3	7
7	Yusein Mekhmedov	Bulgaria	4	3	7

=== Round 4 ===
Bouts

Winner	Nation	Victory Type	Loser	Nation
Adelmo Bulgarelli	Italy	Fall	Bertil Antonsson	Sweden
Wilfried Dietrich	United Team of Germany	Decision, 3–0	Hamit Kaplan	Turkey
Anatoly Parfyonov	Soviet Union	Bye	N/A	N/A

Points

Rank	Wrestler	Nation	Start	Earned	Total
1	Adelmo Bulgarelli	Italy	3	0	3
2	Anatoly Parfyonov	Soviet Union	4	0	4
3	Wilfried Dietrich	United Team of Germany	4	1	5
4	Hamit Kaplan	Turkey	3	3	6
5	Bertil Antonsson	Sweden	4	3	7

=== Medal rounds ===
Parfyonov's victory over Dietrich in round 1 counted for the medal rounds. Parfyonov faced Bulgarelli in the medal rounds, winning the bout to secure the gold medal at 2–0 against the other medalists. Dietrich then also defeated Bulgarelli to earn silver at 1–1, with Bulgarelli earning the bronze at 0–2 against the other medalists.

Bouts

Winner	Nation	Victory Type	Loser	Nation
Anatoly Parfyonov	Soviet Union	Decision, 3–0	Adelmo Bulgarelli	Italy
Wilfried Dietrich	United Team of Germany	Decision, 3–0	Adelmo Bulgarelli	Italy

Points

Rank	Wrestler	Nation	Wins	Losses
1st place, gold medalist(s)	Anatoly Parfyonov	Soviet Union	2	0
2nd place, silver medalist(s)	Wilfried Dietrich	United Team of Germany	1	1
3rd place, bronze medalist(s)	Adelmo Bulgarelli	Italy	0	2
