= Wrestling at the 1956 Summer Olympics – Men's Greco-Roman welterweight =

Wrestling at the Olympics

Men's Greco-Roman welterweight at the Games of the XVI Olympiad
- Venue: Royal Exhibition Building
- Dates: 3–6 December 1956
- Competitors: 11 from 11 nations

Medalists
1st place, gold medalist(s)		Mithat Bayrak	Turkey
2nd place, silver medalist(s)		Vladimir Maneyev	Soviet Union
3rd place, bronze medalist(s)		Per Berlin	Sweden

The men's Greco-Roman welterweight competition at the 1956 Summer Olympics in Melbourne took place from 3 December to 6 December at the Royal Exhibition Building. Nations were limited to one competitor. Welterweight was the fourth-heaviest category, including wrestlers weighing 67 to 73 kilograms (147.7 to 160.9 lb).

== Competition format ==
This Greco-Roman wrestling competition continued to use the "bad points" elimination system introduced at the 1928 Summer Olympics for Greco-Roman and at the 1932 Summer Olympics for freestyle wrestling, as modified in 1952 (adding medal rounds and making all losses worth 3 points—from 1936 to 1948 losses by split decision only cost 2). Each round featured all wrestlers pairing off and wrestling one bout (with one wrestler having a bye if there were an odd number). The loser received 3 points. The winner received 1 point if the win was by decision and 0 points if the win was by fall. At the end of each round, any wrestler with at least 5 points was eliminated. This elimination continued until the medal rounds, which began when 3 wrestlers remained. These 3 wrestlers each faced each other in a round-robin medal round (with earlier results counting, if any had wrestled another before); record within the medal round determined medals, with bad points breaking ties.

== Results ==
=== Round 1 ===
Vargset withdrew after his bout.

Bouts

Winner	Nation	Victory Type	Loser	Nation
Mithat Bayrak	Turkey	Decision, 2–1	Miklós Szilvásy	Hungary
Mitko Petkov	Bulgaria	Decision, 3–0	Oddvar Vargset	Norway
Siegfried Schäfer	United Team of Germany	Fall	Fred Murphy	Australia
Vladimir Maneyev	Soviet Union	Decision, 3–0	Veikko Rantanen	Finland
Per Berlin	Sweden	Fall	Ernst Wandaller	Austria
Jay Holt	United States	Bye	N/A	N/A

Points

Rank	Wrestler	Nation	Start	Earned	Total
1	Per Berlin	Sweden	0	0	0
1	Jay Holt	United States	0	0	0
1	Siegfried Schäfer	United Team of Germany	0	0	0
4	Mithat Bayrak	Turkey	0	1	1
4	Vladimir Maneyev	Soviet Union	0	1	1
4	Mitko Petkov	Bulgaria	0	1	1
7	Fred Murphy	Australia	0	3	3
7	Veikko Rantanen	Finland	0	3	3
7	Miklós Szilvásy	Hungary	0	3	3
7	Ernst Wandaller	Austria	0	3	3
11	Oddvar Vargset	Norway	0	3	3*

=== Round 2 ===
Petkov withdrew due to injury at 8:15 into his bout and was unable to continue the competition.

Bouts

Winner	Nation	Victory Type	Loser	Nation
Miklós Szilvásy	Hungary	Decision, 3–0	Jay Holt	United States
Mithat Bayrak	Turkey	Forfeit	Mitko Petkov	Bulgaria
Veikko Rantanen	Finland	Decision, 3–0	Siegfried Schäfer	United Team of Germany
Per Berlin	Sweden	Fall	Fred Murphy	Australia
Vladimir Maneyev	Soviet Union	Fall	Ernst Wandaller	Austria

Points

Rank	Wrestler	Nation	Start	Earned	Total
1	Per Berlin	Sweden	0	0	0
2	Mithat Bayrak	Turkey	1	0	1
2	Vladimir Maneyev	Soviet Union	1	0	1
4	Jay Holt	United States	0	3	3
4	Siegfried Schäfer	United Team of Germany	0	3	3
6	Veikko Rantanen	Finland	3	1	4
6	Miklós Szilvásy	Hungary	3	1	4
8	Mitko Petkov	Bulgaria	1	3	4*
9	Fred Murphy	Australia	3	3	6
9	Ernst Wandaller	Austria	3	3	6

=== Round 3 ===
Bouts

Winner	Nation	Victory Type	Loser	Nation
Mithat Bayrak	Turkey	Decision, 3–0	Jay Holt	United States
Veikko Rantanen	Finland	Decision, 3–0	Miklós Szilvásy	Hungary
Vladimir Maneyev	Soviet Union	Decision, 2–1	Siegfried Schäfer	United Team of Germany
Per Berlin	Sweden	Bye	N/A	N/A

Points

Rank	Wrestler	Nation	Start	Earned	Total
1	Per Berlin	Sweden	0	0	0
2	Mithat Bayrak	Turkey	1	1	2
2	Vladimir Maneyev	Soviet Union	1	1	2
4	Veikko Rantanen	Finland	4	1	5
5	Siegfried Schäfer	United Team of Germany	3	3	6
5	Jay Holt	United States	3	3	6
7	Miklós Szilvásy	Hungary	4	3	7

=== Medal rounds ===
The Official Report shows Berlin defeating Maneyev in the medal rounds while Sports-Reference shows the opposite result (Maneyev winning the bout against Berlin). The latter is consistent with the final placings, which have Maneyev as the silver medalist and Berlin the bronze. Bayrak defeated both of the other medalists to earn the gold medal.

Bouts

Winner	Nation	Victory Type	Loser	Nation
Mithat Bayrak	Turkey	Decision, 3–0	Per Berlin	Sweden
Vladimir Maneyev	Soviet Union	Decision, 3–0	Per Berlin	Sweden
Mithat Bayrak	Turkey	Decision, 3–0	Vladimir Maneyev	Soviet Union

Points

Rank	Wrestler	Nation	Wins	Losses
1st place, gold medalist(s)	Mithat Bayrak	Turkey	2	0
2nd place, silver medalist(s)	Vladimir Maneyev	Soviet Union	1	1
3rd place, bronze medalist(s)	Per Berlin	Sweden	0	2
