= Dobrev =

Dobrev (Bulgarian: Добрев) is a Bulgarian surname, derived from the personal name Dobri. Notable people with the surname include:

- Bogdan Dobrev, Bulgarian rower
- Delyan Dobrev, Bulgarian politician
- Dimitar Dobrev, Bulgarian academic
- Dimitar Dobrev (wrestler), Bulgarian wrestler
- Dobri Dobrev, Bulgarian footballer
- Dobri Dobrev, Bulgarian beggar known for donating the money he collected towards the restoration of decaying Bulgarian monasteries and churches and the utility bills of orphanages
- Klára Dobrev, the Bulgarian descended wife of former Hungarian Prime Minister Ferenc Gyurcsány
- Konstantin Dobrev (born 1974), Bulgarian badminton player
- Kristian Dobrev, Bulgarian footballer
- Milen Dobrev, Bulgarian wrestler
- Nikolay Dobrev, Bulgarian politician and candidate for prime minister of Bulgaria in 1997
- Nina Dobrev, Bulgarian-Canadian actress
