= Dimitar Dobrev =

Dimitar Dobrev may refer to:

- Dimitar Dobrev (wrestler), Bulgarian Greco-Roman wrestler
- Dimitar Dobrev (academic), Bulgarian economist
- Dimitar Dobrev (officer), Bulgarian naval officer
