= Wrestling at the 1956 Summer Olympics – Men's Greco-Roman middleweight =

Wrestling at the Olympics

Men's Greco-Roman middleweight at the Games of the XVI Olympiad
- Venue: Royal Exhibition Building
- Dates: 3–6 December 1956
- Competitors: 10 from 10 nations

Medalists
1st place, gold medalist(s)		Givi Kartozia	Soviet Union
2nd place, silver medalist(s)		Dimitar Dobrev	Bulgaria
3rd place, bronze medalist(s)		Rune Jansson	Sweden

The men's Greco-Roman middleweight competition at the 1956 Summer Olympics in Melbourne took place from 3 December to 6 December at the Royal Exhibition Building. Nations were limited to one competitor. Middleweight was the third-heaviest category, including wrestlers weighing 73 to 79 kilograms (160.9 to 174.2 lb).

== Competition format ==
This Greco-Roman wrestling competition continued to use the "bad points" elimination system introduced at the 1928 Summer Olympics for Greco-Roman and at the 1932 Summer Olympics for freestyle wrestling, as modified in 1952 (adding medal rounds and making all losses worth 3 points—from 1936 to 1948 losses by split decision only cost 2). Each round featured all wrestlers pairing off and wrestling one bout (with one wrestler having a bye if there were an odd number). The loser received 3 points. The winner received 1 point if the win was by decision and 0 points if the win was by fall. At the end of each round, any wrestler with at least 5 points was eliminated. This elimination continued until the medal rounds, which began when 3 wrestlers remained. These 3 wrestlers each faced each other in a round-robin medal round (with earlier results counting, if any had wrestled another before); record within the medal round determined medals, with bad points breaking ties.

== Results ==
=== Round 1 ===
Simić withdrew after his bout.

Bouts

Winner	Nation	Victory Type	Loser	Nation
Viljo Punkari	Finland	Fall	Wally Paterson	Australia
Givi Kartozia	Soviet Union	Decision, 3–0	Rune Jansson	Sweden
György Gurics	Hungary	Decision, 2–1	Jim Peckham	United States
Hans Sterr	United Team of Germany	Fall	İsmet Atlı	Turkey
Dimitar Dobrev	Bulgaria	Fall	Branislav Simić	Yugoslavia

Points

Rank	Wrestler	Nation	Start	Earned	Total
1	Dimitar Dobrev	Bulgaria	0	0	0
1	Viljo Punkari	Finland	0	0	0
1	Hans Sterr	United Team of Germany	0	0	0
4	György Gurics	Hungary	0	1	1
4	Givi Kartozia	Soviet Union	0	1	1
6	İsmet Atlı	Turkey	0	3	3
6	Rune Jansson	Sweden	0	3	3
6	William Paterson	Australia	0	3	3
6	Jim Peckham	United States	0	3	3
10	Branislav Simić	Yugoslavia	0	3	3*

=== Round 2 ===
Bouts

Winner	Nation	Victory Type	Loser	Nation
Rune Jansson	Sweden	Fall	Viljo Punkari	Finland
Givi Kartozia	Soviet Union	Fall	Wally Paterson	Australia
Jim Peckham	United States	Decision, 2–1	Hans Sterr	United Team of Germany
György Gurics	Hungary	Decision, 3–0	İsmet Atlı	Turkey
Dimitar Dobrev	Bulgaria	Bye	N/A	N/A

Points

Rank	Wrestler	Nation	Start	Earned	Total
1	Dimitar Dobrev	Bulgaria	0	0	0
2	Givi Kartozia	Soviet Union	1	0	1
3	György Gurics	Hungary	1	1	2
4	Rune Jansson	Sweden	3	0	3
4	Viljo Punkari	Finland	0	3	3
4	Hans Sterr	United Team of Germany	0	3	3
7	Jim Peckham	United States	3	1	4
8	İsmet Atlı	Turkey	3	3	6
8	William Paterson	Australia	3	3	6

=== Round 3 ===
Bouts

Winner	Nation	Victory Type	Loser	Nation
Dimitar Dobrev	Bulgaria	Decision, 2–1	Viljo Punkari	Finland
Rune Jansson	Sweden	Decision, 2–1	Jim Peckham	United States
Givi Kartozia	Soviet Union	Decision, 3–0	György Gurics	Hungary
Hans Sterr	United Team of Germany	Bye	N/A	N/A

Points

Rank	Wrestler	Nation	Start	Earned	Total
1	Dimitar Dobrev	Bulgaria	0	1	1
2	Givi Kartozia	Soviet Union	1	1	2
3	Hans Sterr	United Team of Germany	3	0	3
4	Rune Jansson	Sweden	3	1	4
5	György Gurics	Hungary	2	3	5
6	Viljo Punkari	Finland	3	3	6
7	Jim Peckham	United States	4	3	7

=== Round 4 ===
Bouts

Winner	Nation	Victory Type	Loser	Nation
Rune Jansson	Sweden	Decision, 3–0	Hans Sterr	United Team of Germany
Givi Kartozia	Soviet Union	Decision, 2–1	Dimitar Dobrev	Bulgaria

Points

Rank	Wrestler	Nation	Start	Earned	Total
1	Givi Kartozia	Soviet Union	2	1	3
2	Dimitar Dobrev	Bulgaria	1	3	4
3	Rune Jansson	Sweden	4	1	5
4	Hans Sterr	United Team of Germany	3	3	6

=== Medal rounds ===
Kartozia's victories over Jansson in round 1 and over Dobrev in round 4 counted for the medal round, giving him the gold medal with a 2–0 record against the other medalists. Dobrev defeated Jansson in a de facto silver medal bout.

Bouts

Winner	Nation	Victory Type	Loser	Nation
Dimitar Dobrev	Bulgaria	Decision, 3–0	Rune Jansson	Sweden

Points

Rank	Wrestler	Nation	Wins	Losses
1st place, gold medalist(s)	Givi Kartozia	Soviet Union	2	0
2nd place, silver medalist(s)	Dimitar Dobrev	Bulgaria	1	1
3rd place, bronze medalist(s)	Rune Jansson	Sweden	0	2
