= Ochman =

Ochman is a surname. Notable people with the surname include:

- Bruno Ochman (1929–1990), Canadian wrestler
- Joe Ochman, American actor
- Krystian Ochman (born 1999), also known mononymously as Ochman, Polish-American singer
- Wiesław Ochman (born 1937), Polish opera singer

== See also ==
- Mauricio Ochmann (born 1977), American-born actor
