= Devi Singh =

Devi Singh can refer to:

- Devi Singh (sport shooter) (born 1932), Indian sports shooter
- Devi Singh (wrestler) (born 1926), Indian wrestler
- Devi Singh of Sikar, ruler of Sikar, India from 1763 to 1795
- Devi Singh (ruler) (1922–2007), Rana of Barwani

== See also ==
- Devi Singh Bhati, Indian politician
- Devi Singh Shekhawat, Indian politician
- Devi Singh Shekhawat, fictional character in the 2022 Indian TV series Pushpa Impossible, portrayed by Urvashi Dholakia
