= Muhammad Latif (disambiguation) =

Muhammad Latif may refer to:

- Muhammad Latif, Pakistani wrestler
- Mohamed Latif, Egyptian football manager
- Muhammed Latif, Iraqi major general
