= Hossein Nouri =

Hossein Nouri may refer to:

- Hossein Nouri (wrestler, born 1931) (1931–1980), Iranian freestyle wrestler who competed at the 1956 Summer Olympics
- Hossein Nouri (wrestler, born 1990), Iranian Greco-Roman wrestler
- Hossein Noori Hamedani (born 1925), Iranian Twelver Shi'a Marja
- Hossein Nuri (born 1954), Iranian painter, playwright and film director
