= Wrestling at the 1956 Summer Olympics – Men's freestyle heavyweight =

Wrestling at the Olympics

Men's freestyle heavyweight at the Games of the XVI Olympiad
- Venue: Royal Exhibition Building
- Dates: 28 November–1 December 1956
- Competitors: 11 from 11 nations

Medalists
1st place, gold medalist(s)		Hamit Kaplan	Turkey
2nd place, silver medalist(s)		Husein Mehmedov	Bulgaria
3rd place, bronze medalist(s)		Taisto Kangasniemi	Finland

The men's freestyle heavyweight competition at the 1956 Summer Olympics in Melbourne took place from 28 November to 1 December at the Royal Exhibition Building. Nations were limited to one competitor. Heavyweight was the heaviest category, including wrestlers weighing over 87 kilograms (191.8 lb).

== Competition format ==
This freestyle wrestling competition continued to use the "bad points" elimination system introduced at the 1928 Summer Olympics for Greco-Roman and at the 1932 Summer Olympics for freestyle wrestling, as modified in 1952 (adding medal rounds and making all losses worth 3 points—from 1936 to 1948 losses by split decision only cost 2). Each round featured all wrestlers pairing off and wrestling one bout (with one wrestler having a bye if there were an odd number). The loser received 3 points. The winner received 1 point if the win was by decision and 0 points if the win was by fall. At the end of each round, any wrestler with at least 5 points was eliminated. This elimination continued until the medal rounds, which began when 3 wrestlers remained. These 3 wrestlers each faced each other in a round-robin medal round (with earlier results counting, if any had wrestled another before); record within the medal round determined medals, with bad points breaking ties.

== Results ==
=== Round 1 ===
Bouts

Winner	Nation	Victory Type	Loser	Nation
Husein Mehmedov	Bulgaria	Decision, 3–0	Hossein Nouri	Iran
Ivan Vykhristyuk	Soviet Union	Decision, 3–0	John Da Silva	New Zealand
Ken Richmond	Great Britain	Decision, 3–0	Lila Ram	India
Hamit Kaplan	Turkey	Decision, 2–1	Bill Kerslake	United States
Ray Mitchell	Australia	Decision, 2–1	Saburo Nakao	Japan
Taisto Kangasniemi	Finland	Bye	N/A	N/A

Points

Rank	Wrestler	Nation	Start	Earned	Total
1	Taisto Kangasniemi	Finland	0	0	0
2	Hamit Kaplan	Turkey	0	1	1
2	Husein Mehmedov	Bulgaria	0	1	1
2	Ray Mitchell	Australia	0	1	1
2	Ken Richmond	Great Britain	0	1	1
2	Ivan Vykhristyuk	Soviet Union	0	1	1
7	John Da Silva	New Zealand	0	3	3
7	Bill Kerslake	United States	0	3	3
7	Saburo Nakao	Japan	0	3	3
7	Hossein Nouri	Iran	0	3	3
7	Lila Ram	India	0	3	3

=== Round 2 ===
Bouts

Winner	Nation	Victory Type	Loser	Nation
Husein Mehmedov	Bulgaria	Fall	Taisto Kangasniemi	Finland
Hossein Nouri	Iran	Decision, 3–0	John Da Silva	New Zealand
Ivan Vykhristyuk	Soviet Union	Decision, 3–0	Ken Richmond	Great Britain
Hamit Kaplan	Turkey	Fall	Lila Ram	India
Bill Kerslake	United States	Fall	Ray Mitchell	Australia
Saburo Nakao	Japan	Bye	N/A	N/A

Points

Rank	Wrestler	Nation	Start	Earned	Total
1	Hamit Kaplan	Turkey	1	0	1
1	Husein Mehmedov	Bulgaria	1	0	1
3	Ivan Vykhristyuk	Soviet Union	1	1	2
4	Taisto Kangasniemi	Finland	0	3	3
4	Bill Kerslake	United States	3	0	3
4	Saburo Nakao	Japan	3	0	3
7	Ray Mitchell	Australia	1	3	4
7	Hossein Nouri	Iran	3	1	4
7	Ken Richmond	Great Britain	1	3	4
10	John Da Silva	New Zealand	3	3	6
10	Lila Ram	India	3	3	6

=== Round 3 ===
Bouts

Winner	Nation	Victory Type	Loser	Nation
Taisto Kangasniemi	Finland	Fall	Saburo Nakao	Japan
Husein Mehmedov	Bulgaria	Decision, 3–0	Ivan Vykhristyuk	Soviet Union
Hamit Kaplan	Turkey	Fall	Hossein Nouri	Iran
Ken Richmond	Great Britain	Fall	Bill Kerslake	United States
Ray Mitchell	Australia	Bye	N/A	N/A

Points

Rank	Wrestler	Nation	Start	Earned	Total
1	Hamit Kaplan	Turkey	1	0	1
2	Husein Mehmedov	Bulgaria	1	1	2
3	Taisto Kangasniemi	Finland	3	0	3
4	Ray Mitchell	Australia	4	0	4
4	Ken Richmond	Great Britain	4	0	4
6	Ivan Vykhristyuk	Soviet Union	2	3	5
7	Bill Kerslake	United States	3	3	6
7	Saburo Nakao	Japan	3	3	6
9	Hossein Nouri	Iran	4	3	7

=== Round 4 ===
Bouts

Winner	Nation	Victory Type	Loser	Nation
Taisto Kangasniemi	Finland	Fall	Ray Mitchell	Australia
Husein Mehmedov	Bulgaria	Decision, 3–0	Ken Richmond	Great Britain
Hamit Kaplan	Turkey	Bye	N/A	N/A

Points

Rank	Wrestler	Nation	Start	Earned	Total
1	Hamit Kaplan	Turkey	1	0	1
2	Taisto Kangasniemi	Finland	3	0	3
2	Husein Mehmedov	Bulgaria	2	1	3
4	Ray Mitchell	Australia	4	3	7
4	Ken Richmond	Great Britain	4	3	7

=== Medal rounds ===
Mekhmedov's victory over Kangasniemi in round 2 counted for the medal rounds. That victory essentially decided the silver medal, as Kaplan defeated both of the other two wrestlers to take the gold medal.

Bouts

Winner	Nation	Victory Type	Loser	Nation
Hamit Kaplan	Turkey	Decision, 3–0	Husein Mehmedov	Bulgaria
Hamit Kaplan	Turkey	Decision, 3–0	Taisto Kangasniemi	Finland

Points

Rank	Wrestler	Nation	Wins	Losses
1st place, gold medalist(s)	Hamit Kaplan	Turkey	2	0
2nd place, silver medalist(s)	Husein Mehmedov	Bulgaria	1	1
3rd place, bronze medalist(s)	Taisto Kangasniemi	Finland	0	2
