= Alfred Tischendorf =

German wrestler

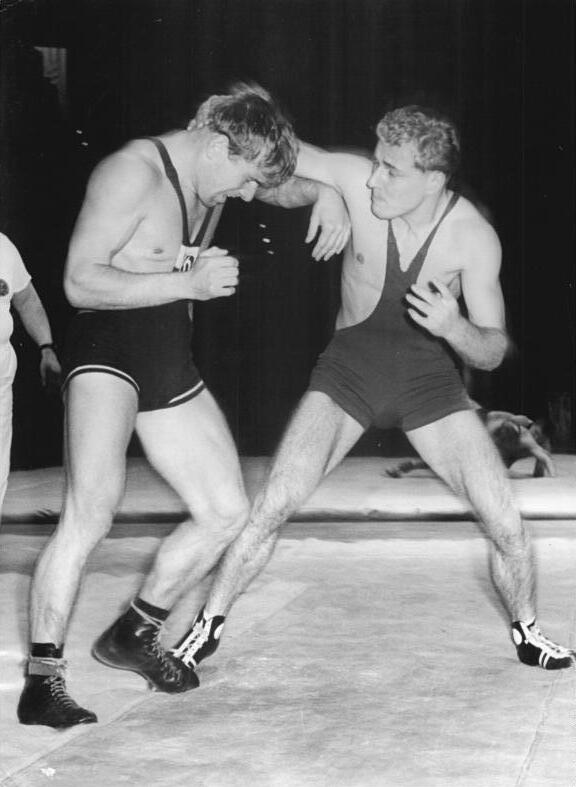
- Tischendorf (right) in 1957

Personal information
- Born: 26 November 1934 (age 91) Eisenberg, Germany

Sport
- Sport: Wrestling

Alfred Tischendorf (born 26 November 1934) is a German wrestler. He competed in the men's freestyle welterweight at the 1956 Summer Olympics.
