= Jay Holt =

American wrestler (1923–2012)

Personal information
- Born: June 15, 1923 San Francisco, California, U.S.
- Died: March 26, 2012 (aged 88) Las Vegas, Nevada, U.S.

Sport
- Sport: Wrestling
- Events: Greco-Roman and Freestyle

Jay Holt (June 15, 1923 – March 26, 2012) was an American wrestler. He competed in the men's Greco-Roman welterweight at the 1956 Summer Olympics.
