= Mitsuo Ikeda =

Japanese wrestler (1935–2002)

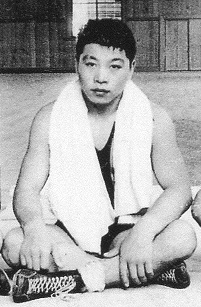

Personal information
- Born: 14 March 1935 Mashike, Hokkaido, Japan
- Died: 12 September 2002 (aged 67) Tokyo, Japan

Sport
- Sport: Freestyle wrestling
Medal record
Men's freestyle wrestling
Representing Japan
Olympic Games
Gold medal – first place	1956 Melbourne	Welterweight

Mitsuo Ikeda (池田 三男, Ikeda Mitsuo; 14 March 1935 – 12 September 2002) was a Japanese freestyle wrestler who won a gold medal at the 1956 Olympics. Later he worked as a wrestling coach.
