= Ken Mantell =

American professional wrestler

Personal information
- Born: Ken Lusk Fort Worth, Texas, U.S.
- Family: Johnny Mantell (brother)

Professional wrestling career
- Ring name(s): Ken Mantell; Ken Lusk; Clay Spencer
- Billed height: 5 ft 11 in (180 cm)
- Billed weight: 224 lb (102 kg)
- Debut: 1970
- Retired: 1991

Ken Lusk, better known by his ring name Ken Mantell, is an American retired professional wrestler, promoter and booker who competed throughout the National Wrestling Alliance in the 1970s and 1980s. He is a former NWA World Junior Heavyweight Champion, having defeated Danny Hodge, and won the NWA World Tag Team Championship with Ron Bass in November 1975. He worked as the booker of World Class Championship Wrestling during its peak years and, as a promoter, formed the Wild West Wrestling promotion, which merged with World Class when he became part-owner in early 1988.

== Professional wrestling career ==
=== Early career (1970–1973) ===
Both Ken and his brother Johnny Mantell (who was also a professional wrestler) started amateur wrestling while in high school in California, before moving to Texas. Mantell began his career in Florida in 1970, wrestling under his real name. He established himself working for Championship Wrestling From Florida and soon began working the NWA Tri-State territory, where he won the NWA United States Tag Team Championship with Tom Jones on August 21, 1972, defeating Bobby Hart and Lorenzo Parente. The following year, Mantell wrestled for Big Time Wrestling in Portland under the ring name "Clay Spencer", where he captured the NWA Pacific Northwest Tag Team Championship with Bull Ramos in July 1973.

=== NWA World Junior Heavyweight Champion (1973–1975) ===
On December 19, 1973, Mantell faced six time and then-current NWA World Junior Heavyweight Champion Danny Hodge in Jackson, Mississippi. Hodge, a 1956 Olympic silver medalist, had been champion for almost two years when he was defeated by Mantell, who went on to reign as World Junior Heavyweight Champion for the next year and a half. Mantell was a popular title holder and - as a world champion - defended the title throughout the National Wrestling Alliance. He feuded with wrestlers including Skandar Akbar in Kansas, Don Fargo in Utah, Bob Orton Jr in Fort Worth and Jack Lanza in Dallas. Mantell eventually lost the title to Hiro Matsuda in St. Petersburg, Florida on June 14, 1975. Danny Hodge would go on to defeat Matsuda for the title, becoming a seven-time champion. He retired as champion on March 15, 1976 after a car accident thus making Mantell the last person to ever defeat Hodge for the championship.

=== Tag Team success (1975–1976) ===
Five months after losing the World Junior Heavyweight Championship Mantell won gold again, when he and Ron Bass won the NWA World Tag Team Championship in November 1975. They defended the titles in the Central States Wrestling territory before dropping the belts in February the following year. Mantell then travelled to NWA: Georgia and again found tag team success, winning the NWA Georgia Tag Team Championship with former WWWF World Tag Team Champion Dean Ho on July 2, 1976.

=== Heavyweight title victories (1976–1980) ===
Having been a junior heavyweight competitor for most of his career, Mantell competed as a heavyweight for the later part of the 1970s. He won the NWA Americas Heavyweight Championship on October 15, 1976 in the Los Angeles territory, when he defeated Chavo Guerrero. The pair had a memorable rivalry for the Americas Championship for the following year, with Guerrero eventually recapturing the gold. Following this, Mantell travelled to the NWA Gulf Coast territory, where he became the NWA Gulf Coast Heavyweight Champion on March 22, 1977, defeating Wrestling Pro in Mobile, Alabama. Mantell and Pro would headline several events for the territory, feuding over the title in 1976-77, when Wrestling Pro eventually recapturing the championship in Dothan. Mantell captured his final title in wrestling on July 25, 1980 when he defeated Wahoo McDaniel in a tournament final to become the NWA Mid-South Louisiana Heavyweight Champion in Shreveport, Louisiana.

=== Booking for WCCW and the UWF (1980–1987) ===
Towards the end of his in-ring career, Mantell began to transition to a backstage role, working as a booker and valued "brainstormer" in the territory he was perhaps most famous for wrestling with; World Class out of Dallas and Fort Worth. Mantell was highly respected by the locker room and promoter Fritz Von Erich and was often thought of as Von Erich's "go to guy" after the passing of Fritz's son, David, in February 1984.

In May 1986, Mid-South promoter Bill Watts set his sights on a national expansion in the same vein as Vince McMahon's World Wrestling Federation and Jim Crockett Promotions. One of his first acts was to hire Ken Mantell away from Von Erich's World Class, with the expectation that Mantell could bring across World Class fans and talent to the renamed Universal Wrestling Federation (UWF). Mantell was successful and many former WCCW wrestlers would soon join the UWF, including the Fabulous Freebirds, Chris Adams, Missy Hyatt, Skandor Akbar, the Missing Link, Kamala and the One Man Gang. By the later half of 1986, the 1980s oil glut had hit Texas hard with many job losses in the WCCW markets of Dallas and Fort Worth, resulting in declining attendance at World Class events. A serious accident to WCCW's top star Kerry Von Erich kept him out of action for a year and a half, which effectively lead to World Class's major decline, only a few months out from still being a highly successful territory

=== Wild West Wrestling and ownership of WCCW (1987–1988) ===
It wasn't long before the oil recession hit Bill Watts in Oklahoma and he eventually sold the UWF to Jim Crockett in 1987. Mantell went on to form his own promotion based in the Dallas/Fort Worth territory called "Wild West Wrestling". Mantell continued on as a wrestler in Wild West, having notable feuds with wrestlers including Cocoa Samoa. The promotion was a direct rival to World Class, which still ran events in the area, albeit on a small scale than it had in its heyday.

Wild West Wrestling merged with World Class in 1988 when Mantell became part-owner of World Class after Fritz Von Erich sold his once highly prosperous promotion to his sons Kevin and Kerry and to Mantell. Wild West was kept on as a syndicated television "B-show" to complement WCCW on ESPN. Wild West TV tapings, though, would become rare and often consisted of WCCW footage. Meanwhile, Crockett's circuit was sold to Ted Turner and eventually became World Championship Wrestling. By the early 1990s, Watts was the WCW president. The new era of World Class was to be short-lived. With WCCW unable to reach the heights it once had, the promotion was sold to Tennessee promoter Jerry Jarrett at the request of Kerry Von Erich.

Ken Mantell has since largely retired from the professional wrestling business. His brother "Cowboy" Johnny Mantell is the current president of the Professional Wrestling Hall of Fame and Museum in its new location of Wichita Falls, Texas.

== Championships and accomplishments ==
- Georgia Championship Wrestling
  - NWA Georgia Tag Team Championship (1 time) - with Dean Ho
- Gulf Coast Championship Wrestling
  - NWA Gulf Coast Heavyweight Championship (1 time)
- Mid-South Wrestling
  - Mid-South Louisiana Championship (1 time)
- NWA Hollywood Wrestling
  - NWA Americas Heavyweight Championship (1 time)
- NWA Tri-State
  - NWA United States Tag Team Championship (Tri-State version) (1 time) - with Jay Clayton (wrestler) (1) and Tom Jones (1)
  - NWA World Junior Heavyweight Championship (1 time)
- Pacific Northwest Wrestling
  - NWA Pacific Northwest Tag Team Championship (1 time) - Bull Ramos
