= Ernie Fischer =

American wrestler (1930–2019)

Personal information
- Born: July 12, 1930 Baltimore, Maryland, U.S.
- Died: April 18, 2019 (aged 88)

Sport
- Sport: Wrestling

Ernie Fischer (July 12, 1930 – April 20, 2019) was an American wrestler. He competed in the men's freestyle welterweight at the 1956 Summer Olympics.
