= Vladimir Maneev =

Russian Greco-Roman wrestler

Personal information
- Born: 5 February 1932 Stalinsk, West Siberian Krai, RSFSR, Soviet Union
- Died: 8 January 1985 (aged 52) Novokuznetsk, Kemerovo Oblast, RSFSR, Soviet Union
- Weight: 73 kg (161 lb)

Sport
- Sport: Greco-Roman wrestling
- Club: Metallurg Novokuznetsk
Medal record
Representing the Soviet Union
Olympic Games
Silver medal – second place	1956 Melbourne	73 kg
World Championships
Gold medal – first place	1955 Karlsruhe	87 kg
World Cup
Gold medal – first place	1956 Istanbul	73 kg

Vladimir Petrovich Maneev (Russian: Владимир Петрович Манеев; 5 February 1932 – 8 January 1985) was a Soviet and Russian Greco-Roman wrestler. He won the world welterweight title in 1955 and placed second at the 1956 Summer Olympics.

Maneev took up wrestling in 1948 while working as a machinist in a metallurgy plant. He won the Soviet welterweight titles in 1954–55, placing second in 1952 and 1956. Besides his 1955 world title he also won the 1956 World Cup. After the Olympics, he switched to middleweight and then light-heavyweight, but his only major achievements in the heavier weights was silver medal at the 1962 national championships. He retired in 1976.

Maneev graduated from the Siberian Metallurgic Institute with a mining degree in 1959, and in 1960–68 worked as a mine foreman, and later as section head at the Ordzhonikidze coal mine near his native Novokuznetsk. From 1968 to 1985 he took various positions at the Listvyansky coal mining quarry. He died of a heart attack aged 52. Since 2006 a memorial tournament in his honor has been held in Novokuznetsk.
