= Danny Hodge =

American boxer and wrestler (1932–2020)

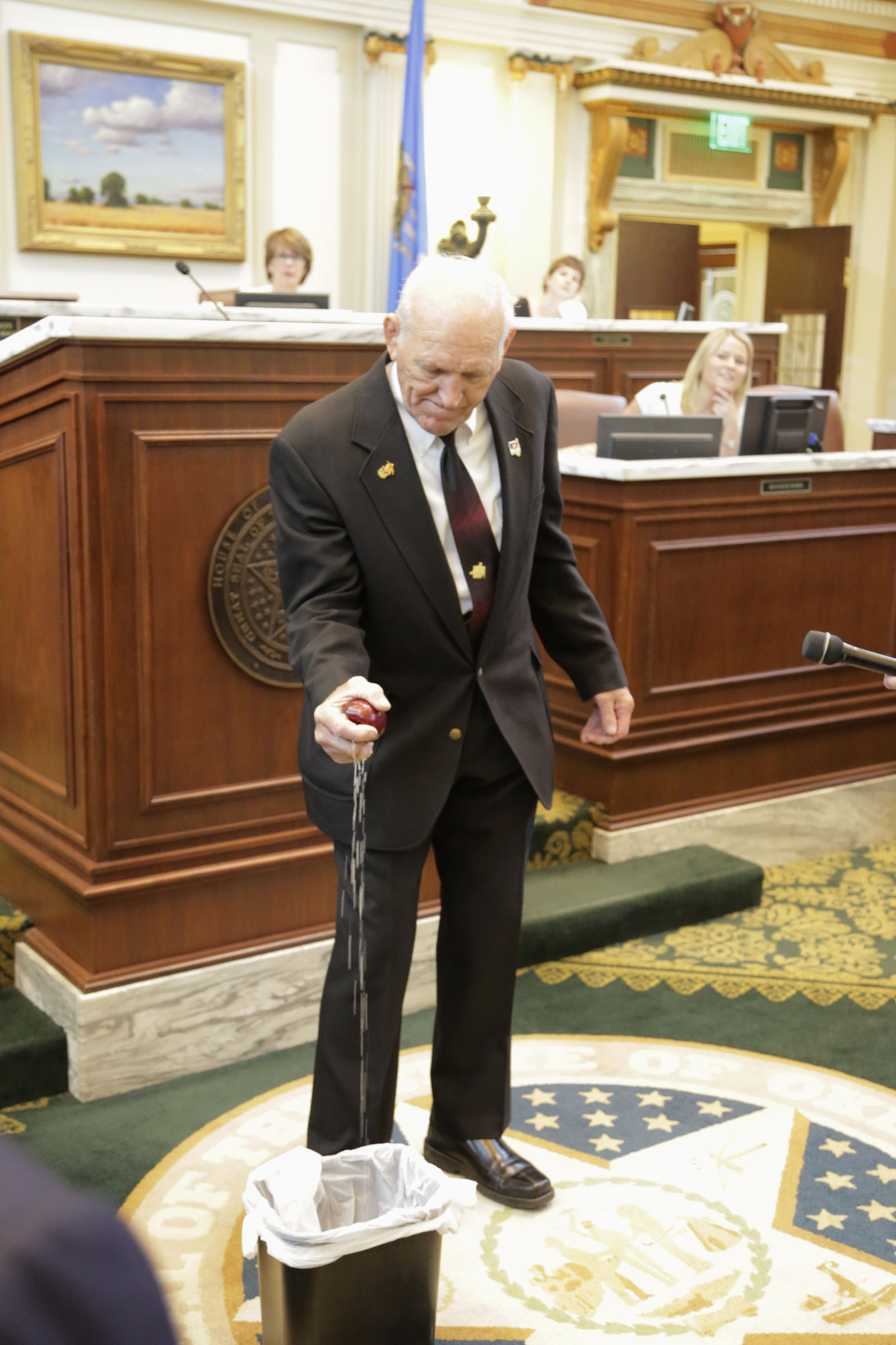
- Hodge, then aged 80, crushing an apple with one hand at the Oklahoma House of Representatives in 2013

Personal information
- Full name: Dan Allen Hodge
- Born: May 13, 1932 Perry, Oklahoma, U.S.
- Died: December 24, 2020 (aged 88) Perry, Oklahoma, U.S.
Medal record
Men's freestyle wrestling
Representing the United States
Olympic Games
Silver medal – second place	1956 Melbourne	79 kg
Collegiate Wrestling
Representing the Oklahoma Sooners
NCAA Championships
Gold medal – first place	1955 Ithaca	177 lb
Gold medal – first place	1956 Stillwater	177 lb
Gold medal – first place	1957 Pittsburgh	177 lb
Big Seven Championships
Gold medal – first place	1955 Colorado	177 lb
Gold medal – first place	1956 Iowa State	177 lb
Gold medal – first place	1957 East Oklahoma	177 lb
Freestyle Wrestling
AAU National Freestyle Championships
Gold medal – first place	1953 New York	174 lb
Gold medal – first place	1954 San Diego	174 lb
Gold medal – first place	1956 Tulsa	174 lb
Greco-Roman wrestling
AAU National Greco-Roman Championships
Gold medal – first place	1956 Tulsa	174 lb
Men's amateur boxing
US Intercity Golden Gloves
Gold medal – first place	New York 1958	Heavyweight

Dan Allen Hodge (May 13, 1932 – December 24, 2020) was an American amateur and professional wrestler, who also had a brief professional boxing career. He is in both the U.S. amateur wrestling Hall of Fame, for his three NCAA titles and Olympic silver medal, and the pro wrestling Hall of Fame, as a seven-time NWA World Junior Heavyweight Champion. The Dan Hodge Trophy is the college wrestling equivalent of the Heisman Trophy.

Hodge was born and raised in Perry, Oklahoma, where he continued to live. He was famous for the ability to crush apples with one hand, a feat which he demonstrated live on ESPN during the 2006 NCAA Wrestling Championships. He said his strength was due to having double tendons in his hands.

== Early life ==
Dan Allen Hodge was born and raised in Perry, Oklahoma, the son of an alcoholic father and a mother who dealt with severe depression. His home burned down when he was 9, and his mother suffered severe burns over 70 percent of her body, necessitating 52 blood transfusions. Hodge was raised by his grandfather, who drank a lot and beat Hodge frequently. He also worked at a Conoco gas station.

== Amateur wrestling career ==
Hodge started wrestling by the age of 13. At Perry High School in Oklahoma, Hodge won the 165-pound title at the state tournament in 1951. As a collegiate wrestler for the University of Oklahoma, Hodge was undefeated at 46–0, with 36 pins and reportedly was never taken off his feet during his collegiate career. He was a three-time Big Seven conference champ at 177 pounds (1955–1957), and won the 177-pound title at the NCAA championships those same three years, pinning all three of his finals opponents. In addition to his collegiate wrestling career, Hodge also won three Amateur Athletic Union (AAU) national championships in freestyle wrestling, as well as winning one in Greco-Roman wrestling in 1956 at 174 pounds. He was the first and to date only amateur wrestler to be featured on the cover of Sports Illustrated.

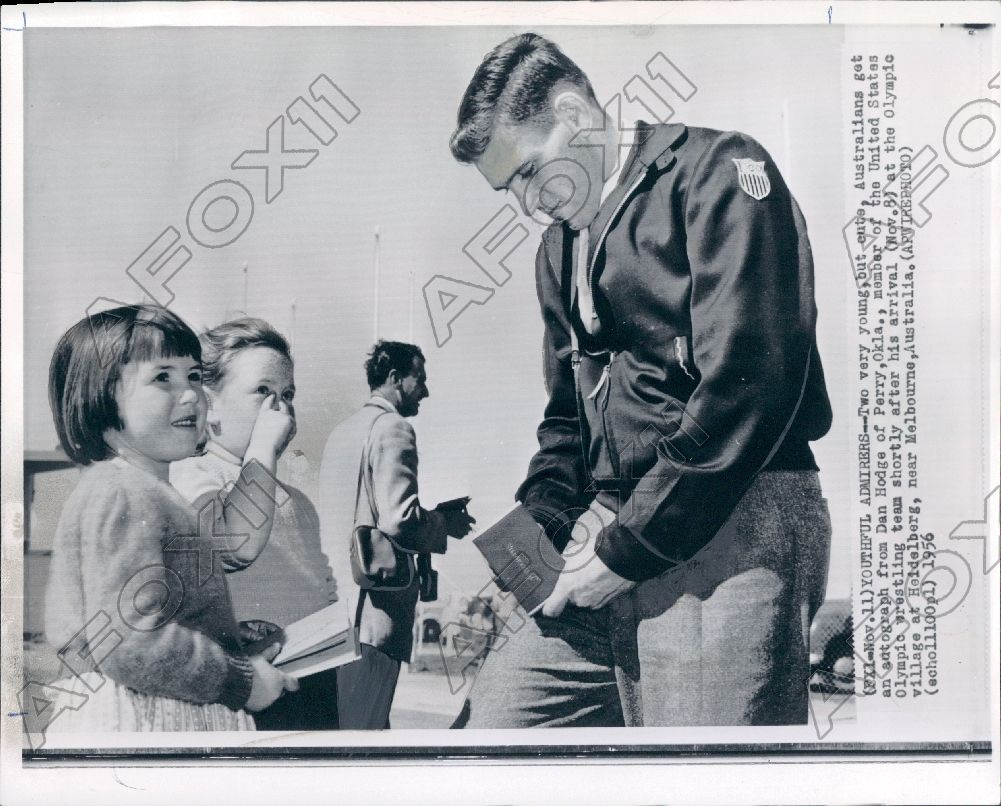
Hodge in 1956

His reputation as a high school wrestler preceded him when he joined the US Navy in 1951. At Ames, Iowa, in April 1952, Hodge survived the US Olympic Trials, and was coached by Naval Academy Instructor Ray Swartz in the 174-pound division. Hodge finished outside the top seven in the Helsinki Olympics freestyle middleweight, losing two of his three bouts. Going into May 1956 wrestling trials for the US Olympic team, Hodge was the middleweight favorite. He was eliminated on May 2 by William Smith, who was embroiled in controversy with the Central AAU. At the Melbourne Olympics freestyle middleweight, he won the silver medal, losing the final to Bulgarian Nikola Stanchev.

The Dan Hodge Trophy, named after him, is the college wrestling equivalent of the Heisman Trophy.

== Boxing career ==
Danny won the 1958 Chicago Golden Gloves at Heavyweight, then won a Chicago Intercity bout in October, beating Charley Hood. He finished his amateur career with 17 wins, no losses and 12 KO's. Convinced by boxing manager Art Freeman that he was a better prospect than Rocky Marciano, Hodge decided to become a professional boxer rather than pursue the opportunity to compete as a boxer and a wrestler at the 1960 Summer Olympics in Rome. In his professional boxing debut, he scored a first-round knockout victory over Norm Jackson. As a professional, he had a reported record of 8–2, although only 7 wins have been documented. He retired on July 9, 1959.

== Professional wrestling career ==
Danny Hodge
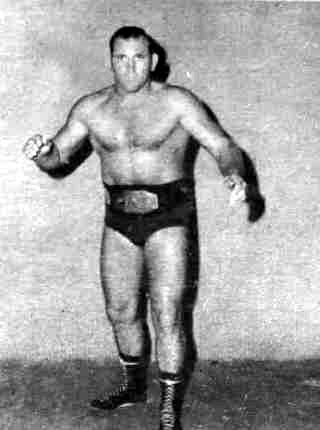
- Hodge in 1972

Professional wrestling career
- Ring name: Danny Hodge
- Billed height: 6 ft 0 in (183 cm)
- Billed weight: 227 lb (103 kg)
- Trained by: Ed "Strangler" Lewis; Leroy McGuirk
- Debut: October 7, 1959
- Retired: September 1, 1983

Trained by Leroy McGuirk and Ed "Strangler" Lewis, Hodge made his debut as a professional wrestler on October 9, 1959. Hodge's first major feud was with National Wrestling Alliance Junior Heavyweight Champion Angelo Savoldi. Hodge's father entered the ring during a boxing match on May 27, 1960, between Hodge and Savoldi, and stabbed Savoldi with a penknife. Savoldi required 70 stitches at a local hospital, while Hodge's father was arrested. On July 22, 1960, Hodge defeated Savoldi for the NWA World Junior Heavyweight Championship at the Stockyards Coliseum in Oklahoma City. Hodge became McGuirk's principal headliner, and by 1962, Hodge was making upwards of $80,000 a year.

Hodge was a perennial NWA World Junior Heavyweight Champion, holding the title eight times for a total of over ten years, longer than anyone else. After holding the title for over four years, he eventually dropped the title to longtime rival Hiro Matsuda. Six months later, he defeated Matsuda to regain the title. He held the belt for several months until he lost it to Lorenzo Parente; they both continuously lost and regained the title in the span of a year during their feud. After Parente lost the belt to Hodge again, Hodge held the belt for another four months until eventually losing it to Sputnik Monroe on July 13, 1970. Once again regaining the title a few months later, Hodge found himself as an ex-champion again when he eventually faced Roger Kirby. He was separated from the title until he defeated Dr. X, who was holding the title, and Hodge held his title once again for two more years before being upset by Ken Mantell on December 19, 1973. Mantell eventually lost the title to Hiro Matsuda, Hodge's rival; Hodge defeated him for the championship on March 2, 1976.

On March 15, 1976, after wrestling that evening in Houma, Hodge was driving his car when he fell asleep at the wheel causing him to crash through a bridge and into a lake. The car flipped, and the crash broke his neck and shattered his teeth upon impact. Hodge was able to escape by punching out his car window and safely swimming back to shore. He was then transported to a hospital, and the injuries sustained in the accident caused his retirement from professional wrestling.

On September 1, 1983, Hodge returned to the ring, facing against SWCW USA Junior Heavyweight Champion Eric Embry, which Embry won.

In 2007, Hodge was inducted into the Professional Wrestling Hall of Fame. He made appearances in WWE on Raw in 2005 and 2012 in which he honored his close friends and fellow Oklahoman Jim Ross. WWE Hall of Famer and seven-time world champion Bret Hart has referred to Hodge as "one of the greatest wrestlers in pro wrestling or amateur wrestling there’s ever been", and described being in the same room as Hodge at the 2008 National Wrestling Hall of Fame and Museum's award ceremony as "a big, big honor for me".

== Personal life ==
Hodge and his wife, Dolores, had three children.

On March 29, 2005, Hodge was honored by Oklahoma state lawmakers as an "Oklahoma Sports Hero". He served as chairman of the Oklahoma Professional Boxing Commission, which regulates professional boxing, wrestling, and mixed martial arts in Oklahoma. There is a statue in his honor at the Perry Wrestling Monument Park in Oklahoma.

== Death ==
Hodge died at the age of 88 on December 24, 2020. He had been suffering from dementia.

== Championships and accomplishments ==
- Cauliflower Alley Club
  - Art Abrams Lifetime Achievement Award (2004)
  - Lou Thesz Award (2007)
  - Other honoree (1998)
- George Tragos/Lou Thesz Professional Wrestling Hall of Fame
  - Class of 2000
- International Professional Wrestling Hall of Fame
  - Class of 2021
- American Wrestling Association
  - Nebraska Tag Team Championship(1 time ) - with Reggie Parks
- Japan Wrestling Association
  - NWA International Tag Team Championship – with Wilbur Snyder
- National Wrestling Hall of Fame
  - Distinguished Member (class of 1976)
- National Wrestling Alliance
  - NWA Hall of Fame (class of 2010)
- NWA Mid-America
  - NWA United States Tag Team Championship (Mid-America Version) (1 time) – with Lester Welch
- Trans-World Wrestling Association
  - TWWA Championship (1 time)
- NWA Tri-State
  - NWA North American Heavyweight Championship (Tri-State version) (3 times)
  - NWA United States Tag Team Championship (Tri-State version) (5 times) – with Skandor Akbar (2), Lorenzo Parente (1), Luke Brown (1), and Jay Clayton (1)
  - NWA World Junior Heavyweight Championship (7 times)
- Pro Wrestling Illustrated
  - PWI Stanley Weston Award (1996)
- Professional Wrestling Hall of Fame and Museum
  - Class of 2007
- Wrestling Observer Newsletter
  - Wrestling Observer Newsletter Hall of Fame (Class of 1996)
