= Evelin Banev =

Bulgarian businessperson (born 1964)

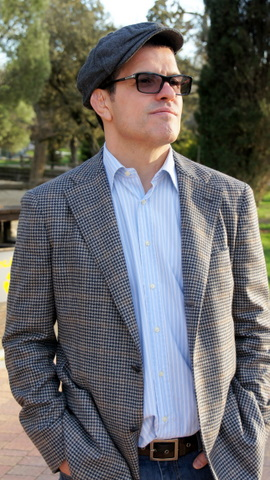
- Banev in 2011
- Born: Evelin Nikolov Banev; October 8, 1964 (age 61); Burgas, Bulgaria
- Other name: Brendo
- Known for: Multiple criminal drug trafficking convictions; victim of kidnapping of daughter

Evelin Banev (Bulgarian: Евелин Банев; October 8, 1964), also known by his nickname Brendo (Bulgarian: Брендо) is a real estate developer, published writer, and former wrestler who has been convicted of money laundering and drug trafficking.

Banev became known for his imprisonment and multiple criminal prosecutions for money laundering and drug trafficking in Bulgaria and Italy. In July 2014, the Sofia Court of Appeal acquitted Banev of all criminal charges against him and overturned a seven and a half year sentence issued previously by the Sofia City Court. In September 2015, Italy's Supreme Court of Cassation annulled his 20-year prison term for drug trafficking and returned the case for retrial to the Appellate Court of Milan. Banev's prosecutions, criminal activities, and imprisonment have been highly controversial and politicized. During his imprisonment, Banev's 10-year-old daughter was abducted and freed after almost two months in captivity.

In 2015, Banev self-published a book titled I Gaze Upon the Soul of Bulgaria, which he wrote during his time in prison. His second book, My truth (Part I) was published in 2016.

On June 24, 2024, Banev voluntarily turned himself in to the Bulgarian authorities in Sofia.

== Early life and education ==
Banev was born in Burgas, Bulgaria.

Since 1985, when he enrolled to the National Sports Academy, Brendo has lived in Sofia. During his time at the academy, Banev frequently traveled to international camps, tournaments and wrestling competitions representing his club "Academic - Sofia" and the Bulgarian National Wrestling Team. Banev has been awarded the "Master of Sport" title in Bulgaria and wrestled in the 74 kg category, under the instruction of Dimitar Dobrev.

== Entrepreneurship ==
After the 1989 political changes in Eastern Europe, Banev spent most of his time outside of Bulgaria. During that time, Banev accumulated his fortune during the Dot-com bubble. He is also a real estate investor and entrepreneur involved in multiple projects in Bulgaria's riviera and capital.

== Criminal prosecutions ==
In April 2007, the Sofia City Prosecutor indicted Banev for organizing a criminal group and money laundering. Subsequently, Banev was arrested and released on bail.

Banev's case caused a media stir again in 2008, when Switzerland agreed to lift its bank secrecy and to submit bank documentation to the Bulgarian authorities. Later, it was made public, that in its requests for judicial assistance to Switzerland, the Bulgarian Prosecutor's Office has sent false information – i.e. stating that Banev is accused of drug trafficking and distribution rather than of money laundering.

As of May 2012, Banev's case was still pending with court hearings being postponed at the request of the prosecution. In relation to the case, various Bulgarian media and EU commission reports commented on the groundless accusations and the abuse of power by the prosecution. At this time, the Bulgarian authorities initiated operation "Cocaine Kings" with an overwhelming media coverage, including a press conference with the Italian authorities. During the operation, some 30 people were arrested, including Banev. Banev was accused of financing drug trafficking between South America and Europe, and Italy claimed responsibility for criminally charging him.

Following operation "Cocaine Kings", Italy requested a temporary extradition of Banev, which he and his legal team fought. However, the Bulgarian Court of Appeals confirmed Banev's 1-year extradition to Italy on July 17, 2012, with the condition that he will be returned to Bulgaria when needed for his money laundering trial. The extradition hearing was not without controversy, as the court denied Banev's right to appoint a new defense attorney and rejected the request of the publicly appointed attorney for more time to familiarize herself with the case. Banev was extradited to Italy on July 26, 2012.

In February 2013, Sofia City Court sentenced Banev to 7 1/2 years in prison, while acquitting the other 3 people accused with him. Banev's lawyer, Ina Lulcheva, said that the appeal against the finding of the Sofia City Court would be based on a lack of evidence justifying the conviction. That the group had travelled together made them at most a tour group, not an organised crime group, she said. The defense further stated:

"I will not comment on the length of the sentence. The defense pleaded that there is no crime, as such the punishment is not significant. In this case, it is indicative that it was established that there is money laundered from a person, who has never even been questioned or interrogated. We have not asked that he is questioned, because there is no evidence that he has any connections with the defendants; the prosecution did not want his questioning, because in my opinion, they knew that their accusation would not be confirmed. As such, the court accepted that money is laundered from the activity of a person and his group, without even questioning this person".

After a 4-month trial, in July 2013, the Milan City Court sentenced Banev to 20 years in prison for participating in a criminal organization for international drug trafficking. Banev's defense attorney stated that, "Banev has not even entered Italy" and that there is not one evidence linking him to the charges. Before the court, his attorney pointed out that all of the Milan prosecutor evidence was coming from Bulgaria, not from Italy - in Italy, Banev was never under surveillance, wiretapped, followed, or investigated. The Italian judge who sentenced Banev, stated in an interview with a prominent Bulgarian newspaper that he highly recommends that Banev appeals the sentencing because "until now not a single evidence of Banev's guilt has been deposited; Banev has never been caught in the act of crime, and he was sentenced only by the testimonies (which were presumed truthful) of other defendants".

Following the trial, Banev was returned to Bulgaria, where in July 2014, the Sofia Court of Appeal ruled him "not guilty" of money laundering and released him on probation.

On September 22, 2015, Italy's Supreme Court of Cassation annulled Banev's 20-year prison term for drug trafficking and ordered a retrial to the Appellate Court of Milan. Italy's Supreme Court of Cassation upheld the sentences of all other people convicted under the "Cocaine Kings" affair. The court cited that Banev's unjust conviction was due to lack of any evidence and irregularities in the use of facts. In annulling his 20-year conviction, the court reported that Banev's net worth and political neutrality had led to "antagonisms that motivated incorrect assessment of [his] personality".

On June 24, 2024, at 7:30 in the morning, Banev surrendered voluntarily to serve his sentence. The 59-year-old Banev was accompanied by Attorney Peter Zafirov. Prepared, Banev carried a huge bag, presumably with personal belongings. Banev identified himself to a reporter and confirmed that he, "realizes very well what he is doing". Thereafter, he took out his Bulgarian identity card, as well as the necessary documents to identify himself to the guards at the prison checkpoint. The employees of the General Directorate of Execution of Punishments were among the most surprised. The authorities and the ministry of internal affairs were equally surprised and unprepared for this voluntary action by Banev.

== Counter-allegations ==
Banev said that he was invited in writing to a meeting with the Interior Minister, Rumen Petkov, who requested Brendo's assistance – i.e. to falsely testify against “the Margin” brothers. According to Banev, his refusal to cooperate with the Minister is the main reason behind the 2007 charges for money laundering against him.

== Kidnapping of Banev's daughter ==
Banev's ten-year-old daughter, Lara, was kidnapped by three masked men at about 7:30 am on March 5, 2013, while leaving her home in Sofia. The men shot her unarmed driver twice in the back. It was the first kidnapping in Bulgaria since 2009. The motives behind the kidnapping were the cause for much speculation. In a televised press conference three days later, Chief Prosecutor Sotir Tsatsarov stated that, "The kidnapping of Lara is a message to Brendo".

Lara Baneva was released, physically unharmed, on April 21, 2013; she was left in front of a police station in Sofia at approximately 10:00 pm. It was reported, but unconfirmed, that the kidnappers had originally demanded a €10 million ransom, but later agreed to free her in exchange of €530,000.

== Books ==
In March 2015, Evelin Banev self-published a novel titled I Gaze Upon the Soul of Bulgaria, which he wrote while in prison. The spiritual novel is about the journey to self-discovery and realization as passed on by the main character, Max, after a 20-year imprisonment, to his daughter Anna. Banev is also the artist of the book cover - an illustration of two mandalas.

His second book, My Truth (Part I) was published in 2016. It is a collection of essays on various topics, ranging from Education, to Politics, to Interpersonal Relationships. In the description, Brendo writes, "'My Truth' heralds my self-overcoming, which I share even at the risk of having the bitter taste of my creative innovation... In this book I state only and only what the truth is for myself in a world where everything is an end, because I think deeply about whether the necessary means to achieve this end are necessarily true."
