= Johnny Mantell =

American professional wrestler

Personal information
- Born: John Lusk; November 27, 1957 (age 68) Chino, California, U.S.
- Family: Ken Mantell (brother)

Professional wrestling career
- Ring name(s): Johnny Mantell; The Hood; Johnny Mann; Destroyer #1
- Billed height: 6 ft 1 in (185 cm)
- Billed weight: 245 lb (111 kg)
- Debut: 1977
- Retired: 2005

John Lusk, better known by his ring name Johnny Mantell, is an American retired professional wrestler, and current president of the Professional Wrestling Hall of Fame and Museum who competed in Texas between the late 1970s and early 1990s for World Class Championship Wrestling and Global Wrestling Federation, Mid-South and Japan. He was also known as The Hood in California.

== Professional wrestling career ==
Mantell began his wrestling career in 1977 in Louisiana while attending university studying Physical Education.

In 1978, he went on his first tour of Japan working for New Japan Pro Wrestling. He did two more tours in 1979 and 1980.

In 1979, Mantell worked in Vancouver and Portland for Pacific Northwest Wrestling. Mantell teamed up with his brother Ken Mantell in 1980 for Mid-South Wrestling.

Mantell, began using a gimmick, The Hood a masked wrestler for NWA Hollywood Wrestling in 1980. He won the NWA Americas Heavyweight Championship defeating Chavo Guerrero Sr.

After the Hood gimmick, Mantell left California in 1982 and went to Texas making his debut for World Class Championship Wrestling. On October 31, 1983, Mantell defeated Jimmy Garvin for the WCCW Television Championship where he held it for nearly a month dropping the title to The Super Destroyer on November 28. He would work for World Class until 1988.

In 1983, Mantell returned to Mid-South Wrestling where he worked until 1985.

Mantell returned to Japan in 1984 this time for All Japan Pro Wrestling.

In 1986, Mantell worked as Johnny Mann in the World Wrestling Federation.

After WCCW folded, Mantell went to the new Texas promotion Global Wrestling Federation in 1991 where he teamed with Black Bart as the Rough Riders. they won the GWF Tag Team Championship in October 1992 defeating the Ebony Experience. They dropped the titles a month later to Bobby Duncum Jr and John Hawk.

After leaving GWF in 1993, Mantell worked in the independent circuit. His last known match happened in NWA New Jersey in 1996.

== Personal life ==
After retiring from wrestling, Mantell worked teacher's aide at the high school in Nocona, TX from 1996 to 2000 which allowed him to be a coach or an assistant coach for the football team (defensive line) and girls softball team. He also started the school's first and only wrestling team.

Mantell was in a car accident on November 10, 2005, where he was seriously injured in a one-vehicle roll over accident which forced him to retire from wrestling.

He is also a horse trainer and ranch owner.

Mantell is the current president of the Professional Wrestling Hall of Fame and Museum in its new location of Wichita Falls, Texas since 2015.

== Championships and accomplishments ==
- Global Wrestling Federation
  - GWF Tag Team Championship (1 time) – with Black Bart
- NWA Hollywood Wrestling
  - NWA Americas Heavyweight Championship (1 time)
  - NWA World Tag Team Championship (Los Angeles version) (1 time) - with Ron Starr
- Pro Wrestling Illustrated
  - PWI ranked Mike Jackson # 224 of the 500 best singles wrestlers of the PWI 500 in 1993
- World Class Championship Wrestling
  - WCCW Television Championship (1 time)
