= Siegfried Schäfer =

German wrestler

Personal information
- Nationality: German
- Born: 16 February 1933 (age 93)

Sport
- Sport: Wrestling

Siegfried Schäfer (born 16 February 1933) is a German wrestler. He competed in the men's Greco-Roman welterweight at the 1956 Summer Olympics.
