= William Davies (wrestler) =

Australian wrestler (1931–2020)

Personal information
- Nationality: Australian
- Born: 27 August 1931
- Died: 14 August 2020 (aged 88)

Sport
- Sport: Wrestling

William Davies (27 August 1931 – 14 August 2020) was an Australian wrestler. He competed in the men's freestyle middleweight at the 1956 Summer Olympics.

He was born and raised in Collingwood, Victoria. He started competing in wrestling as an after school sport at the age of 15 years at police boys clubs, including the Glebe Police Boys Club. He joined the Royal Australian Navy at the age of 21, remaining with the Navy until he retired.
