= Wally Paterson =

Australian wrestler

Personal information
- Full name: Warren Walter Paterson
- Nationality: Australian
- Born: 23 June 1928
- Died: 27 July 2006 (aged 78)

Sport
- Sport: Wrestling

Wally Paterson (23 June 1928 – 27 July 2006) was an Australian wrestler. He competed in the men's Greco-Roman middleweight at the 1956 Summer Olympics.
