= Joseph Zammit =

Australian wrestler (1932–2019)

Personal information
- Nationality: Australian
- Born: 29 December 1932
- Died: 15 June 2019 (aged 86)

Sport
- Sport: Wrestling

Joseph Zammit (29 December 1932 – 15 June 2019) was an Australian wrestler. He competed in the men's Greco-Roman heavyweight at the 1956 Summer Olympics.
