= Jim Peckham =

American wrestler (1929–2011)

Personal information
- Full name: James Cameron Peckham
- Born: August 30, 1929 Boston, Massachusetts, U.S.
- Died: August 23, 2011 (aged 81) Braintree, Massachusetts, U.S.

Sport
- Sport: Wrestling
- Event: Greco-Roman

Jim Peckham (August 30, 1929 – August 23, 2011) was an American wrestler and coach. He competed in the men's Greco-Roman middleweight at the 1956 Summer Olympics.

== Biography ==
Peckham was born in Boston, Massachusetts in 1929. Several members of Peckham's family were also wrestlers. His father was a professional in the 1930s, his son wrestled during the 1970s, and his daughter wrestled against Andy Kaufman on Saturday Night Live in 1979. His brother, Tom, also competed at the Olympics, competing in the men's freestyle 87 kg at the 1968 Summer Olympics.

At the 1956 Summer Olympics in Melbourne, Peckham competed in the men's Greco-Roman middleweight event, where he was eliminated in round three (of five). He coached the US wrestling team at the 1972 Summer Olympics and the 1976 Summer Olympics.

After working for an electric company, Peckham became the wrestling coach at Emerson College. He later was the Athletic Director at the college for nearly 30 years. In 1986, he became the wrestling coach at Harvard University.

Peckham was inducted into the National Wrestling Hall of Fame in 2000. He died in August 2011 in Braintree, Massachusetts after suffering from Alzheimer's disease.
