= Adelmo Bulgarelli =

Italian wrestler (1932–1984)

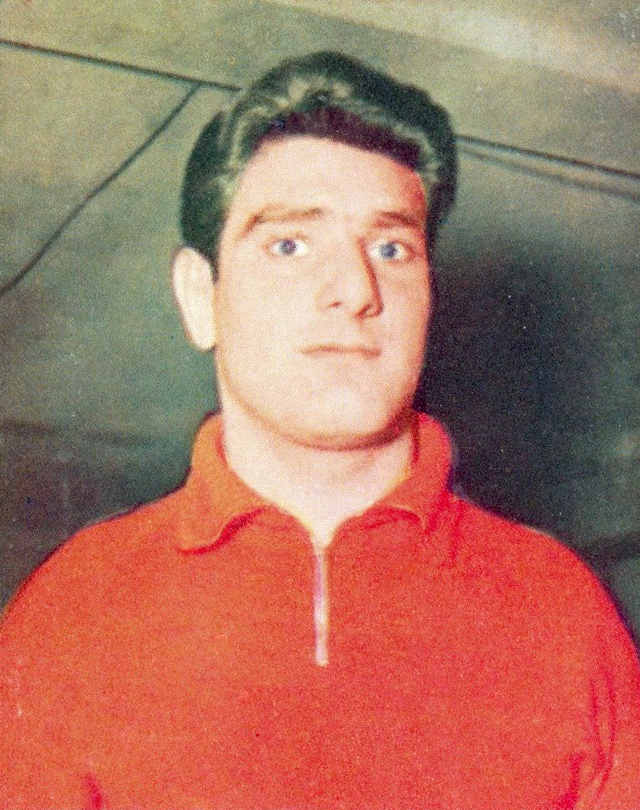

Personal information
- Born: 23 March 1932 Carpi, Italy
- Died: 20 July 1984 (aged 52)
- Height: 184 cm (6 ft 0 in)
- Weight: 101 kg (223 lb)

Sport
- Sport: Greco-Roman wrestling
- Club: FIAT Torino
Medal record
Representing Italy
Olympic Games
Bronze medal – third place	1956 Melbourne	Heavyweight
Mediterranean Games
Gold medal – first place	1963 Naples	Heavyweight
Silver medal – second place	1955 Barcelona	Heavyweight

Adelmo Bulgarelli (23 March 1932 – 20 July 1984) was a heavyweight Greco-Roman wrestler from Italy. He competed in the 1956, 1960 and 1964 Olympics and won a bronze medal in 1956. He also won two medals at the Mediterranean Games in 1955 and 1963 and 11 national titles.
