= Saburo Nakao =

Japanese wrestler

Personal information
- Nationality: Japanese
- Born: 1937
- Died: 29 April 2015 (aged 77–78)

Sport
- Sport: Wrestling

Saburo Nakao (1937 – 29 April 2015) was a Japanese wrestler. He competed in the men's freestyle heavyweight at the 1956 Summer Olympics.
