= Fred Murphy (wrestler) =

Australian wrestler

Personal information
- Nationality: Australian
- Born: 23 August 1924 Corowa, New South Wales, Australia
- Died: 9 October 1983 (aged 59)

Sport
- Sport: Wrestling

Fred Murphy (23 August 1924 – 9 October 1983) was an Australian wrestler. He competed in the men's Greco-Roman welterweight at the 1956 Summer Olympics.
