= İbrahim Zengin =

Turkish wrestler (1931–2013)

Medal record

Representing Turkey

Men's Freestyle wrestling

Olympic Games
Silver medal – second place	1956 Melbourne	73 kg

World Championships
Bronze medal – third place	1951 Helsinki	67 kg

World Cup
Gold medal – first place	1956 Istanbul	73 kg

İbrahim Zengin (1931 – 10 July 2013) was a Turkish wrestler. He was born in Amasya. He won the Olympic silver medal in Freestyle wrestling at his first Olympics in 1956. He also won a bronze medal at the 1951 World Wrestling Championships.
