= Bakshish Singh (wrestler) =

Indian wrestler

Personal information
- Nationality: Indian
- Born: 20 January 1924 Jind

Sport
- Sport: Wrestling

Bakshish Singh (born 20 January 1924) was an Indian wrestler. He competed in the men's freestyle middleweight at the 1956 Summer Olympics.
