= Noel Granger =

Australian wrestler

Personal information
- Nationality: Australian
- Born: 1931
- Died: 11 June 2011 (aged 79–80)

Sport
- Sport: Wrestling

Noel Granger (1931 – 11 June 2011) was an Australian wrestler. He competed in the men's freestyle welterweight at the 1956 Summer Olympics.
