= Jay Clayton (wrestler) =

American professional wrestler (1941–2005)

Personal information
- Born: Jay Clayton Smith; 23 July 1941 Oklahoma City, Oklahoma, U.S.
- Died: 25 December 2005 (aged 64) Santa Fe, New Mexico

Professional wrestling career
- Ring name(s): Jay Clayton; Jay Clay
- Trained by: Danny Hodge
- Debut: 1974
- Retired: 1976

Jay Clayton Smith (July 23, 1941 – December 25, 2005) was an American professional wrestler, and US Marine who wrestled in NWA Tri-State in the mid-1970s.

== Early life ==
Smith worked for the United States Marine who fought in the Vietnam War from 1961 to 1964.

== Professional wrestling career ==
Trained by Danny Hodge, Smith would make his professional wrestling debut in 1974 in Florida. In 1975 he left Florida and worked in Georgia and NWA Tri-State.

He won the NWA Tri-State Tag Team Championship in 1975 both his trainer Danny Hodge and Ken Mantell.

He retired from wrestling in 1976 due to battling alcoholism and drug addiction.

== Personal life ==
In 1998, Smith graduated from Southern Nazarene University with a Masters of Science degree in Counseling Psychology. For the past 7 years, Jay worked as a Senior Therapist at The Life Healing Center of Santa Fe as a Trauma and Addictions Therapist.

== Death ==
Smith died on Christmas Day 2005 at 64 from blood clots in the brain at his home in Santa Fe, New Mexico.

== Championships and accomplishments ==
- NWA Tri-State
  - NWA United States Tag Team Championship (Tri-State version) (2 times) – with Danny Hodge (1) and Ken Mantell (1)
