= Vakhtang Balavadze (wrestler) =

Georgian wrestler (1927–2018)

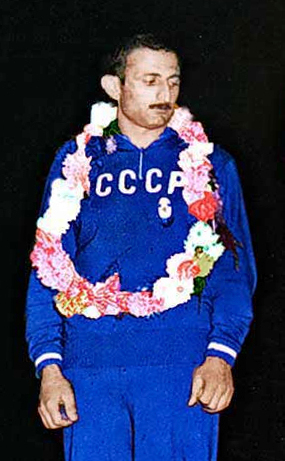
- Balavadze at the 1959 World Championships

Personal information
- Born: 20 November 1927 Ganiri, Georgian SSR, Soviet Union (now Samtredia, Georgia)
- Died: 25 July 2018 (aged 90)

Sport
- Sport: Freestyle wrestling
- Club: Burevestnik Tbilisi
Medal record
Representing the Soviet Union
Olympic Games
| Bronze medal – third place | 1956 Melbourne | 73 kg |
World Championships
| Gold medal – first place | 1954 Tokyo | 73 kg |
| Gold medal – first place | 1957 Istanbul | 73 kg |
| Silver medal – second place | 1959 Tehran | 73 kg |

Vakhtang Balavadze (Georgian pronunciation: [vaχtʼanɡ balavadze]; 20 November 1927 – 25 July 2018) was a Georgian welterweight freestyle wrestler. He competed at the 1956 and 1960 Summer Olympics and won a bronze medal in 1956. He won the world title in 1954 and 1957, and was a runner-up in 1959. Balavadze won the Soviet title in 1952–55 and 1957, placing second in 1956 and 1959. He retired from competition following the 1960 Summer Olympics to become a wrestling coach and referee.
