= Georgy Skhirtladze =

Georgian wrestler

Personal information
- Nationality: Georgian
- Born: 9 November 1932 Samegrelo-Zemo Svaneti, Georgian SSR, Soviet Union
- Died: 25 March 2008 (aged 75) Tbilisi, Georgia

Sport
- Sport: Wrestling
Medal record
Men's freestyle wrestling
Representing the Soviet Union
Olympic Games
Silver medal – second place	1960 Rome	Middleweight
Bronze medal – third place	1956 Melbourne	Middleweight
World Cup
Silver medal – second place	1958 Sofia	Middleweight

Georgi Skhirtladze (Georgian: გიორგი სხირტლაძე; 9 November 1932 – 25 March 2008) was a wrestler from Soviet Georgia. He was Olympic silver medalist in Freestyle wrestling in 1960 and bronze medalist in 1956, competing for the Soviet Union. He won a gold medal at the 1959 World Wrestling Championships.
