= Ivan Vykhristyuk =

Soviet wrestler

Personal information
- Full name: Ivan Andreyevich Vykhristyuk
- Nationality: Soviet
- Born: 29 January 1929

Sport
- Sport: Wrestling

Ivan Vykhristyuk (born 29 January 1929) was a Soviet wrestler. He competed in the men's freestyle heavyweight at the 1956 Summer Olympics.
