= Anatoly Parfyonov =

Soviet Greco-Roman wrestler (1925–1993)

Personal information
- Born: 17 November 1925 Dvornikovo, Moscow Oblast, Russian SFSR, Soviet Union
- Died: 28 January 1993 (aged 67) Moscow, Russia
- Height: 190 cm (6 ft 3 in)
- Weight: 120 kg (265 lb)

Sport
- Sport: Greco-Roman wrestling
- Club: Dynamo Moscow
- Coached by: Andrei Gordienko
Medal record
Men's Greco-Roman wrestling
Representing the Soviet Union
Olympic Games
Gold medal – first place	1956 Melbourne	+87 kg

Anatoly Ivanovich Parfyonov (Russian: Анатолий Иванович Парфëнов, 17 November 1925 – 28 January 1993) was a Soviet heavyweight Greco-Roman wrestler who won a gold medal at the 1956 Olympics.

== Biography ==
In his youth Parfyonov worked as a mechanic at a spinning and weaving factory. In 1942, during World War II, he enlisted to the Soviet Army, and fought as a machine gunner and later as a T-34 tank driver. In October 1943 he was wounded in the elbow and arm during the battle of the Dnieper, and after that could not fully bend the arm for the rest of his life. For his wartime service he was awarded the Order of Lenin and the Order of the Patriotic War. He was honorably discharged in 1946 and returned to his spinning factory.

Parfyonov took up wrestling in 1951, aged 26, and won the Soviet heavyweight title in 1954 and 1957, placing third in 1956 and 1959. He was never skilled in wrestling techniques, but was revered for his physical strength. After retiring from competitions Parfyonov had a long career as a wrestling coach and raised the 1976 Olympic champion Nikolay Balboshin. His son Vladimir also became a competitive wrestler. In the 1960s–70s Parfyonov had minor roles in Soviet films, such as a German security guard in Seventeen Moments of Spring. Since 1999 an international wrestling has been held in Moscow in his honor. The minor planet 7913 Parfyonov is named after him.
