= Rune Jansson =

Swedish Greco-Roman wrestler

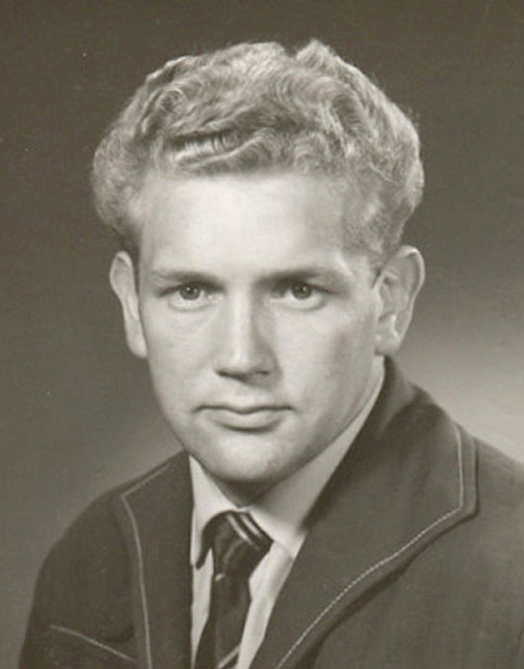

Personal information
- Born: 29 May 1932 Skinnskatteberg, Sweden
- Died: 24 November 2018 (aged 86)
- Height: 177 cm (5 ft 10 in)

Sport
- Sport: Greco-Roman wrestling
- Club: Örgryte IS; Uddevalla IS
Medal record
Representing Sweden
Olympic Games
Bronze medal – third place	1956 Melbourne	Middleweight
World Championships
Bronze medal – third place	1958 Budapest	87 kg

Rune Jansson (29 May 1932 – 24 November 2018) was a Swedish Greco-Roman wrestler. He competed at the 1956 and 1960 Olympics and won a bronze medal in 1956. He won another bronze at the 1958 World Championships, finishing fourth in 1955 and 1962.
