= Ernst Wandaller =

Austrian wrestler

Personal information
- Nationality: Austrian
- Born: 4 October 1934 (age 91)

Sport
- Sport: Wrestling

Ernst Wandaller (born 4 October 1934) is an Austrian wrestler. He competed in the men's Greco-Roman welterweight at the 1956 Summer Olympics.
