= Muhammad Latif =

Pakistani wrestler (born 1939)

Personal information
- Nationality: Pakistani
- Born: 13 February 1939 (age 87)

Sport
- Sport: Wrestling

Muhammad Latif (born 13 February 1939) is a Pakistani wrestler. He competed in the men's freestyle welterweight at the 1956 Summer Olympics.
