= Devi Singh (wrestler) =

Indian wrestler (born 1926)

Personal information
- Nationality: Indian
- Born: 1926

Sport
- Sport: Wrestling

Devi Singh (born 1926) is an Indian wrestler. He competed in the men's freestyle welterweight at the 1956 Summer Olympics.
