= Ray Mitchell (wrestler) =

Australian wrestler (1921–2001)

Personal information
- Nationality: Australian
- Born: 28 March 1921 Tallangatta, Victoria, Australia
- Died: 25 March 2001 (aged 79)

Sport
- Sport: Wrestling
Medal record
Wrestling
Representing Australia
British Empire Games
Bronze medal – third place	1958 Cardiff	Men's Heavyweight
Silver medal – second place	1962 Perth	Men's Heavyweight

Ray Mitchell (28 March 1921 – 25 March 2001) was an Australian wrestler. He competed at the 1956 Summer Olympics and the 1960 Summer Olympics.
