= Givi Kartozia =

Soviet wrestler

Personal information
- Born: 29 March 1929 Batumi, Georgian SSR, Soviet Union
- Died: 3 April 1998 (aged 69) Tbilisi, Georgia
- Height: 176 cm (5 ft 9 in)

Sport
- Sport: Greco-Roman wrestling
- Club: Iskra Tbilisi; Burevestnik Tbilisi
Medal record
Men's Greco-Roman wrestling
Representing the Soviet Union
Olympic Games
| Gold medal – first place | 1956 Melbourne | 79 kg |
| Bronze medal – third place | 1960 Rome | 87 kg |
World Championships
| Gold medal – first place | 1953 Naples | 79 kg |
| Gold medal – first place | 1955 Karlsruhe | 79 kg |
| Gold medal – first place | 1958 Budapest | 79 kg |
World Cup
| Gold medal – first place | 1956 Istanbul | 79 kg |

Givi Aleksandrovich Kartozia (Georgian: გივი კარტოზია; 29 March 1929 – 3 April 1998) was a Middleweight Greco-Roman wrestler from Georgia. He won an Olympic gold medal in 1956 and a world title in 1953, 1955 and 1958. Domestically he was the Soviet middleweight champion in 1952–55, and placed second in 1956 and third in 1950 and 1951. For the 1960 Olympics he moved up to the light-heavyweight class and won a bronze medal. He retired soon after the Olympics and since 1966 acted as an international wrestling referee. He died in 1998, aged 69, and starting from 2010 an annual international wrestling tournament has been held in Tbilisi in his honor.
