= Mithat Bayrak =

Turkish wrestler (1929–2014)

Medal record

Men's Greco-Roman Wrestling

Representing Turkey

Olympic Games
Gold medal – first place	1960 Rome, Italy	73 kg
Gold medal – first place	1956 Melbourne, Australia	73 kg

World Cup
Silver medal – second place	1956 Istanbul	73 kg

Mediterranean Games
Silver medal – second place	1959 Beirut	78 kg

Balkan Championships
Silver medal – second place	1959 Istanbul	73 kg

Tournaments
Gold medal – first place	1959 Savona	78 kg
Silver medal – second place	1959 Split	73 kg

Mithat Bayrak (3 March 1929 – 20 April 2014) was a Turkish sports wrestler and trainer, who won two consecutive gold medals in the Welterweight class of Men's Greco-Roman Wrestling at the 1956 Olympics and 1960 Olympics.

Born on 3 March 1929 in Adapazarı of Sakarya Province, he began 1948 the wrestling sport in Sakarya Güneş Spor club. Following his admission to the national team, he was trained by the renowned wrestlers Gazanfer Bilge, Mehmet Oktav, Hüseyin Erkmen and Celal Atik. Mithat Bayrak won the gold medal twice for Turkey at the Olympic Games.

He ceased his international career after the 1960 Olympics and emigrated to Germany, where he joined the wrestling sports club KSV Witten 07. There, he wrestled almost 20 years more and served later also as trainer.

After the end of his career, he ran a restaurant in Witten, Germany.

== Achievements ==
- 1955 Mediterranean Games in Barcelona, Spain – 4th (Greco-Roman Welterweight)
- 1956 Summer Olympics in Melbourne, Australia – gold (Greco-Roman Welterweight)
- 1958 World Wrestling Championships in Budapest, Hungary – 10th (Greco-Roman Middleweight)
- 1959 Wrestling Tournament in Savona, Italy – gold (Greco-Roman Middleweight)
- 1959, Wrestling Tournament in Split, Yugoslavia – silver (Greco-Roman Welterweight)
- 1959 Mediterranean Games in Beirut, Lebanon – silver (Greco-Roman Welterweight)
- 1959 Balkan Wrestling Championships in Istanbul, Turkey – silver (Greco-Roman Middleweight)
- 1960 Summer Olympics in Rome, Italy – gold (Greco-Roman Welterweight)
