= Hossein Nouri (wrestler, born 1931) =

Iranian wrestler

Personal information
- Nationality: Iranian
- Born: 1931
- Died: 1980 (aged 48–49)

Sport
- Sport: Wrestling

Hossein Nouri (Persian: حسین نوری, 1931 – 1980) was an Iranian wrestler. He competed in the men's freestyle heavyweight at the 1956 Summer Olympics.
