= Oddvar Vargset =

Norwegian wrestler

Personal information
- Nationality: Norwegian
- Born: 6 October 1925 Narvik, Norway
- Died: 23 November 1997 (aged 72) Ski, Norway

Sport
- Sport: Wrestling

Oddvar Vargset (6 October 1925 – 23 November 1997) was a Norwegian wrestler. He competed in the men's Greco-Roman welterweight at the 1956 Summer Olympics.
