= Bengt Lindblad =

Swedish wrestler

Personal information
- Nationality: Swedish
- Born: 26 August 1925; Vänersborg, Sweden
- Died: 6 March 1993 (aged 67); Trollhättan, Sweden

Sport
- Sport: Wrestling

Bengt Lindblad (26 August 1925 – 6 March 1993) was a Swedish wrestler. He competed at the 1952 Summer Olympics and the 1956 Summer Olympics.
