= Veikko Rantanen =

Finnish wrestler (1932–2014)

Personal information
- Nationality: Finnish
- Born: 5 January 1932 Sysmä, Finland
- Died: 28 January 2014 (aged 82) Heinola, Finland

Sport
- Sport: Wrestling
Medal record
Representing Finland
Greco-Roman wrestling
World Cup
Bronze medal – third place	1956 Istanbul	-73 kg

Veikko Rantanen (5 January 1932 – 28 January 2014) was a Finnish wrestler. He competed at the 1956 Summer Olympics and the 1960 Summer Olympics.
