= Coenraad de Villiers =

South African wrestler (1933–2008)

Personal information
- Nationality: South African
- Born: 28 March 1933; Caledon, Western Cape, South Africa
- Died: 2008 (aged 74–75)

Sport
- Sport: Wrestling

Coenraad Wessel de Villiers (28 March 1933 – 2008) was a South African wrestler. He competed at the 1956 Summer Olympics and the 1960 Summer Olympics. De Villiers died in 2008.
