= Dimitar Dobrev (academic) =

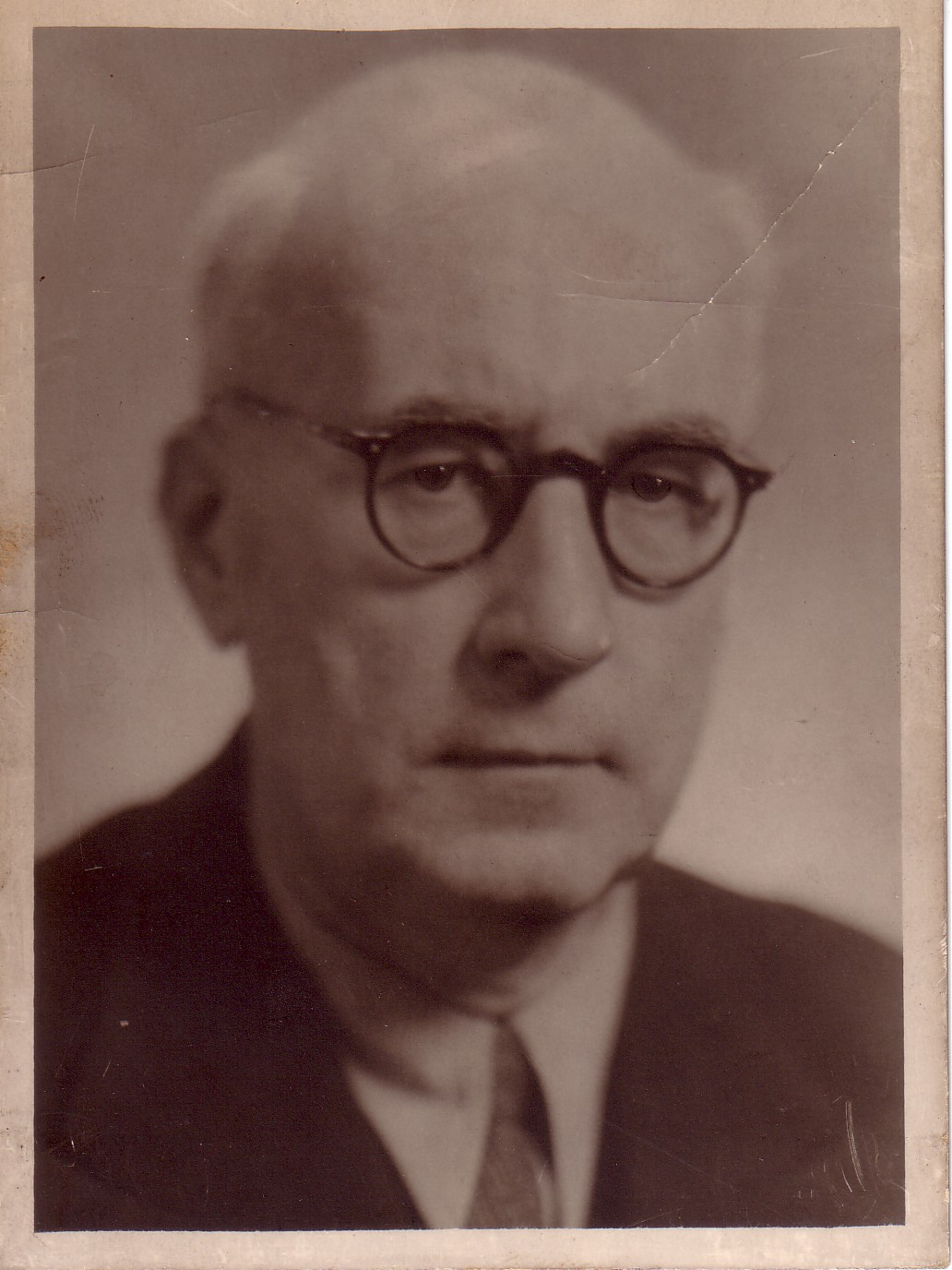
Prof. Dobrev's last portrait

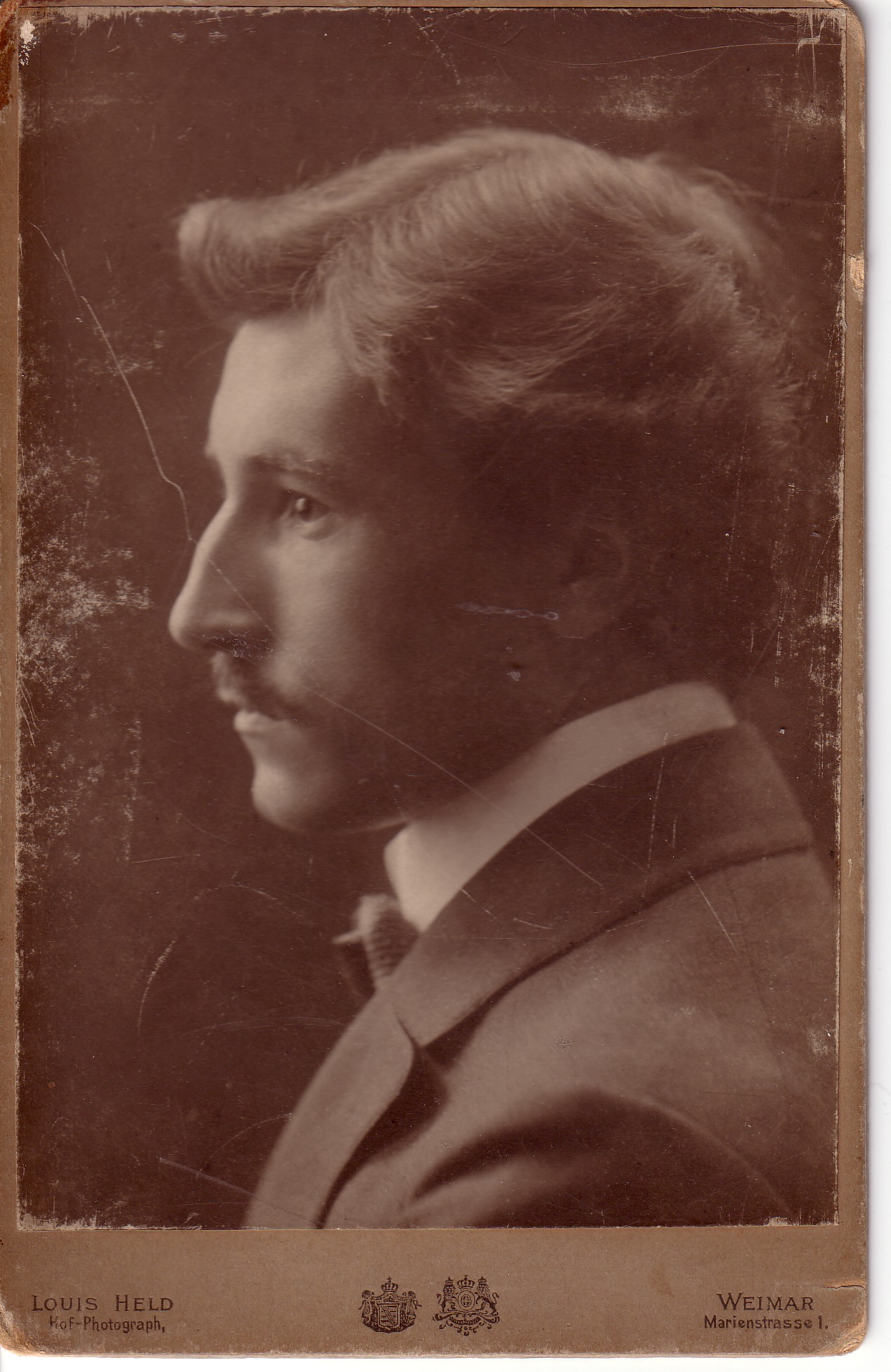
Dr. Dobrev in 1911

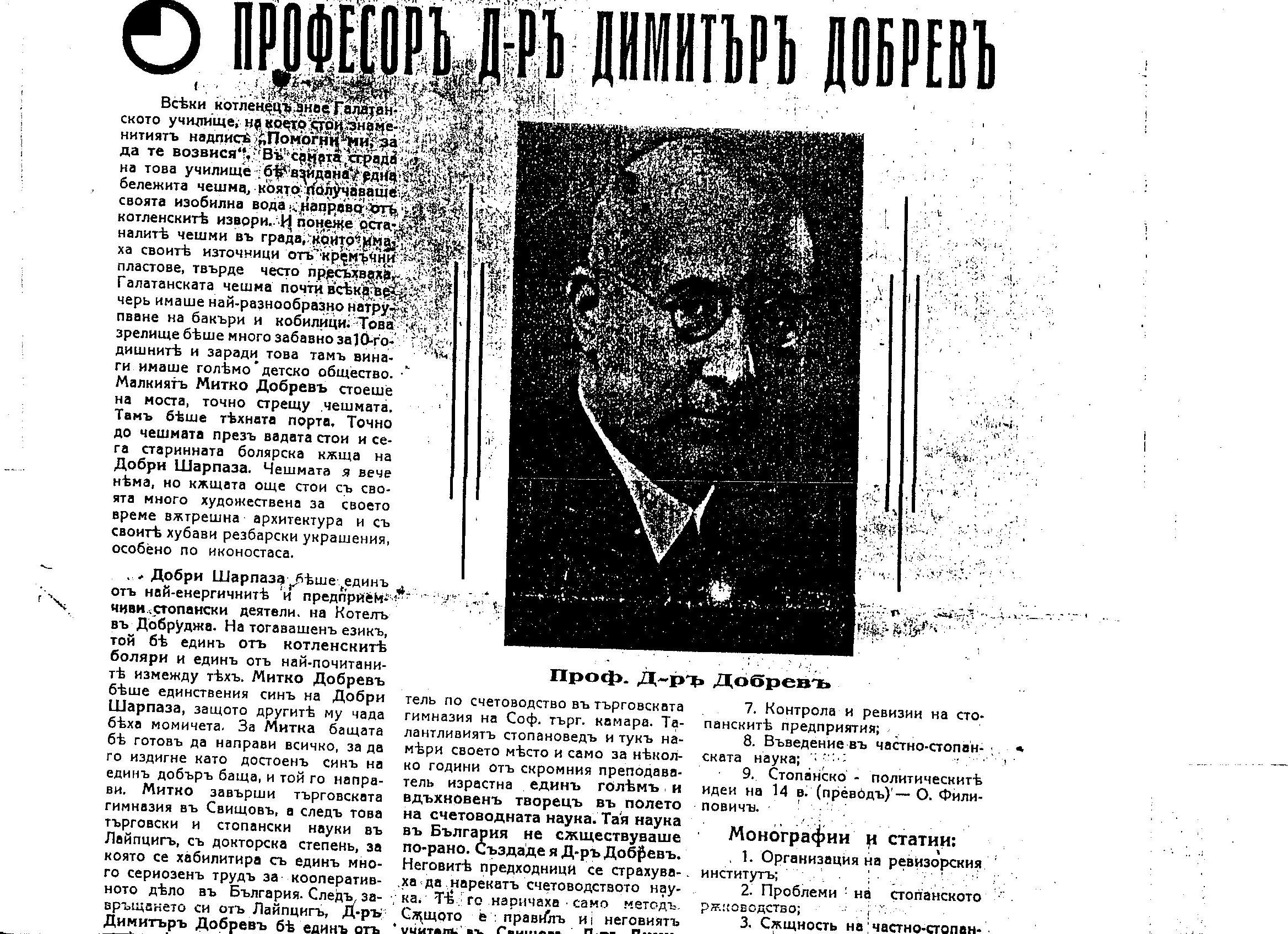
Kotel 1933

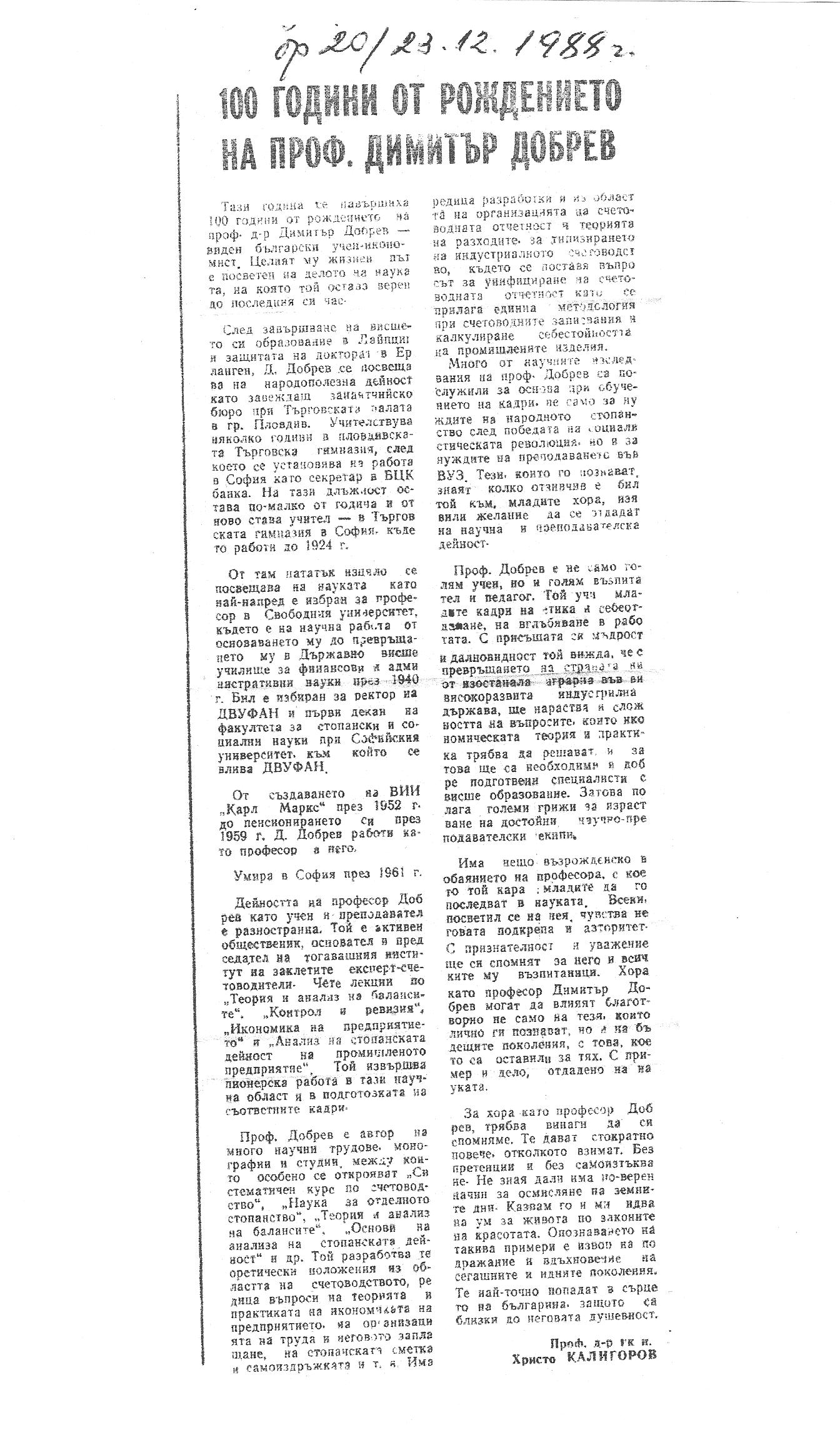
1988 Prof. Kaligorov article

Dimitar Dobrev (Bulgarian: Димитър Добрев) was one of Bulgaria’s leading economists and academicians. He worked in the field of accountancy as science, a theoretician, economist, lecturer, second Rector of the Free University of Political and Economic Sciences, professor at the State High School of Finance and administrative sciences (Bulgarian: Държавно Висше училище за финансови и административни науки ДВУФАН) and the Higher Economics Institute "Karl Marx".

== Brief biographical data ==
Dobrev was born on 31 August 1888 in Kotel, Bulgaria. He studied at the Trade and Commerce College Svishtov. He graduated, completing a doctorate degree in economics at Erlangen, Germany in 1911. On completion of his studies, he returned as an idealistic proponent of collectivistic econometric doctrines which at that time predominated the minds of Bulgarian intellectuals. He worked at Trade and Commerce Chambers, at the Bulgarian Central Cooperative Bank, then as a teacher in Plovdiv, and then in Sofia.

He taught as a regular professor from 1924 until 1940 at University of National and World Economy, then known as the Free University for political and economic sciences until its transformation as State Higher Education School of Finance and Administrative Sciences. In 1940 Professor Dobrev was appointed the second Rector until 1948. The State High School of Finance became a Faculty for economic and social sciences at Sofia University, which then restored its independent status in 1953 as the Higher Economics Institute "Karl Marx". Professor Dobrev continued as First Dean and Professor in the Faculty for economic and social sciences at the University of National and World Economy from 1948 until his retirement in 1959.

He is reputed to have been the personal accountant to King Boris III of Bulgaria prior to World War Two (source: Professor K.Pergelov). He had been a founder and director of the former Institute of Chartered Accountants (Bulgarian: Институт на заклетите експерт-счетоводители). He was awarded the medal of St. Cyril and Metodius, First Degree. After a 40-year career in academia and teaching, Dobrev died in Sofia on 21 April 1961.

== Contributions to Bulgarian economic sciences ==
Prof. Dobrev is mentioned by his former students (see Professor Christo Kaligorov) as ″not merely a great scientist, but an outstanding educator and a pedagogue″.

Professor Kosta Pergelov spoke of his ″contribution as the founder of contemporary accountancy theory in Bulgaria, who is rightly regarded by the generations as the patriarch of accountancy in Bulgaria″.

In his academic work, „Strategic accountancy analysis of value-revolutionary stage in the development of accountancy science“ Volume I, 2004, p. 33, Docent Trifon Trifonov, cites that “according to D. Dobrev, “...categories of monetary values... separately do not accomplish evaluated movements (economic turnover), except for their being placed in one unified functional entirety... as it is necessary for these forces to be drawn from their concrete material characteristic over one common denominator of the monetary-valuation enumeration” (as cited in Dobrev, D., Science of the separate economy, Printing House H.G.Danov, O.O.Society, Sofia, 1941, p. 108)”.

Furthermore Docent Trifon Trifonov cites a colleague, (Yanakiev, R. 1971) who stated, “that when he makes a general historical review of evolution in world theory on business management relative to development in our country during the period 1900-1944, the author (Yanakiev) especially emphasizes the role of the founder of the Bulgarian Accountancy Science Professor D.Dobrev in the development of this theory.”

R.Yanakiev stresses the contribution of the great Bulgarian economist in developing the ″financial-economic questions″ in management, ″although reference here is to an entire financial-accounting school for his successors, created by the notable scientist, quite undeservedly forgotten during Bulgaria's totalitarian government." The work ″Science of the separate economy″ (1941) of Professor Dobrev is marked also in the neoclassical interpretation of capitalist enterprise even by the pre-war Bulgarian political economists.″

Demostenov, S., “Theoretical political economy” part 1, Sofia, 1991, p. 343 (Bulgarian: Демостенов, С., Теоретическа политическа икономия, част 1, УИ, С., 1991, с.343) writes that “our review (neoclassical) of the separate economies,...should not be seen as „Study of the separate economy“, in our literature to this study there is already dedicated a specialist book by Professor D.Dobrev”

Professor D. Dobrev knew only too well the neoclassical economics (marginalised school) and its European proponents, widely cited in his study of the separate economy. Approaching historically towards understanding of the separate enterprise, the author gives a systematic review of it as an ″instrumental unit, a constructive social element of organised human purposeful activities, at the base of which lies budget activity″

== Main theoretical works ==
- “Theory and analysis of balances” Sofia (3 editions to 1946); Наука за балансите
- “Science of the separate economy” Sofia (2 editions 1941, 1946); Наука за отделното стопанство
- “Systematic Course in Accountancy” Sofia (6 editions 1928-1946); Систематичен курс по счетоводство
- “Manual for control, revisions and expertise in state enterprises” Sofia (1933); Контрола и ревизия на стопанските предприятия
- “Economics of company enterprises” (1949); Икономика на предприятието
- “Basic analysis of economic activity of industrial enterprises”(2 editions 1954-1957); Основи на анализа на стопанската дейност на промишленото предприятие
- “Systematic accountancy in Trade and Industry” Plovdiv (1914); Систематичен курс по търговство и индустрия
- “Structural problems of the automated agricultural industry” (1945); Структурни проблеми на технизираното стопанство
- “Chartered Accountancy in Industry” (1924 and 1935); Индустриално счетоводство

== Monographies and articles ==
- “Organisation of the audit institute”
- “Problems of the economic management”
- “Essence of private ownership in economic science”
- “Economic essence of cooperatives”
- “Contribution to the theory of accountancy”
- “Accountancy in its origins and scientific foundation”
- “Crisis in the economy and economic rationalization”
- “Auctioneering private enterprises and national savings”
- “Formation of cost evaluations”
- “Influence of evaluation norms on capital and reliability of public enterprises”
- “Economic reflections of the hidden reserves”
- “Rationalization and unemployment”
- “New direction in industrial politics in Russia”
- “Accountancy and valuation treatment of risk investments”
- “Guiding and completing function of state economic enterprises”
- “On the question of obligatory keeping of trade book-keeping”
- “Expenditures of private enterprise and their calculative effect on prices”
- “Private-economics sciences in the Free University”
