= Nikola Stanchev =

Bulgarian wrestler (1930–2009)

Medal record

Men's freestyle wrestling

Representing Bulgaria

Olympic Games
Gold medal – first place	1956 Melbourne	Middleweight

Nikola Nikolov Stanchev (Bulgarian: Никола Станчев Николов, 11 September 1930 – 12 July 2009) was a Bulgarian freestyle wrestler.

He was born in Tvarditsa, Burgas province.

The club he belonged to was Chernomoretz Burgas.

He was the 1956 Olympic Games middle weight freestyle wrestling champion - the first Bulgarian Olympics gold medal - and silver medal winner at the World championship in Istanbul the same year.
