= Husein Mehmedov =

Bulgarian wrestler (1924–2014)

Personal information
- Nationality: Turkish And Bulgarian
- Born: 25 January 1924 Razgrad, Bulgaria
- Died: 9 March 2014 (aged 90) Istanbul, Turkey
- Occupation: Olympic wrestler
Medal record
Representing Bulgaria
Men's freestyle wrestling
Olympic Games
Silver medal – second place	1956 Melbourne	Heavyweight
World Championships
Bronze medal – third place	1957 Istanbul	Heavyweight
World Cup
Bronze medal – third place	1956 Istanbul	Heavyweight
Summer Universiade
Gold medal – first place	1957 Moscow	Heavyweight
Men's Greco-Roman wrestling
World Cup
Bronze medal – third place	1956 Istanbul	Heavyweight
Summer Universiade
Gold medal – first place	1955 Warsaw	Heavyweight
Bronze medal – third place	1957 Moscow	Heavyweight

Husein Mehmedov (Bulgarian: Хюсеин Мехмедов) (25 January 1924 – 9 March 2014) was a Bulgarian wrestler of Turkish descent who competed in the 1956 Summer Olympics.

Husein Mekhmedov was of the Turkish minority in Bulgaria and was introduced to wrestling at a young age. Mehmedov competed at heavyweight his entire career and was equally strong at both styles of wrestling. He was selected for the Bulgarian national team in 1950 after his military service with the Bulgarian Army.

Mehmedov had a brief but successful international career. He first competed internationally at the 1955 World Student Games, winning gold in Greco-Roman heavyweight. In 1956, he won bronze in both Greco-Roman and freestyle at the World Cup and established himself as one of the medal contenders in both heavyweight styles at the 1956 Melbourne Olympics. At Melbourne, Mekhmedov won silver in freestyle, but had to withdraw from the Greco-Roman event days later after two bouts due to injury. In 1957, he won gold in freestyle and silver in Greco-Roman heavyweight at the World Student Games and later won bronze at the 1957 World Freestyle Wrestling Championships.

Mehmedov finished his competitive career in 1959. He then worked as a wrestling coach in Bulgaria until 1989, when he emigrated to Turkey. He settled in Istanbul, where he died in March 2014 at the age of 90.

Hussein Mehmedov was the father of Resmiye Şengüler, and the grandfather of Mehnur Çakır, Hatice Şengüler, Hüseyin Çakır, and Ata Nuh.
