= Bruno Ochman =

Canadian wrestler

Personal information
- Born: 7 September 1929 Sault Ste. Marie, Ontario, Canada
- Died: 3 November 1990 (aged 61) Sault Sainte Marie, Ontario, Canada

Sport
- Sport: Wrestling

Bruno Ochman (7 September 1929 – 3 November 1990) was a Canadian wrestler. He competed in the men's freestyle welterweight at the 1956 Summer Olympics.
