= Hans Sterr =

German wrestler

Personal information
- Nationality: German
- Born: 8 June 1933 Munich, Germany
- Died: 18 May 2011 (aged 77) Stahnsdorf, Germany

Sport
- Sport: Wrestling

Hans Sterr (8 June 1933 – 18 May 2011) was a German wrestler. He competed in the men's Greco-Roman middleweight at the 1956 Summer Olympics.
