= Kazuo Katsuramoto =

Japanese wrestler (born 1934)

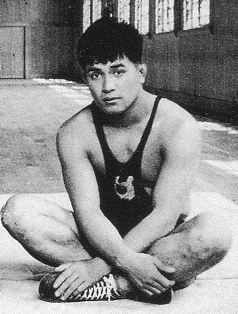

Personal information
- Born: September 5, 1934 (age 92) Mashike, Hokkaido, Japan

Sport
- Sport: Freestyle wrestling
Medal record
Representing Japan
World Wrestling Championships
Bronze medal – third place	1954 Tokyo	-79 kg
Asian Games
Gold medal – first place	1954 Manila	-79 kg

Kazuo Katsuramoto (born September 5, 1934) is a retired Japanese freestyle wrestler. In 1954 he won the −79 kg event at the Asian Games and finished third at the world championships. He shared fifth place at the 1956 Summer Olympics.
