= Taisto Kangasniemi =

Finnish wrestler (1924–1997)

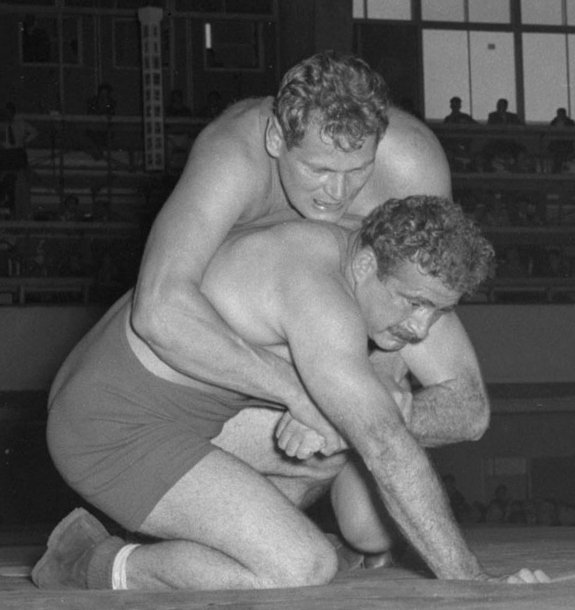
- Kangasniemi (top) at the 1952 Olympics

Personal information
- Born: 2 April 1924 Kankaanpää, Finland
- Died: 31 October 1997 (aged 73) Kangasala, Finland
- Height: 186 cm (6 ft 1 in)
- Weight: 100–110 kg (220–243 lb)

Sport
- Sport: Wrestling
- Club: Kankaanpään Meno; Tampereen Painiseura; TUL
Medal record
Men's freestyle wrestling
Representing Finland
Olympic Games
Bronze medal – third place	1956 Melbourne	+87 kg

Taisto Ilmari Kangasniemi (2 April 1924 – 31 October 1997) was a Finnish heavyweight wrestler. He competed in Greco-Roman and freestyle events at the 1948, 1952, 1956 and 1964 Summer Olympics, and won a freestyle bronze medal in 1956; he placed sixth in the freestyle in 1952 and fourth-sixth in Greco-Roman contests in 1952 and 1956. His best result at the world championships was fourth place in 1953 in Greco-Roman wrestling. Domestically he won eight Greco-Roman (1950–51, 1953, 1955, and 1962–63) and two freestyle titles (1953–54).

After retiring from competitions Kangasniemi worked as a sports instructor and functionary. He was president and then honorary president of Tampereen Painiseura, a wrestling club he co-founded.
