= Mitko Petkov =

Bulgarian wrestler

Personal information
- Full name: Mitko Gospodinov Petkov
- Nationality: Bulgarian
- Born: 12 June 1926

Sport
- Sport: Wrestling

Mitko Petkov (born 12 June 1926) was a Bulgarian wrestler. He competed in two events at the 1956 Summer Olympics.
