= Dimitar Dobrev (wrestler) =

Bulgarian Greco-Roman wrestler (1931–2019)

Medal record

Men's Greco-Roman wrestling

Representing Bulgaria

Olympic Games
Gold medal – first place	1960 Rome	Middleweight
Silver medal – second place	1956 Melbourne	Middleweight

Dimitar Dimitrov Dobrev (Bulgarian: Димитър Добрев; 14 April 1931 – 1 April 2019) was a Greco-Roman wrestler from Bulgaria, where he spent most of his professional career. Dobrev was the Olympic champion in the middleweight division of Greco-Roman wrestling at the 1960 Summer Olympics.

Born in Ezerche, Dobrev was a mathematician, and, prior to his competitive wrestling career, he was a gymnast.

== See also ==
- Evelin Banev "Brendo"
