= Viljo Punkari =

Finnish wrestler

Personal information
- Nationality: Finnish
- Born: 3 October 1934; Ylistaro, Finland
- Died: 15 November 1964 (aged 30); Ylistaro, Finland

Sport
- Sport: Wrestling

Viljo Punkari (3 October 1934 – 15 November 1964) was a Finnish wrestler. He competed at the 1956 Summer Olympics and the 1960 Summer Olympics.
