= Aras Valley campaign =

Campaign in the Second Nagorno-Karabakh War

- Part of the Second Nagorno-Karabakh War
- Map of the campaign as of 29 October 2020 (For a more detailed map, see military situation in the Second Nagorno-Karabakh War)
Date	First phase: 27 September 2020 – 22 October 2020 (3 weeks and 4 days); Second phase: 22 October 2020 – 10 November 2020 (2 weeks and 5 days)
Location	Armenian-occupied territories surrounding Nagorno-Karabakh, Azerbaijan–Iran border
Status	Azerbaijani victory
Territorial changes	Azerbaijani forces take control of large chunks of Fuzuli, Jabrayil, and Zangilan districts, and full control of the Azerbaijan–Iran border

Belligerents
Azerbaijan	Artsakh; Armenia

Commanders and leaders
Mais Barkhudarov; Elchin Guliyev; Ilham Mehdiyev; Shukur Hamidov; Hikmat Mirzayev	Ararat Melkumyan; David Grigoryan; Yuri Alaverdyan

Units involved
Azerbaijani Armed Forces; Azerbaijani Land Forces; 2nd Corps; Special Forces; Azerbaijani Navy; Marine Infantry Battalion; Azerbaijani Air Forces; State Border Service	Artsakh Defence Army; Armed Forces of Armenia; National Security Service

Strength
Unknown regular military Units: Unknown number of Bayraktar TB2; Unknown number of IAI Harop; Unknown number of Orbiter 1K	Unknown regular military

Casualties and losses
Per Azerbaijan: Unspecified; Per Armenia: Unspecified	Per Armenia: Unspecified; Per Azerbaijan: At least 40 servicemen killed; Units: 7+ tanks destroyed; 6+ other vehicles destroyed; 4+ BM-21 Grad destroyed; 1+ D-30 howitzer destroyed; 3+ Tor-M2KM destroyed; 2+ UAVs downed; 2 Su-25s downed; Many tanks and IFVs captured
- 1 Azerbaijani civilian killed 6 Azerbaijani civilian injured

The Aras Valley campaign (Note: In Armenia, it has been occasionally called the Southern front.; In Azerbaijan, it has been referred to as Operations along the Aras (Azerbaijani: Arazboyu əməliyyatlar).) (Azerbaijani: Araz vadisi əməliyyatları, Armenian: Արասի հովտի արշավ, romanized: Arasi hovti arshav) was a military operation launched by Azerbaijan against the breakaway Republic of Artsakh along the Aras River in the Azerbaijan–Iran border during the Second Nagorno-Karabakh War.

The operations started on 27 September, with Azerbaijani advancements in Jabrayil and Fuzuli districts, with the initial objective to seize control of Jabrayil and Füzuli. On 9 October, both sides agreed to a temporary humanitarian ceasefire. After the declared ceasefire, the President of Artsakh admitted Azerbaijan had been able to achieve some success, moving the front deep into Artsakh territory; the Armenian Prime Minister announced that Armenian forces had conducted a "partial retreat".

However, the ceasefire quickly broke down and the Azerbaijani advance continued. Within days Azerbaijan announced the capture of dozens of villages. The Azerbaijani forces, advancing more along the Aras River, captured the Khodaafarin Bridges and the nearby dam. On 20 October, the Azerbaijani forces took control of Zangilan, and on 22 October, Ağbənd, thus taking full control over the Azerbaijan–Iran border.

== Background ==
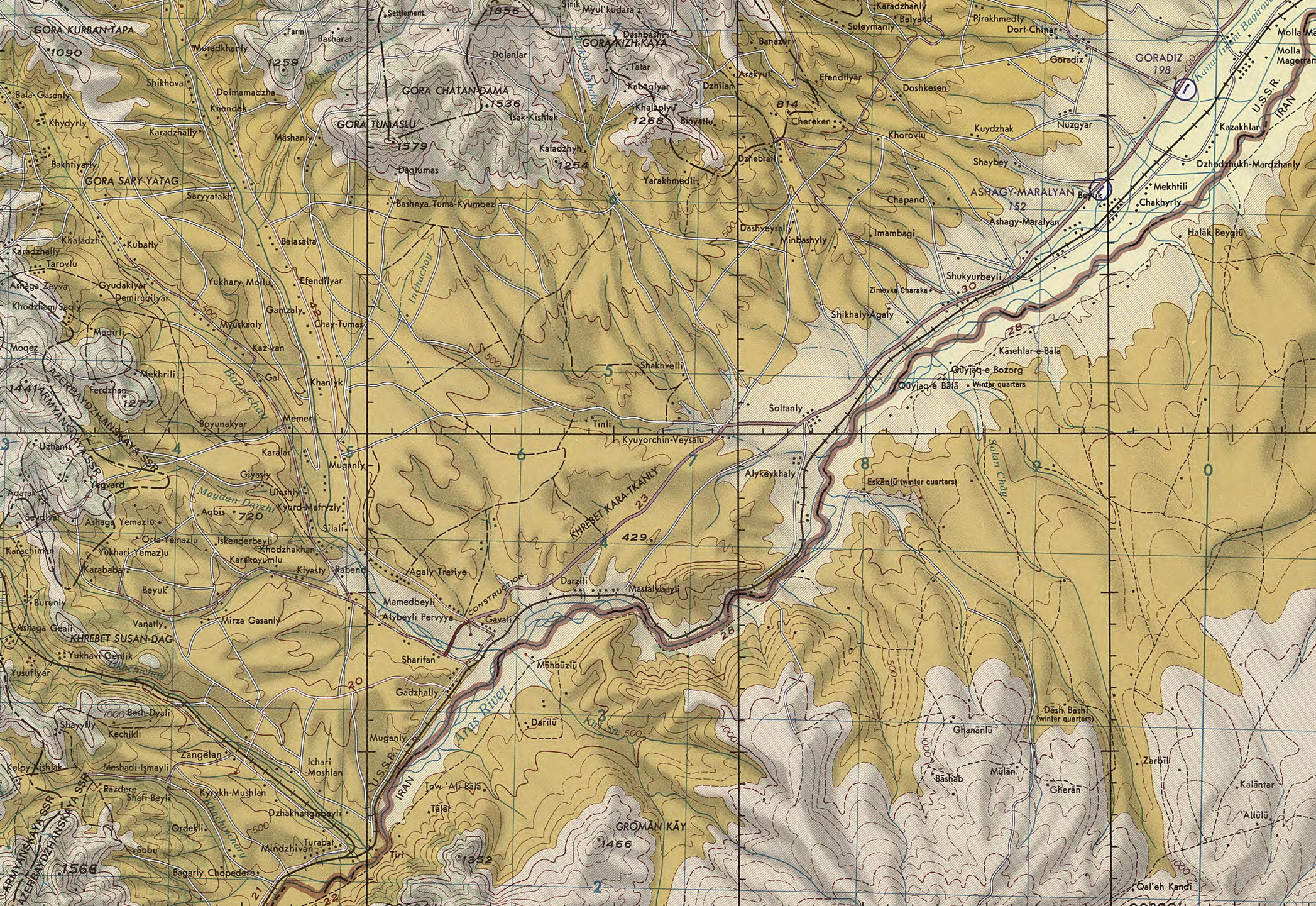
The territories along the Aras River have a less mountainous terrain in contrast to the Nagorno-Karabakh's northern and central territories

The disputed region of Nagorno-Karabakh, with its ethnic Armenian majority, was a de jure part of Azerbaijan, but was de facto held almost entirely by the self-proclaimed Republic of Artsakh which is supported by Armenia. On 20 February 1988, the Soviet of the Nagorno-Karabakh Autonomous Oblast passed a resolution requesting transfer of the oblast from the Azerbaijan SSR to the Armenia SSR; Azerbaijan rejected the request several times. Following the revoking of Nagorno-Karabakh's autonomous status, a referendum was held on 10 December 1991 in the region; it was boycotted by the Azerbaijani population which then constituted around 22.8%: 99.8% voted in favor. Both Armenia and Azerbaijan then became fully independent of the Soviet Union in 1991.

The First Nagorno-Karabakh War resulted in the displacement of 750,000 Azerbaijanis overall, with roughly 600,000 of them being from Nagorno-Karabakh and the seven surrounding districts, which were majority-Azeri, essentially cleansing all of the occupied territories from its Azerbaijani inhabitants. Similarly, 353,000 Armenians had to flee from Azerbaijan. The war ended with a ceasefire in 1994, with the Republic of Artsakh controlling most of the Nagorno-Karabakh region, as well as the surrounding districts of Agdam, Jabrayil, Fuzuli, Kalbajar, Qubadli, Lachin and Zangilan of Azerbaijan.

For three decades, multiple violations of the ceasefire had occurred, the most serious incidents prior to the Second Nagorno-Karabakh War being a four-day escalation in 2016. Long-standing international mediation attempts to create a peace process were initiated by the OSCE Minsk Group in 1994, with the interrupted Madrid Principles being the most recent iteration. While it is unclear how the present inhabitants of the area want to administer the territory, surveys indicate that they do not want to be part of Azerbaijan. In August 2019, in an unprecedented declaration in favour of unification, the Armenian Prime Minister, Nikol Pashinyan, visited Nagorno-Karabakh, stating, "Artsakh is Armenia, full stop".

Skirmishes occurred on the border between Armenia and Azerbaijan in July 2020. Thousands of Azerbaijanis demonstrated for war against Armenia in response, with Turkey propagandising in support of Azerbaijan.

== The campaign ==
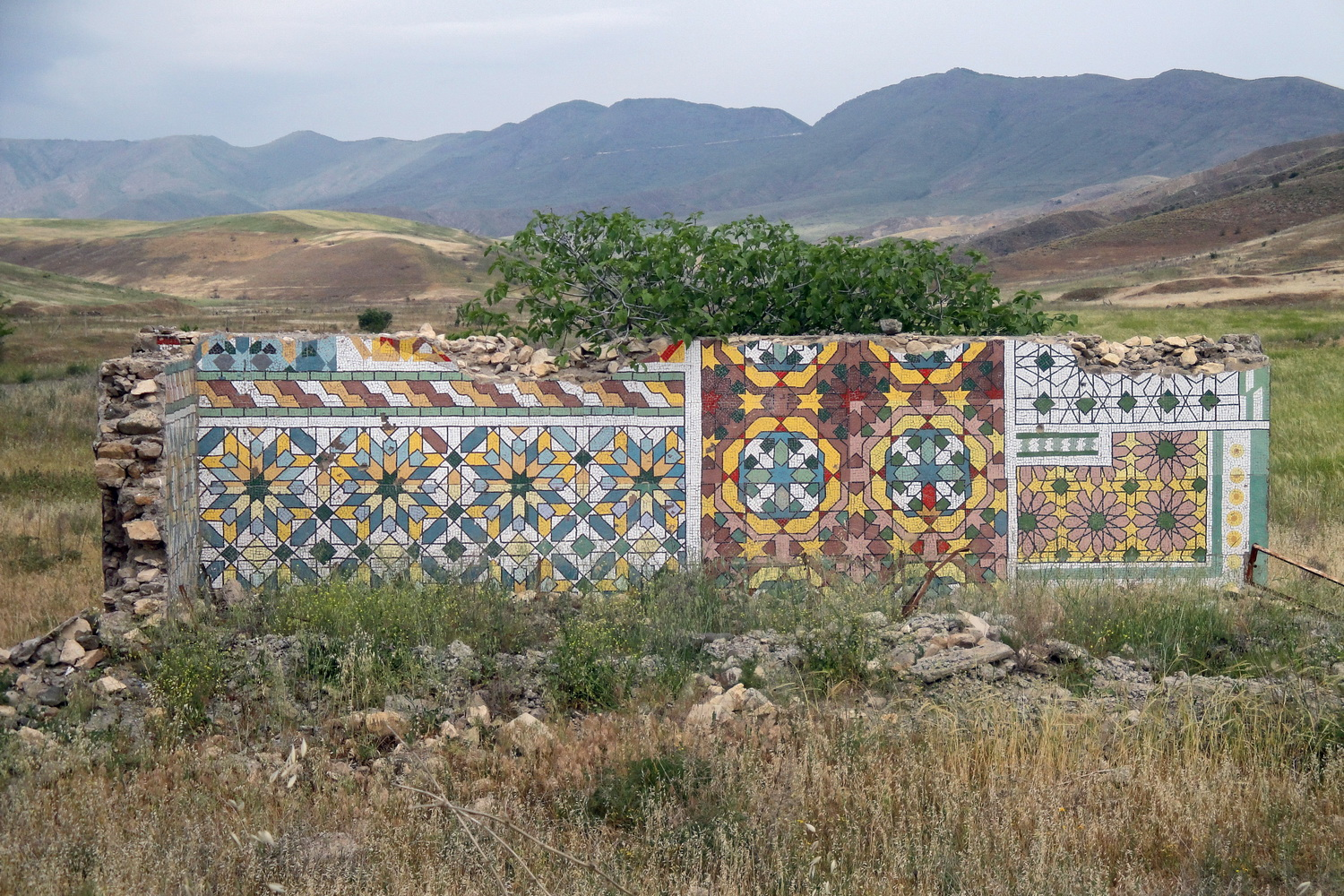
A destroyed bus stop in Jabrayil, 2014. The Azerbaijani president stated that Azerbaijan had taken control of the city on 4 October.

On 27 September the Azerbaijani MoD stated it had taken Qaraxanbəyli, Qərvənd, Kənd Horadiz and Yuxarı Əbdürrəhmanlı in Fuzuli, Böyük Mərcanlı and Nüzgər in Jabrayil. Next day, the Armenian MoD stated that the Azerbaijani forces had launched a new major offensive operation in the Aras Valley. The following day, the Azerbaijani MoD then stated that its offensive on Fuzuli City continued from the early morning. On 30 September, the Azerbaijani MoD stated that Azerbaijani forces had shelled the 4th Armenian Battalion, stationed in Fuzuli District. Next day, the Azerbaijani MoD stated that Jabrayil and Fuzuli Districts were being rocketed from Goris, in Armenia.

On 3 October, tense clashes took place along the Aras Valley. In the evening, President of Azerbaijan, Ilham Aliyev, stated that the Azerbaijani forces had taken control of Mehdili, Çaxırlı, Aşağı Maralyan, Şəybəy and Quycaq in Jabrayil, and Aşağı Əbdürrəhmanlı in Fuzuli. The following day, the Azerbaijani MoD stated that Armenian forces were shelling Fuzuli District. In the evening, Azerbaijani President Aliyev stated that the Azerbaijani forces had taken control of the city of Jabrayil, as well as Karxulu, Şükürbəyli, Çərəkən, Daşgəsən, Horovlu, Mahmudlu, Cəfərabad, Yuxarı Maralyan, and Decal in Jabrayil District. On 5 and 6 October, the Azerbaijani forces launched another offensive in the Jabrayil District. On 7 October, the Azerbaijani MoD stated that the Azerbaijani forces were in control of Jabrayil District. It also released footage apparently showing Azerbaijani forces in Şükürbəyli. Then, the Azerbaijani MoD stated that Armenian forces were shelling villages in Fuzuli and Jabrayil Districts, also that the Armenian forces were firing upon villages in Fuzuli District.

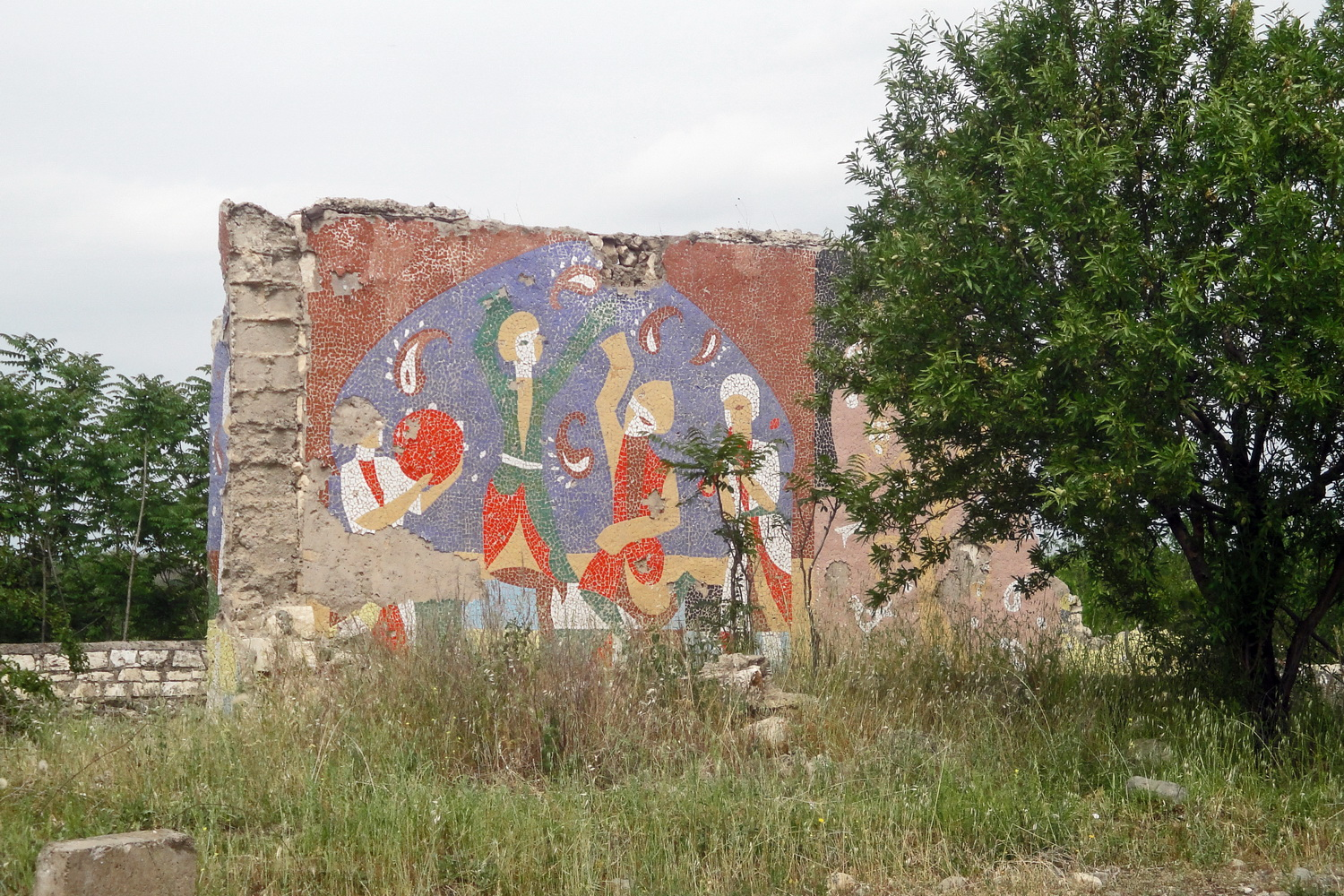
Ruins of Fuzuli in 2014. On 17 October, Azerbaijani President Ilham Aliyev stated that Azerbaijani forces had taken control of the city.

Just before 04:00 (00:00 GMT) on October 10, Russia reported that both Armenia and Azerbaijan had agreed on a humanitarian ceasefire after 10 hours of talks in Moscow (the Moscow Statement) and announced that both would enter "substantive" talks. Hostilities were formally halted at 12:00 (08:00 GMT), to allow an exchange of prisoners and the recovery of the dead, facilitated by the International Committee of the Red Cross (ICRC). But violations of the ceasefire were persistent, leading to the ICRC halting attempts to recover the dead and exchange wounded and prisoners, as well as prompting fears of a humanitarian crisis.

Armenia and Azerbaijan accused each other of bombarding civilian settlements prior to the ceasefire, with both sides denying the other's accusations. Each side also accused the other of breaking the ceasefire. Clashes broke out soon afterward, with Azerbaijan moving deeper into the conflict zone. The Azerbaijani president stated that Azerbaijani forces had retaliated for the ballistic missile attacks on Ganja by seizing control of Fuzuli and nearby villages but also called for immediate international intervention.

On 14 October Azerbaijan claimed control over Qaradağlı, Xatınbulaq, and Qarakollu in Fuzuli District. The next day, the Azerbaijan MOD stated its forces had seized control of Arış in Fuzuli District. Two days later, the Azerbaijani MOD claimed to have downed an Armenian SU-25, and to have retaken Füzuli and several villages. Armenia denied losing a warplane. On 18 October, the Azerbaijani MoD claimed to have downed an Armenian Su-25 warplane, which it stated had been attacking towards Jabrayil; Armenia issued a denial. At approximately 19:00, Azerbaijani forces released a footage from Fuzuli. The Azerbaijani president stated that the Azerbaijani forces had captured the Khodaafarin Bridges and Dam.

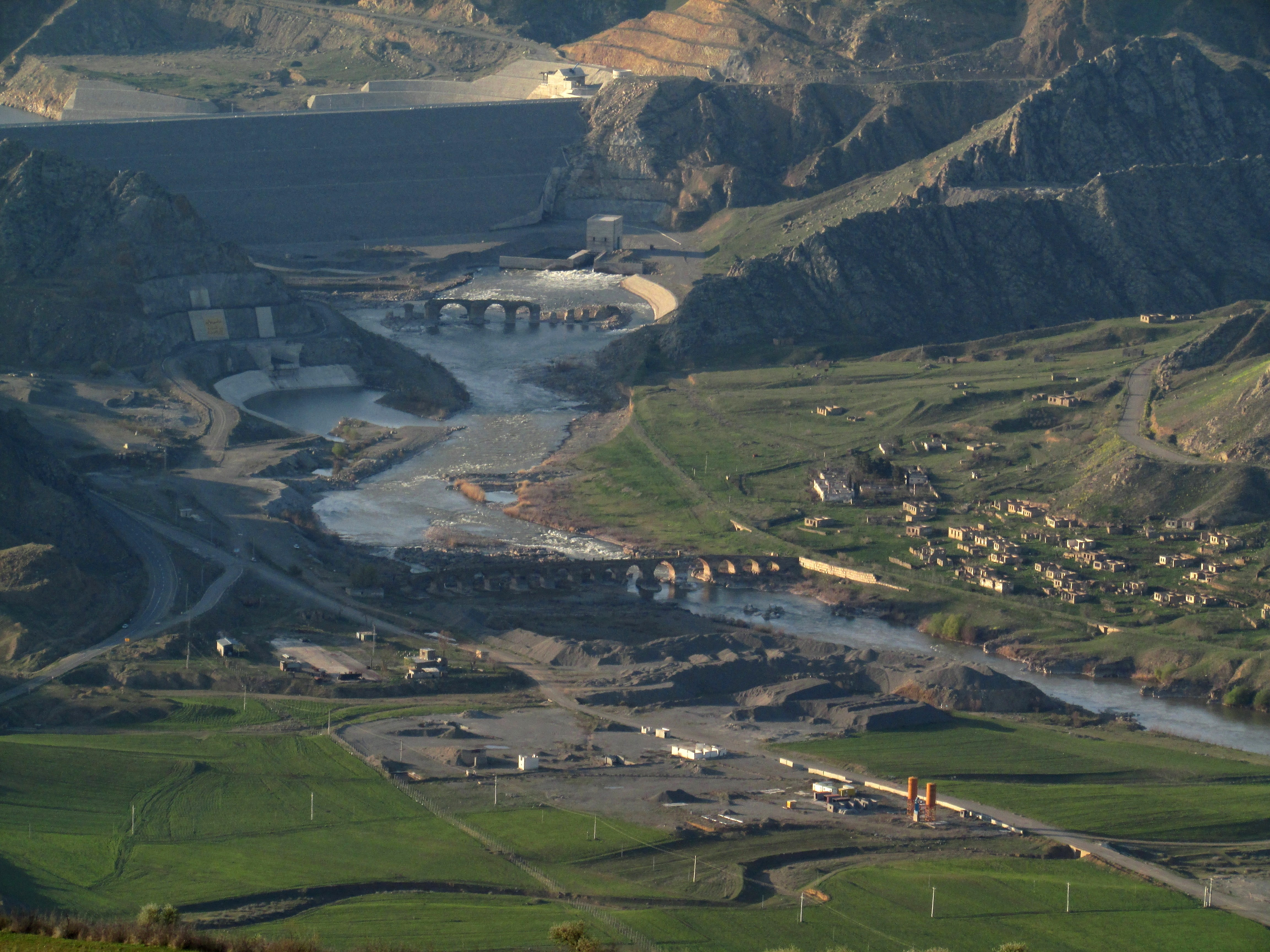
On 18 October, Azerbaijani forces took control of Khodaafarin Bridges and the dam nearby.

On 20 October, clashes intensified near Zəngilan, involving Azerbaijani offensives. The Azerbaijani President stated that Azerbaijani forces had claimed Zəngilan, the administrative center of Zangilan District, and Havalı, Zərnəli, Məmmədbəyli, Həkəri, Şarifan, and Muğanlı in Zangilan District. Soon after, the Azerbaijani MoD formally released footage showing Zəngilan, and "BBC Russian Service" confirmed Azerbaijan's statements. In turn, the Armenian MoD stated that Azerbaijani forces were retreating along the Aras River; Azerbaijan issued a denial. The next day, clashes further intensified, specifically in Zangilan. The President of Azerbaijan, Ilham Aliyev stated that the Azerbaijani forces had seized control of Mincivan town and villages of Gecəgözlü, Aşağı Seyidəhmədli, and Zərgər in Fuzuli, Bələnd, Papı, Tulus, Hacılı, and Tinli in Jabrayil, and Xurama, Xumarlı, Sarıl, Babaylı, Üçüncü Ağalı, Hacallı, Qıraq Müşlan, Üdgün, Turabad, İçəri Müşlan, Məlikli, Cahangirbəyli, and Baharlı in Zangilan districts.

On 22 October, clashes continued in Zəngilan. At approximately 17:30, the President of Azerbaijan stated that the Azerbaijani forces had seized control of Mollavəli, Yuxarı Rəfədinli, and Aşağı Rəfədinli in Fuzuli, and Sirik, Şıxlar, Məstalıbəyli, and Dərzili in Jabrayil districts. In addition, he stated that Azerbaijani forces had claimed Kolluqışlaq, Malatkeşin, Kənd Zəngilan, Genlik, Vəliqulubəyli, Qaradərə, Çöpədərə, Tatar, Tiri, Əmirxanlı, Qarqulu, Bartaz, Dəlləkli, and Ağbənd in Zangilan District, releasing confirmary footage. According to Aliyev, with this, Azerbaijani forces had secured control over the Azerbaijan–Iran border. Armenia issued a denial and stated that heavy clashes took place near Qacar in Fuzuli. The following day, clashes continued in Zəngilan. In the evening, the Azerbaijani president stated that Azerbaijani forces had claimed Dağ Tumas, Nüsüs, Xələfli, Minbaşılı, and Veysəlli in Jabrayil, Vənədli and Mirzəhəsənli in Zangilan District. The Azerbaijani MoD also released confirmary footage from one the villages claimed. The next day, the Azerbaijani MoD stated that the Armenian forces attempted to attack the Azerbaijani positions in Zangilan from Syunik Province of Armenia. On 25 October, the Azerbaijani MoD released footage from Zangilan and Jabrayil districts, in the very southwest of the theater of operations, near the Aras River and the Iranian border. The following day, the President of Azerbaijan, Ilham Aliyev, stated that the Azerbaijani forces had seized control of Qovşudlu, Sofulu, Dağ Maşanlı, Kürdlər, Hovuslu, and Çələbilər in Jabrayil District, Birinci Alıbəyli, İkinci Alıbəyli, Rəbənd, and Yenikənd in Zangilan District, along the Hakari Valley. The Armenian authorities confirmed that the Azerbaijani forces had launched an offensive in the region.

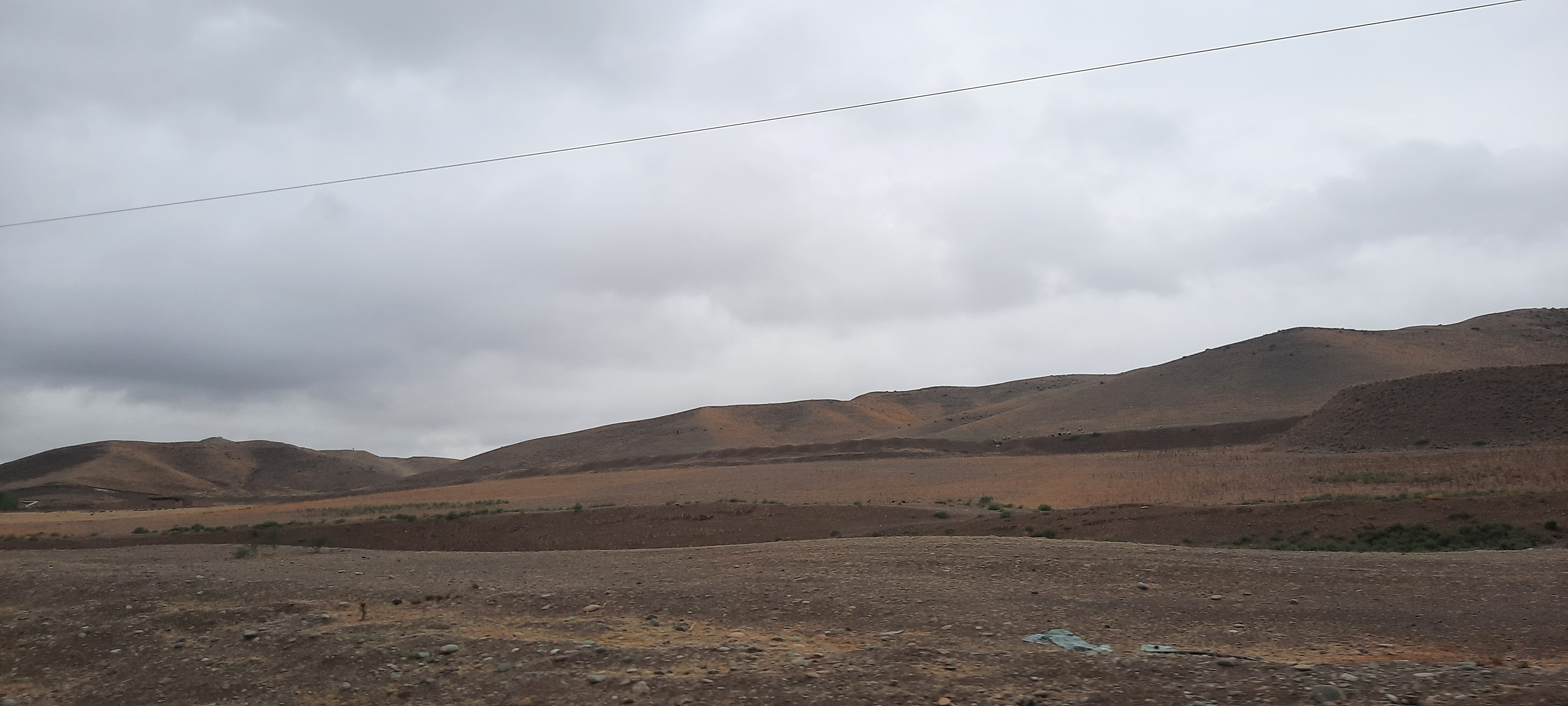
General view of Fuzuli's landscape.

On 28 October, President of Azerbaijan, Ilham Aliyev, stated that the Azerbaijani forces had seized control of Birinci Ağalı, İkinci Ağalı, Üçüncü Ağalı, Zərnəli in Zangilan, Mandılı in Fuzuli, Qazanzəmi, Xanağabulaq, Çüllü, Quşçular, and Qaraağac in Jabrayil. On 2 November, President of Azerbaijan, Ilham Aliyev stated that the Azerbaijani forces had seized control of Çaprand, Hacı İsaqlı, and Qoşabulaq in Jabrayil District, as well as Dərə Gilətağ, and Böyük Gilətağ in Zangilan District. Next day, the Azerbaijani MoD stated that Füzuli was being rocketed with BM-30 Smerches from the territory of Armenia; Armenia issued a denial.

== Casualties ==
=== Military casualties ===
As of 20 October, the Azerbaijani authorities claimed that at least 40 Armenian servicemen were killed. Azerbaijan doesn't disclose its own military casualties.

=== Equipment losses ===
As of 20 October, the Azerbaijani authorities have stated that the Azerbaijani forces have destroyed at least 7 tanks, 6 other vehicles, 4 BM-21 Grad systems, 1 D-30 howitzers, 3 Tor-M2 km missile systems, downed 2 UAVs and 1 Su-25, and captured many tanks and IFVs.

=== Civilian casualties ===
As of 20 October, the Azerbaijani authorities have reported that 1 Azerbaijani civilian was killed and 6 more were injured in Fuzuli.
