= Ağalı =

Ağalı or Agaly may refer to:

- Ağalı, Agdash, Azerbaijan
- Ağalı, Barda, Azerbaijan
- Ağalı, Zangilan (disambiguation)
  - Birinci Ağalı, Azerbaijan
  - İkinci Ağalı, Azerbaijan
  - Üçüncü Ağalı, Azerbaijan

== See also ==
- Agali (disambiguation)
