= Yemazli =

Yemazli may refer to:

- Yemazlu, Armenia
- Yeməzli, Azerbaijan
  - Aşağı Yeməzli, Azerbaijan
  - Orta Yeməzli, Azerbaijan
  - Yuxarı Yeməzli, Azerbaijan
