= Şəybəy =

- Location within Azerbaijan
- Coordinates: 39°23′31″N 47°11′14″E
- Country: Azerbaijan
- Rayon: Jabrayil
- Time zone: UTC+4 (AZT)

Şəybəy (also, Sheybey) is a village situated in Jabrayil district of Azerbaijan, being placed on the left bank of Chaylag River (the left tributary of Araz River) 14 km east of the city of JabrayilAzerbaijan.

== Toponym ==
According to the “Encyclopaedic Dictionary of Toponyms of Azerbaijan”, the village was originally called Shafibeyli (according to a local legend, it was founded by Shafi Bey, a native from the Iranian Azerbaijan). Later the village began to be called Sheybey in honour of the son of Shafi Bey.

== History ==
According to a local legend, the village was founded by Shafi Bey, a native from the Iranian Azerbaijan.

During the years of the Russian Empire, the village of Shafi-beylu was part of the Jabrayil district, Elizavetpol province.

During the Soviet years, the village was part of the Jabrayil district of Azerbaijan SSR. The village was captured by Armenian forces in the First Karabakh War and was destroyed.

On the evening of October 3, Azerbaijani President Ilham Aliyev said that the Azerbaijani Army liberated the villages of Talysh in Terter, Mehdili, Chakhyrly, Ashaghy-Maralyan, Sheybey, Guyjag in Jabrayil and Ashaghy-Abdurahmanly in Fuzuli districts of Azerbaijan. The Ministry of Defence of Azerbaijan officially confirmed the liberation of these villages by the armed forces of Azerbaijan.

BBC later reported that all the villages liberated in the south, according to Azerbaijan, judging by satellite images, lie in ruins and have been completely or almost completely abandoned since the Azerbaijani population left them in the early 1990s to escape the advancing Armenians. It's currently uninhabited.

On 7 October 2020, the Azerbaijani Ministry of Defence published a footage that shows the village of Sheybey under Azerbaijani control.

== Population ==
According to the “Code of statistical data of the Transcaucasian region population, extracted from the family lists of 1886”, in the village of Shafi-beylu, Guyjag rural district, Jabrayil district, there were 26 dym where lived 127 Azerbaijanis (listed as “Tatars”) residents, who were peasants.

According to the “Caucasian Calendar” for 1912, 192 people lived in the village of Shafibeylu, Karyagin district, mostly Azerbaijanis, indicated in the calendar as “Tatars”.
