= Cahangirbəyli =

Jahangirbeyli Cahangirbəyli
- Location within Azerbaijan
- Coordinates: 39°03′09″N 46°44′20″E
- Country: Azerbaijan
- District: Zangilan
- Time zone: UTC+4 (AZT)

Jahangirbeyli (Azerbaijani: Cahangirbəyli) is a village located in Zangilan District, Azerbaijan. The village is situated on the left bank of the Okhchuchay River, southeast of Zangilan and northeast of Minjivan, at an altitude of 409 m above sea level.

== History ==
According to the results of the Azerbaijani Agricultural Census of 1921, Jahangirbeyli with the Javadbayli village of Zangilan rural district of the Gubadli district of Azerbaijan SSR, was inhabited by 335 people (83 households), the predominant nationality being Azerbaijani Turks.

As of 1 January 1933, Jahangirbeyli together with the villages of Gizin, Tiri, Valigulubayli formed the Jahangirbeyli village council of Zangilan district of the Azerbaijan SSR. The village had a population of 75 people (32 households, 36 men and 39 women). The national composition of the entire village council was 100% Turkic (Azerbaijanis).

In October 1993, during the First Karabakh War, the territory of the Zangilan district was occupied by Armenian forces and was destroyed. Residential buildings, a village school, and a middle ages cemetery were destroyed.

On 21 October 2020, during the Second Karabakh War, Azerbaijani President Ilham Aliyev announced that "Azerbaijani Army liberated from occupation the village of Jahangirbeyli".

On May 4, 2023, the President of the Republic of Azerbaijan Ilham Aliyev visited the village, taking part in the ceremony of laying the foundation of the village.

== Notable people ==
- Elnur Nuriyev — National Hero of Azerbaijan.
