= Bartaz (village) =

- Location within Azerbaijan
- Coordinates: 38°58′58″N 46°35′08″E
- Country: Azerbaijan
- District: Zangilan
- Time zone: UTC+4 (AZT)

Bartaz (Azerbaijani: Bartaz) is a village located in Zangilan district of Azerbaijan. It is situated in the administrative-territorial rural district of the village of Bartaz.

== Geography ==
The village is placed on the left bank of the Bartaz River, 34 km southwest of the city of Zangilan.

== History ==
According to the results of the Azerbaijani Agricultural Census of 1921, Bartaz, Ordakli rural district of Gubadli district, Azerbaijan SSR, had a population of 581 people (175 households), the predominant nationality being Azerbaijani Turks.

According to the administrative division of 1961, the village of Bartaz was the centre of the Bartaz village council of the Zangilan district of the Azerbaijan SSR, which also included the settlements of Vejnali, Gargulu, Amirkhanli, settlements, near the Aghband railway station and near the Bartaz railway station.

As of 1976, 654 people lived in Bartaz. Here were developed: cultivation of agricultural crops, sericulture and livestock breeding. There was a secondary school, library, club and other infrastructure facilities.

On 22 October 2020, during the Second Karabakh War, the Azerbaijani Army regained the control over the village of Bartaz

== Toponym ==
The village appeared as a result of the settlement of families from the Ordubad and Samukh districts in the area of Pari Bartaz. The settlement got its name from the mountain of the same name in this area.
