= Yeməzli =

Yeməzli may refer to:

- Aşağı Yeməzli, Azerbaijan
- Orta Yeməzli, Azerbaijan
- Yuxarı Yeməzli, Azerbaijan
