= Agali =

Agali may refer to several places:

- Agali monastery, in Visigothic Spain
- Agali, Palakkad, a village in Palakkad district, Kerala, India
- Agali (gram panchayat), a Gram panchayat of Palakkad district, Kerala, India
- Agali mandal, a mandal in Anantapur district, Andhra Pradesh, India
- Agali, India, within the mandal
- Agali, Estonia, village in Võnnu Parish, Tartu County, Estonia
- Lake Agali, Estonia
- Agali River, Estonia

== See also ==
- Ağalı (disambiguation), places in Azerbaijan
