= Kargulu =

Kargulu may refer to:

- Qarğılı, Azerbaijan
- Qarqulu, Azerbaijan
