= Həkəri =

Həkəri may refer to:

- Həkəri, Qubadli, Azerbaijan
- Həkəri, Zangilan, Azerbaijan
- Hakari (river), Azerbaijan
- Həkəri FK (Azerbaijani: Həkəri Futbol Klubu), a football club based in Baku

== See also ==
- Hakkari, a historical mountainous region within modern Turkey and Iraq
- Hakkâri Province, Turkey
- Hakkâri, capital city of Hakkâri Province
