= Tinli =

Tinli may refer to:

- Tinli, Jabrayil, Azerbaijan
- Tinli, Qubadli, Azerbaijan
