= Çaxırlı =

Çaxırlı or Caxırlı or Chakhirly or Chakhyrly may refer to:

- Çaxırlı, Goychay, Azerbaijan
- Çaxırlı, Imishli, Azerbaijan
- Çaxırlı, Jabrayil, Azerbaijan
- Çaxırlı, Masally, Azerbaijan
