= Ağalı, Zangilan =

Ağalı, Zangilan may refer to:

- Birinci Ağalı, first Ağalı
- İkinci Ağalı, second Ağalı
- Üçüncü Ağalı, third Ağalı
