= Raband =

Raband may refer to:

- Rəbənd, Azerbaijan
- Rah Band-e Olya, Iran
