= Gilətagh =

Gilətağ or Gilətagh or Gilətag may refer to:

- Gilətağ, Azerbaijan
- Dərə Gilətağ, Azerbaijan
- Böyük Gilətağ, Azerbaijan
