= Sofulu =

Sofulu may refer to:

- Sofulu, Agdam, Azerbaijan
- Sofulu, Jabrayil, Azerbaijan
- Sofulu, Qazakh, an enclave-village of Azerbaijan, occupied by Armenia since 1992
- Soufli, a city in Greece, whose Turkish name is Sofulu
