= Tulus =

Tulus may refer to:

- Tulus (singer), Indonesian singer
  - Tulus (album), a 2011 album by the singer
- Tulus (band), Norwegian band
- Tulus (village), village in Azerbaijan
