= Asad Asadov =

National Hero of Azerbaijan

- Əsəd Soltan oğlu Əsədov
- Born: March 22, 1956; Zangilan, Azerbaijan SSR
- Died: October 29, 1991 (aged 35); Khojaly, Azerbaijan
- Military career
- Allegiance: Azerbaijan
- Branch: Azerbaijani Air and Air Defence Force
- Service years: 1976–1991
- Conflicts: First Nagorno-Karabakh War
- Awards: National Hero of Azerbaijan; 1992

Asad Soltan oghlu Asadov (Azerbaijani: Əsəd Soltan oğlu Əsədov) (22 March 1956, Zangilan, Azerbaijan SSR - 29 October 1991, Khojaly, Azerbaijan) was the National Hero of Azerbaijan and warrior during the First Nagorno-Karabakh War.

== Early life and education ==
Asadov was born on March 22, 1956, in Turabad village of Zangilan raion of Azerbaijan SSR. In 1975, he completed his secondary education at Mincivan village secondary school. Asadov served in the Soviet Armed Forces. He completed his military service in Krasnokutsky District of Saratov Oblast of Russia. Then he was admitted to the Krasnokutsk Aviation School.

=== Personal life ===
Asadov was married and had four children.

== First Nagorno-Karabakh War ==
Asad Asadov was the commander of the AN-2 plane of Yevlakh Aviation Company. On October 29, 1991, Asadov flew to the war zone of Nagorno Karabakh with his technical personnel. The AN-2 plane operated by Asadov was shot down by the Armenian militants and the whole crew and passengers were tragically killed.

== Honors ==
Asad Soltan oghlu Asadov was posthumously awarded the title of the "National Hero of Azerbaijan" by Presidential Decree No. 337 dated 25 November 1992.

He was buried at a cemetery in Zangilan District. The secondary school in Turabad village of Zangilan raion and one of the streets in Mincivan were named after him.

== See also ==
- First Nagorno-Karabakh War
- List of National Heroes of Azerbaijan
- Azerbaijani Air and Air Defence Force
- 1992 Azerbaijani Mil Mi-8 shootdown

== Sources ==
- Fəxrəddin Quliyev, "Milli qəhrəmanlar", "Məktəb" qəzeti, No.39(304), 20 oktyabr 2014-cü il. səh.1
- Vüqar Əsgərov. "Azərbaycanın Milli Qəhrəmanları" (Yenidən işlənmiş II nəşr). Bakı: "Dərələyəz-M", 2010, səh. 96.
