= Gavali =

Gavali may refer to:

- Gavali (caste), an Indian social group
- Havalı, a place in Azerbaijan
- Gavali, Karnataka a place in Belgaum district, Karnataka, India
- Gavali, Udupi, a village in Udupi dist. Karnataka, India
- Gavali, Iran, a village in Zanjan Province, Iran
