= Turabad =

- Location within Azerbaijan
- Coordinates: 39°02′36″N 46°43′07″E
- Country: Azerbaijan
- Rayon: Zangilan
- Time zone: UTC+4 (AZT)

Turabad is a village situated in Zangilan district of Azerbaijan. It is located on the right bank of the Okhchuchay River, southeast of Zangilan and north of Minjivan at an altitude of 409 m above sea level.

A native of the village is Asad Asadov, a military pilot and National Hero of Azerbaijan.

== History ==
According to the results of the Azerbaijani Agricultural Census of 1921, Turabad and the village of Babayugly of the Gubadly district of Azerbaijan SSR were inhabited by 153 people (44 households), the predominant nationality being Azerbaijani Turks.

In 1993, during the First Karabakh War, the territory of the Turabad village was occupied by Armenian forces and was destroyed.

On 21 October 2020, Azerbaijani President Ilham Aliyev announced that during the Second Karabakh War, Azerbaijani Army liberated the village of Turabad from occupation.

== Notable natives ==
- Asad Asadov — National Hero of Azerbaijan.
