= Nəcəflər =

- Location within Azerbaijan
- Coordinates: 39°06′51″N 46°30′43″E
- Country: Azerbaijan
- Rayon: Zangilan
- Time zone: UTC+4 (AZT)
  - Summer (DST): UTC+5 (AZT)

Nəcəflər (also, Nadzhaflar and Nadzhaflyar) is a village in the Zangilan Rayon of Azerbaijan.
