= Qaraxanbəyli =

Qaraxanbəyli or Garakhanbeyli or Karakhan-begly may refer to:

- Qaraxanbəyli, Fizuli, Azerbaijan
- Qaraxanbəyli, Nakhchivan, Azerbaijan
