= Pirveys =

- Location within Azerbaijan
- Coordinates: 39°09′45″N 46°27′53″E
- Country: Azerbaijan
- District: Zangilan
- Time zone: UTC+4 (AZT)
  - Summer (DST): UTC+5 (AZT)

Pirveys is a village in the Zangilan District of Azerbaijan.
