= Bartaz (town) =

- Location within Azerbaijan
- Coordinates: 38°57′25″N 46°38′50″E
- Country: Azerbaijan
- District: Zangilan
- Time zone: UTC+4 (AZT)
  - Summer (DST): UTC+5 (AZT)

Bartaz is a town in the Zangilan District of Azerbaijan.
