= Ağakişilər =

- Location within Azerbaijan
- Coordinates: 39°13′15″N 46°39′28″E
- Country: Azerbaijan
- District: Zangilan
- Time zone: UTC+4 (AZT)
  - Summer (DST): UTC+5 (AZT)

Ağakişilər is a village in the Zangilan Rayon of Azerbaijan.
