= Şayıflı =

Village in Zangilan, Azerbaijan

- Location within Azerbaijan
- Coordinates: 39°08′10″N 46°31′22″E
- Country: Azerbaijan
- Rayon: Zangilan
- Time zone: UTC+4 (AZT)
  - Summer (DST): UTC+5 (AZT)

Şayıflı (also, Shayyfly) is a village in the Zangilan Rayon of Azerbaijan.
