= Serifan =

Serifan may refer to:

- Serifan (DC Comics), a character in the Forever People comics
- Şərifan, Azerbaijan
