= Quyudərə Xəştab =

- Location within Azerbaijan
- Coordinates: 39°10′18″N 46°33′41″E
- Country: Azerbaijan
- Rayon: Zangilan
- Time zone: UTC+4 (AZT)
  - Summer (DST): UTC+5 (AZT)

Quyudərə Xəştab (also, Kuyudere Kheshtab and Guyudara Khashtab) is a village in the Zangilan Rayon of Azerbaijan.
