= Papy =

Papy may refer to:

- Papı, a village in the Jabrayil Rayon of Azerbaijan
- Papy (2009 film), a film directed by Djo Tunda Wa Munga
- Papy (2022 film), a Russian children's comedy-drama film

== See also ==
- Pappy
