= Maralyan =

Maralyan or Maral’yan may refer to:

- Aşağı Maralyan, Azerbaijan
- Yuxarı Maralyan, Azerbaijan
