= Üzümçülər =

Village in Azerbaijan

Üzümçülər is a village in the Zangilan Rayon of Azerbaijan, located in the country's southwestern region near the Armenian border. Situated along the left bank of the Okhchuchay River at an elevation of 480 meters above sea level, the village was occupied by Armenian forces during the First Nagorno-Karabakh War in 1993 and subsequently controlled by Azerbaijani troops on October 22, 2020, during the Second Nagorno-Karabakh War. The toponym "Üzümçülər" derives from the Azerbaijani word for "grape growers," reflecting the area's historical viticulture traditions. As part of post-war reconstruction efforts, the village is included in Azerbaijan's "Great Return" program to resettle displaced persons.

Key Sources:
