= Mandili =

Mandili may refer to:

- Steven Mandili, American sex offender
- Mandılı, a village in Azerbaijan
- Mandili, Greece, a village in Nea Zichni, Greece
- Trio Mandili, a Georgian music group

== See also ==
- Anthony Mandile, American politician
