= İsgəndərbəyli =

- Location within Azerbaijan
- Coordinates: 39°11′16″N 46°38′49″E
- Country: Azerbaijan
- Rayon: Zangilan
- Time zone: UTC+4 (AZT)
  - Summer (DST): UTC+5 (AZT)

İsgəndərbəyli (also, Iskenderbeyli and İskəndərbəyli) is a village in the Zangilan Rayon of Azerbaijan.
