= Alıbəyli, Agdam =

Alıbəyli
- Municipality
- Location within Azerbaijan Location within Karabakh Economic Region
- Coordinates: 40°05′44″N 47°09′32″E
- Country: Azerbaijan
- District: Aghdam

Population
  - Total: 3,366
- Time zone: UTC+4 (AZT)
  - Summer (DST): UTC+5 (AZT)

Alıbəyli (also, Alybeili and Alybeyli) is a village and municipality in the Aghdam District of Azerbaijan. It has a population of 3,366. The municipality consists of the villages of Kiçikli, Birinci Alıbəyli, and İkinci Alıbəyli.
