= Sarıl =

- Location within Azerbaijan
- Coordinates: 39°09′00″N 46°45′35″E
- Country: Azerbaijan
- District: Zangilan

Population (2015)
  - Total: 34
- Time zone: UTC+4 (AZT)

Sarıl (Saryl) is a village in the Zangilan District of Azerbaijan.

== History ==
The village was located in the Armenian-occupied territories surrounding Nagorno-Karabakh, coming under the control of ethnic Armenian forces in October 1993 during the First Nagorno-Karabakh War. The village subsequently became part of the breakaway Republic of Artsakh as part of its Kashatagh Province, referred to as Amiryan (Armenian: Ամիրյան). It was recaptured by Azerbaijan during the Aras Valley campaign in the 2020 Nagorno-Karabakh war.
