= Sirik =

Sirik may refer to:

- Sirik, Azerbaijan
- Sirik, Indonesia
- Sirik, Iran, the capital city of Sirik County, Hormozgan province, Iran
- Sirik County, an administrative division of Hormozgan province, Iran
- Sirik Rural District, an administrative division of Sirik County, Hormozgan province, Iran
