= Yusiflər =

- Location within Azerbaijan
- Coordinates: 39°07′12″N 46°31′10″E
- Country: Azerbaijan
- Rayon: Zangilan
- Time zone: UTC+4 (AZT)
  - Summer (DST): UTC+5 (AZT)

Yusiflər (also, Yusiflar and Yusuflyar) is a village in the Zangilan Rayon of Azerbaijan.
