= Ağ oyuq =

- Location within Azerbaijan
- Coordinates: 39°06′22″N 46°40′04″E
- Country: Azerbaijan
- District: Zangilan
- Time zone: UTC+4 (AZT)
  - Summer (DST): UTC+5 (AZT)

Ağ oyuq (Agh oyug) is a town in the Zangilan District of Azerbaijan.
