= Keçikli =

- Location within Azerbaijan
- Coordinates: 39°05′46″N 46°34′23″E
- Country: Azerbaijan
- Rayon: Zangilan
- Time zone: UTC+4 (AZT)
  - Summer (DST): UTC+5 (AZT)

Keçikli (also, Kechikli) is a village in the Zangilan Rayon of Azerbaijan.
