= Yenikənd, Zangilan =

Yenikənd
- Location within Azerbaijan
- Coordinates: 39°10′31.4″N 46°43′51.9″E
- Country: Azerbaijan
- District: Zangilan
- Time zone: UTC+4 (AZT)
  - Summer (DST): UTC+5 (AZT)

Yenikənd (Yenikend) is a village in the Zangilan District of Azerbaijan.
