= Üdgün =

- Location within Azerbaijan
- Coordinates: 39°03′17″N 46°41′29″E
- Country: Azerbaijan
- Rayon: Zangilan
- Time zone: UTC+4 (AZT)
  - Summer (DST): UTC+5 (AZT)

Üdgün (also, Udgun) is a village in the Zangilan Rayon of Azerbaijan.
