= Hacallı, Zangilan =

Hacallı
- Location within Azerbaijan
- Coordinates: 39°07′05″N 46°48′06″E
- Country: Azerbaijan
- Rayon: Zangilan
- Time zone: UTC+4 (AZT)
  - Summer (DST): UTC+5 (AZT)

Hacallı (also, Hajally, Hajalli, and Hacıalılı) is a village in the Zangilan Rayon of Azerbaijan.
