= Vənədli =

- Location within Azerbaijan
- Coordinates: 39°09′05″N 46°38′12″E
- Country: Azerbaijan
- Rayon: Zangilan
- Time zone: UTC+4 (AZT)
  - Summer (DST): UTC+5 (AZT)

Vənədli (also, Vanadli and Venedli) is a village in the Zangilan Rayon of Azerbaijan.
