= Qıraq Müşlan =

- Location within Azerbaijan
- Coordinates: 39°03′50″N 46°40′49″E
- Country: Azerbaijan
- District: Zangilan

Population (2015)
  - Total: 126
- Time zone: UTC+4 (AZT)

Qıraq Müşlan is a village in the Zangilan District of Azerbaijan.

== History ==
The village was located in the Armenian-occupied territories surrounding Nagorno-Karabakh, coming under the control of ethnic Armenian forces in 1993 during the First Nagorno-Karabakh War, subsequently becoming part of the breakaway Republic of Artsakh as part of its Kashatagh Province, being referred to as Alashkert (Armenian: Ալաշկերտ). It was recaptured by Azerbaijan on 21 October 2020 during the 2020 Nagorno-Karabakh war.
