= Zərnəli =

- Location within Azerbaijan
- Coordinates: 39°09′04″N 46°49′44″E
- Country: Azerbaijan
- District: Zangilan
- Time zone: UTC+4 (AZT)

Zərnəli is a village in the Zangilan District of Azerbaijan.

== History ==
The village was located in the Armenian-occupied territories surrounding Nagorno-Karabakh, coming under the control of ethnic Armenian forces during the First Nagorno-Karabakh War in the early 1990s. The village subsequently became part of the breakaway Republic of Artsakh as part of its Kashatagh Province, referred to as Vordnav (Armenian: Որդնավ). It was recaptured by Azerbaijan on 20 October 2020 during the 2020 Nagorno-Karabakh war.
