= Dəlləkli, Zangilan =

Dəlləkli
- Location within Azerbaijan
- Coordinates: 38°59′22″N 46°39′36″E
- Country: Azerbaijan
- Rayon: Zangilan
- Time zone: UTC+4 (AZT)
  - Summer (DST): UTC+5 (AZT)

Dəlləkli (Azerbaijani: Dəlləkli) is a village located in the administrative-territorial district of the village of Chopadara in Zangilan district, Azerbaijan.

== History ==
According to the "Statistical data collection on the population of the Transcaucasian region, extracted from the family lists of 1886", in the village of Dallakli, Bartaz rural district, Zangezur district, Elizavetpol province, there were 29 dym and 162 Azerbaijanis (in the source listed as "Tatars") who were Shiites by religion. The entire population was state peasants.

During the First Karabakh War, in 1993, the village was occupied by the Armenian armed forces. On 22 October 2020, during the Second Karabakh War, the Azerbaijani Army regained the control over the village of Dallakli and liberated it.
