= Məlikli, Zangilan =

Məlikli
- Location within Azerbaijan
- Coordinates: 39°04′17″N 46°41′21″E
- Country: Azerbaijan
- District: Zangilan

Population (2015)
  - Total: 118
- Time zone: UTC+4 (AZT)

Məlikli (also Melikli) is a village of the Zangilan District in Azerbaijan.

== History ==
The village was located in the Armenian-occupied territories surrounding Nagorno-Karabakh, coming under the control of ethnic Armenian forces in the autumn of 1993, during the First Nagorno-Karabakh War. The village subsequently became part of the breakaway Republic of Artsakh as part of its Kashatagh Province, referred to as Mush (Armenian: Մուշ). It was recaptured by Azerbaijan during the 2020 Nagorno-Karabakh war.
