= Çöpədərə =

- Location within Azerbaijan
- Coordinates: 39°00′21″N 46°38′25″E
- Country: Azerbaijan
- District: Zangilan

Population (2015)
  - Total: 15
- Time zone: UTC+4 (AZT)

Çöpədərə (Chopadara) is a village in the Zangilan District of Azerbaijan.

== History ==
The village was located in the Armenian-occupied territories surrounding Nagorno-Karabakh, coming under the control of ethnic Armenian forces during the First Nagorno-Karabakh War in October 1993. The village subsequently became part of the breakaway Republic of Artsakh as part of its Kashatagh Province, referred to as Tsobadzor (Armenian: Ծոբաձոր). It was recaptured by Azerbaijan on 22 October 2020 during the 2020 Nagorno-Karabakh war.
