= Vejnəli =

- Location within Azerbaijan
- Coordinates: 38°55′59″N 46°32′58″E
- Country: Azerbaijan
- District: Zangilan
- Time zone: UTC+4 (AZT)
  - Summer (DST): UTC+5 (AZT)

Vejnəli (Vezhnali) is a village in the Zangilan District of Azerbaijan.
