= Ördəkli =

- Location within Azerbaijan
- Coordinates: 39°02′21″N 46°38′32″E
- Country: Azerbaijan
- Rayon: Zangilan
- Time zone: UTC+4 (AZT)

Ördəkli is a village located in the administrative-territorial district with the same name of Zangilan district of Azerbaijan. The village is situated on the bank of the Basitchay River.

== History ==
According to the “Code of statistical data of the Transcaucasian region population, extracted from the family lists of 1886”, in the village of Ordakli, Ordakli rural district, Zangezur district, Elizavetpol province, there were 63 dym and 292 Azerbaijanis (in the source listed as "Tatars"), who were Shiites by religion. The entire population was state peasants.

According to the results of the Azerbaijani Agricultural Census of 1921, Ordakli, Ordakli rural district, Gubadli district, Azerbaijan SSR, was inhabited by 243 people (80 households), the predominant nationality was Azerbaijani Turks (Azerbaijanis).

During the First Karabakh War in 1993, the village was occupied by Armenian armed forces. After the occupation, the village was destroyed. Residential buildings, a village school, village library and social club were destroyed.

On 9 November 2020, during the Second Karabakh War, the Azerbaijani Army regained the control over the village of Ordakli and liberated it.
