= Tinli, Qubadli =

Tinli
- Location within Azerbaijan
- Coordinates: 39°11′48.3″N 46°42′46.3″E
- Country: Azerbaijan
- District: Zangilan
- Time zone: UTC+4 (AZT)
  - Summer (DST): UTC+5 (AZT)

Tinli is a village in the Qubadli Rayon of Azerbaijan. In 1993, Tinli was occupied by the Armed Forces of Armenia during the First Nagorno-Karabakh War. On November 9, 2020, at the ceasefire of the Nagorno-Karabakh War, the Ministry of Defence issued a declaration of freedom of the village by President Ilham Aliyev.
