= Babaylı =

- Location within Azerbaijan
- Coordinates: 39°09′51″N 46°47′48″E
- Country: Azerbaijan
- District: Zangilan
- Time zone: UTC+4 (AZT)
  - Summer (DST): UTC+5 (AZT)

Babaylı (Babayli) is a village in the Zangilan District of Azerbaijan.

In 1993, during the First Karabakh War, the territory of the Zangilan district was occupied by Armenian forces and was destroyed. Residential buildings, a village school, and a middle ages cemetery were destroyed.
