= Qaradərə =

- Location within Azerbaijan
- Coordinates: 39°01′44″N 46°39′25″E
- Country: Azerbaijan
- Rayon: Zangilan
- Time zone: UTC+4 (AZT)
  - Summer (DST): UTC+5 (AZT)

Qaradərə (also, Karadera and Karadere) is a village in the Zangilan Rayon of Azerbaijan.
