= Qoşabulaq, Jabrayil =

Village in Azerbaijan, recaptured in 2020

Qoşabulaq
- Location within Azerbaijan
- Coordinates: 39°17′05.8″N 46°53′55.4″E
- Country: Azerbaijan
- District: Jabrayil
- Time zone: UTC+4 (AZT)
  - Summer (DST): UTC+5 (AZT)

Qoşabulaq (Goshabulag) is a village in the Jabrayil District of Azerbaijan. The village was under the occupation of the self-proclaimed Republic of Artsakh since the First Nagorno-Karabakh war until the Second Nagorno-Karabakh war, when President of Azerbaijan, Ilham Aliyev announced the village's recapture by Azerbaijani forces on 2 November 2020.
