= Hovuslu =

- Location within Azerbaijan
- Coordinates: 39°22′28″N 46°55′00″E
- Country: Azerbaijan
- District: Jabrayil
- Time zone: UTC+4 (AZT)
  - Summer (DST): UTC+5 (AZT)

Hovuslu is a village in the Jabrayil District of Azerbaijan.

== History ==
The village was occupied by Armenian forces during the First Nagorno-Karabakh war. It was recaptured by Azerbaijan during the 2020 Nagorno-Karabakh war. Azerbaijan Ministry of defence published video footage from the village on 24 December 2020 showing full destruction of the village during the Armenian occupation.
