= Əmirxanlı, Zangilan =

Əmirxanlı
- Location within Azerbaijan
- Coordinates: 38°56′15″N 46°35′30″E
- Country: Azerbaijan
- Rayon: Zangilan
- Time zone: UTC+4 (AZT)
  - Summer (DST): UTC+5 (AZT)

Əmirxanlı (also, Amirkhanly and Emirkhanly) is a village in the Zangilan Rayon of Azerbaijan.

== History ==
From 1993 to 2020, Amirkhanli was under the control of Armenian forces. On 22 October 2020, Azerbaijan regained control of the village during the Second Nagorno-Karabakh War.
