= Nüsüs =

Coordinates: 39°25′N 46°55′E

Nüsüs is a village in the Jabrayil Rayon of Azerbaijan.
