= Qaradağlı, Fuzuli =

Qaradağlı
- Location within Azerbaijan Location within Karabakh Economic Region
- Coordinates: 39°30′46.9″N 47°04′37.6″E
- Country: Azerbaijan
- District: Fuzuli
- Time zone: UTC+4 (AZT)
  - Summer (DST): UTC+5 (AZT)

Qaradağlı is a village in the Fuzuli District of Azerbaijan.
