= İkinci Alıbəyli =

Village in Aghdam District, Azerbaijan

Coordinates: 39°09′N 46°45′E

İkinci Alıbəyli (also, Ikinji Alybeili) is a village in the municipality of Alıbəyli in the Aghdam District of Azerbaijan.
