= Rəbənd =

- Location within Azerbaijan
- Coordinates: 39°10′23″N 46°44′04″E
- Country: Azerbaijan
- District: Zangilan
- Time zone: UTC+4 (AZT)
  - Summer (DST): UTC+5 (AZT)

Rəbənd (Raband) is a village in the Zangilan District of Azerbaijan.
