= Çapand =

- Village
- Location within Azerbaijan
- Coordinates: 39°22′18″N 47°07′52″E
- Country: Azerbaijan
- Rayon: Jabrayil
- Time zone: UTC+4 (AZT)
  - Summer (DST): UTC+5 (AZT)

Çapand is a village in the Jabrayil Rayon of Azerbaijan.
