= Mehdili, Jabrayil =

Mehdili
- Location within Azerbaijan
- Coordinates: 39°22′51″N 47°16′31″E
- Country: Azerbaijan
- Rayon: Jabrayil

Population
  - Total: 0
- Time zone: UTC+4 (AZT)
  - Summer (DST): UTC+5 (AZT)

Mehdili is a village in the Jabrayil Rayon of Azerbaijan.

The village was captured by Armenian forces in the First Nagorno-Karabakh War. On October 3, 2020, the Azerbaijani Ministry of Defence announced that the Azerbaijani Army had taken control of the village.

== History ==
During the years of the Russian Empire, the village of Mekhtilu was part of Jabrayil district, Elizavetpol province. According to the “Code of statistical data of the Transcaucasian region population, extracted from the family lists of 1886”, in the village of Mehtilu of the Marjanly rural society there were 69 dym where lived 306 Azerbaijanis (listed as “Tatars”), who were Sunni by religion and peasants.

According to the publication “Administrative Division of the ASSR”, prepared in 1933 by the Department of National Economic Accounting of the Azerbaijan SSR (AzNEA), as of 1 January 1933, there were 440 residents (85 households, 220 men and 220 women). The national composition of the entire village council (Boyuk Marjanly, Chakhirly, Jojug Marjanly, Usublu) consisted 100% of Turks (Azerbaijanis).

The village was captured by Armenian forces in the First Karabakh War. On 3 October 2020, the village, according to the Ministry of Defence of Azerbaijan, came under the control of Azerbaijani Armed Forces.
