= Dərzili =

- Location within Azerbaijan
- Coordinates: 39°10′7″N 46°53′28″E
- Country: Azerbaijan
- Rayon: Jabrayil
- Time zone: UTC+4 (AZT)
  - Summer (DST): UTC+5 (AZT)

Dərzili (also, Derzili) is a village in the Jabrayil Rayon of Azerbaijan.
