= Arış =

- Location within Azerbaijan Location within Karabakh Economic Region
- Coordinates: 39°32′01.3″N 47°06′18.2″E
- Country: Azerbaijan
- District: Fuzuli
- Time zone: UTC+4 (AZT)
  - Summer (DST): UTC+5 (AZT)

Arış (Note: Transliterated as Arish or Arysh) is a village in the Fuzuli District of Azerbaijan.

== History ==
The village was captured by Armenian forces during the First Nagorno-Karabakh war and all of its original Azerbaijani inhabitants were driven out. It was administrated as part of the Askeran Province of the self-proclaimed Republic of Artsakh. The village was recaptured by Azerbaijan during the 2020 Nagorno-Karabakh war.
