= Qazanzəmi =

- Location within Azerbaijan
- Coordinates: 39°25′40″N 46°44′49″E
- Country: Azerbaijan
- District: Jabrayil
- Time zone: UTC+4 (AZT)
  - Summer (DST): UTC+5 (AZT)

Qazanzəmi (Gazanzami) is a village in the Jabrayil District of Azerbaijan. The Army of Azerbaijan recaptured the village on 28 October 2020.
