= Hacı İsaqlı =

Coordinates: 39°17′N 46°57′E

Hacı İsaqlı is a village in the Jabrayil Rayon of Azerbaijan.
