= Birinci Alıbəyli =

- Village
- Location within Azerbaijan
- Coordinates: 40°02′30.5″N 47°13′00.5″E
- Country: Azerbaijan
- District: Aghdam
- Municipality: Alıbəyli
- Time zone: UTC+4 (AZT)
  - Summer (DST): UTC+5 (AZT)

Birinci Alıbəyli (also, Birinji Alybeili) is a village in the municipality of Alıbəyli in the Aghdam District of Azerbaijan.
