= Kiçikli =

Village in Aghdam District, Azerbaijan

Coordinates: 40°06′N 47°08′E

Kiçikli is a village in the municipality of Üçoğlan in the Agdam Rayon of Azerbaijan.
