= Qaraağac, Jabrayil =

Qaraağac
- Location within Azerbaijan
- Coordinates: 39°23′16.6″N 46°48′33.3″E
- Country: Azerbaijan
- District: Jabrayil
- Time zone: UTC+4 (AZT)
  - Summer (DST): UTC+5 (AZT)

Qaraağac is a village in the Jabrayil Rayon of Azerbaijan.
