= Hakari (river) =

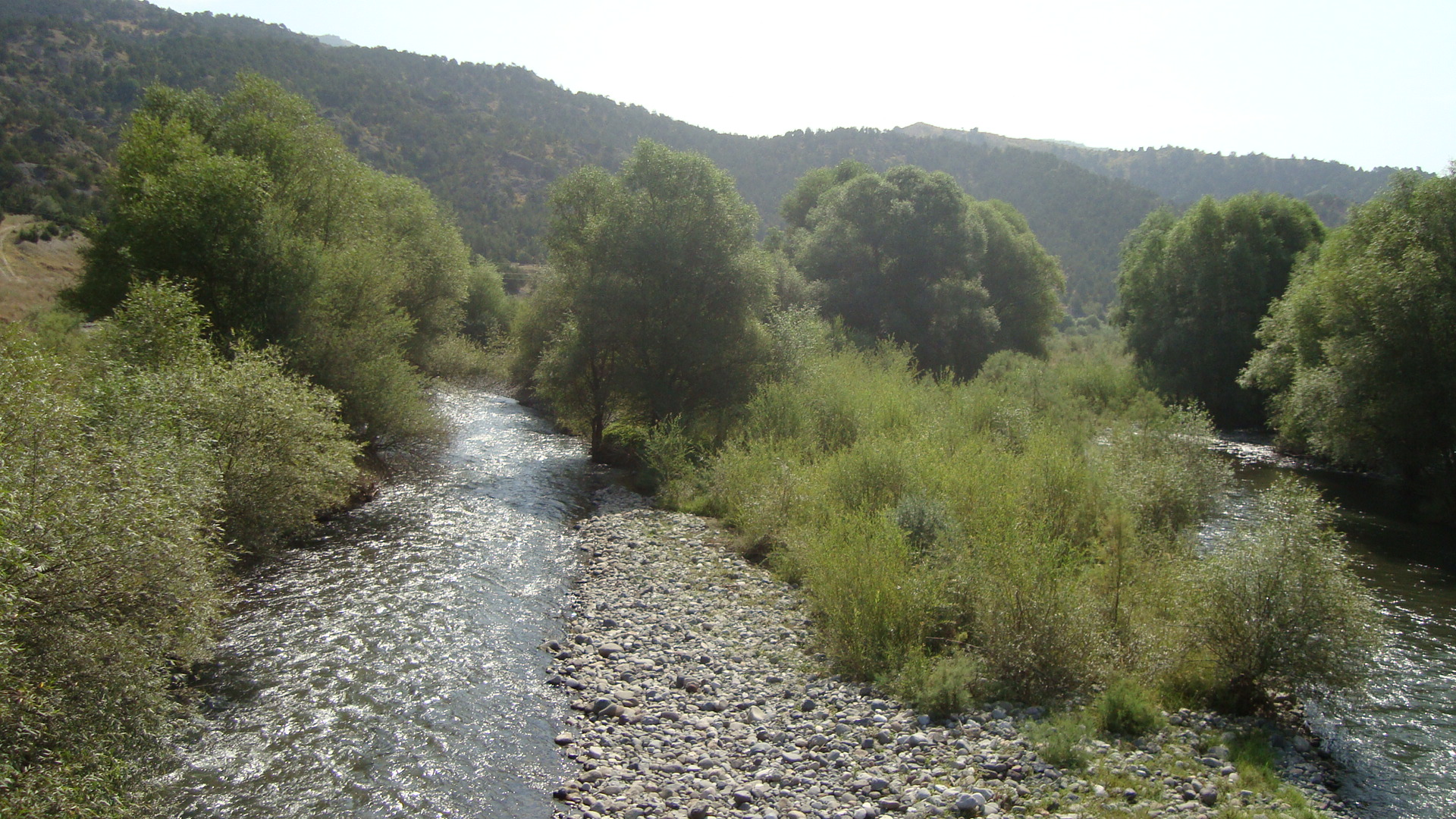
- The Hakari near the town of Lachin

Location
- Country: Azerbaijan

Physical characteristics
- Mouth: Aras
  - coordinates: 39°08′18″N 46°49′57″E
- Length: 128 km (80 mi)

Basin features
- Progression: Aras→ Kura→ Caspian Sea
- Tributaries
  - right: Vorotan

The Hakari (Azerbaijani: Həkəri, Armenian: Հագարի, romanized: Hagari) is a left tributary of the Aras river in Karabakh, Azerbaijan.

The river is 128 kilometres (80 mi) long. It originates in Lesser Caucasus mountains and flows through the Lachin, Qubadli and Zangilan districts of Azerbaijan. In a small area, it serves as a border with Armenia. Its largest right tributary is the Vorotan (called Bazarchay in Azerbaijan), which joins the Hakari in its lowermost section.

Populated places along the river, include Aganli (left bank), Alibayli (right bank), Mammadbayli (left bank) and Yenikend (right bank). The elevation difference between the source and mouth is 2,812 metres (9,226 ft). The river's water is used for irrigation and drinking. Fish like trout and Arctic cisco spawn in the Hakari.
