= Çaxırlı, Masally =

Çaxırlı
- Municipality
- Location within Azerbaijan
- Coordinates: 39°05′09″N 48°39′54″E
- Country: Azerbaijan
- Rayon: Masally

Population
  - Total: 1,934
- Time zone: UTC+4 (AZT)
  - Summer (DST): UTC+5 (AZT)

Çaxırlı (also, Chakhirly and Chakhyrly) is a village and municipality in the Masally Rayon of Azerbaijan. It has a population of 1,934.
