= Vəliqulubəyli =

Veligulubeyli
- Azerbaijani: Vəliqulubəyli
- Location within Azerbaijan
- Coordinates: 39°01′42″N 46°44′32″E
- Country: Azerbaijan
- District: Zangilan
- Time zone: UTC+4 (AZT)
  - Summer (DST): UTC+5 (AZT)

Veligulubeyli is a village in the Zangilan Rayon of Azerbaijan. Azerbaijan recaptured the village during 2020 Nagorno-Karabakh conflict. Azerbaijan Ministry of defence published video footages of the village on 23 December 2020 showing full destruction of Azerbaijanis' houses in the village during Armenian occupation. Buildings of Armenian who relocated to the village after occupation were in more or less habitable condition.
