= Sofulu, Agdam =

Sofulu
- Location within Azerbaijan Location within Karabakh Economic Region
- Coordinates: 40°08′26″N 46°52′32″E
- Country: Azerbaijan
- Rayon: Agdam
- Time zone: UTC+4 (AZT)
  - Summer (DST): UTC+5 (AZT)

Sofulu (Armenian: Սոֆուլու) is a village in the Agdam Rayon of Azerbaijan.
