= Kürdlər, Jabrayil =

Kürdlər
- Location within Azerbaijan
- Coordinates: 39°25′48.1″N 46°56′34.0″E
- Country: Azerbaijan
- District: Jabrayil
- Time zone: UTC+4 (AZT)
  - Summer (DST): UTC+5 (AZT)

Kürdlər is a village in the Jabrayil Rayon of Azerbaijan.
