= Yuxarı Yeməzli =

- Location within Azerbaijan
- Coordinates: 39°11′39″N 46°34′22″E
- Country: Azerbaijan
- Rayon: Zangilan
- Time zone: UTC+4 (AZT)
  - Summer (DST): UTC+5 (AZT)

Yuxarı Yeməzli (also, Yukhari Yemazlu and Yukhary Yemezli) is a village in the Zangilan Rayon of Azerbaijan.
