= Qovşudlu =

- Location within Azerbaijan
- Coordinates: 39°15′39.3″N 46°52′20.6″E
- Country: Azerbaijan
- District: Jabrayil
- Time zone: UTC+4 (AZT)
  - Summer (DST): UTC+5 (AZT)

Qovşudlu (Govshudlu) is a village in the Jabrayil District of Azerbaijan.
