= Məstalıbəyli =

- Location within Azerbaijan
- Coordinates: 39°10′55″N 46°55′36″E
- Country: Azerbaijan
- District: Jabrayil
- Time zone: UTC+4 (AZT)
  - Summer (DST): UTC+5 (AZT)

Məstalıbəyli (Mastalybeyli) is a village in the Jabrayil District of Azerbaijan.
