= Agali, Estonia =

Village in Estonia

- Village
- Location within Estonia
- Coordinates: 58.287222222222°N 27.289166666667°E
- Country: Estonia
- County: Tartu County
- Parish: Kastre Parish
- Time zone: UTC+2 (EET)
  - Summer (DST): UTC+3 (EEST)

Agali is a village in Kastre Parish, Tartu County in Estonia.
