= Həkəri, Zangilan =

Həkəri
- Location within Azerbaijan
- Coordinates: 39°07′38″N 46°48′48″E
- Country: Azerbaijan
- District: Zangilan
- Time zone: UTC+4 (AZT)
  - Summer (DST): UTC+5 (AZT)

Həkəri (Hakari) is a village in the Zangilan District of Azerbaijan. On 20 October 2020 President of Azerbaijan Ilham Aliyev announced that the village had been recaptured by the Azerbaijani forces.
