= Qarğılı =

- Municipality
- Location within Azerbaijan
- Coordinates: 39°12′N 48°15′E
- Country: Azerbaijan
- Rayon: Jalilabad

Population
  - Total: 805
- Time zone: UTC+4 (AZT)
  - Summer (DST): UTC+5 (AZT)

Qarğılı (also, Kargulu, Qarqulu, and Karguli) is a village and municipality in the Jalilabad Rayon of Azerbaijan. It has a population of 805.
