= Dərə Gilətağ =

- Location within Azerbaijan
- Coordinates: 39°09′14″N 46°36′49″E
- Country: Azerbaijan
- District: Zangilan
- Time zone: UTC+4 (AZT)
  - Summer (DST): UTC+5 (AZT)

Dərə Gilətağ is a village in the Zangilan District of Azerbaijan.
