= Böyük Gilətağ =

Boyuk Gilatagh
- Azerbaijani: Böyük Gilətağ
- Location within Azerbaijan
- Coordinates: 39°10′00″N 46°36′59″E
- Country: Azerbaijan
- District: Zangilan
- Time zone: UTC+4 (AZT)
  - Summer (DST): UTC+5 (AZT)

Böyük Gilətağ (also, Boyuk Gilatagh and Gilatagh) is a village in the Zangilan District, located in the south-west of the country of Azerbaijan.
