= Məmmədbəyli =

Mammadbeyli Azerbaijani: Məmmədbəyli
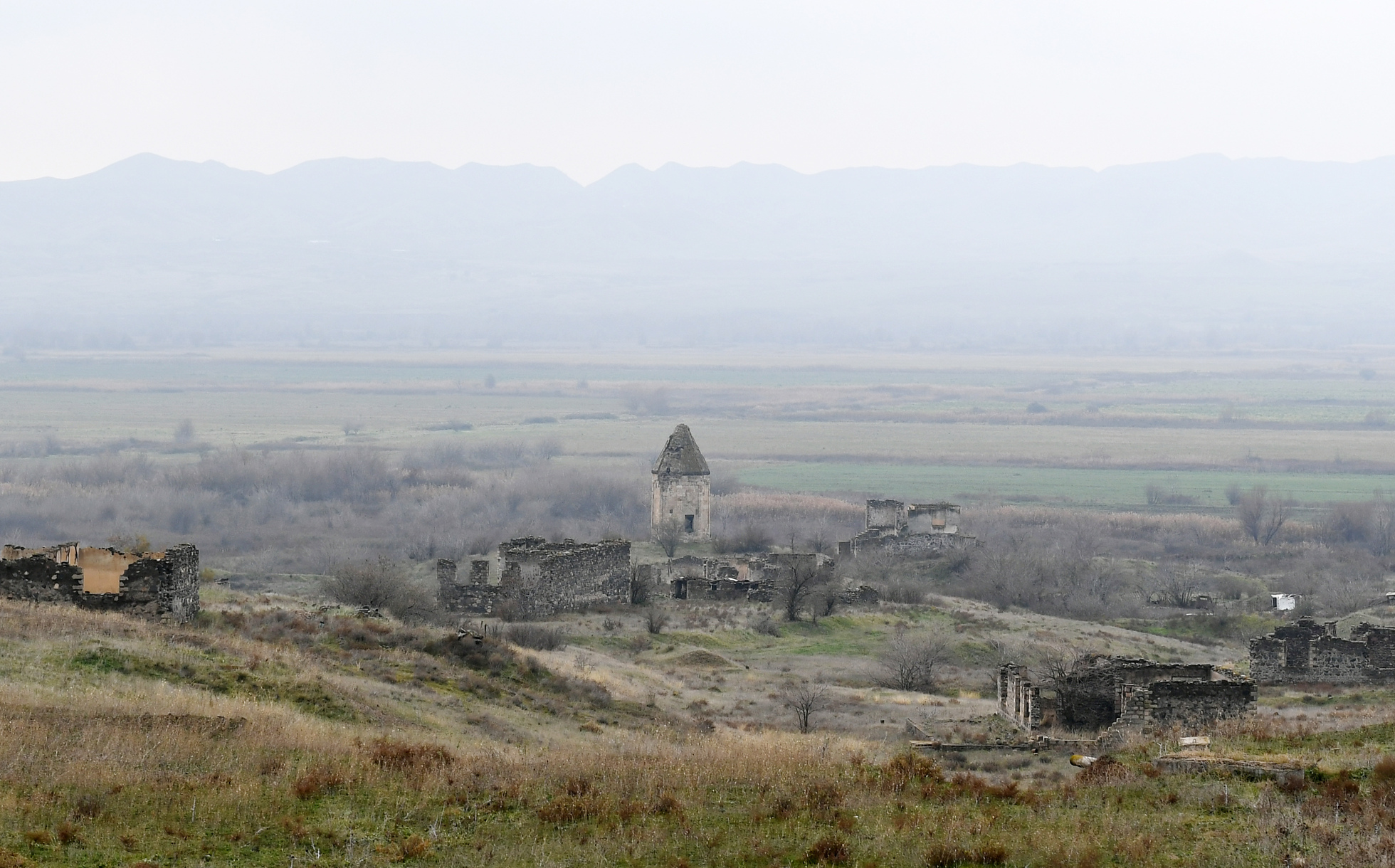

- Location within Azerbaijan
- Coordinates: 39°09′22″N 46°48′41″E
- Country: Azerbaijan
- District: Zangilan
- Time zone: UTC+4 (AZT)

Mammadbeyli (Azerbaijani: Məmmədbəyli) is a village in the Zangilan District of Azerbaijan. The village is situated on the bank of Hakari river.

== Toponym ==
The village was originally called Terekeme. In the 19th century it belonged to Mammadbay Zangilani, and therefore began to be named Mammadbayli in his honour.

== History ==
During the years of Russian Empire, the village of Mammadbayli was part of the Karyagin district of the Elizavetpol province.

During the Soviet years, the village was part of Zangilan district of Azerbaijan SSR. During the First Karabakh War in August 1993, the village was occupied by Armenian armed forces. After the occupation, the village was destroyed. Residential buildings, a village school, and a cemetery were destroyed.

On 20 October 2020, during the Second Karabakh War, the Azerbaijani Army regained the control over the village of Mammadbayli and liberated it.

== Population ==
According to the “Code of statistical data of the Transcaucasian region population, extracted from the family lists of 1886”, in the village of Terekeme (Mammadbayli) of Gavalin rural district of Jabrayil district were 93 dym and 426 Azerbaijanis (listed as “Tatars”) lived there, who were Shiites by religion and peasants.

According to the “Caucasian Calendar” of 1912, 761 people lived in the village of Mammadbayli, Karyagin district, mainly Azerbaijanis, listed in the calendar as “Tatars”.

According to data as of 1 January 1933, Mammadbayli was part of Mammadbayli rural district of Zangilan district of Azerbaijan SSR. The population was 796 people, 163 households (0 common and 163 individual, 387 men and 409 women).

== Cultural monuments ==
The mausoleum of Yahya ibn Muhammad al-Hajj, dating back to the beginning of the 14th century, is located in the village. The mausoleum was built in 1305, by architect Ali Majid ad-Din on the Silk Road. In 1975, excavation works in the underground part of the mausoleum were carried out, as result of which a sepulcher was found.

== Gallery ==
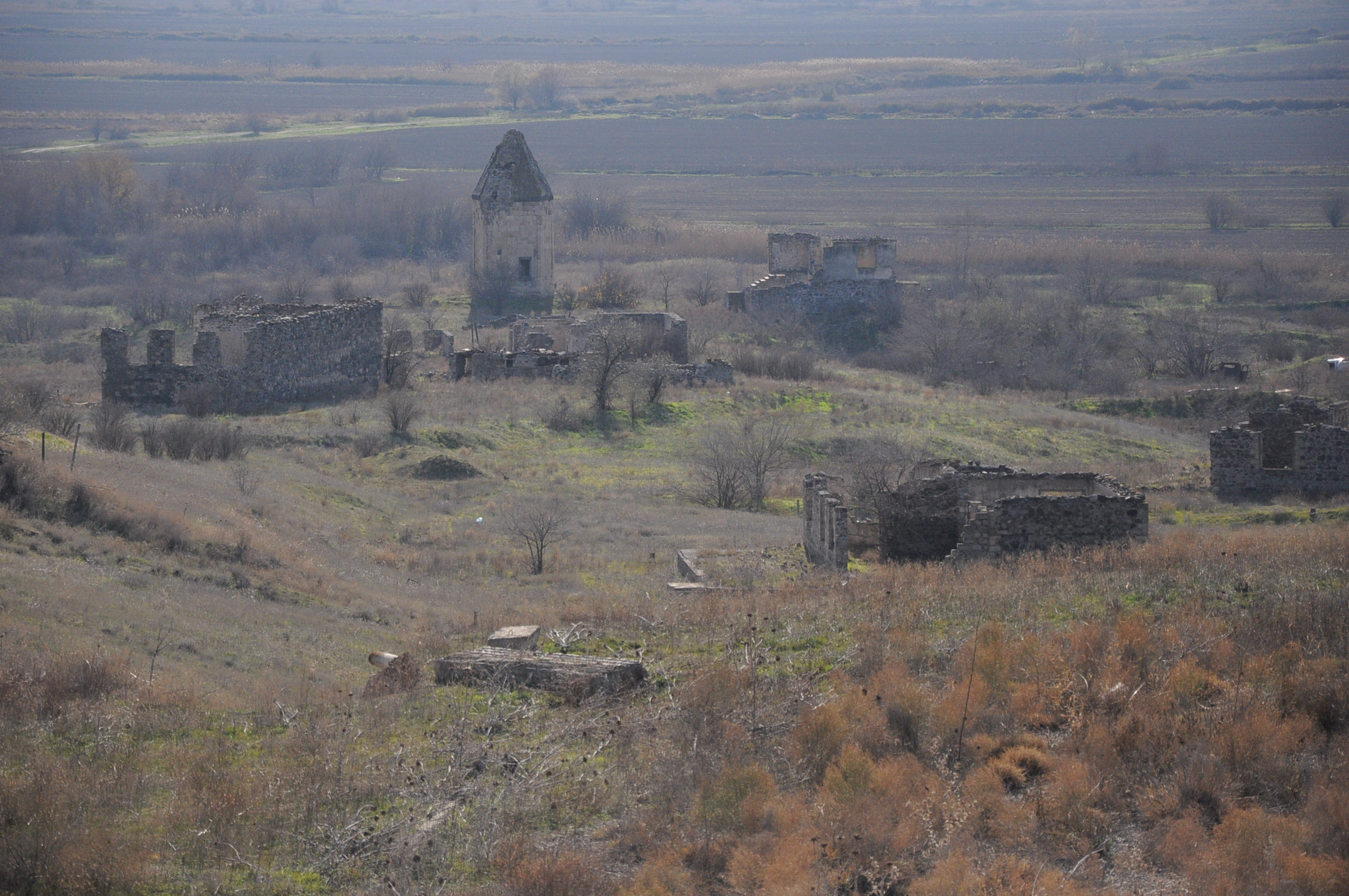

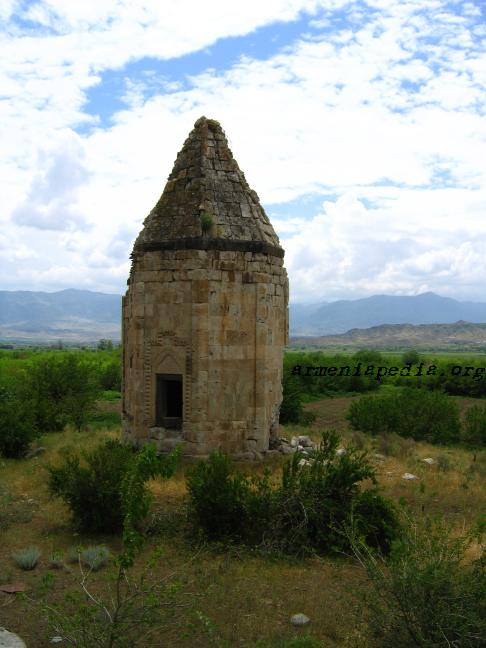

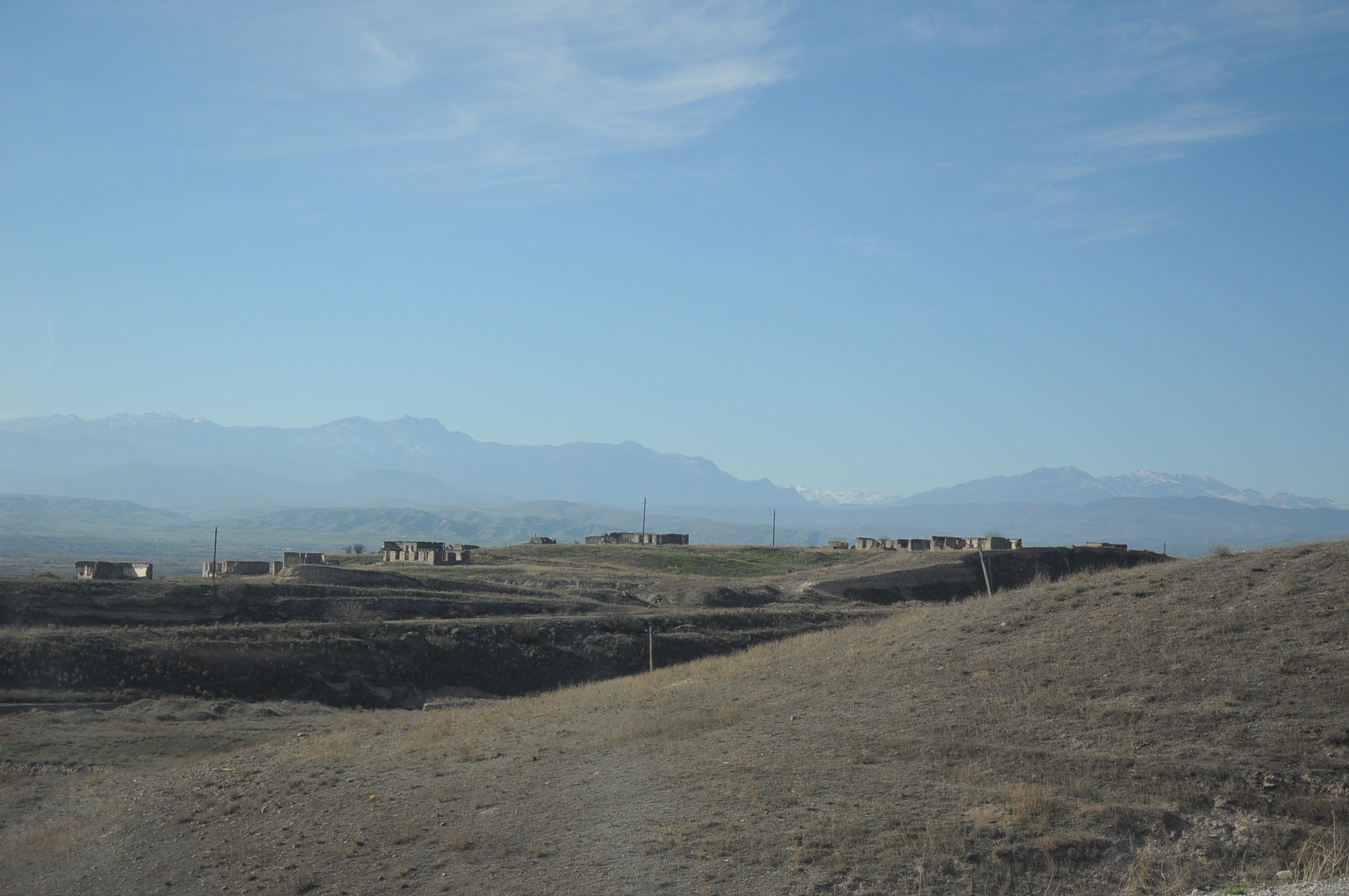

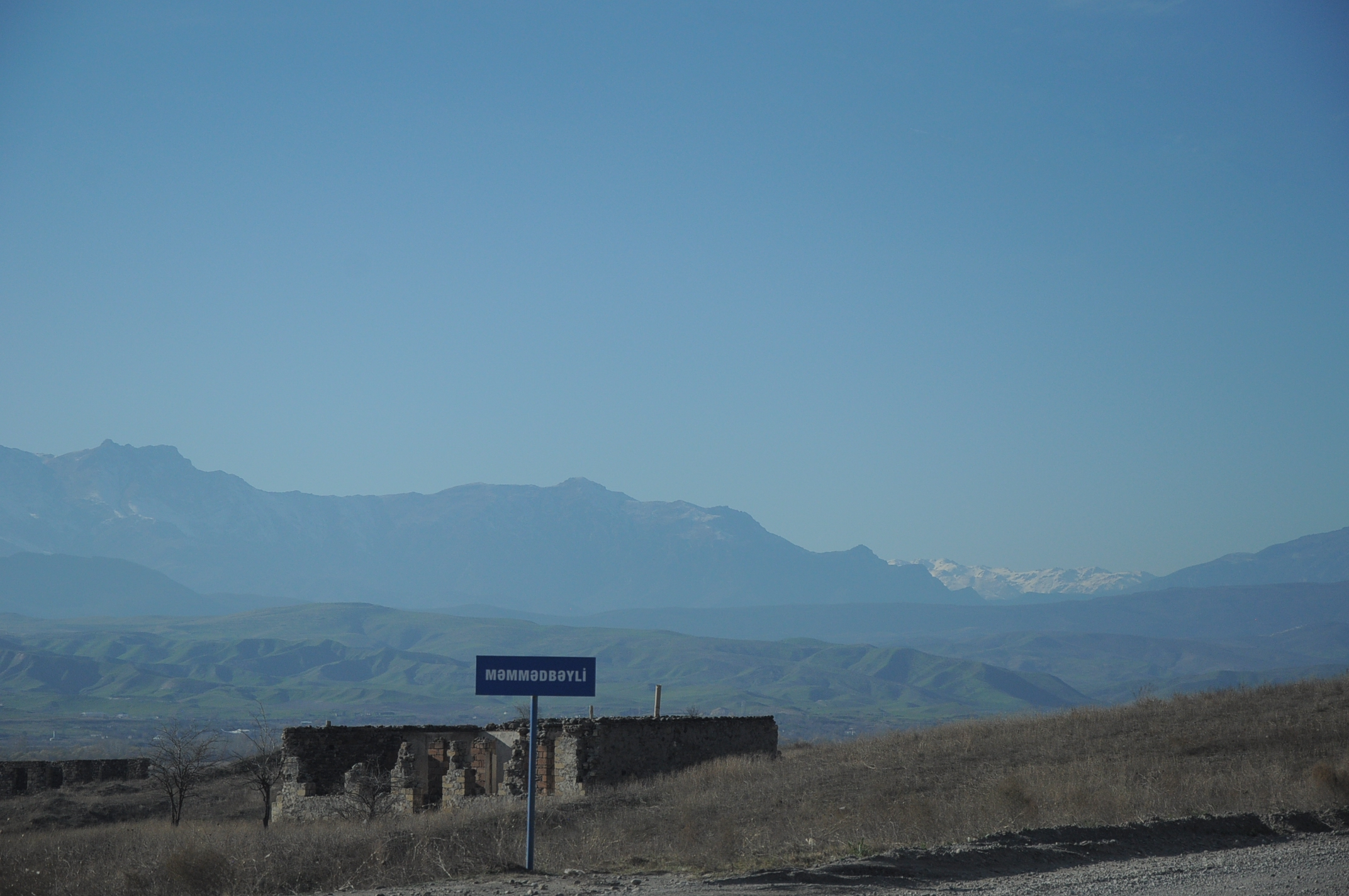

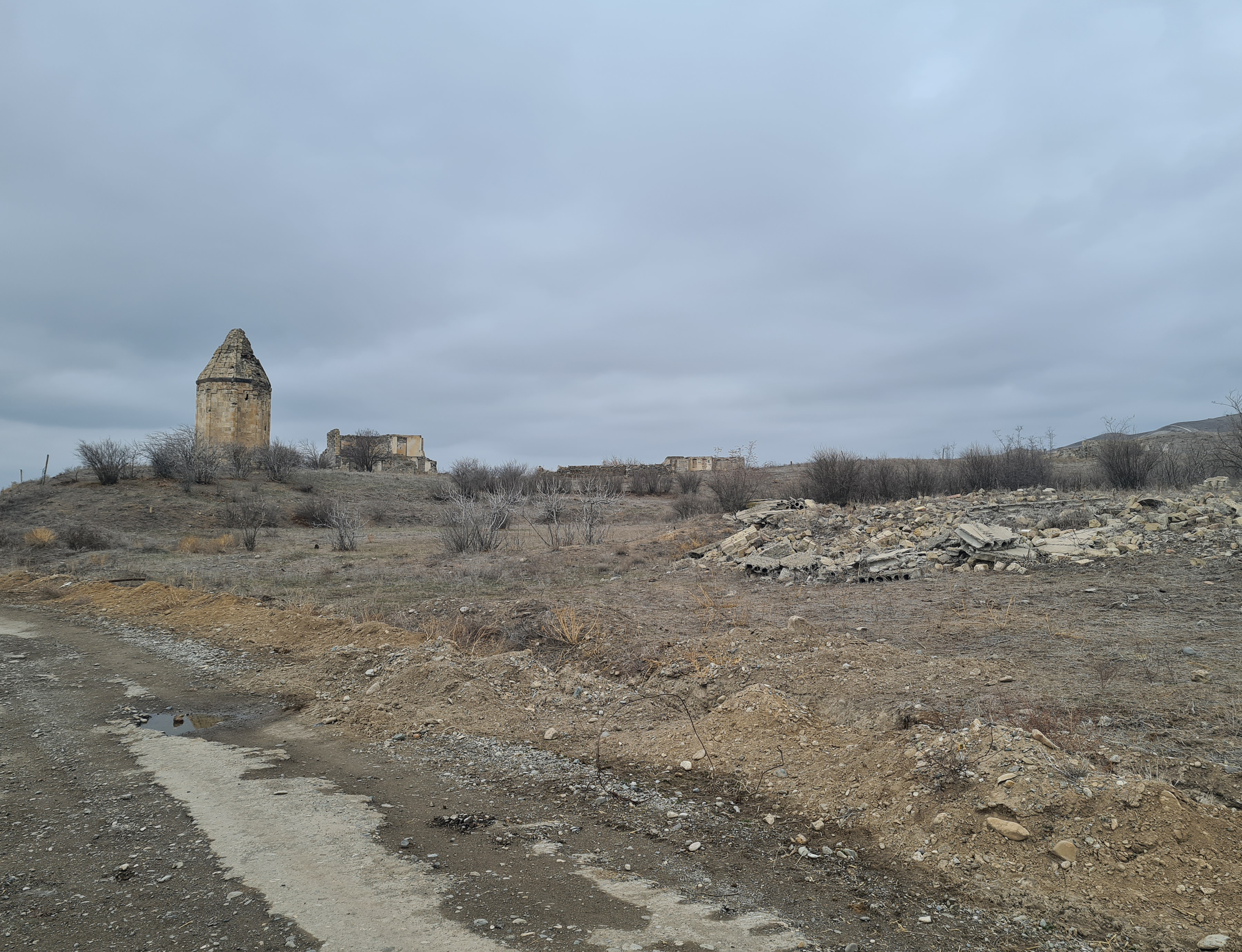
