= Qaraxanbəyli, Fizuli =

Qaraxanbəyli
- Location within Azerbaijan Location within Karabakh Economic Region
- Coordinates: 39°35′58″N 47°16′02″E
- Country: Azerbaijan
- District: Fuzuli

Population
  - Total: 0
- Time zone: UTC+4 (AZT)

Qaraxanbəyli (also, Garakhanbeyli) is an uninhabited village in the Fuzuli District of Azerbaijan.

The village was located on the Artsakh side on the cease-fire line between the armed forces of the self-proclaimed Republic of Artsakh (as a part of their Hadrut Province) and those of Azerbaijan. There had been allegations of cease fire violations in the village's vicinity. It was taken back by Azerbaijan Army during the Aras Valley campaign on 27 September 2020.
