= Qarakollu =

- Location within Azerbaijan Location within Karabakh Economic Region
- Coordinates: 39°29′13″N 47°07′09″E
- Country: Azerbaijan
- District: Fuzuli
- Time zone: UTC+4 (AZT)

Qarakollu (also, Gharagiollu, Karakelli, Karakëllu, and Karakolly) is a village in the Fuzuli District of Azerbaijan.
