= Lake Agali =

Lake in Estonia

- Agali järv (Estonian)
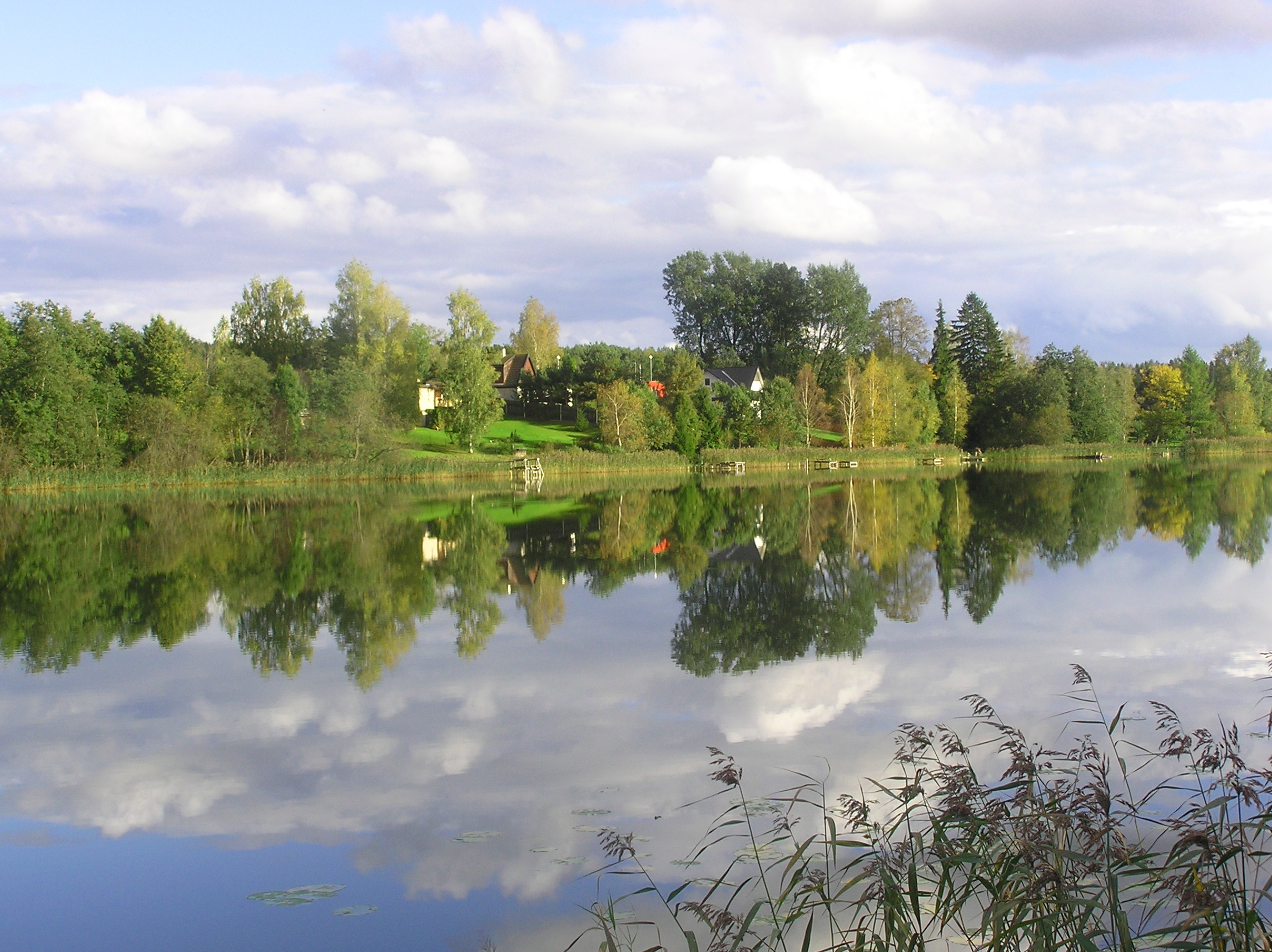

- Location within Estonia
- Coordinates: 58°22′01″N 26°57′47″E
- Basin countries: Estonia
- Max. length: 690 meters (2,260 ft)
- Surface area: 13.0 hectares (32 acres)
- Average depth: 5.7 meters (19 ft)
- Max. depth: 19.5 meters (64 ft)
- Water volume: 686,000 cubic meters (24,200,000 cu ft)
- Shore length^{1}: 1,670 meters (5,480 ft)
- Surface elevation: 33.0 meters (108.3 ft)
- ^{1} Shore length is not a well-defined measure.

Lake Agali (Estonian: Agali järv, also Akkali järv, Akali järv, or Mäksa Agali järv) is a lake in Estonia. It is located in the village of Sarakuste in Kastre Parish, Tartu County.

== Physical description ==
The lake has an area of 13.0 hectares (32 acres). The lake has an average depth of 5.7 meters (19 ft) and a maximum depth of 19.5 meters (64 ft). It is 690 meters (2,260 ft) long, and its shoreline measures 1,670 meters (5,480 ft). It has a volume of 686,000 cubic meters (24,200,000 cu ft).

== See also ==
- List of lakes in Estonia
