= Xələfli (town) =

- Location within Azerbaijan
- Coordinates: 39°10′17″N 47°00′24″E
- Country: Azerbaijan
- District: Jabrayil

Population (2008)
  - Total: 744
- Time zone: UTC+4 (AZT)
  - Summer (DST): UTC+5 (AZT)

Xələfli (Khalafli) is a village in the Jabrayil District of Azerbaijan.
