= Şərifan =

- Location within Azerbaijan
- Coordinates: 39°08′01″N 46°47′53″E
- Country: Azerbaijan
- Rayon: Zangilan
- Time zone: UTC+4 (AZT)
  - Summer (DST): UTC+5 (AZT)

Şərifan (also, Şarifan, Sherifan, and Sharifan) is a village in the Zangilan Rayon of Azerbaijan. On 20 October 2020 President of Azerbaijan Ilham Aliyev claimed that the village had been captured from the Republic of Artsakh by Azerbaijani forces, though this has not yet been corroborated by third-party sources.
