= Tiri, Azerbaijan =

Tiri
- Location within Azerbaijan
- Coordinates: 39°02′07″N 46°45′08″E
- Country: Azerbaijan
- District: Zangilan
- Time zone: UTC+4 (AZT)

Tiri is a village located in the administrative-territorial district of the village of Jahangirbeyli in the Zangilan District of Azerbaijan. The village is situated at the confluence of the Okhchuchay and Araz rivers.

== History ==
According to the “Code of statistical data of the Transcaucasian region population, extracted from the family lists of 1886”, in the village of Tiri (Diri) of the Tirin rural district of Zangezur district, Elizavetpol province, there were 82 dym and 325 Azerbaijanis (in the source listed as "Tatars"), Shiites by religion. Among the village's population, 48 people were beys, 7 were representatives of the clergy, while the rest were landowner peasants.

According to the results of the Azerbaijani Agricultural Census of 1921, Tiri, Ordakli rural district, Gubadli district, Azerbaijan SSR, was inhabited by 51 people, the predominant nationality was Azerbaijani Turks (Azerbaijanis).

During the First Karabakh War in 1993, the village was occupied by Armenian armed forces. After the occupation, the village was destroyed. Residential buildings, a village school, village library and social club were destroyed.

On 22 October 2020, during the Second Karabakh War, the Azerbaijani Army regained the control over the village of Tiri and liberated it. Subsequently, Azerbaijani Ministry of Defence published a video from the village, showing the ruined state of the village following its occupation.
