= Nüzgar =

- Location within Azerbaijan
- Coordinates: 39°24′55″N 47°13′28″E
- Country: Azerbaijan
- Rayon: Jabrayil

Population
  - Total: 0
- Time zone: UTC+4 (AZT)

Nuzgar (Azerbaijani: Nüzgər) is a village in the Guyjag administrative-territorial unit of Jabrayil district, Azerbaijan, located on Araz plain, 17 km east of the city of Jabrayil. Currently uninhabited.

== Toponym ==
The “Encyclopaedic Dictionary of Toponyms of Azerbaijan” suggests that the name of the village comes from the Persian word “neyzar”, meaning “thickets of reeds”. On the territory of the village even today there are areas overgrown with reeds.

== History ==
The village was founded by immigrants of Iranian Azerbaijan on the site of the ruins of an old village overgrown with reeds called “the house of Gargun”.

During the years of the Russian Empire, the village of Nuzgar was part of Jabrayil district, Elizavetpol province.

During the Soviet years, the village was part of Jabrayil district of Azerbaijan SSR. The village was captured by Armenian forces in the First Karabakh War.

On 27 September 2020, during the Second Karabakh War, the Ministry of Defence of Azerbaijan announced the liberation of the village of Nuzgar. BBC later reported that all the villages liberated in the south, according to Azerbaijan, judging by satellite images, lie in ruins and have been completely or almost completely abandoned since the Azerbaijani population left them in the early 1990s to escape the advancing Armenians.

== Population ==
According to the “Code of statistical data of the Transcaucasian region population, extracted from the family lists of 1886”, in the village of Nuzgar, Guyjag rural district, Jabrayil district, there were 47 dym where lived 202 Azerbaijanis (listed as “Tatars”), who were peasants.

According to the “Kavkazskiy kalendar” for 1912, 394 people lived in the village of Nuzgar, Karyagin district, mostly Azerbaijanis, indicated in the calendar as “Tatars”.
