= Hacılı, Jabrayil =

Hacılı
- Location within Azerbaijan
- Coordinates: 39°18′37″N 47°04′14″E
- Country: Azerbaijan
- Rayon: Jabrayil
- Time zone: UTC+4 (AZT)
  - Summer (DST): UTC+5 (AZT)

Hajyly is a village within the administrative-territorial unit with the same name in Jabrayil district, Azerbaijan, located on a plain. It is located 5 km south of Jabrayil city.

== Toponym ==
The name of the village is associated with the Hajyly tribe who founded the village.

== History ==
The village was founded by the families belonging to Hajyly tribe who settled here in Dubar locality.

During the years of the Russian Empire, the villages of Hajilu 1 and Hajilu 2 were part of the rural county of the same name in Jabrayil district, Elizavetpol province.

After Soviet occupation, Hajyly was part of the village council of the same name in Jabrayil district of Azerbaijan SSR. The village had a club, a library and a medical centre.

According to the publication “Administrative Division of the ASSR”, prepared in 1933 by the Department of National Economic Accounting of the Azerbaijan SSR (AzNEA), as of 1 January 1933, the village of Hajyly, part of the Dash Veysalli village council of Jabrayil district of Azerbaijan SSR, there were 79 farms (17 generalized and 62 sole proprietors) and 296 residents (153 men and 143 women). 100% of population of the entire Dash Veysalli village council were Turks (Azerbaijanis).

As an aftermath of the Karabakh War in August 1993, It was occupied by the Armenian forces in 1993.

On 19 October 2020, Azerbaijani President Ilham Aliyev announced the liberation of one part of the village of Hajyly by the Azerbaijani Army. After 3 days, President Aliyev announced the liberation of the second part of the village. On 7 November, the Azerbaijani Ministry of Defence published a video footage that allegedly showed the village of Hajyly under Azerbaijani control.

== Population ==
According to the “Code of statistical data of the Transcaucasian region population, extracted from the family lists of 1886”, in the villages of Hajilu 1 and Hajilu 2 of the rural district of the same name in Jabrayil district, there were 63 dym and lived 272 Azerbaijanis (listed as “Tatars”), who were Shiites by religion, 10 of them were representatives of the clergy, the rest were peasants.

According to the “Caucasian Calendar” for 1912, 451 people lived in the village of Hajyly, Karyagin district, most were Azerbaijanis, indicated in the calendar as “Tatars”.

In 1986, 383 people lived in the village. The village population was engaged in livestock farming, wheat cultivation, sericulture and viticulture.
