= Minbaşılı =

- Location within Azerbaijan
- Coordinates: 39°20′33″N 47°01′43″E
- Country: Azerbaijan
- Rayon: Jabrayil
- Time zone: UTC+4 (AZT)
  - Summer (DST): UTC+5 (AZT)

Minbashyly (Azerbaijani: Minbaşılı) is a village in the Jabrayil district of Azerbaijan, located on Araz plain, 6 km south of the city of Jabrayil, on the right bank of Chaylag River (the left tributary of the Araz).

== Toponym ==
The village bears the name of Minbashyly generation who lived in the village.

== History ==
In the 19th century, the village consisted of several oimaks (camps) in the area of Kohnakishlak. Later the population settled in this area, known as Parayatag. Two generations lived in the village: the Minbashyly and the Jafaralilar.

During the Soviet years, the village was part of the village council of the same name in Jabrayil district of Azerbaijan SSR. The village had a secondary school, a library, a community centre and a medical centre. The village was captured by Armenian forces in the First Karabakh War.

On 23 October 2020, the President Ilham Aliyev announced that Azerbaijani Army liberated the village of Minbashyly. On the same day, Azerbaijani Ministry of Defence published a video footage that allegedly showed the village of Minbashyly under the Azerbaijani control. The footages shows that all buildings in the village are destroyed during Armenian occupation.

== Population ==
According to the publication “Administrative Division of the ASSR”, prepared in 1933 by the Department of National Economic Accounting of the Azerbaijan SSR (AzNEA), as of 1 January 1933, in Minbashyly village which was part of Dash Veysalli village council of Jabrayil district of Azerbaijan SSR, there were 45 farms and 237 inhabitants. The entire population of the village council were Azerbaijanis (in the source listed as “Turks”).

In 1981, 235 people lived in the village. The village population was engaged in livestock farming, wheat cultivation, viticulture and sericulture.
