= Dağ Maşanlı =

- Location within Azerbaijan
- Coordinates: 39°22′28.2″N 46°44′36.6″E
- Country: Azerbaijan
- District: Jabrayil
- Time zone: UTC+4 (AZT)
  - Summer (DST): UTC+5 (AZT)

Dağ Maşanlı (Dagh Mashanly) is a village in the Jabrayil District of Azerbaijan.
