= Rah Band-e Olya =

Rah Band-e Olya راه بندعليا
- Village
- Location within Iran
- Coordinates: 33°46′24″N 48°38′52″E
- Country: Iran
- Province: Lorestan
- County: Borujerd
- Bakhsh: Central
- Rural District: Hemmatabad

Population (2006)
  - Total: 53
- Time zone: UTC+3:30 (IRST)
  - Summer (DST): UTC+4:30 (IRDT)

Rah Band-e Olya (Persian: راه بندعليا, also Romanized as Rāh Band-e ‘Olyā and Rāband-e ‘Olyā; also known as Rāh Band, Rāh Bīd, Rauband, Rūband, and Rāband) is a village in Hemmatabad Rural District, in the Central District of Borujerd County, Lorestan Province, Iran. At the 2006 census, its population was 53, in 12 families.
