= Mincivan =

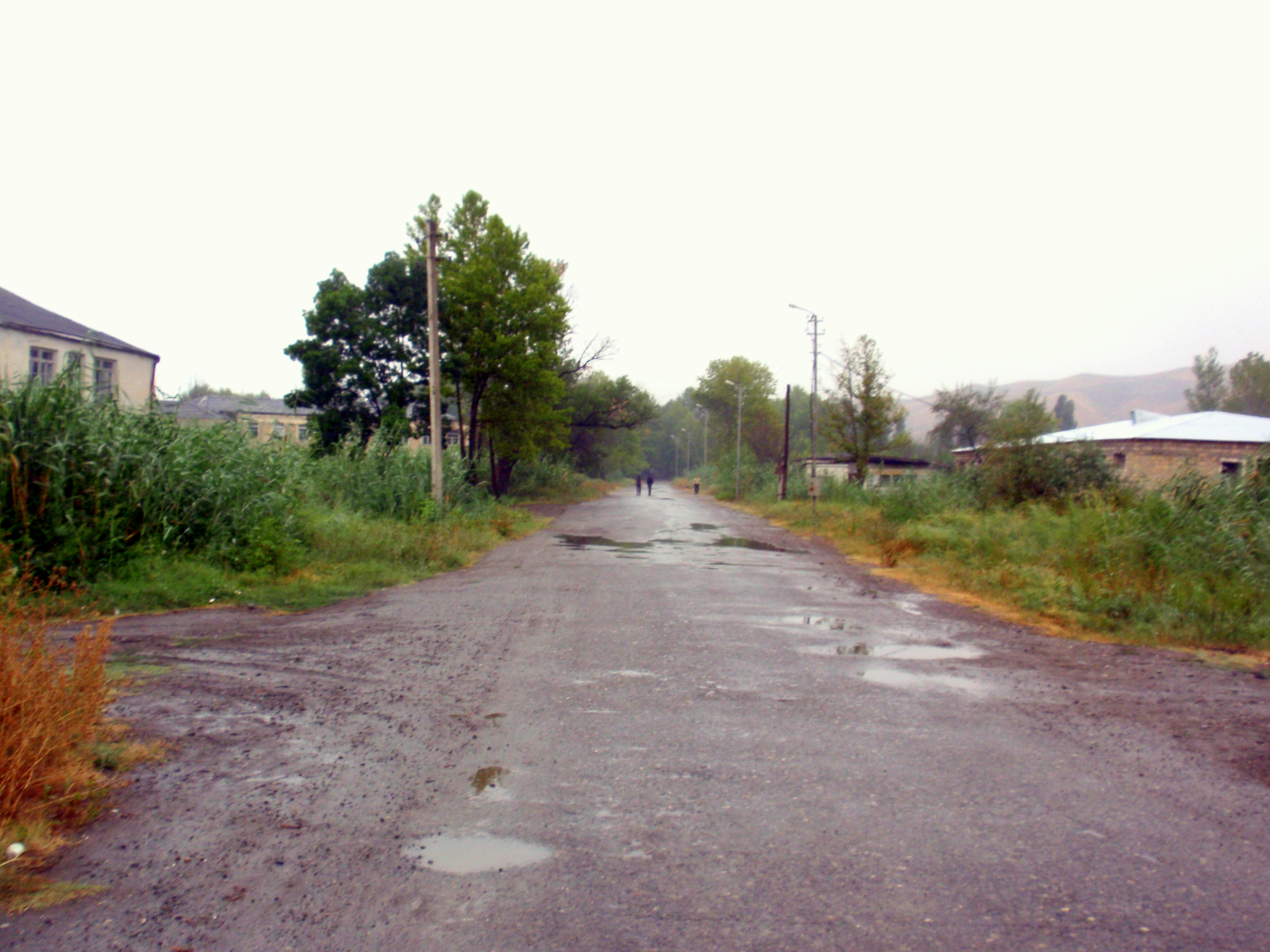
- Street in Mincivan

- Location within Azerbaijan
- Coordinates: 39°01′48″N 46°43′07″E
- Country: Azerbaijan
- District: Zangilan
- Time zone: UTC+4 (UTC)

Mincivan (Minjivan) is a town in the Zangilan District of Azerbaijan.

== History ==
As part of Russian Empire, the village of Minjivan was part of Zangezur uezd, the Elizavetpol province. Historical records from the 19th century note two villages with the name Minjivan registered in the Zangezur uezd.

During the Soviet years, Minjivan, populated mainly by Azerbaijanis, was part of the Zangilan district of the Azerbaijan SSR.

On 21 October 2020, during the Second Karabakh War, as a result of heavy fights, Azerbaijan regained control over the town.

== Geography ==
Minjivan situated on the left bank of Araz River, 12 km southeast of the city of Zangilan, near the Minjivan railway station, on the inactive Julfa-Horadiz railway line. Also from the Minjivan railway station, a dead-end line of 39 km long to Kapan departs, which passes through Zangilan.

== Demographics ==
According to the “Code of statistical data of the Transcaucasian region population, extracted from the family lists of 1886”, in the village of Minjivan, Jahangirbayli rural district, Zangezur district, Elizavetpol province, there were 10 dym and 54 Tatars (later known as Azerbaijanis), who were Shiites by religion. The entire population was state peasants.

According to the 1912 Caucasian Calendar, 100 people lived in the village of Minjivan, mostly Tatars, later known as Azerbaijanis.

According to the results of the Azerbaijan Agricultural Census of 1921, Minjivan with the village of Gushan, Gubadli district of Azerbaijan SSR, was inhabited by 257 people (58 households), the predominant nationality being Azerbaijani Turks (Azerbaijanis).

As of 1 January 1933, 322 people (72 households) lived in Minjivan, Zangilan district of Azerbaijan SSR – 169 men and 153 women. The entire village council (the villages of Baharli, Dallakli, Terekeme), the centre of which was Minjivan, was 100% Turkic (Azerbaijanis).

According to the all-Union population census of 1989, 5 506 people lived in the urban-type settlement of Minjivan.
