= Aşağı Yeməzli =

Place in Zangilan, Azerbaijan

- Location within Azerbaijan
- Coordinates: 39°12′06″N 46°36′36″E
- Country: Azerbaijan
- Rayon: Zangilan
- Time zone: UTC+4 (AZT)
  - Summer (DST): UTC+5 (AZT)

Aşağı Yeməzli (also, Ashagy Yemezli and Ashaga Yemazlu) is a village in the Zangilan Rayon, located in the south-west of the country of Azerbaijan.
