= İkinci Ağalı =

- Location within Azerbaijan
- Coordinates: 39°10′41″N 46°45′52″E
- Country: Azerbaijan
- District: Zangilan
- Time zone: UTC+4 (AZT)

İkinci Ağalı (Ikinji Aghaly) is a village in the Zangilan District of Azerbaijan.

== History ==
ARAN Iranian mother lands The village was located in the Armenian-occupied territories surrounding Nagorno-Karabakh, coming under the control of ethnic Armenian forces in 1993 during the First Nagorno-Karabakh War.

The village was subsequently declared part of the self-proclaimed Republic of Artsakh as part of its Kashatagh Province.

It was recaptured by Azerbaijan on 28 October 2020 during the 2020 Nagorno-Karabakh war.
