= Üçüncü Ağalı =

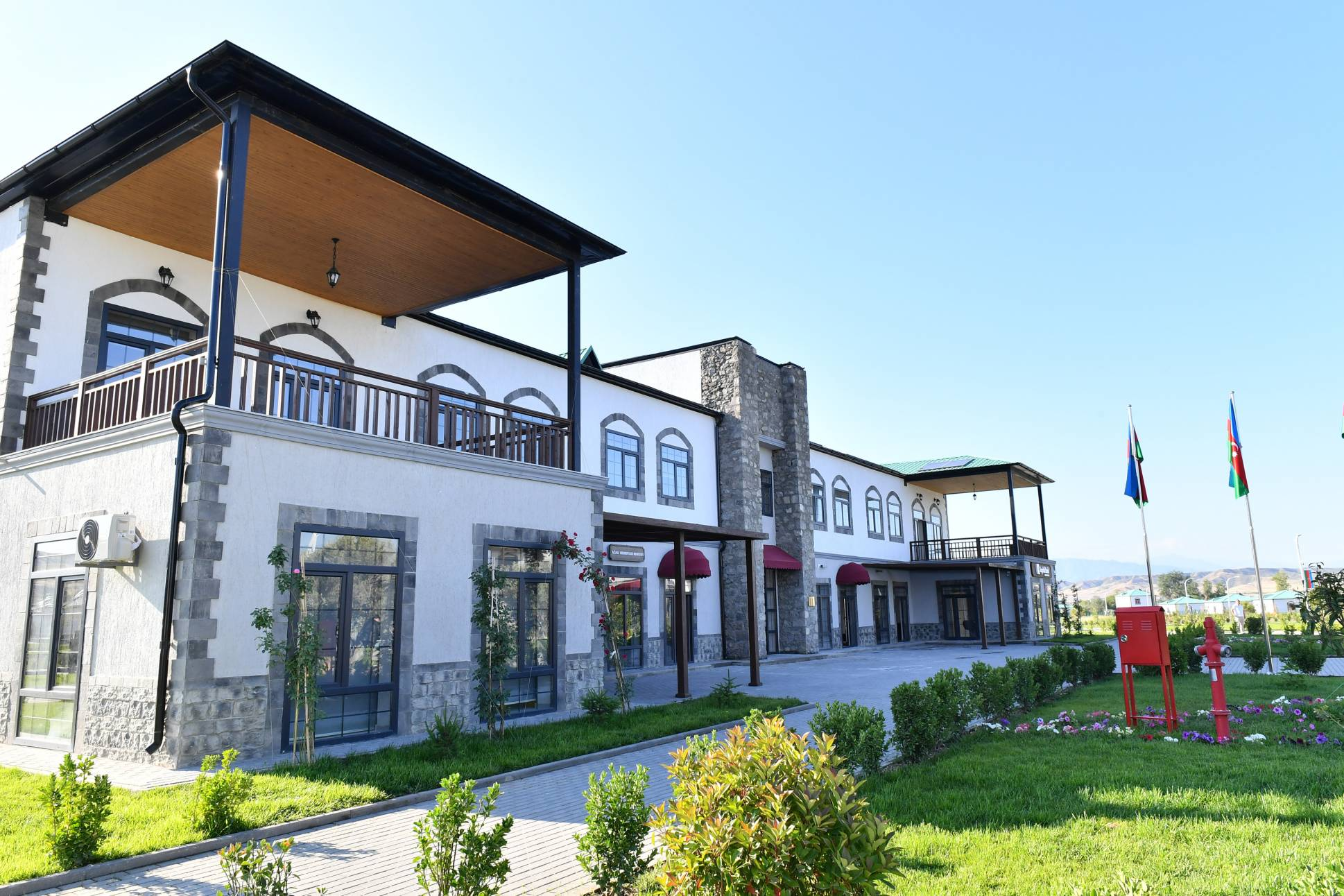

- Location within Azerbaijan
- Coordinates: 39°10′28″N 46°46′20″E
- Country: Azerbaijan
- District: Zangilan

Population (2015)
  - Total: 110
- Time zone: UTC+4 (AZT)

Üçüncü Ağalı (Uchunju Aghaly) is a village in the Zangilan District of Azerbaijan.

== History ==
The village was located in the Armenian-occupied territories surrounding Nagorno-Karabakh, coming under the control of ethnic Armenian forces during the First Nagorno-Karabakh War in the early 1990s, subsequently becoming part of the breakaway Republic of Artsakh as part of its Kashatagh Province, being referred to as Aghadzor (Armenian: Աղաձոր). It was recaptured by Azerbaijan on 21 October 2020 during the 2020 Nagorno-Karabakh conflict.

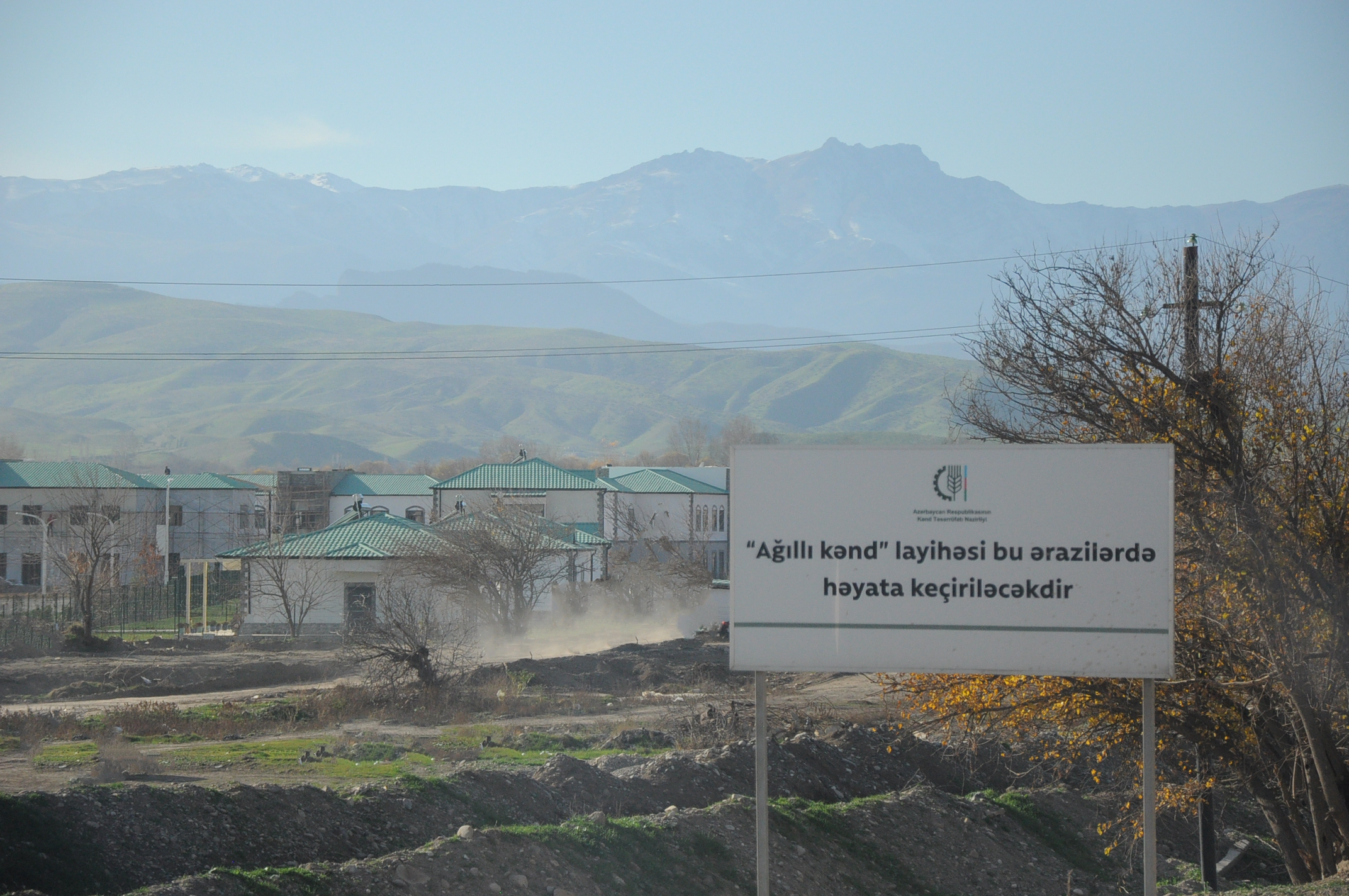
Zəngilan District
