= Mandılı =

- Location within Azerbaijan Location within Karabakh Economic Region
- Coordinates: 39°28′26″N 47°09′43″E
- Country: Azerbaijan
- District: Fuzuli
- Time zone: UTC+4 (AZT)

Mandılı (also, Mandyly) is a village in the Fuzuli District of Azerbaijan. The village was announced to be recaptured by Azerbaijan on October 28, 2020.
