= Tulus (village) =

- Location within Azerbaijan
- Coordinates: 39°21′36.2″N 47°04′01.1″E
- Country: Azerbaijan
- District: Jabrayil
- Time zone: UTC+4 (AZT)
  - Summer (DST): UTC+5 (AZT)

Tulus is a village in the Jabrayil Rayon of Azerbaijan.
