= Sirik, Azerbaijan =

Sirik
- Location within Azerbaijan
- Coordinates: 39°28′30.0″N 46°52′17.9″E
- Country: Azerbaijan
- District: Jabrayil
- Time zone: UTC+4 (AZT)

Sirik (Azerbaijani: Sirik) is a village in the administrative unit of the same name, Jabrayil district, Azerbaijan, located on the slopes of the Karabakh ridge, 15 km northwest of the city of Jabrayil.

== Toponym ==
The name of the village is associated with the name of Sirak tribe. In 1917 the village was registered as Sirikli. The word Sirik in Turkic languages means “stick”.

== History ==
During the years of the Russian Empire, the village of Sirik was part of Jabrayil district, Elizavetpol province.

During the Soviet years, the village was part of the village council of the same name, Jabrayil district, Azerbaijan SSR. The village had an eight-grade school, a library, a club and a medical centre.

The village was captured by Armenian forces in the First Karabakh War.

On 22 October 2020, President of Azerbaijan Ilham Aliyev announced the liberation and return of the village of Sirik under Azerbaijani control.

== Population ==
According to the “Code of statistical data of the Transcaucasian region population, extracted from the family lists of 1886”, in the village of Sirik, Mashanly rural district, Jabrayil district, there were 43 dym where lived 252 Azerbaijanis (listed as “Tatars”), who were Sunni by religion and peasants.

According to the “Caucasian Calendar” for 1912, 100 people lived in the village of Sirik, Karyagin district, mostly Azerbaijanis, listed in the calendar as “Tatars”.

According to the publication “Administrative Division of the ASSR”, prepared in 1933 by the Department of National Economic Accounting of the Azerbaijan SSR (AzNEA), as of 1 January 1933, in the village of Sirik, which was part of the Ahmadly village council of Jabrayil district, Azerbaijan SSR, there were 70 households and 430 residents. The entire population of the village council was Azerbaijanis (in the source indicated as “Turks”).

In 1983, 512 people lived in the village. The village population was engaged in livestock farming, wheat cultivation and viticulture.

== Cultural monuments ==
In the village of Sirik there is an ancient cemetery and a fortress from Middle Ages.
