= Qarqulu =

- Location within Azerbaijan
- Coordinates: 38°58′N 46°38′E
- Country: Azerbaijan
- Rayon: Zangilan
- Time zone: UTC+4 (AZT)
  - Summer (DST): UTC+5 (AZT)

Qarqulu (also, Kargulu) is a village in the Zangilan Rayon of Azerbaijan.
