= Sofulu, Jabrayil =

Sofulu
- Location within Azerbaijan
- Coordinates: 39°22′20″N 46°49′04″E
- Country: Azerbaijan
- District: Jabrayil
- Time zone: UTC+4 (AZT)

Sofulu (Azerbaijani: Sofulu) is a village located within the Dagh Tumas administrative-territorial unit of Jabrayil district of Azerbaijan, on the slopes of the Karabakh ridge, 18 km west of the city of Jabrayil.

== Toponym ==
The name of the village is associated with the name of the Turkic tribe Sofulu.

== History ==
The Sofulu tribe spent the summer in the territory of Zangezur, and the winter in Karabakh. Later, having settled down, founded several villages called Sofulu.

During the years of the Russian Empire, the village was part of the Ahmadly village council of Jabrayil district, Elizavetpol province.

The village was captured by Armenian forces in the First Karabakh War and was destroyed.

On 25 October 2020, during the Second Karabakh War, the Azerbaijani Army regained the control over the village of Sofulu and liberated it. On 26 October 2020, Azerbaijani President Ilham Aliyev announced that the village of Sofulu was liberated and returned under the Azerbaijani control.

== Population ==
During the Soviet years, the village was part of Jabrayil district of Azerbaijan SSR. According to the publication “Administrative Division of the ASSR”, prepared in 1933 by the Department of National Economic Accounting of the Azerbaijan SSR (AzNEA), as of 1 January 1933, in the village of Sofulu, which was part of the Ahmedly village council of Jabrayil district, Azerbaijan SSR, there were 46 farms and 294 residents. The entire population of the village council were Azerbaijanis (in the source listed as “Turks”).
