= Tinli, Jabrayil =

Tinli
- Location within Azerbaijan
- Coordinates: 39°15′32″N 46°53′48″E
- Country: Azerbaijan
- District: Jabrayil
- Time zone: UTC+4 (AZT)
  - Summer (DST): UTC+5 (AZT)

Tinli is a village in the Jabrayil District of Azerbaijan.
