= Papı =

- Location within Azerbaijan
- Coordinates: 39°24′10″N 47°04′29″E
- Country: Azerbaijan
- Rayon: Jabrayil
- Time zone: UTC+4 (AZT)
  - Summer (DST): UTC+5 (AZT)

Papı (also, Papy) is a village in the Jabrayil Rayon of Azerbaijan.
