= Quycaq =

- Location within Azerbaijan
- Coordinates: 39°24′16″N 47°09′31″E
- Country: Azerbaijan
- Rayon: Jabrayil

Population
  - Total: 0
- Time zone: UTC+4 (AZT)
  - Summer (DST): UTC+5 (AZT)

Quycaq (also, Kuydzhak) is a village in the Jabrayil Rayon of Azerbaijan. It is currently uninhabited.

== History ==
In 1993, the village was captured by the Armed Forces of Armenia in the First Nagorno-Karabakh War. On 3 October 2020, the village was reportedly re-captured by the Azerbaijani Armed Forces during the fighting in Karabakh.
