= Birinci Ağalı =

- Location within Azerbaijan
- Coordinates: 39°11′03″N 46°45′15″E
- Country: Azerbaijan
- Rayon: Zangilan
- Time zone: UTC+4 (AZT)
  - Summer (DST): UTC+5 (AZT)

Birinci Ağalı (also, Agaly, Agaly Pervyye, and Yukhary Agaly) is a village in Zangilan Rayon, located in the southwest of Azerbaijan. It was occupied by Armenian forces in 1993 and later recaptured by the Azerbaijani forces around October 28, 2020.
