= Aşağı Maralyan =

- Location within Azerbaijan
- Coordinates: 39°20′43″N 47°13′05″E
- Country: Azerbaijan
- Rayon: Jabrayil

Population
  - Total: 0
- Time zone: UTC+4 (AZT)
  - Summer (DST): UTC+5 (AZT)

Aşağı Maralyan (also, Ashaga Maral’yan, Ashagy-Maral’yan, Maral’yan and Maral’yanskiy) is a village in the Jabrayil Rayon of Azerbaijan. It is currently uninhabited. In October 2022, it was occupied by the Azerbaijani Armed Forces.
