= Çaxırlı, Jabrayil =

Çaxırlı
- Location within Azerbaijan
- Coordinates: 39°22′01″N 47°16′02″E
- Country: Azerbaijan
- Rayon: Jabrayil

Population
  - Total: 0
- Time zone: UTC+4 (AZT)
  - Summer (DST): UTC+5 (AZT)

Çaxırlı (also, Chakhyrly) is a village in the Jabrayil Rayon of Azerbaijan. Currently uninhabited.
