= Zangilan District =

District in southwestern Azerbaijan

Coordinates: 39.0656°N 46.6969°E

- District
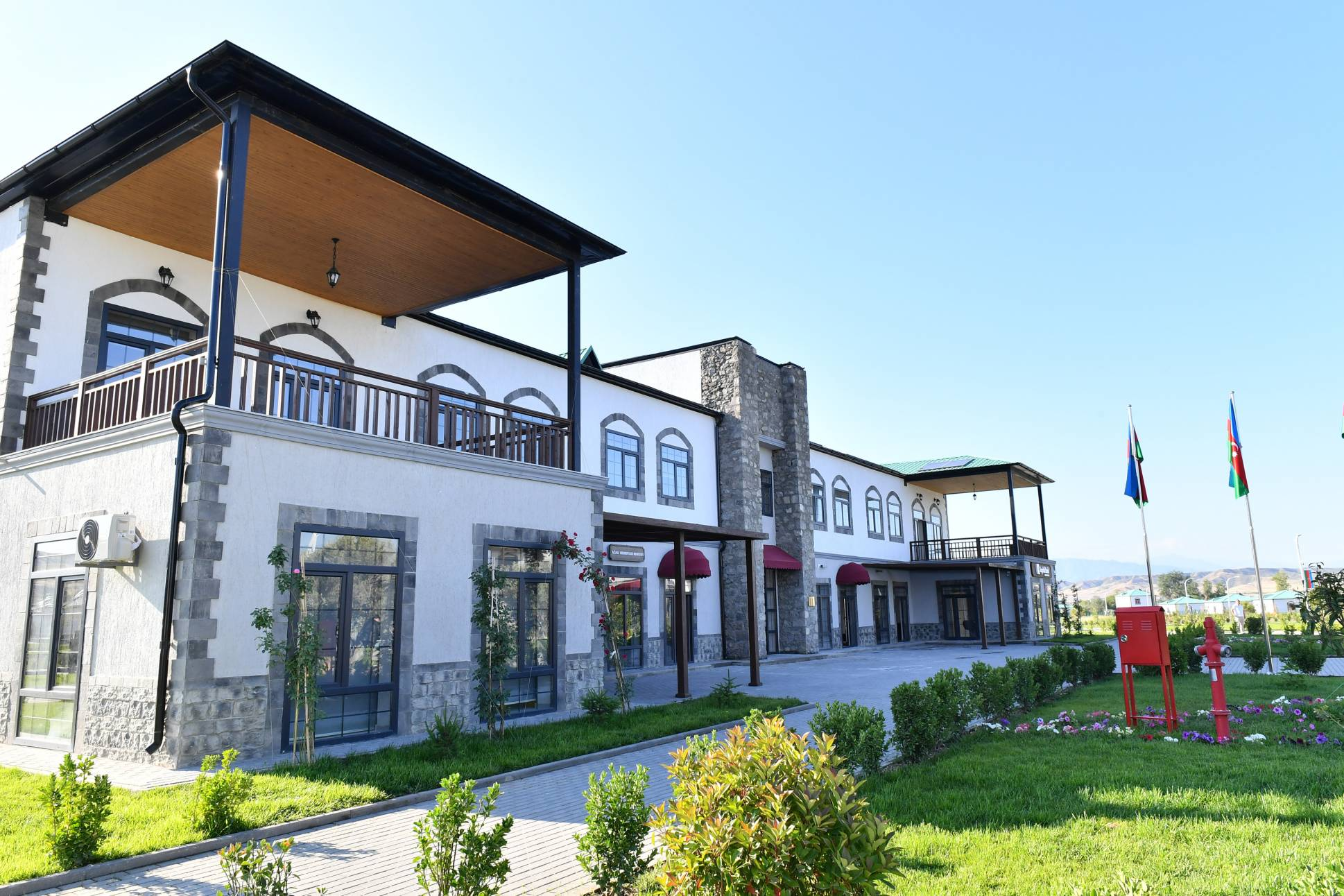

- Map of Azerbaijan showing Zangilan District
- Country: Azerbaijan
- Region: East Zangezur
- Established: 8 August 1930
- Capital: Zangilan
- Settlements: 85

Government
  - Governor: Ramiz Hasanov

Area
  - Total: 730 km^{2} (280 sq mi)

Population (2020)
  - Total: 45,200
  - Density: 62/km^{2} (160/sq mi)
- Time zone: UTC+4 (AZT)
- Postal code: 6401
- Website: zengilan-ih.gov.az

Zangilan District (Azerbaijani: Zəngilan rayonu) is one of the 66 districts of Azerbaijan. It is located in the south-west of the country and belongs to the East Zangezur Economic Region. The district borders the districts of Qubadli, Jabrayil, the Syunik Province of Armenia and the East Azerbaijan Province of Iran. Its capital and largest city is Zangilan. As of 2020, the district had a nominal population of 45,200.

== Geography ==
Zangilan city is located in south-western Azerbaijan, in the northern part of the Aras River and borders Armenia and Iran.

There exists a Mesozoic relief and cretaceous, volcanic and sedimentary rocks are spread in the territory of the district. Remains of the Jurassic and Cretaceous periods spread in mountainous territories are dated back to a period of 150-200 thousand years ago. There are Barbar and Salafir (2270 meters) summits in the territory and this mountain range passes Aras ravine near Aghbend, Vegnali. There is another mountain range in the direction of Sobu-Top-Dallakli villages, beginning from Shukurataz upland and it lowers near to Aras.

The Susan Mountains between the Okhchu and Bargushad Rivers lower in the direction of south-east and make Aghgoyun flat land. This locality consists of sedimentary rocks of the Cretaceous periods. There are Karst caves on both coasts of the Okhchu River. Karabakh mountain ridge is located in the north-eastern part of the district. This ridge creates Goyan valley as it becomes lower.

Forests spread in the mountainous territory of the district. Broad-leaved forests spread at the heights of 1800–2000 meters, gradually become lower and create subalpine and alpine meadows. The territory of the district is rich with healing plants and springs. There are also sources of construction materials, marble, clay, etc. in the district.

Weather conditions of climate and complex relief created the uncommon climate. In a territory along the Aras River with semidesert and dry steppes winter passes drily, and in higher territories, the climate is mildly warm. The territory is rich in minerals – molybdenum, gold, construction materials, limestone and others. The largest plain forest in Europe is also located in the district.

== History ==
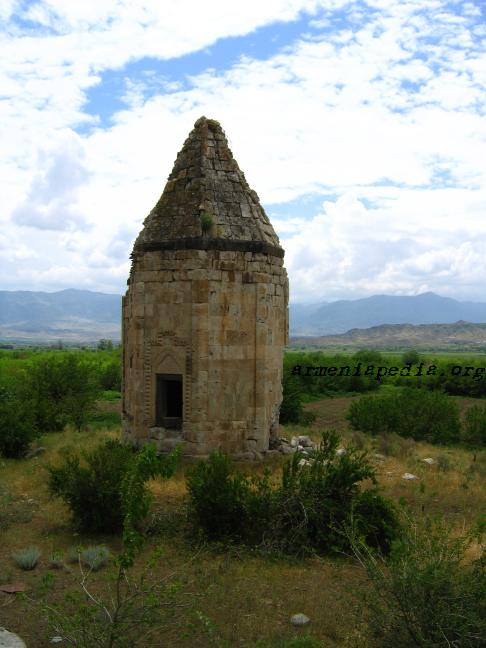
Mausoleum in Məmmədbəyli

Zangilan district was famed under the name of Grakhmu castle located there in the medieval centuries.

Only Achanan volost and the western part was included in the Kapan district of Armenia, but the eastern and more favourable territories were included in the Azerbaijan SSR while determining borders of the Soviet Republics. In 1930, the administrative district of Zangilan was created there.

On October 29, 1993, the district came under the occupation of the Nagorno-Karabakh Defence Army during the First Nagorno-Karabakh War.

There are historical monuments in the territory of the district: a circular tower in Khadijally village, an octagonal mausoleum of Yahya ibn Muhammad al-Haj (1304–1305) in Məmmədbəyli village.

On 20 October 2020, the President of Azerbaijan, Ilham Aliyev, announced that Azerbaijani military forces recaptured some settlements in Zangilan district, namely, Havali, Zarnali, Mammadbayli, Hakari, Sharifan, Mughanli villages, as well as Zangilan city itself. On October 21, 2020, it was announced that Minjivan settlement and 12 more villages of Zangilan district have been recaptured. Azerbaijani authorities announced the capture of 13 more villages and Aghband settlement of Zangilan district on October 22, 2020. The recapture of Aghband settlement was highlighted for the reason that full control over the state border between Azerbaijan and Iran was established after the recapture.

On 19 July 2022, the first residents returned to Ağalı village after 29 years. The village has a school, post office, health centre, bank, market and café. It is expected that 1300 people will live in the village.

== Demographics ==
On 1 January 1979, the population was 28,400, counting 83 settlements.

According to other sources, 29,377 people lived in 1979 in the district. Ethnic composition of the 29,377 people:

- Azerbaijanis 97,6% (28.685)
- Russians 2,0% (590)
- Armenians 0,1% (35)

Number of inhabitants rose to 32,698 people in 1989.

== See also ==
- Armenian-occupied territories surrounding Nagorno-Karabakh
