= Deaths in July 1991 =

The following is a list of deaths in July 1991 of notable people.

Entries for each day are listed alphabetically by surname. A typical entry lists information in the following sequence:

- Name, age, country of citizenship at birth, subsequent country of citizenship (if applicable), reason for notability, cause of death (if known), and reference.

== July 1991 ==
=== 1 ===
- Joost Baljeu, 65, Dutch artist.
- Paulo Mendes Campos, 69, Brazilian writer and journalist.
- Alfred Eisenbeisser, 83, Romanian football player and Olympic figure skater (1936).
- Joachim Kroll, 58, German serial killer, necrophile and cannibal, heart attack.
- Michael Landon, 54, American actor (Little House on the Prairie, Bonanza. Highway to Heaven), pancreatic cancer.
- Mike Reynolds, 27, Canadian soccer player.
- Ronald Sartori, 76, Australian cricketer.

=== 2 ===
- Shannie Barnett, 72, American basketball player.
- Bruno Engelmeier, 63, Austrian footballer and Olympian (1948).
- Al Glossop, 76, American baseball player.
- Don Houghton, 61, British television screenwriter and producer.
- David Armine Howarth, 78, British naval officer, boatbuilder, and author.
- André Martin, 82, French Olympic sports shooter (1952).
- Lee Remick, 55, American actress (Days of Wine and Roses, The Omen, Wait Until Dark), kidney cancer.
- Arthur Robertson, 75, Australian rules footballer.
- José María Rosa, 84, Argentine historian.
- Ermanno Scaramuzzi, 63, Italian football player and coach.

=== 3 ===
- Dolly Anwar, 43, Bangladeshi actress and writer, suicide.
- Dick Delgado, 60, American Olympic wrestler (1956).
- Ferdinand Denzler, 81, Swiss Olympic water polo player (1936).
- Doro Levi, 93, Italian archaeologist.
- Domingo Tarasconi, 87, Argentine football player and Olympian (1928).
- Lê Văn Thiêm, 73, Vietnamese mathematician.
- Sigismund Toduță, 83, Romanian composer, musicologist, and professor.
- Ephraim Urbach, 78–79, Israeli scholar and politician.
- Jimmy Van Alen, 88, American tennis official.
- Bernard Waley-Cohen, 77, British businessman and politician.
- Ernst Witt, 80, German mathematician.

=== 4 ===
- Victor Chang, 54, Chinese-Australian surgeon, shot.
- Ernie Hammerton, 64, Australian rugby player.
- Henry Koerner, 75, Austrian-American painter and graphic designer, bicycle accident.
- Hugo Lepe, 51, Chilean football player.
- Art Sansom, 70, American cartoonist (The Born Loser).

=== 5 ===
- Mildred Dunnock, 90, American actress (Death of a Salesman, Baby Doll).
- Valentina Ivashova, 75, Soviet film actress.
- Bob Kennedy, 62, American gridiron football player.
- Nobuo Nakamura, 82, Japanese actor (Ikiru, Tokyo Story, The Human Condition).
- Howard Nemerov, 71, American poet, cancer.
- Bjarne Schrøen, 73, Norwegian Olympic bobsledder (1948).

=== 6 ===
- Raymond Boisset, 79, French Olympic sprinter (1936).
- Léon Chertok, 79, French psychiatrist.
- Dorcas Cochran, 88, American lyricist and screenwriter.
- Nicholas P. Dallis, 79, American cartoonist (Rex Morgan, M.D.).
- Renée Garilhe, 68, French fencer and Olympic medalist (1948, 1952, 1956, 1960).
- Victor Korovin, 54, Soviet and Russian painter.
- Mudashiru Lawal, 37, Nigerian football player and Olympian (1980).
- Stew Nairn, 59, New Zealand Olympic sports shooter (1968).
- Ted Rudd, 70, Australian rugby league player.
- Thorley Walters, 78, English actor.
- Anton Yugov, 86, Bulgarian politician, prime minister (1956–1962).

=== 7 ===
- André Busch, 78, French Olympic water polo player (1936).
- Suzy Prim, 94, French actress.
- Ivan Spiridonov, 85, Soviet statesman and party leader.
- Pete Williamson, 44, Canadian Olympic speed skater (1968).
- Jan Wølner, 81, Norwegian pianist.

=== 8 ===
- Gordon Stewart Anderson, 33, Canadian writer, AIDS-related complications.
- William M. Callaghan, 93, American Navy officer.
- James Franciscus, 57, American actor (Mr. Novak, Naked City, Beneath the Planet of the Apes), emphysema.
- Geoff Love, 73, British composer.
- Willie Nix, 68, American blues singer and drummer.
- Prem Nath Wahi, 83, Indian pathologist, writer, and academic.

=== 9 ===
- Danio Bardi, 54, Italian water polo player and Olympic champion (1960, 1964).
- Orhan Hançerlioğlu, 74, Turkish writer.
- José Salazar López, 81, Mexican cardinal of the Roman Catholic Church.
- Michael Lynch, 46 or 47, American-born Canadian professor and AIDS activist, AIDS-related complications.
- Bill Miller, 66, American basketball player and college basketball coach.

=== 10 ===
- Lycia de Biase Bidart, 81, Brazilian pianist, violinist, conductor, and composer.
- Aase Bye, 87, Norwegian actress.
- Jerry Leaf, 50, American businessman and cryonics pioneer, heart attack.
- Grace MacInnis, 85, Canadian socialist politician.
- Gerome Ragni, 55, American songwriter (Hair), cancer.

=== 11 ===
- Osvaldo Carvajal, 76, Chilean football player.
- Roger Christian, 57, American lyricist ("Little Deuce Coupe"), kidney failure.
- Mokhtar Dahari, 37, Malaysian football player, ALS.
- Atang de la Rama, 89, Filipino singer and actress.
- Fred Fechtman, 80, American basketball player.
- Hitoshi Igarashi, 44, Japanese scholar and translator (The Satanic Verses), stabbed.
- James McCallion, 72, Irish-American actor.
- Morton Smith, 76, American professor of ancient history, heart failure.
- Gale Wilhelm, 83, American writer, cancer.
- Fehmi Yavuz, 79, Turkish civil servant, academic, and writer.

=== 12 ===
- Frederick Allen Aldrich, 64, American marine biologist.
- Luce Guilbeault, 56, Canadian actress, cancer.
- Chaudhry Naseer Ahmad Malhi, 79, Pakistani politician.
- Francis Mugavero, 77, American Roman Catholic prelate, heart attack.
- Ken Yackel, 61, American ice hockey player (Boston Bruins) and Olympic medalist (1952).

=== 13 ===
- Jacques Geus, 71, Belgian racing cyclist.
- Aldo Ghira, 71, Italian Olympic water polo player (1948).
- Riccardo Lattanzi, 57, Italian football referee.
- Ray McPharlin, 75, Australian politician.

=== 14 ===
- Sir Godfrey Nicholson, 1st Baronet, 89, British politician.
- Robert Clavel, 78, French art director.
- Axel Eggebrecht, 92, German journalist, writer and screenwriter.
- Ruth Haktin, 89, Russian-Israeli politician.
- Pavel Morozenko, 52, Soviet actor, drowned.
- Constance Stokes, 85, Australian painter.

=== 15 ===
- Arthur Briggs, 92, American jazz trumpeter and orchestra leader.
- Keith Brown, 78, American athlete, politician and businessman.
- Bert Convy, 57, American game show host (Tattletales, Super Password, Win, Lose or Draw), brain cancer.
- Mihály Fekete, 96, Hungarian Olympic racewalker (1924).
- Roger Revelle, 82, American geophysicist, cardiac arrest.
- Joe Turnesa, 90, American golfer.
- Johnny Vergez, 85, American baseball player (New York Giants, Philadelphia Phillies, St. Louis Cardinals).

=== 16 ===
- Meindert DeJong, 85, Dutch-American children's author.
- Robert Motherwell, 76, American artist.
- Albert Eide Parr, 90, Norwegian-American marine biologist, zoologist and oceanographer.
- Frank Rizzo, 70, American politician, mayor of Philadelphia (1972–1980), heart attack.
- Robert Templeton, 62, American artist.
- Georges Tourry, 87, French architect.
- Dwight Weist, 81, American radio announcer, heart attack.

=== 17 ===
- Arthur Raymond Brooks, 95, American flying ace.
- Harold Butler, 78, English cricket player.
- Campbell Millar, 80, Canadian politician, member of the House of Commons of Canada (1962-1965).
- John O'Sullivan, 73, New Zealand cricketer.
- William Wesley Peters, 79, American architect.
- Joaquim Roderbourg, 73, Brazilian Olympic sailor (1956, 1964).
- Angela Sidney, 89, Native Canadian author and storyteller.
- Johan Vogt, 90, Norwegian economist and journalist.

=== 18 ===
- Michele Alverà, 61, Italian Olympic bobsledder (1952).
- Edmond Brossard, 91, French Olympic runner (1920).
- André Cools, 63, Belgian politician, shot.
- Magnus Goodman, 93, Icelandic-Canadian Olympic ice hockey player (1920).
- Bruno Mondi, 87, German cameraman and director of photography.
- Ambrus Nagy, 63, Hungarian Olympic fencer (1956), traffic collision.
- Hendrik Stroo, 63, Dutch Olympic canoer (1948).

=== 19 ===
- Guillermo Bonfil Batalla, 56, Mexican writer.
- Odette du Puigaudeau, 96, French ethnologist, traveler and journalist.
- Charles-André Julien, 99, French journalist and historian.
- Niilo Nikunen, 78, Finnish Olympic skier (1936).
- Bryan Charnley, 41, British Painter (Suicide)

=== 20 ===
- Vugar Huseynov, 22, Azerbaijani soldier and war hero, killed in action.
- Aleksey Konsovsky, 79, Soviet actor.
- Joe Martinelli, 74, American soccer forward.
- Rellys, 85, French actor.
- Earl Robinson, 81, American composer, traffic collision.
- Chithira Thirunal Balarama Varma, 78, Indian royal, Maharaja of Travancore (1924–1949), stroke.

=== 21 ===
- Jasmine Bligh, 78, British television presenter.
- Helen Meany, 86, American diver and Olympic champion (1920, 1924, 1928).
- Allan Oakley, 84, Australian rules footballer.
- Glauco Pellegrini, 72, Italian screenwriter and film director.
- Maxie Vaz, 68, Indian field hockey player and Olympic champion (1948).
- Paul Warwick, 22, British racing driver, racing accident.
- Allan Wilson, 56, New Zealand biochemist, leukemia.
- Theodore Wilson, 47, American actor (That's My Mama, Good Times, Sanford Arms), stroke.

=== 22 ===
- Louis-Henri Albinet, 93, French Olympic long jumper (1924).
- Jack Albright, 70, American baseball player (Philadelphia Phillies).
- Mike Baumgartner, 69, American Olympic bobsledder (1964).
- André Dhôtel, 90, French writer, novelist, storyteller, and poet.
- José Gómez-Sicre, 75, Cuban lawyer, art critic and writer.
- John Human, 79, English cricket player.
- Andrew Lee Jones, 35, American convicted murderer, execution by electrocution.
- John Reardon, 69, Australian cricketer.
- Jack Reardon, 77, Australian rugby player.

=== 23 ===
- Jūkei Fujioka, 57, Japanese actor and seiyū.
- Nora Gal, 79, Soviet translator and literary critic.
- Martin Hodgson, 82, English rugby player.
- Peter Kane, 73, English flyweight boxer and a world champions.
- Tadashi Katakura, 93, Japanese general.
- Mikhail Yasnov, 85, Soviet politician.

=== 24 ===
- Kaif Bhopali, 74, Indian Urdu poet and lyricist.
- Howie Carter, 86, American baseball player (Cincinnati Reds).
- Edmund Białas, 71, Polish football player.
- Freddie Brown, 80, English cricket player.
- Tadeusz Kwaśniak, 40, Polish serial killer, suicide by hanging.
- Isaac Bashevis Singer, 87, Polish-American writer, Nobel Prize recipient (1978), stroke.

=== 25 ===
- Eduardo de Guzmán, 83, Spanish journalist and writer.
- Henri George Doll, 88, French-American scientist.
- Lazar Kaganovich, 97, Soviet politician.
- Arthur Knight, 74, American movie critic, film historian, and TV host.
- George Meikle, 74, Australian cricketer.
- Douglas Stewart, 78, British Olympic equestrian (1948, 1952).
- Harry Vallence, 86, Australian rules footballer.

=== 26 ===
- Frédéric Dumas, 78, French writer.
- Andrés Gómez, 77, Mexican Olympic basketball player (1936).
- Marie-Louise Horn, 79, German tennis player.
- Jan Małkowiak, 72, Polish Olympic field hockey player (1952).
- Maria Treben, 83, Austrian writer and herbalist.

=== 27 ===
- Martin Attlee, 2nd Earl Attlee, 63, British politician.
- Pierre Brunet, 89, French-American Olympic figure skater (1924, 1928, 1932).
- Gino Colaussi, 77, Italian football player.
- John Friedrich, 40, Australian fraudster, suicide by gunshot.
- Xu Shijie, 70, Chinese communist revolutionary and politician.
- Wolf Witzemann, 67, Austrian art director.

=== 28 ===
- Martin Bolger, 84, Australian rules footballer.
- Suzanne Davis, 79, American figure skater and Olympian (1932).
- Aad de Bruyn, 81, Dutch athlete and shot put champion.
- Ray Felix, 60, American basketball player (New York Knicks, Minneapolis/Los Angeles Lakers).
- Jan Gonda, 86, Dutch indologist.
- Wang Ming-Dao, 91, Chinese protestant writer, evangelist and dissident.
- Al Huggins, 81, Canadian ice hockey player (Montreal Maroons).
- Pedro Massana, 67, Spanish Olympic rower (1952).
- A. Al Moore, 76, American football player (Green Bay Packers).
- Elko Mrduljaš, 81, Yugoslav Olympic rower (1936).
- Dean Refram, 54, American golfer.

=== 29 ===
- María Antinea, 76, Spanish actress, vedette, and dancer.
- Christian de Castries, 88, French general.
- Yusuf Khattak, 73, Pakistani lawyer, politician, and intellectual.
- Albert Lord, 78, American academic.

=== 30 ===
- William Ball, 60, American stage director.
- Vincent P. Biunno, 75, American district judge (United States District Court for the District of New Jersey).
- Tom Bridger, 57, English racing driver.
- Allen Conkwright, 94, American baseball player (Detroit Tigers).
- Lee Eastman, 81, American business attorney, stroke.
- Benny Grant, 83, Canadian ice hockey player (Toronto Maple Leafs, New York Americans, Boston Bruins).
- Flora Steiger-Crawford, 91, Swiss architect and sculptor.

=== 31 ===
- Miro Barešić, 40, Yugoslav-Croatian émigré and neo-fascist paramilitary, killed in action.
- Charlie Beal, 82, American jazz pianist.
- John Dobb, 89, American baseball player (Chicago White Sox).
- Charles Jonker, 57, South African Olympic cyclist (1956, 1960).
- Al Loquasto, 51, Italian-American racecar driver, plane crash.
- Nikola Yordanov, 52, Bulgarian football player.
