= Horovlu =

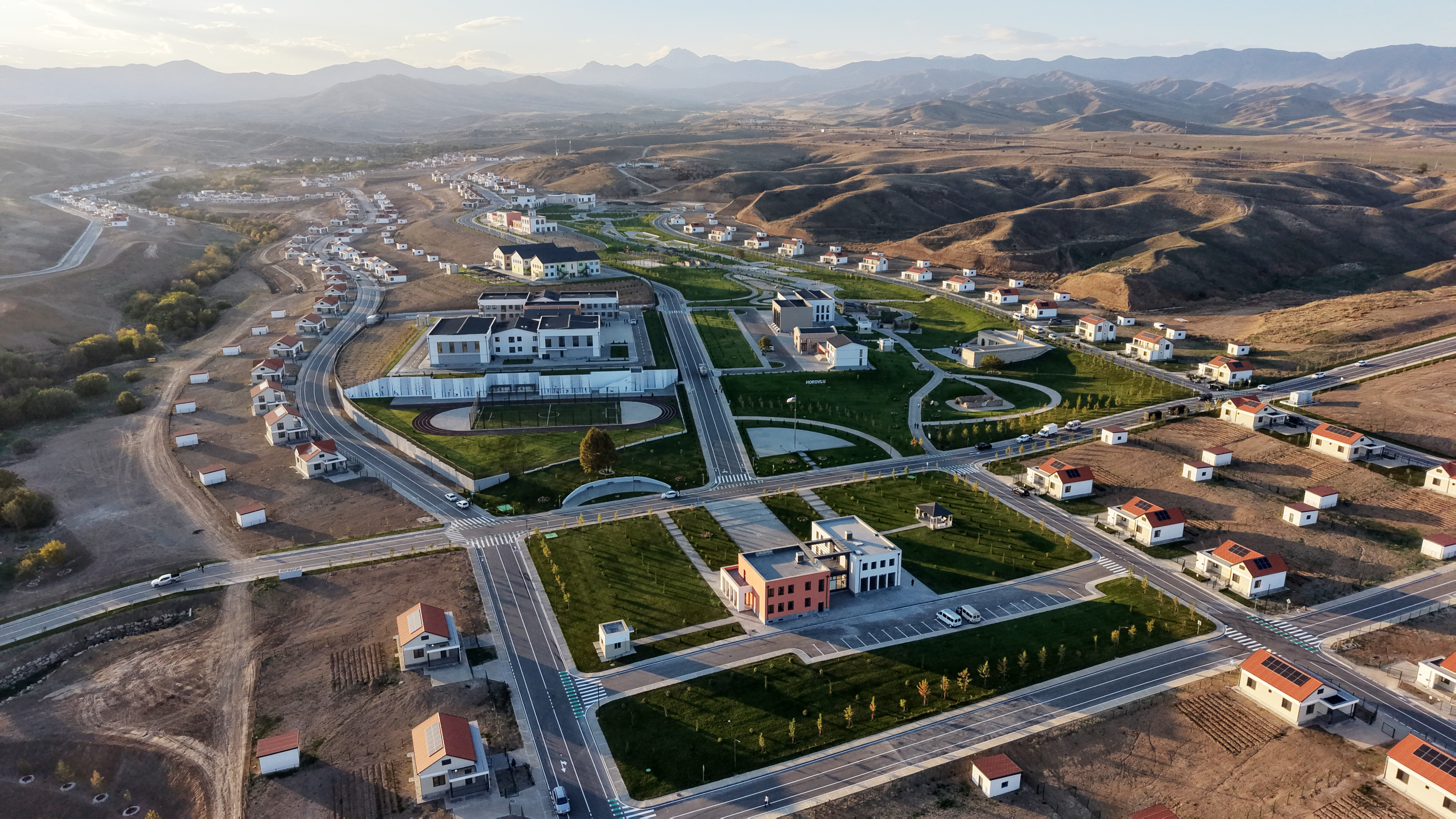

- Location within Azerbaijan
- Coordinates: 39°24′00″N 47°05′41″E
- Country: Azerbaijan
- Rayon: Jabrayil

Population
  - Total: 0
- Time zone: UTC+4 (AZT)
  - Summer (DST): UTC+5 (AZT)

Horovlu (Gorovlu, and Khorovlu) village within the administrative-territorial unit of the same name in the Jabrayil district of Azerbaijan, located on a plain, 8 km east of the city of Jabrayil.

It was occupied by the Armed Forces of Armenia between 1993 and late 2020.

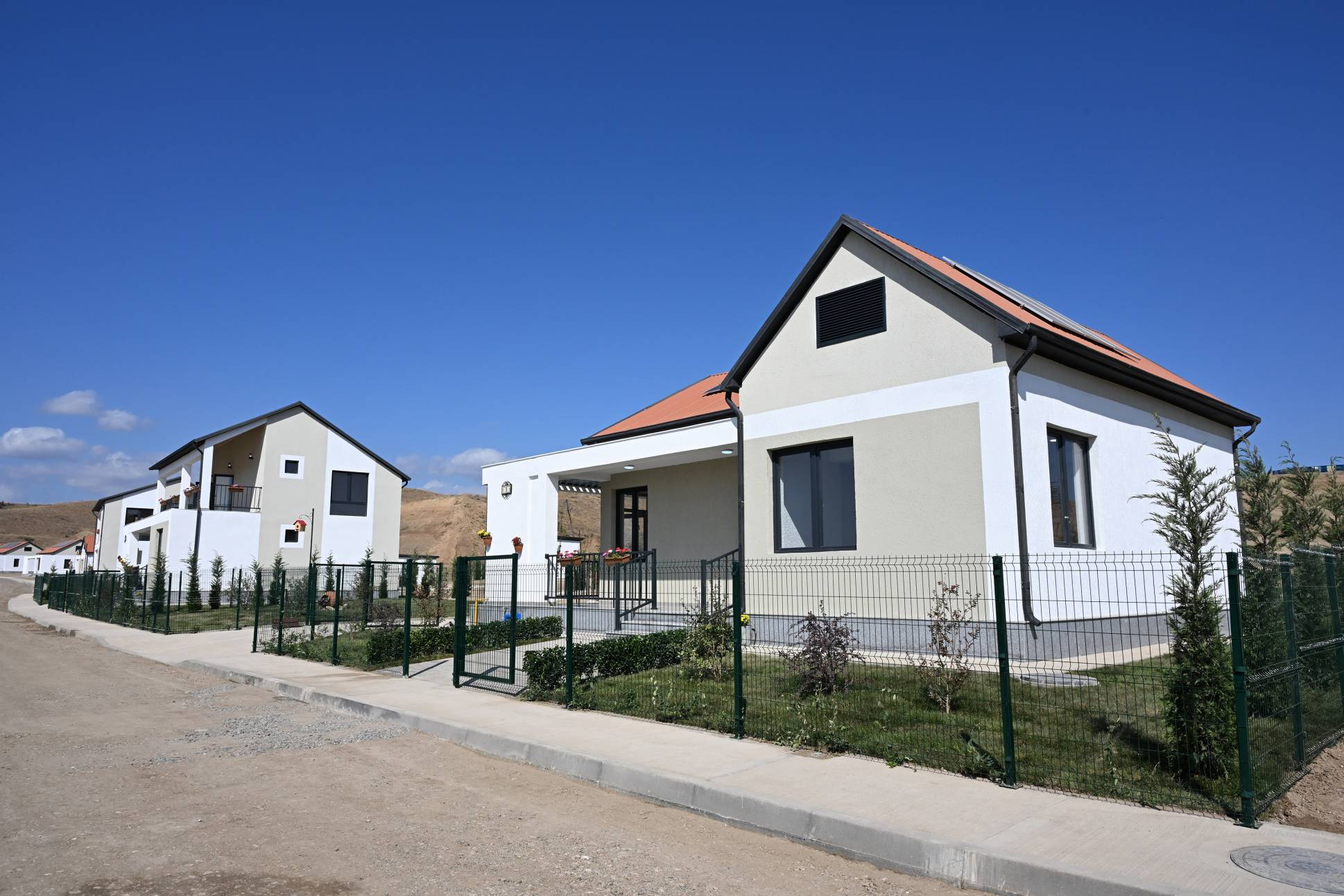
Horovlu Village

== Etymology ==
According to the “Encyclopaedic Dictionary of Toponyms of Azerbaijan”, the name of the village comes from the name of Horov village in Iranian Azerbaijan, people from which having resettled here in the 19th century, founded the village.

== History ==
During the years of the Russian Empire, the village was part of Jabrayil district, Elizavetpol province. During the Soviet years, the village was part of the Horovlu village council, Jabrayil district, Azerbaijan SSR. The village was captured by Armenian forces in the First Karabakh War and was destroyed.

The BBC reported that all liberated villages, according to Azerbaijan, in the south, judging by satellite images, lie in ruins and have been completely or almost completely abandoned since the Azerbaijani population left them in the early 1990s to escape the advancing Armenians.

On the evening of 4 October 2020, on AzTV, the state television channel, in a life transmission, the President of Azerbaijan Ilham Aliyev, in an address to the people, stated that the Azerbaijani Army liberated nine villages of the Jabrayil district: Karkhulu, Shukurbayli, Charakan, Dashkesen, Horovlu, Mahmudlu, Jafarabad, Yukhary-Maralyan and Dajal.

On May 4, the President of the Republic of Azerbaijan Ilham Aliyev visited the village, taking part in the ceremony of laying the foundation of the village.

== Population ==
According to the “Code of statistical data of the Transcaucasian region population, extracted from the family lists of 1886”, in the village of Horovlu, Horovlu rural district there were 184 dym and here lived 894 Azerbaijanis (indicated as “Tatars”), who were peasants.

According to the publication “Administrative Division of the ASSR”, prepared in 1933 by the Department of National Economic Accounting of the Azerbaijan SSR (AzNEA), as of 1 January 1933 in the village of Horovlu, which was the centre of the Horovlu village council (villages of Chapand, Papy), Jabrayil district of Azerbaijan SSR, there were 187 farms and 934 inhabitants. 99.8% of the population of the village council were Turks (Azerbaijanis).

In 1986, in the village lived 1 410 people.
