= Çərəkən =

- Location within Azerbaijan
- Coordinates: 39°24′41″N 47°03′54″E
- Country: Azerbaijan
- District: Jabrayil

Population
  - Total: 0
- Time zone: UTC+4 (AZT)

Çərəkən (Charakan) is a village in Horovlu administrative-territorial unit of Jabrayil district, Azerbaijan, located on a plain, 3 km northeast of the city of Jabrayil.

== Etymology ==
Village's name is derived from the words "chara" (Azerb. Çərə), meaning “pasture” and "kand (Azerb. kənd), meaning “village”. Thus, oikonym means “a village founded on a pasture site”. The sound "d" was subsequently omitted from the name of the village.

== History ==
The village was founded in an area called "chere".

During the years of the Russian Empire, the village of Charakanlu (Charakan) was part of Jabrayil district (later - Karyagin) of Elizavetpol province.

During the Soviet years, the village was part of Jabrayil district of Azerbaijan SSR. The village was captured by Armenian forces in the First Karabakh War and was destroyed.

On the evening of 4 October 2020, on AzTV, the state television channel, in a life transmission, the President of Azerbaijan Ilham Aliyev, in an address to the people, stated that the Azerbaijani Army liberated nine villages of the Jabrayil district: Karkhulu, Shukurbayli, Charakan, Dashkesen, Horovlu, Mahmudlu, Jafarabad, Yukhary-Maralyan and Dajal.

The BBC reported that all liberated villages, according to Azerbaijan, in the south, judging by satellite images, lie in ruins and have been completely or almost completely abandoned since the Azerbaijani population left them in the early 1990s to escape the advancing Armenians.

On 21 October 2020, the Azerbaijani Ministry of Defence published a video footage showing the village of Charakan under Azerbaijani control.

== Population ==
According to the “Code of statistical data of the Transcaucasian region population, extracted from the family lists of 1886”, in the village of Charakanlu, Hajyly rural district there were 38 dym and 165 residents Azerbaijanis (listed as “Tatars”), who were Sunni by religion and peasants.

According to the “Caucasian Calendar” of 1912, 309 people lived in the village of Charakan, Karyagin district, mostly Azerbaijanis, indicated in the calendar as “Tatars”.
