= John Leehane =

John Leehane can refer to:

- John Leehane (cricketer, born 1921), an Australian cricketer
- John Leehane (cricketer, born 1950), an Australian cricketer
