= Alan Oakley =

Alan Oakley may refer to:

- Alan Oakley (journalist), English-born Australian journalist
- Alan Oakley (designer) (1927–2012), British bicycle designer

== See also ==
- Allan Oakley (1907–1991), Australian rules footballer
