= Armenians in Hungary =

Total population
- 3,500, 6,000, 15,000, 30,000

Regions with significant populations

Languages
- Armenian, Hungarian

Religion
- Armenian Apostolic, Armenian Catholic

Armenians in Hungary (Armenian: Հայերը Հունգարիայում, romanized: Hayery Hungariayum; Hungarian: magyarországi örmények) are ethnic Armenians living in Hungary.

The history of Armenians in Hungary dates back to the medieval period, from around the 10th century.

== History ==
The first Armenians to reach Hungary presumably arrived in the 10–11th century or even before. Armenians were present from early on in Hungary as clearly attested in a document issued by Hungarian King Ladislaus IV the Cuman (late 13th century). The inhabitants of the former capital of Armenia, Ani, moved to Moldavia, then, after some local conflicts, requested settlement in neighbouring Hungary. The local head of Transylvania (modern-day Romania), Prince Michael von Apaffy, gave approval for the resettlement of about 600 families; 55 families out of which received aristocracy and were even given higher titles later. They were allowed to found their own trading towns, the most notable one being Szamosújvár (today Gherla, Romania) called Armenopolis/Armenierstadt or Hayakaghak (Հայաքաղաք). They founded schools, built hospitals, joined the Hungarian army and contributed to the culture of Hungary. They gained positions, became teachers, medical doctors, priests, generals, ministers, etc. They preserved their culture - see the architecture, the ceilings of the churches in Gyergyószentmiklós, the cuisine - though they respected the Hungarian traditions. Many families Magyarized their family names.

== Present day ==
Most modern Armenians in Hungary immigrated to the country after the dissolution of the USSR. Estimates of Armenians in Hungary range from 3,500 to 30,000 living in the nation today, making up roughly 0.01% of the population. Approximately, two thirds of Hungary's Armenians population is found in Budapest and the surrounding Pest county. Armenians in Hungary have established 31 "self-governments" and roughly half of them speak Armenian as their mother tongue. The Armenian Catholic Priesthood has existed in Hungary since 1924 and hosts a number of cultural programs, as does the Armenian Cultural and Information Centre in Budapest.

== Notable Hungarians of Armenian heritage ==
Currently:

- Tamás Aján, President of the International Weightlifting Federation and former member of the International Olympic Committee
- Tristan Azbej, politician
- Tigran Vardanjan, figure skater, Hungarian national champion in 2007-2009

Prides from the past with international success:

- Ilona Dajbukát, opera singer
- Marcell Jankovics, graphic, film maker, medalist in Cannes
- Líviusz Gyulai, graphic, printmaker, illustrator, awarded in Venice in 1970 and in Cannes 1999, medalist
- Pongrác Kacsóh (1873-1923), composer
- Miklós Kocsár (Kotcharian) (1933-2019), composer
- Gerő Mály (1884-1952), actor
- Stefánia Moldován, opera singer
- Edgar Chahine, painter, born in Hungary, schooled in Venice, made his career in Paris
- Oxendius Vărzărescu, mechitarist archbishop in Venice
- Emil Telmányi (mother line: Akontz), violinist

Local prides from the past:

- János Czetz (1822–1904), general, a prominent Hungarian freedom fighter, chief-of-staff of Hungarian army
- Gergely Csiky (1842- 1891), drama writer of 33 plays and several books like Greek Mythology; theater is named after him
- István Gorove (family: Akontz) (1819-1881), politician, minister of agriculture, commerce
- Ernő Kiss, general (1799–1849), one of the main figures of the Hungarian Revolution of 1848, and one of the 13 Martyrs of Arad
- Vilmos Lázár, general (1817–1849), one of the main figures of the Hungarian Revolution of 1848, one of the 13 Martyrs of Arad
- Géza Duka de Kádár (1867–1913), diplomat, politician

20th century:

- Gábor Agárdy (born Gábor Arklian), notable actor, "actor of the nation" (the highest civil rank and honor that an actor can have in Hungary)
- László Endre (born Paskuian), writer
- Zoltán Nuridsány (1925-1974), painter
- Gergely Pongrátz (1932-2005), veteran of the Hungarian Revolution of 1956, Commander of the Corvin Passage (Corvin Köz)

== See also ==
- Armenian diaspora
- Demographics of Hungary
- Armenia–Hungary relations
