= Ramil Safarov =

Azerbaijani officer who was convicted of the murder of an Armenian lieutenant

- Ramil Səfərov
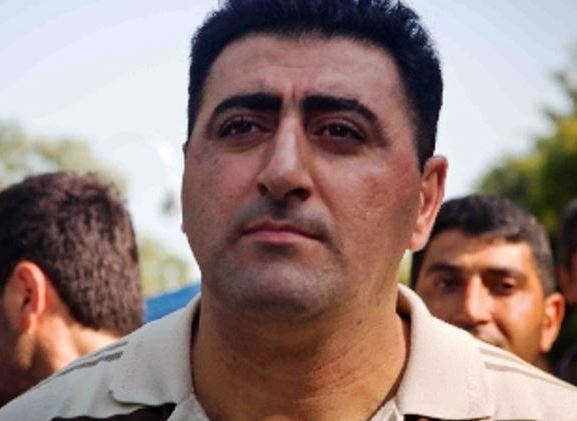
- Safarov in 2012
- Born: 25 August 1977 (age 49); Şükürbəyli, Jabrayil District, Azerbaijani SSR, Soviet Union
- Occupation: Colonel in Azerbaijani Army
- Status: Extradited to Azerbaijan, pardoned by President Ilham Aliyev
- Allegiance: Azerbaijan
- Motive: Anti-Armenian sentiment
- Conviction: Premeditated murder
- Penalty: Life imprisonment

Details
- Victims: Gurgen Margaryan, 25
- Date: 19 February 2004
- Country: Hungary

Ramil Sahib oghlu Safarov (Azerbaijani: Ramil Sahib oğlu Səfərov [ɾɑˈmil sɑˈhip oɣˈlu sæˈfæɾof], born 25 August 1977) is an officer of the Azerbaijani Army who was convicted of the 2004 murder of Gurgen Margaryan, a lieutenant of the Armenian Army. During a NATO-sponsored training seminar in Budapest, Safarov broke into Margaryan's dormitory room at night and axed Margaryan to death while he was asleep. In Azerbaijan, Safarov has become a highly celebrated figure for his killing of an Armenian.

In 2006, Safarov was convicted of premeditated murder and sentenced to life imprisonment in Hungary with a 30-year minimum. After his request under the Strasbourg Convention, he was extradited on 31 August 2012, to Azerbaijan, where he was greeted as a hero, pardoned by Azerbaijani president Ilham Aliyev despite contrary assurances made to Hungary, promoted to the rank of major and given an apartment and over eight years of back pay. According to Azerbaijani authorities, Safarov was pardoned in compliance with the Constitution. Following Safarov's pardon, Armenia severed diplomatic relations with Hungary and immediate protests broke out in Yerevan. The extradition was widely condemned by international organizations and governments of many countries, including the United States, Russia and France.

In a 2017 investigation into the Azerbaijani laundromat money-laundering scheme, it was uncovered and revealed that several bank transfers in 2012, totalling more than US$9 million, made to the Hungarian MKB Bank account in Budapest right around the time when the Hungarian government extradited Safarov to Azerbaijan.

In December 2025, Azerbaijani media reported that Ramil Safarov had been promoted to the military rank of Colonel.

== Early life ==
Ramil Safarov was born on 25 August 1977, in the Şükürbəyli village of Jabrayil District, former Azerbaijan Soviet Socialist Republic of the Soviet Union (now Azerbaijan), where he finished middle school. He is one of four brothers. Jabrayil was occupied by Armenian forces on 26 August 1993, and remained under the control of the self-proclaimed Armenian Republic of Artsakh (Nagorno-Karabakh) as part of the unresolved Nagorno-Karabakh conflict until 4 October 2020. Safarov's family fled to Baku in 1991. During a court hearing, Safarov claimed to recount memories from the years of war, during which he had lost family members. This, however, contradicted another version he told the court, where he stated that he was studying in Azerbaijan's capital of Baku and in Turkey from 1992 to 1996. He continued his studies at Maltepe Military High School in İzmir, Turkey, and then at the Turkish Military Academy, graduating in 2000, after which he returned to Azerbaijan.

== Budapest murder ==
In January 2004, the 26-year-old Ramil Safarov, along with another officer from Azerbaijan, went to Budapest, Hungary, to participate in the three-month English language courses, organized by NATO's Partnership for Peace program for military personnel from different countries. Two Armenian officers, a 25-year-old Gurgen Margaryan and Hayk Makuchyan, also participated in this program.

External image
- The murder weapon

On the evening of 18 February, Safarov bought an axe and a honing stone at a Tesco near Ferenc Puskás Stadium. He took them in the bag to his dormitory room at the Zrínyi Miklós National Defence University, where all the course participants were staying. Safarov's roommate had returned to his native Ukraine to attend the funerals of his relatives and so nobody interrupted Safarov as he sharpened the axe in his room. At around 5:00 am on 19 February, Safarov took the axe and went to Margaryan's room, which he was sharing with his Hungarian roommate, Balázs Kuti. The door of their room was not locked. Safarov attacked the sleeping Margaryan with the axe and delivered 16 blows to his body, which almost severed Margaryan’s head. The noises woke up Kuti, who was shocked seeing the Azerbaijani officer standing by Gurgen’s bed with a long axe in his hands. As Kuti later testified, "By that time I understood that something terrible had happened for there was blood all around. I started to shout at the Azerbaijani urging him to stop it. He said that he had no problems with me and would not touch me, stabbed Gurgen a couple of more times and left. The expression of his face was as if he was glad he had finished something important. Greatly shocked, I ran out of the room to find help, and Ramil went in another direction".

Afterwards, Safarov headed for the room of Makuchyan, the other Armenian student, with the intention of attacking him also, but found his door locked. He shouted out Makuchyan’s name in a threatening voice. The half-sleeping Makuchyan wanted to open the door, but his Lithuanian roommate stopped him and called his compatriot next door to check what was going on. Meanwhile, Safarov went to look for Makuchyan in the room of the Serbian and the Ukrainian roommates, showing them the blood-stained axe and stating that he thirsted for nobody's blood but Armenian. Later the eyewitnesses confessed that they were afraid to approach Ramil with a blood-stained axe closer than three meters.

Soon after, the Hungarian police, which was summoned by Balázs Kuti, arrived and arrested Safarov at the scene. A Hungarian court later found that it was an attempt on Makuchyan’s life and recognized the latter also as a victim. While announcing the verdict the judge particularly emphasized that if Safarov had not been restrained by his fellow officers he would have killed the second Armenian officer as well.

=== Interrogation and trial ===
During his initial interrogation Safarov confessed to killing Margaryan and his intention to kill Makuchyan. Questioned about his motives during the interrogation, Safarov stated:

I regret that I hadn't killed any Armenian before this. The army sent me to this training and here I learnt that two Armenians were taking the same course with us. I must say that hatred against Armenians grew inside me. In the beginning we were greeting each other, or rather they said "hi" to me but I didn't respond. The reason why I committed the murder was that they passed by and smiled in our face. At that moment I decided to kill them, i.e. to saw their heads off...

I have been a soldier for 14 years now, but I cannot give an answer whether I would kill if I were a civil person. I haven't thought on the question whether I would kill Armenians if I were civil [sic]. My job is to kill all, because as long as they live, we will suffer.

If not here and now, then I would do the same thing any other time and in any other place. If there were more Armenians here I would like to kill all of them. It is a pity this was the first occasion and I hadn't managed to get better prepared for this action... My calling is to kill all the Armenians.

According to Balázs Kuti, at the very beginning of the language courses, when the students got acquainted, there was a conversation about different international issues, but nobody spoke of it afterwards. Kuti also said that he had not noticed any strain in the relationship between Margaryan and the Azerbaijani officers. Makuchyan's neighbor, officer Saulius Paulius, also said that he observed nothing strange in the relationship between the Armenian and the Azerbaijani students. The police afterwards interrogated all the students and all testified that there was no conflict between the Armenian and the Azerbaijani officers and that they did not even interact with each other.

Later in an interview to the Armenian newspaper Iravunk, Makuchyan confirmed that neither Gurgen nor him had had any contacts with any of the Azerbaijani officers. "They were not of a communicative type. Usually, after classes, they went straight to their rooms", said Makuchyan. To the question as to why he chose to attack Margaryan first, Safarov answered it was because he was big, muscular and of sportive type.

When the case went to trial Safarov's defense claimed that the murder was committed because Margaryan had insulted the Azerbaijani flag. The claim that Safarov had been somehow insulted underwent several variations among press and politicians in Azerbaijan, without any evidence. Safarov did not mention any insult in either his court trial, and made it very clear he killed Margaryan just because he was an Armenian. No witnesses were ever called during the trial to corroborate these allegations of harassment in court and prosecution lawyers strongly disputed that they had taken place. Despite the lack of evidence the Azerbaijani media, including state-owned media outlets, have circulated the version of the flag for making Safarov a national hero.

The defense also alleged that Safarov was mentally sick when committing the murder; however, the forensic medical examination, which was upheld by the judge, showed that "Safarov was sane and aware of the consequences of his act".

On 13 April 2006, a Hungarian court sentenced Safarov to life imprisonment without right of appeal for 30 years. The judge, András Vaskuti, cited the premeditated nature and brutality of the crime and the fact that Safarov showed no remorse for his deeds as the reasons for the sentence. Handing down a life sentence, the judge particularly emphasised that “the murder of a sleeping man in peace time is always a crime and cannot be an act of heroism”. On 22 February 2007, a Hungarian appeals court upheld the ruling following an appeal filed by Safarov's lawyer. While serving his sentence, Safarov translated several novels by Hungarian authors into Azeri, including Magda Szabó's The Door (Hungarian: Az ajtó) and The Paul Street Boys (Hungarian: A Pál utcai fiúk) (youth novel by the Hungarian writer Ferenc Molnár).

=== Reaction to the murder and the sentence ===
A lawyer representing the victim's family welcomed the sentence as a "good decision for the Hungarian court and for Armenian society."

Many officials in Azerbaijan publicly praised Safarov's actions, while there were also those who condemned them. Elmira Süleymanova, the human rights commissioner (ombudsman) of Azerbaijan, declared that Safarov's punishment was far too harsh and that "Safarov must become an example of patriotism for the Azerbaijani youth". The banned radical Azerbaijan National Democrat Party awarded Safarov with the title of "Man of the Year 2005" for killing an Armenian.

Fuad Agayev, a prominent Azeri lawyer, said that Azeris "...have to urgently stop this current campaign to raise Safarov to the rank of national hero. He is no hero.”

The United States House Committee on Foreign Affairs condemned Azerbaijan's reaction to the brutal murder of the Armenian officer in a hearing. A report which was published by the Committee on Foreign Affairs contained a statement by Bryan Ardouny, Executive Director of the Armenian Assembly of America, who stated that "The Azerbaijani government has also consistently failed to condemn Safarov, an Azeri military officer who in 2003 [sic] brutally murdered an Armenian participant at a NATO Partnership for Peace military training exercise in Budapest, Hungary. Instead, it has encouraged domestic media and various organizations to treat the murderer as a celebrity. That individual has since been awarded the title of 'Man of the Year' by Azerbaijan’s National-Democratic Party."

== Extradition and pardon ==
=== Safarov's welcome in Azerbaijan ===
After serving eight years of the life sentence, Safarov was extradited under the framework guidelines of the 1983 Strasbourg Convention on the Transfer of Sentenced Persons and transferred to Azerbaijan on 31 August 2012. Although the Hungarian government stated that it had received assurances from the Azerbaijan government that the remainder of the sentence would be enforced, President Ilham Aliyev issued a pardon immediately upon Safarov's arrival in Baku and ordered that he be "freed from the term of his punishment." The Government of Azerbaijan reportedly offered to buy 2-4 billion dollars of Hungarian sovereign bonds in order to secure his release.

Azerbaijani Defense Minister Safar Abiyev promoted Safarov to the rank of major and the Defense Ministry of Azerbaijan provided him with an apartment and over eight years of back pay. On September 1, Azerbaijani Foreign Ministry spokesman Elman Abdullayev said that the return of Safarov to Azerbaijan is a matter of relations between Azerbaijan and Hungary, which was resolved in the "framework of the law and is not contrary to norms and principles of the international law." He described Armenian President Serzh Sargsyan's statements as "hysterical" and accused him of being one of the leaders of the group that committed the Khojaly massacre.

After arriving in Baku, Safarov stated: "This is restoration of justice. It was a bit of surprise for me." He then visited Martyrs' Lane to commemorate the Azerbaijani soldiers fought and died for the country's integrity at the First Nagorno-Karabakh War. He also visited Alley of Honor and laid flowers at the tomb of Azerbaijan's former president Heydar Aliyev, his wife and ophtalmologist Zarifa Aliyeva and the Eternal Flame monument; and visited a monument to Turkish soldiers.

Novruz Mammadov, the head of the presidential foreign relations department, said that secret talks had been going on for a year between Azerbaijan and Hungary, and that agreement had been reached on the visit of Hungarian prime minister Viktor Orbán.

A week before Safarov's release there came reports that the two countries were in talks over a loan from Azerbaijan to Hungary of 2-3bn euros ($2.5–3.8bn; £1.6–2.4bn) which gave way to speculations in Hungary that Orbán extradited Safarov in return for a promise that Azerbaijan would buy Hungarian bonds. In a 2017 investigation, an Azerbaijani laundromat money-laundering scheme was uncovered and revealed, among many other briberies, that several bank transfers in 2012, totalling more than US$9 million, made to the Hungarian MKB Bank account in Budapest right around the time when the Hungarian government extradited Safarov to Azerbaijan. Several media outlets suggested a connection between Viktor Orbán's visit to Baku in June and the first instalment of $7.6 million transferred to the bank account in July, since by the end of August Safarov was handed over to Azerbaijan.

Azerbaijani high-ranking officials have praised Safarov's extradition and pardon giving him a hero's welcome. Presidential Administration of Azerbaijan Novruz Mammadov stated in the interview:

Yes, he is in Azerbaijan. This is a great news for all of us. It is very touching to see this son of the homeland, which was thrown in jail after he defended his country's honor and dignity of the people.

The Ombudsperson of Azerbaijan stated that Ramil Safarov "should become an exemplary model of patriotism for the Azerbaijani youth." Elnur Aslanov, Chief of the Political Analysis and Information Department of the Presidential Administration of Azerbaijan said that "...heroes as Mubariz Ibrahimov and Ramil Safarov with their bravery brought the second breath to the Azerbaijani society and people”.

Ali Ahmedov, Deputy Chairman and Executive Secretary of the ruling New Azerbaijan Party stated that the "Order of President Ilham Aliyev to pardon Ramil Safarov is a triumph of determination, courage and justice".

Prominent public figures in Azerbaijan have made similar statements endorsing Safarov's image as a hero. Famous Azerbaijani singer and a deputy of Azerbaijani Parliament Zeynab Khanlarova made the following statement:

Safarov is not just a hero of Azerbaijan, he is an international hero! A monument should be set up to him. Not every man could do this. There are two heroes − Mr. Ilham Aliyev and Ramil Safarov. I would have done exactly as Ramil did. He did the right thing to take the life of an Armenian.

Commenting on the hero's welcome received by Safarov in Azerbaijan, Geydar Dzhemal, political scientist, the Chairman of the Islamic Committee of Russia, said, “I am absolutely convinced that the welcoming of Ramil Safarov as a hero in Azerbaijan is quite natural”.

On 19 September 2013, during the opening ceremony of the Guba Memorial Complex, President Aliyev stated that they "restored the justice" by returning Safarov to Azerbaijan. Аzeri leaders have more than once called Armenians number one enemy, while Safarov’s attorney stated at Budapest trial that "killing an Armenian is not a crime in Azerbaijan."

=== International reaction ===
==== Armenia ====
External videos
- Protesters burn the Hungarian flag in Yerevan on YouTube

President Serzh Sargsyan announced Armenia's suspension of diplomatic relations and all official communications with Hungary on the day of Safarov's release. "This is not a simple murder. It is murder on ethnic grounds," he said.

Sargsyan suggested the possibility that Azerbaijani president Ilham Aliyev and Hungarian prime minister Viktor Orbán had entered into a secret agreement during the latter's visit to Baku on 30 June 2012. A number of sources in the media have also speculated that Hungary's deepening economic ties with Azerbaijan may have had something to do with Safarov's release. Sargsyan concluded his statements by saying, "with their joint actions the authorities of Hungary and Azerbaijan have opened the door for the recurrence of such crimes."

Demonstrations took place in front of the Hungarian consulate in Yerevan, during which the building was pelted with tomatoes. Demonstrators also burned a Hungarian flag. A photo of Safarov was also burned by the activists. National Assembly Speaker Hovik Abrahamyan cancelled his visit to Hungary planned for late September.

Hayk Makuchyan, whom Safarov unsuccessfully planned to kill on the same night as Margaryan, stated that he will petition to all judicial instances and possibly The Hague, since the murder was committed on ethnic grounds, adding: "I had no doubt that Ramil Safarov would not have served his sentence in the case of an extradition. But the Azerbaijani leadership’s cynicism surpassed everything."

==== Hungary ====
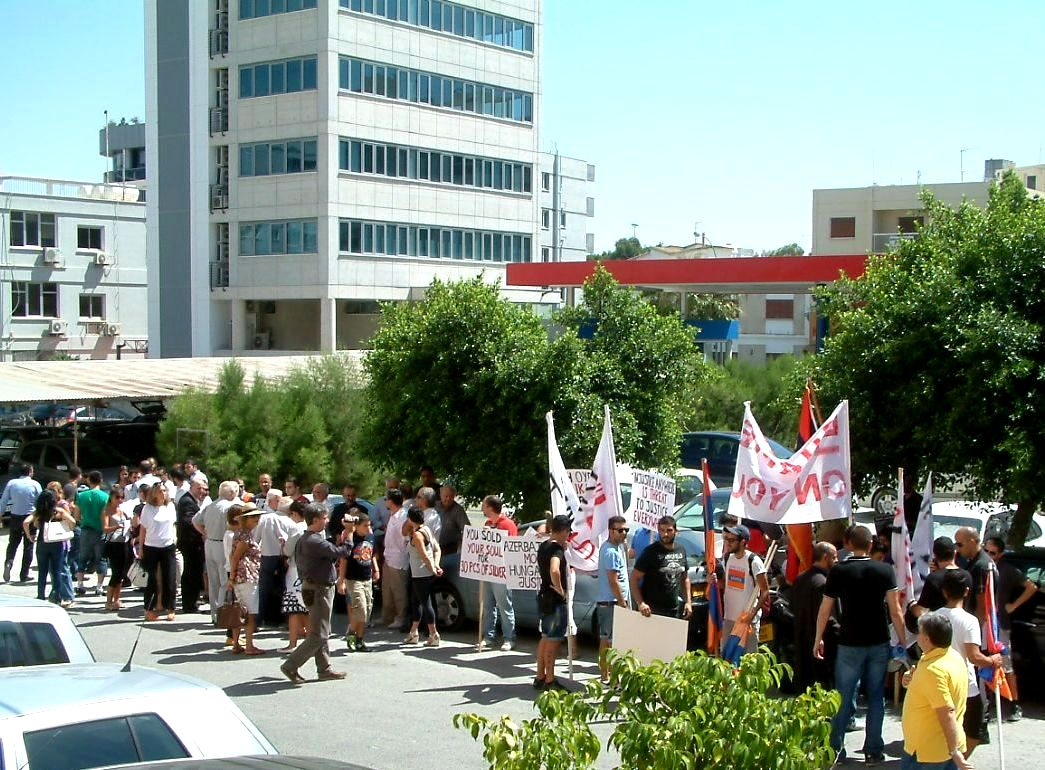

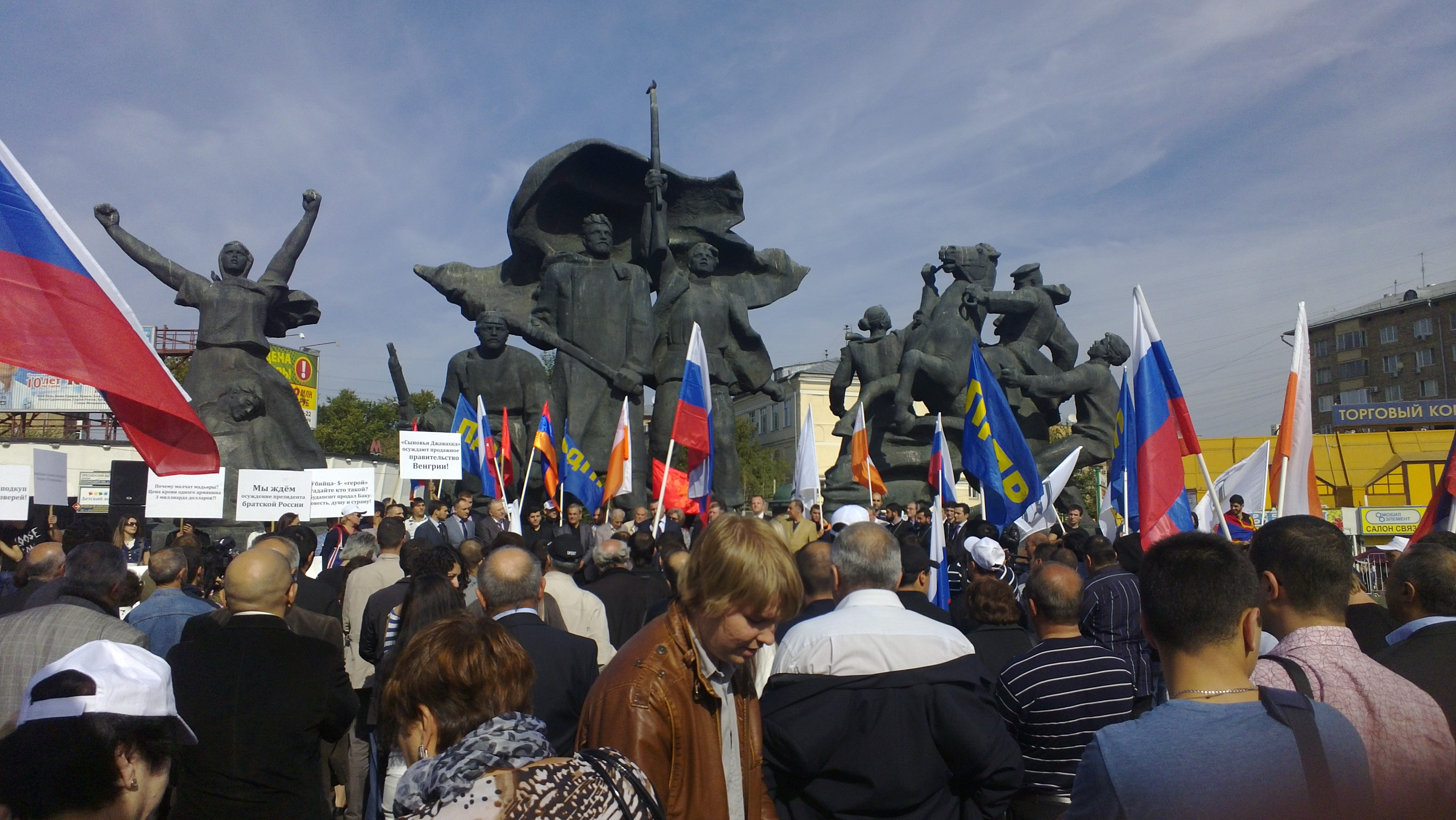
Armenians protest in front of the Hungarian Embassy in Nicosia

On September 2 the Ministry of Foreign Affairs of Hungary announced the country "refuses to accept and condemns the action of Azerbaijan, which contradicts the relevant rules of international law and sharply contrasts the undertaking of the Azerbaijani side in this matter, confirmed by the Deputy Minister of Justice of the Republic of Azerbaijan in his letter <...> of 15 August 2012." The Ministry of Foreign Affairs condemned the action of Azerbaijan in a diplomatic note. The press release also states that "Hungary regards the decision of Azerbaijan inconsistent with the spirit of cooperation based on mutual trust that has been achieved during the past years between our respective countries."

The opposition parties strongly criticized Viktor Orbán and his cabinet for the move. Despite government denials, opposition parties said Orbán let Safarov return to Azerbaijan in the hope of economic favors in return from the energy producer Azerbaijan.

Representatives of MSZP, the then largest opposition party, called for various subcommittees of the parliament to examine who exactly made the decision and why the procedure was kept secret. MSZP had been in power until 2010, and had refused to release Safarov. The Socialists have also called on Orbán to resign over the decision.

==== Other countries ====
- United States: Both the United States National Security Council and the State Department expressed "deep concern" over the matter. The press statement from Washington said: "We are expressing our deep concern to Azerbaijan regarding this action and seeking an explanation. We are also seeking further details from Hungary regarding the decision to transfer Mr. Safarov to Azerbaijan." National Security Council Spokesman Tommy Vietor also stated: "President Obama is deeply concerned by today’s announcement that the President of Azerbaijan has pardoned Ramil Safarov following his return from Hungary... We are communicating to Azerbaijani authorities our disappointment about the decision to pardon Safarov. This action is contrary to ongoing efforts to reduce regional tensions and promote reconciliation." "We were appalled by the glorification that we heard in some quarters of somebody who was convicted of murder," said Philip H. Gordon, the U.S. Assistant Secretary of State for European and Eurasian Affairs. He called the case "a real provocation in the region." The Azerbaijani foreign ministry responded, "it is perplexing that the U.S. government interferes in the relations of two independent states – Azerbaijan and Hungary" and suggested that the U.S. response was connected to the elections in the U.S.
- Russia: On 3 September, the Russian Ministry of Foreign Affairs issued the following statement: "In Russia, which is the co-chairman of the OSCE Minsk Group on the Nagorno-Karabakh conflict settlement, received reports with deep concern regarding the clemency of Baku Azeri serviceman Ramil Safarov, who was sentenced to life imprisonment for the commission of the murder of an Armenian officer with an extreme atrocity in Hungary in the 2004, as well as regarding the preceded decision of the Hungarian authorities to extradite him to Azerbaijan. We believe that these actions of Azerbaijan, as well as the Hungarian authorities to run counter to the efforts agreed at international level, particularly through the OSCE Minsk Group, directed to reduce tension in the region."
- France: Foreign Ministry said that "France expresses her concern following the announcement of the pardon granted to M. Safarov by the Azerbaijani authorities". As one of the OSCE Minsk Group countries, France is "strongly committed to a peaceful solution to the Nagorno-Karabakh conflict, [and] believes that this decision risks seriously damaging the negotiation efforts and the establishment of a climate of trust between the parties."
- Sweden: Swedish Foreign Minister Carl Bildt tweeted "Strange decision in Azerbaijan to pardon man having murdered an Armenian in Hungary. Rule of law must apply."
- Cyprus: Foreign Affairs Minister Erato Kozakou-Marcoullis's statement said "we deeply regret and deplore this Presidential pardon and the damage inflicted by the actions that followed the release, aimed at glorifying this hideous crime, to the reconciliation efforts with Azerbaijan and we are also very concerned of its effects on regional stability."

==== European Court of Human Rights ====
A court case, Makuchyan and Minasyan v. Azerbaijan and Hungary, was brought in front of the European Court of Human Rights and decided upon in 2020, the final judgement placing blame on Azerbaijan for its decisions in the treatment of Safarov (mala fide acts), but largely acquitting Hungary for its part in transferring the convicted murderer to his home country (due diligence).

==== Organizations ====
- United Nations UN Secretary General Ban Ki-moon has expressed his concern over Safarov's extradition and subsequent pardon. The U.N.'s top human rights official also strongly criticized Safarov's pardon. U.N. High Commissioner for Human Rights Navi Pillay's spokesman, Rupert Colville, told reporters Friday in Geneva that "ethnically motivated hate crimes of this gravity should be deplored and properly punished – not publicly glorified by leaders and politicians... We are also in full agreement with the Co-Chairs of the OSCE Minsk Group who earlier this week expressed deep concern about “the damage the pardon and any attempts to glorify the crime have done to the [Nagorno-Karabakh] peace process and trust between the two sides.""
- European Union: EU Foreign Affairs Representative Catherine Ashton and European Commissioner for Enlargement and European Neighbourhood Policy Štefan Füle announced that they are "concerned by the news that the President of Azerbaijan has pardoned Azerbaijani army officer Ramil Safarov". They called on Azerbaijan and Armenia "to exercise restraint, on the ground as well as in public statements, in order to prevent an escalation of the situation in the interest of regional stability and on-going efforts towards reconciliation". The EU foreign relations spokeswoman, Maja Kocjanic, told press in Brussels: "We are particularly concerned with the impact the developments might have on the wider region."

- European Parliament passed a resolution on the Ramil Safarov case, stating that it “deplores the decision by the President of Azerbaijan to pardon Ramil Safarov”, "the hero’s welcome accorded to Mr Safarov in Azerbaijan and the decision to promote him to the rank of major…” as well as expresses a “concern about the example this sets for future generations and about the promotion and recognition he has received from the Azerbaijani state”. As for the legitimacy of Aliyev’s pardon the European Parliament "Considers that, while the presidential pardon granted to Mr Safarov complies with the letter of the Convention on the Transfer of Sentenced Persons, it runs contrary to the spirit of that international agreement, which was negotiated to allow the transfer of a person convicted on the territory of one state to serve the remainder of his or her sentence on the territory of another state”.

- Collective Security Treaty Organisation: Secretary-General Nikolay Bordyuzha stated that Azerbaijan's decision to pardon Safarov is against international law. He then continued, "this move was obviously done for the sake of short-term political goals and can not be justified by anything".
- OSCE Minsk Group: The OSCE Minsk Group (composed of negotiators from the US, Russia and France to encourage a peaceful, negotiated resolution to the conflict between Azerbaijan and Armenia over Nagorno-Karabakh) stated that Azerbaijan's pardoning of a military officer who murdered an Armenian officer has harmed attempts to establish peace between the countries.
- NATO: NATO likewise condemned Safarov's pardon. NATO Secretary General Fogh Rasmussen expressed his "deep concern" and stated that "The act [Safarov] committed in 2004 was a terrible crime that should not be glorified. The pardon damages trust and does not contribute to the peace process."
- Council of Europe: "Honouring a convicted murderer and transforming him into a hero is unacceptable", Secretary General Thorbjørn Jagland has declared. Human rights commissioner Nils Muižnieks and Jean-Claude Mignon, President of the Parliamentary Assembly, also expressed their outrage at the pardon.

==== Non-governmental organizations ====
Amnesty International human rights organization issued a public statement on the occasion of Safarov's release, which stated, "By pardoning and then promoting Ramil Safarov, President Aliyev has signalled to Azerbaijanis that violence against Armenians is not only acceptable, but rewarded. The Azerbaijani government should rescind any privileges awarded to Safarov and publicly condemn ethnic violence."

British expert on Caucasus Thomas de Waal called President Aliyev's move to pardon Safarov "deeply provocative." In De Waal's view, "This is now a full-blown state-to-state row, with as yet unknowable consequences."

Azerbaijan

Mixed thoughts came from Azerbaijani organizations and figures in Azerbaijani society. Zardusht Alizadeh, chair of the Open Society Institute in Azerbaijan, condemned the act of pardon, saying it would not contribute positively to the peaceful solution of the Nagorno-Karabakh conflict. According to Alizadeh, the act was not based on any political will, respect of law or interest in conflict resolution, but instead had only "cheap fame" to it. The noted journalist Khadija Ismayilova, Radio Liberty's lead correspondent in Azerbaijan, commented that what Safarov had done was "awful" and the reaction of seeing him as a hero "happens when society is not allowed to do anything. They are angry. People of Azerbaijan lost the war, lost the territory to occupants, became refugees, lost their siblings including civilians and they were stopped and banned from restoring justice on the battle field." on her Facebook account.

Former deputy of the Azerbaijan National Assembly and writer Akram Aylisli refused to comment on the "campaign," but did note that he had his "own ideas of and approach to heroism." Azerbaijani media have criticized the United States' concern for Safarov's pardon and added that it should have reacted the same way when Varoujan Garabedian, a member of ASALA and the perpetrator of 1983 Orly Airport attack who was imprisoned in France, was expelled to Armenia after his pardon by France in 2001. Meanwhile, the organization Azerbaijani Americans for Democracy sent an open letter to Secretary of State Hillary Clinton, urging the United States to devote more of its attention to the human rights abuses of President Aliyev, instead of Safarov's pardon.

The leading Azerbaijani Russian-language news website Day.az called on its readers to edit the Russian Wikipedia article on Safarov to prevent it from the possible "revenge of Armenian nationalists."

Hungary

Péter Erdő, the Archbishop of Esztergom-Budapest and the Hungarian Cardinal of the Roman Catholic Church, in a letter to Catholicos of All Armenians Karekin II, issued a statement expressing "full solidarity with the Armenian Christians and with the Armenian people that has so much suffered in the past."

In October 2012 four Hungarian intellectuals—historian and political analyst Zoltán Bíró, rector of the John Wesley Theological College Gábor Iványi, journalist/publicist Gábor Deák and writer Rudolf Ungváry—arrived in Armenia to apologize for the extradition of Ramil Safarov. During the press conference in Yerevan they stated: “We organized the journey to inform of most of Hungarian people’s disagreement, and our discontent with the authorities’ decision to transfer a sleeping officer’s assassin back to his homeland." Mr. Iványi said, “We have come to express our regret and shame. Hungary didn’t even officially recognize the Armenian genocide as the country was in need of Turkish support then. As for the prime minister having allowed for the extradition, he would have resigned his post”.

Hungarian scientist and expert in Armenian studies Benedek Zsigmond joined in the protest organized by many NGOs in Hungary against the decision of Safarov's extradition and made a public statement of apology for the Hungarian government's action. On his Facebook page he wrote "Today I feel ashamed that I am Hungarian. I apologize to all Armenians... Today is the black day in the recent history of Hungary." He also personally apologized during his visit to Armenia calling the extradition an "unacceptable, amoral act".

On 4 September 2012, a demonstration took place in front of the Hungarian Parliament Building in Kossuth Square. It was reported that about two thousand Hungarians protested against their government's actions.

In September, the Kispest district of Budapest had a new square named after Kemal Atatürk and a statue of him was revealed among protests from local Armenians and Greeks who considered it a provocation. In the months preceding the ceremony the local government was pondering the matter, being caught between the resentment of minority groups and the will to preserve good relations with its sister city Pendik, whose representatives have already been invited to the ceremony. Only two days after its unveiling, the statue was vandalized by red paint being poured over it. The statue has been restored since.

Armenian diaspora

In many cities around the world where Armenian diaspora is present, demonstrations took place against Hungarian and Azerbaijani government actions, including New York City, Ottawa, Tbilisi, Rostov-on-Don, and Nicosia.

A year after Safarov had been extradited, the Armenian community in Hungary claimed that they did not feel safe and that their relationship with the Hungarian government was getting worse every day, as the authorities were making their lives there "more difficult".

== See also ==
- Anti-Armenian sentiment in Azerbaijan
- Armenia–Azerbaijan relations
