= Mária Gerzsány =

Hungarian serial killer (1851–1928)

- Born: March 25, 1851; Kiskunmajsa, Kingdom of Hungary
- Died: December 30, 1928 (aged 77); Márianosztra, Kingdom of Hungary
- Convictions: Murder x3 Complicity to murder
- Penalty: Life imprisonment

Details
- Victims: 3–50+
- Span of crimes: 1905 – 1911 (known)
- Country: Hungary
- State: Csongrád
- Date apprehended: July 24, 1911

Mária Gerzsány (March 25, 1851 – December 30, 1928) was a serial killer in Austria-Hungary responsible for poisoning at least three people with arsenic in Kistelek between 1905 and 1911. She was sentenced to life imprisonment for these murders, but it is presumed that she may have been responsible for more, selling her poisons to people who wished to get rid of unwanted relatives.

== Activities ==
Mária Gerzsány was born to a Catholic peasant family in Kiskunmajsa in 1851. In an era without social security, she worked as a midwife, helping local women give birth. A later investigation by the gendarmes in Kistelek revealed that she had aided with 95 births, of which a reported 78 were reported deceased, but it was unclear whether they'd been murdered. Aside from performing abortions, Gerzsány was also suspected of prostituting and trafficking girls, but despite being prosecuted in over a dozen cases, she was never convicted. At the time of the murders, she lived with shoemaker Antal Török on Szegedi Street in Kistelek, where she advertised herself as a midwife.

Gerzsány had five recorded marriages, all of which were described as "wild". Her ex-husbands (of whom only two survived) all died in similar circumstances, having been issued life insurance policies by Gerzsány, who was the sole beneficiary.

In 1905, Gerzsány lived with a common-law husband, a farmer named Ferenc Laczkó, for whom she took a life insurance policy worth 340 korona. Shortly after, the healthy peasant fell ill in December, dying on the 11th. After an autopsy was performed, the cause of death was determined to be arsenic poisoning. Following a testimony in a later trial, Gerzsány admitted to producing, selling and administering arsenic concoctions to whoever wanted to buy it, in order to get rid of relatives. Proving any such cases proved to be a difficult task, as neither the surviving victims or their family members wished to cooperate about the suspicious deaths, and their testimonies often proved inaccurate or contradictory. In an effort to prevent her activities, gendarmes imposed higher fines on Gerzsány between 1909 and 1910.

== Arrest ==
In June 1911, Mária Gerzsány offered her services to a Mrs. Palinkás, who complained a lot about her husband, offering to provide arsenic in exchange for 60 korona. Palinkás refused, and instead informed the gendarmes in Kistelek, who were already keeping tabs on the suspicious old woman. They asked Palinkás to help them, providing her with marked money, which she gave to Gerzsány in exchange for the promised arsenic. A few days later, Gerzsány came across Palinkás again, offering to give her a stronger poison for an additional six korona, to which the latter agreed. This information was relayed to the gendarmes, and on July 24, 1911, Mária Gerzsány was arrested. While examining her home, the gendarmes found the marked korona paid for the poison provided by Palinkás. Upon further searching, they uncovered numerous ointments, powders, poisons, tweezers, pliers and all kinds of instruments.

== Trial, imprisonment and death ==
Following Gerzsány's arrest, the gendarmes started exhuming bodies from the Kistelek cemetery. Despite claims from outraged villagers of the possible death toll exceeding 50 people, the authorities were unable to investigate all of them. Instead, they examined the bodies of six potential victims: two of Gerzsány's husbands, Mátyas Fülöp and Ferenc Laczkó, who died in 1898 and 1905, respectively; landscaper József Lévai, who died on September 13, 1908; farmer György Sisák, who died in January 1909; and widow Károly Farkas, who died in March 1910, all of whom had traces of arsenic in them. Several witnesses were summoned to the trial, claiming that they had been offered arsenic by Gerzsány, who rejected all the accusations, saying that she had feuded with the witnesses and they were taking it out on her. The evidence against her overwhelmed her claims, however, and in turn, Mária Gerzsány was sentenced to life imprisonment for murder and complicity in murder, and sent to serve her sentence at the Márianosztra prison in 1912. Mrs. Sisák was convicted as an accomplice in her husband's murder and sentenced to 15 years imprisonment. Two years later, it was revealed that she had benefitted with a 4,600 korona life insurance policy after the death of her brother Imre, who had been poisoned by his wife, but wasn't prosecuted for that case.

Gerzsány spent the next seven years in prison in a cell with another infamous contemporary criminal, Verona Fekete, and was released following Hungary's defeat at the hands of the Soviet Union during World War I. She then returned home to Kistelek, where it was rumored that she renewed her business of selling arsenic, and she'd even been commissioned by a woman who wanted to poison her husband. These allegations eventually reached the police, who were afraid of letting such a dangerous criminal run loose, and on March 19, 1920, Gerzsány was rearrested and transported to the prison in Márianosztra to finish her life sentence, where she died due to old age.

== See also ==
- List of serial killers by country
