= Ashiq Peri =

Azerbaijani folk poet (c. 1811 – c. 1848)

- Born: c. 1811; Maralyan, Karabakh Khanate
- Died: c. 1848 (aged 36–37)
- Occupation: Ashiq
- Writing career
- Language: Azerbaijani

Ashiq Peri (Azerbaijani: Aşıq Pəri, عاشیق پری; c. 1811 – c. 1848) was a 19th-century ashiq (folk poet), regarded as the first prominent female Azerbaijani ashiq. Her poetry primarily consisted of verbal poetic duels, where she used various folk forms in Azerbaijani. Born in 1811 in the village of Maralyan in the Karabakh Khanate (now in the Jabrayil District of Azerbaijan), she began writing poetry as a child and later moved to Shusha, the capital of the Karabakh Khanate. She often participated in local poetry contests, competing against and defeating her male counterparts, and eventually becoming the first renowned female ashiq in the region. She died young under unknown circumstances.

The main themes in Peri's work are love, the objection to injustices, and the expression of suffering and longing. She employs simple and direct language in her poetry. Being the only female in her artistic collective, she often adopted a playful, mocking tone towards her fellow collective members and conveyed an impression of command and competence. Her poetry is notable for its spirited defence of her independence, using the established structure of the ashiq verbal contest to broaden her expressive potential as a woman. She has been described as "a model of a strong, independent woman from within Azerbaijani culture" because, in her duels with male counterparts, she rebuffed their advances while maintaining her honour and modesty, always performing solo without requiring a man's guardianship.

== Biography ==
Little is known about the life of Ashiq Peri. The majority of the information available comes from the observations of the Russian orientalist historian Adolf Berge who journeyed across the Caucasus for an anthropological investigation in the early 1800s and met Peri. Her real name and precise date of birth remain unknown, but based on Berge's estimation that she was 18 years old in 1829, it is estimated that she was born in 1811. She used the pen name Peri (lit. 'Fairy') in her works. Peri was born and raised in Maralyan, a village in the Karabakh Khanate, now located in Azerbaijan's Jabrayil District. She received her education there and began writing poetry as a child. Some sources suggest that she was apprenticed to Mahammad Bey Ashiq, a famous ashiq (folk poet) of her time.

She began participating in local poetry contests, often competing against and defeating her male counterparts. Eventually, she became the first renowned female ashiq in the region. In 1830, she moved to Shusha, the capital of the Karabakh Khanate, where her reputation continued to grow. She remained unmarried and expressed in her poetry that her life "came to an end with the death of her lover". She died young under unknown circumstances. According to Anna C. Oldfield, a professor of world literature, the majority of references indicate that Peri died in 1848, but do not provide any details on the cause or circumstances of her death. However, some references list her year of death as 1835.

== Poetry ==
Peri is known to have authored between 40 and 50 poems, but the majority of them have been lost. Her poetry primarily consisted of verbal poetic duels, which were transcribed by spectators, preserving an account of the live performances. These duels took place within an artistic collective known as a mejlis. Peri belonged to the Vagif mejlis, named after Molla Panah Vagif, a poet and statesman from the Karabakh Khanate who played a key role in establishing Azerbaijani ashiq poetry as a recognised literary genre. The Vagif mejlis, like Vagif himself, was known for composing and reciting verse in Azerbaijani, in contrast to most Azerbaijani poetry from the 19th century, which was associated with the city elites and written in Persian. Oldfield suggests that this was indicative of a "rising Azerbaijani national consciousness", with Peri being "among those who championed her native language and poetic traditions". Peri used folk forms such as gəraylı (stanzas with four lines of eight syllables each) and qoşma (stanzas with four lines of eleven syllables each) in her poetry, which predominantly explores the theme of love, with its pains and challenges. She frequently alludes to romantic love in her verses, often embracing her femininity, while also reflecting a deep Shia Muslim faith. Another common theme in her poetry is objection to injustice, as well as the expression of suffering and longing. Though she uses simple and direct language, her poems demonstrate a thorough understanding of both folk and high-culture poetic motifs.

Peri was the only female member of her mejlis. Her poetry is characterised by its wit and playfulness, often adopting a mocking tone towards her fellow mejlis members and conveying an impression of command and competence. Oldfield likens her to an "older sister" to other mejlis members, though she notes that Peri "would have been younger than all of them". Other ashiqs dedicated many poems to her, highlighting the prominent role she must have occupied in the mejlis. Her poetry is notable for its spirited defence of her independence, using the established structure of the ashiq verbal contest to broaden her expressive potential as a woman. In her poetic exchanges with male members of the mejlis, she upholds her honour, rebuffs their advances, and maintains her modesty.

== Legacy ==
Tuğba Bayraktarlar, a modern scholar of Turkish literature, describes Peri as one of the most significant representatives of ashiq poetry in the 19th century. Her poetry helped spread women's literature not only in her home region of Karabakh, but throughout modern-day Azerbaijan. Peri is also regarded as the first prominent female Azerbaijani ashiq, and her legacy continues to this day. In 1984, the first association of female ashiqs and poets was established in the Azerbaijan Soviet Socialist Republic and it was named Aşıq Pəri Məclisi (lit. 'mejlis of Ashiq Peri') in her honour. The association brings together over 100 female poets. Oldfield describes Peri as "a model of a strong, independent woman from within Azerbaijani culture" because she upheld her honour and modesty in her public duels with male ashiqs, asserting her dominance over the men she dueled with and performing solo without the need for a man's guardianship.
