= Lee Jeong-gyu =

Lee Jeong-gyu may refer to:

- Lee Jeong-gyu (wrestler) (born 1937), South Korean wrestler
- Yi Jeonggyu (1897–1984), Korean anarchist
