= Six Are Dead =

- Directed by: Lütfi Akad
- Written by: Lütfi Akad; Orhan Hançerlioğlu; Orhan Kemal
- Produced by: Naci Duru
- Cinematography: Aram Hugosyan
- Music by: Baki Çallıoğlu
- Production company: Duru Film
- Release date: 1953
- Country: Turkey
- Language: Turkish

Six Are Dead or The Murder of Ipsala (Turkish: Altı Ölü Var/İpsala Cinayeti) is a 1953 Turkish adventure film directed by Lütfi Akad and starring Lale Oraloğlu, Cahit Irgat and Turan Seyfioğlu.

== Cast ==
- Lale Oraloğlu as Yanola
- Cahit Irgat as Ali Rıza
- Turan Seyfioğlu as Muhittin
- Nevin Aypar as Fatma
- Şevki Artun as The butcher
- Muazzez Arçay as Zeynep
- Settar Körmükçü as Raşit
- Feridun Çölgeçen

== Bibliography ==
- Gönül Dönmez-Colin. The Routledge Dictionary of Turkish Cinema. Routledge, 2013.
