= Arthur Robertson =

Arthur Robertson may refer to:

- Arthur Robertson (athlete) (1879–1957), Scottish distance runner
- Arthur G. Robertson (1879–?), British water polo player
- Arthur Robertson (footballer) (1916–1991), Australian rules footballer for St Kilda
- Arthur Scott Robertson (1911–2000), fiddle player from Shetland
