= Mohammad Ali Khojastehpour =

Iranian wrestler (1931–2007)

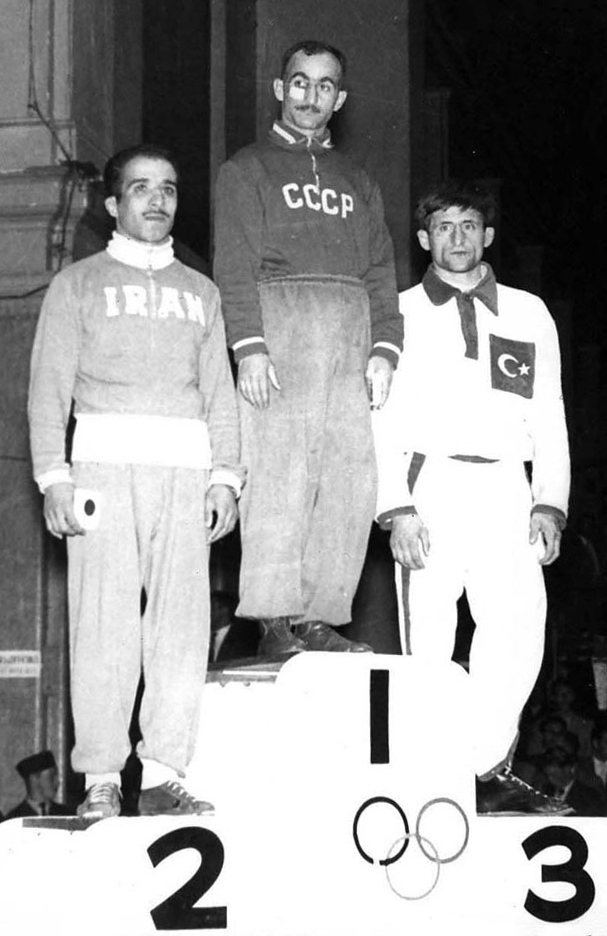
- Khojastehpour (left) at the 1956 Olympics

Personal information
- Born: 1 July 1931 Tehran, Iran
- Died: 2007 (aged approximately 76)

Sport
- Sport: Freestyle wrestling
Medal record
Representing Iran
Olympic Games
Silver medal – second place	1956 Melbourne	52 kg
World Cup
Silver medal – second place	1958 Sofia	52 kg

Mohamed Ali Khojastehpour Birang (Persian: محمدعلی خجسته‌پور بی‌رنگ; 1 July 1931 – 2007) was an Iranian flyweight freestyle wrestler. He won a silver medal at the 1956 Olympics and placed fourth at the 1959 World Championships.

Khojastehpour was born in a family of eight siblings and took up wrestling aged 14. After retiring from competitions he worked as a national wrestling coach. He died from a heart-related disease.
