= 1958 NCAA Wrestling Championships =

American collegiate wrestling tournament

Tournament information
- Sport: College wrestling
- Location: Laramie, Wyoming
- Dates: March 28th, 1958–March 29th, 1958
- Host(s): University of Wyoming

Final positions
- Champions: Oklahoma State (20th title)
- 2nd place: Iowa State
- 3rd place: Oklahoma
- MVP: Dick Delgado (Oklahoma)

The 1958 NCAA Wrestling Championships were the 28th NCAA wrestling championships to be held. University of Wyoming hosted the tournament at Laramie, Wyoming.

Oklahoma State took home the team championship with 77 points and having two individual champions

Dick Delgado of Oklahoma was named the Most Outstanding Wrestler.

== Team results ==
Rank	School	Points
1	Oklahoma State	77
2	Iowa State	62
3	Oklahoma	50
4	Michigan State	35
5	Iowa	26
6	Illinois	22
T-7	Wyoming	16
T-7	Cornell	16
9	Pittsburgh	15
T-10	Minnesota State	13
T-10	Lehigh	13

== Individual finals ==
Weight class	Championship match (champion in boldface)
115 lbs	**Dick Delgado**, Oklahoma DEC Bob Taylor, Oklahoma State, 8–3
123 lbs	**Paul Powell**, Pittsburgh DEC Bob Herald, Oklahoma State, 11–4
130 lbs	**Les Anderson**, Iowa State DEC Max Pearson, Michigan, 7–5
137 lbs	**Paul Aubrey**, Oklahoma DEC Shelby Wilson, Oklahoma State, 11–9
147 lbs	**Ron Gray**, Iowa State DEC Dick Vincent, Cornell, 6–2
157 lbs	**Dick Beattie**, Oklahoma State RD Dale Ketelsen, Iowa State, 1-1, 1-1
167 lbs	**Duane Murty**, Oklahoma State DEC Dick Ballinger, Wyoming 4–2
177 lbs	**Gary Kurdelmeier**, Iowa DEC Tim Woodin, Michigan State, 6–2
191 lbs	**Ken Maidlow**, Michigan State FALL Pete Newell, Colgate, 4:52
UNL	**Bob Norman**, Illinois DEC Gordon Roesler, Oklahoma, 5–3
