= Armenia–Hungary relations =

- Armenia: Hungary

Armenia–Hungary relations refer to bilateral relations between Armenia and Hungary. Armenia is represented in Hungary through its embassy in Vienna, Austria, and an honorary consulate in Budapest, Hungary. Hungary is represented in Armenia through its embassy in Tbilisi, Georgia, and an honorary consulate in Yerevan, Armenia. Both countries are members of the Council of Europe.

Historical relations between Armenia and Hungary date back to at least the 13th century. Diplomatic relations between the two countries commenced in 1991, following the dissolution of the Soviet bloc, and restoration of their national sovereignty.

== Background ==
Since the end of World War II, the two countries were under communist domination as both Hungary (Hungarian People's Republic) and Armenia (Armenian Soviet Socialist Republic) was a satellite state and the constituent republic of the Soviet Union respectively.

Diplomatic relations between the two nations started at the end of the Cold War, mainly with the dissolution of the Soviet Union in 1991.

There are around 15,000 people of Armenian descent living in Hungary.

== Severing of diplomatic relations ==
On 31 August 2012, Armenia severed relations with Hungary following the extradition of Ramil Safarov – convicted of murdering Armenian Lieutenant Gurgen Margaryan in Hungary in 2004. Rumors spread this was carried out in exchange for a $7 million bribe. Safarov was pardoned upon returning to Azerbaijan, and was treated as a national hero: Safarov was promoted to the military rank of major, received an apartment, and was given back pay for his 8 years of imprisonment. Relatives of the murdered officer sued Hungary and Azerbaijan for violating Articles 2 (right to life) and 14 (prohibition against discrimination) of the European Convention on Human Rights. The European Court of Human Rights recognized governments of Hungary and Azerbaijan as respondents in this case.

In Yerevan, protesters threw tomatoes at the building of Hungary's honorary consulate and tore down the flag of Hungary. The United States also criticised the decision to free Safarov. In April 2013, Armenia's acting Foreign Minister Eduard Nalbandyan said that "Armenia [was] ready to settle relations with Hungary, but Budapest should undertake steps".

== Restoration of relations ==
Diplomatic relations were restored on 2 December 2022 and now are considered as good and friendly. In February 2024, President Vahagn Khachaturyan undertook a visit to Budapest, the second visit of an Armenian president since 1989. On 7 November that year, Prime Minister Nikol Pashinyan was in Budapest for the 5th European Political Community Summit.

== Resident diplomatic missions ==
- Armenia has an embassy in Budapest.
- Hungary is accredited to Armenia from its embassy in Tbilisi, Georgia.

== See also ==
- Foreign relations of Armenia
- Foreign relations of Hungary
- Armenia-NATO relations
- Armenia-EU relations
  - Accession of Armenia to the EU
- Azerbaijan–Hungary relations
- Armenians in Hungary
