= Gergely Pongrátz =

Hungarian revolution veteran (1932–2005)

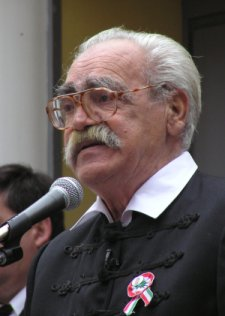
- Gergely Pongrátz speaking at the Corvin Passage in 2004.
- Born: 18 February 1932; Gherla, Kingdom of Romania
- Died: 18 May 2005 (aged 73); Kiskunmajsa, Hungary

Gergely Pongrátz (Gherla, 18 February 1932 – Kiskunmajsa, 18 May 2005) was a Hungarian revolutionary and prominent veteran of the Hungarian Revolution of 1956. He was the commander of arguably the largest and perhaps the best-known group of fighters, at the revolution's strongest and most lengthy point of resistance, Budapest's Corvin Passage (Corvin Köz); between 1 and 9 November 1956. Under his command, the Corvin Passage fighters destroyed Soviet armored vehicles, and resisted several waves of assault. Following the conflict, Pongrátz escaped capture and by 1957 had moved to the United States where he spent the majority of his exile until returning to Hungary in 1991. During his exile he was elected both Vice-Chairman and then Chairman of the Hungarian Freedom Fighters' Association (Magyar Szabadságharcos Szövetség).

== The Battle of the Corvin Passage ==
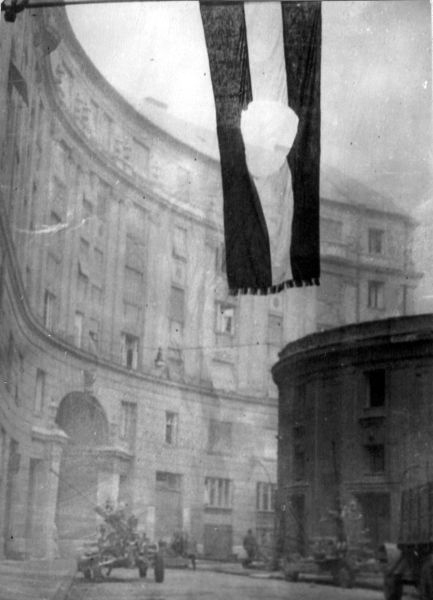
The Corvin Passage in 1956

Armed civilians in the Corvin Cinema (the cylindrical building in the foreground of the picture) and surrounding buildings began to fight with the Soviet armoured forces as early as the night of 23–4 October. Taking advantage of the area’s excellent strategic conditions, the rebels of the Corvin Passage (Corvin Köz) soon became the Uprising's biggest and most important armed revolutionary group. Their valour was a decisive factor behind the favourable turn of events on 28 October.

The Corvin fighters were initially led by László Iván Kovács, with the young and charismatic Pongrátz taking command on 1 November. (24 at the time of the conflict he was nicknamed Bajusz, meaning "moustache.") Representatives of the Corvin Passage group negotiated several times with national political and military leaders during the ceasefire, and their influence on armed groups in their neighbourhood steadily increased.

The Red Army began to attack the group in considerable strength on the evening of November 4. However, the defenders managed to hold their positions until the following afternoon, when the Soviets followed up an artillery bombardment with a further strong attack. The surrounding buildings were seriously damaged and the cinema itself caught fire.

Though they had destroyed at least a dozen Soviet Tanks, with little more than Molotov cocktails, the overwhelming force of the assault caused the group to abandon its base. Nevertheless, members of Pongrátz's Corvin Passage fighters continued their resistance as guerrillas in other parts of the city for several days. While others retreated into the cellars of the buildings until they were crushed by their enemy's superior numbers; the Communist forces having poured 31,550 troops and 1,130 tanks into Budapest.

== Politics ==
Following his return from exile in 1991, and in addition to his becoming president of the World Federation of Hungarians (Magyarok Világszövetsége), Pongrátz was a frequent and vocal critic of the successive Hungarian Socialist governments that came to power after the fall of the Iron Curtain. Despite the events of 1989, Pongrátz witnessed the democratic successor organization to the communist party of his youth continuing to be the dominant political force in Hungary.

Depressed by what he saw as the continued presence and pervasive influence of former Hungarian communists in the senior posts of government, commerce and public life; he became a leading figure in a new Hungarian nationalist movement, eventually participating in the foundation of a right-wing political party, the Movement for a Better Hungary (Jobbik Magyarországért Mozgalom).

== Museum ==
Pongrátz first founded a museum of the 1956 revolution in 1991. It was closed in 1995 after the local authorities wished to use the building for a different purpose. Pongrátz then purchased and renovated an old school building in Kiskunmajsa and turned it into the only museum of the 1956 Revolution that exists in Hungary.

== Death ==
Gergely Pongrátz died on the grounds of his museum, after suffering a heart attack. Several high-ranking state officials, including the President of the Republic of Hungary, were present at his funeral. He died a year short of the 50th anniversary of the Hungarian Revolution.

== Personal life ==
In his book Corvin Köz 1956, Pongrátz wrote that his family was not only of Transylvanian background, but also Armenian. His ancestors had lived in Szamosújvár (today Gherla, Romania) since the 14th century. In so many words, he said that although he had Armenian blood flowing through his veins, in his heart he was a Hungarian patriot. He was married and had three children - one daughter and two sons.
