= Mirian Tsalkalamanidze =

Georgian wrestler (1927–2000)

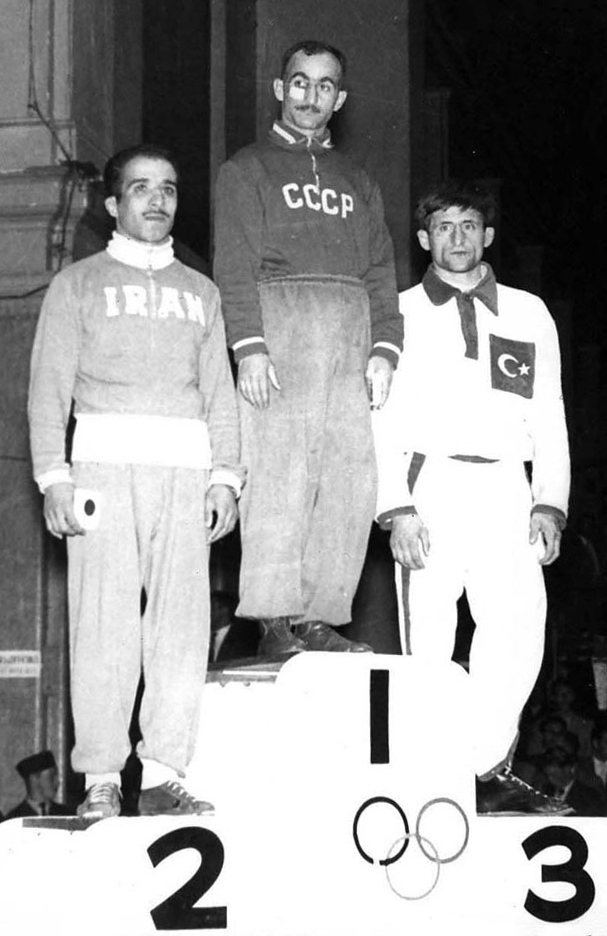
- Tsalkalamanidze (center) at the 1956 Olympics

Personal information
- Born: 20 April 1927 Kondoli, Georgian SSR, Soviet Union
- Died: 3 August 2000 (aged 73) Telavi, Georgia

Sport
- Sport: Freestyle wrestling
- Club: Spartak Tbilisi
Medal record
Men's freestyle wrestling
Representing the Soviet Union
Olympic Games
Gold medal – first place	1956 Melbourne	52 kg
World Championships
Bronze medal – third place	1954 Tokyo	52 kg
Silver medal – second place	1957 Istanbul	52 kg

Mirian Tsalkalamanidze (Georgian: მირიან ცალქალამანიძე, 20 April 1927 – 3 August 2000) was a Georgian flyweight freestyle wrestler. He competed for the Soviet Union at the 1956 Olympics and won a gold medal in the 52 kg division. At the world championships he placed third in 1954 and second in 1957.

Tsalkalamanidze initially trained in chidaoba, the Georgian traditional wrestling, and changed to freestyle wrestling only in 1951, aged 24. He won the Soviet freestyle championships in 1954 in 1956, placing third in 1955.
