= Abdul Aziz (wrestler) =

Pakistani wrestler (born 1935)

Personal information
- Nationality: Pakistani
- Born: 15 April 1935 (age 91)

Sport
- Sport: Wrestling

Abdul Aziz (born 15 April 1935) is a Pakistani wrestler. He competed in the men's freestyle flyweight at the 1956 Summer Olympics. He defeated the wrestler from Australia but lost to competitors from Korea and Turkey.
