= Basilica of Our Lady of Hungary =

Catholic church in Márianosztra, Hungary

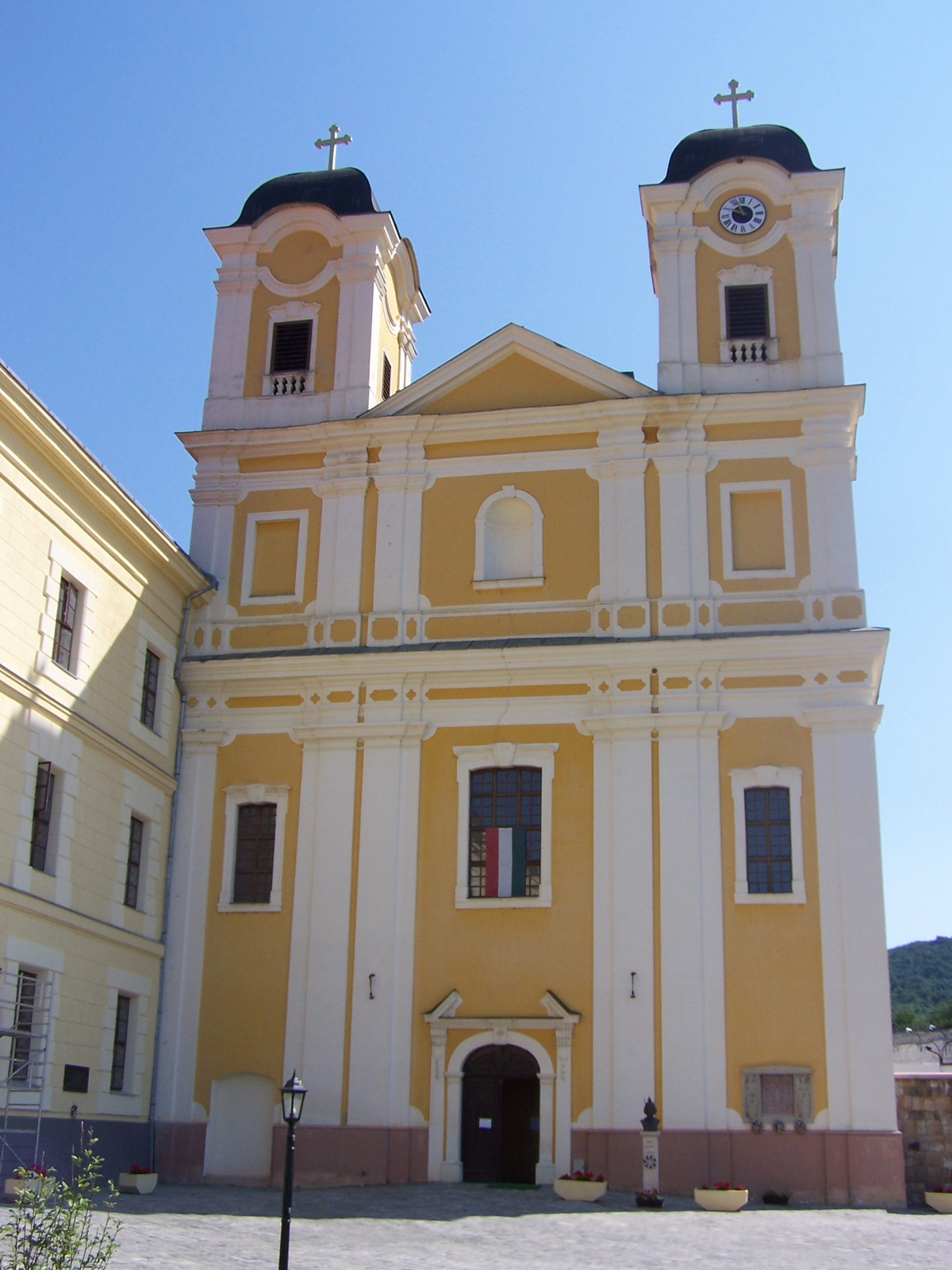
- Basilica of Our Lady of Hungary
- Location: Márianosztra, Hungary
- Denomination: Catholic Church
- Website: https://marianosztrakegyhely.hu/

Architecture
- Architect: Zsigmond Berényi
- Style: Baroque and Baroque Gothic
- Years built: 1352

The Basilica of Our Lady of Hungary (Hungarian: Magyarok Nagyasszonya-bazilika) is a Catholic parish church of the Diocese of Vác located in Márianosztra, Hungary. The former monastery church is consecrated in honor of Mary the Mother of God and has held the rank of Basilica Minor since 2012.

== Background ==
In 1352, King Louis I of Hungary built a church and a Pauline monastery in a rural area of Hungary, where his daughter Hedwig was brought up. The settlement that later developed around the monastery was named Márianosztra after the patron saint of the monastery, "Our Mary" (Latin: Maria nostra). During the time of Ottoman Hungary, the complex became a ruin. Following the defeat of the Ottomans in the Great Turkish War, the church was reconstructed in 1712 and rededicated in 1729. In 1786, the Pauline Order was dissolved and had to leave the monastery, later used as a prison, and the church was given to a newly formed parish. In 1989, the Pauline monks returned to Hungary to once again take care of this sanctuary. Once the home of the founders of the Pauline Order, it is now only the seat of the Hungarian province of the order. In 2012, the church received the rank of Basilica Minor from Pope Benedict XVI.

== Building ==
The architect of the church was Zsigmond Berényi. The sanctuary was built in a Gothicized form in 1717–1718, and the nave and towers later in 1719–1722 in Baroque style. The sanctuary was thought to be Gothic until Lajos Bozóki probed its walls in 1990 and 1999 and found that the whole sanctuary was built in the 18th century, while the true Gothic architecture ends in the 16th century. (Younger buildings in this style are regarded as forms of Gothic Revival architecture.) Art historian Gergely Domonkos Nagy explains: "The message of these medieval-like forms can easily be interpreted: the settlement of the Pauline Order in Márianosztra is not some kind of new beginning but the continuation of the medieval life of the monastery."

The organ of the church is by the Buda master János Staudinger. The Baroque furnishings, woodcarvings and sculptures were made by the Pauline artist Johannes Hasenmiller and his companions. In 1711, the church received a copy of the icon of Black Madonna of Częstochowa from the Jasna Góra Monastery.
