= Baban Daware =

Indian wrestler (born 1931)

Personal information
- Full name: Baban Dharamji Daware
- Nationality: Indian
- Born: 1931

Sport
- Sport: Wrestling

Baban Daware (born 1931) is an Indian wrestler. He competed in the men's freestyle flyweight at the 1956 Summer Olympics.
