= Fred Flannery =

Australian wrestler (1924–2012)

Personal information
- Full name: Frederick Joseph Flannery
- Nationality: Australian/Canadian
- Born: 30 March 1924 Melbourne, Australia
- Died: 8 October 2012 (aged 88)

Sport
- Sport: Wrestling
Medal record
Men's freestyle wrestling
British Empire (and Commonwealth) Games
Representing Australia
| Silver medal – second place | 1954 Vancouver | Flyweight |
Representing Canada
| Bronze medal – third place | 1958 Cardiff | Flyweight |

Frederick Joseph Flannery (30 March 1924 – 8 October 2012) was an Australian wrestler. He competed in the men's freestyle flyweight at the 1956 Summer Olympics. He represented Canada at the 1958 British Empire and Commonwealth Games.
