= Dick Delgado =

American wrestler (1931–1991)

Personal information
- Born: June 8, 1931 National City, California, U.S.
- Died: July 3, 1991 (aged 60) San Diego, California, U.S.
Medal record
Collegiate Wrestling
Representing the Oklahoma Sooners
NCAA Championships
Gold medal – first place	1957 Pittsburgh	115 lb
Gold medal – first place	1958 Laramie	115 lb
Bronze medal – third place	1956 Stillwater	115 lb

Dick Delgado (June 8, 1931 – July 3, 1991) was an American freestyle and folkstyle wrestler. He competed in the men's freestyle flyweight at the 1956 Summer Olympics. In 2011, he was inducted into the National Wrestling Hall of Fame as a Distinguished Member.
