= Zoltán Nuridsány =

Hungarian-Armenian painter

Zoltán Nuridsány (August 22, 1925, Târgu Mureş (Marosvásárhely), Romania - May 22, 1974 Debrecen, Hungary) was a Hungarian-Armenian painter.

== Biography ==
Nuridsany was born in 1925 to an Armenian father from Ani (like much of the Armenian community in Transylvania) and a Hungarian mother. His uncle, Jozef Nuridsany, was a famous chemist and professor. During his secondary school years, he became a pillar of the Fine Arts Circle of Nandor Nagy in Budapest. His supporters considered him as a member of new generation of the European School and a promising talent. In 1948, he received a grant from the Hungarian Academy of Rome. The colors and forms he used caught the attention of a number of Italian magazines and newspapers.

In Hungary he became concerned with the theory and practices of mural art. In 1949, his monumental mosaic scheme was exhibited at the MEFESZ Exhibition. His talent was recognized by Mariusz Rabinovszky and Lajos Fulep. In 1949-1950, the "Quadriga" exhibition was founded by Ferenc Janossy, Nuridsany, and others.

His well-known monumental work is "The Engineer" mosaic on the outside wall of the Engineering School in Székesfehérvár. His design won 2 awards not long before he died. In 1962, an independent exhibition was held in the Fenyes Adolf Gallery.

Nuridsany was a friend of Armenian poet Sarmen and his family. On Sarmen's invitation, he visited Soviet Armenia in 1972. His apartment in Budapest has always been a center of the Armenian culture.

In 2000, Nuridsany's exhibition was opened at the National Gallery of Armenia.

== Sources ==
- Zoltan Nuridsany
- One of the youth of the European School: Zoltán Nuridsány (1925-1974)
