= Lee Jeong-gyu (wrestler) =

South Korean wrestler

Personal information
- Nationality: South Korean
- Born: 1937 (age 88–89)

Sport
- Sport: Wrestling

Lee Jeong-gyu (born 1937) is a South Korean wrestler. He competed in the men's freestyle flyweight at the 1956 Summer Olympics.
