= Márianosztra =

Márianosztra Naßraden (in German) Márianostra (in Slovak)
- Village
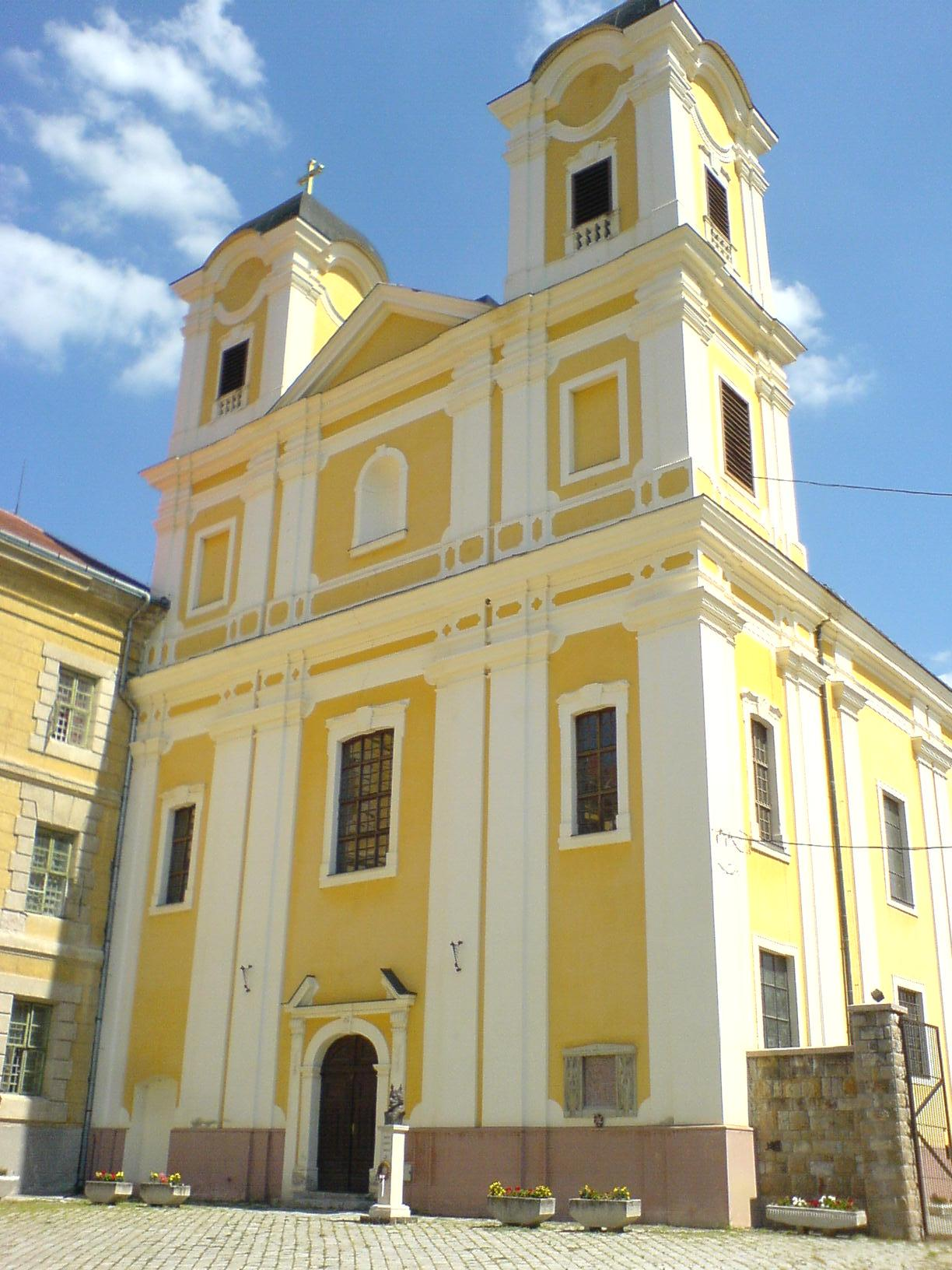

- Flag Coat of arms

- Location of Márianosztra
- Coordinates: 47°51′48.53″N 18°52′21.04″E
- Country: Hungary
- Region: Central Hungary
- County: Pest
- District: Szob

Area
  - Total: 20.26 km^{2} (7.82 sq mi)

Population (1 January 2026)
  - Total: 923
  - Density: 45.6/km^{2} (118/sq mi)
- Time zone: UTC+1 (CET)
  - Summer (DST): UTC+2 (CEST)
- Postal code: 2629
- Area code: (+36) 27
- KSH code: 04570
- Website: www.marianosztra.hu

Márianosztra is a village in Pest county, Hungary.

== Background ==
Márianosztra is home to the Pauline monastery of Márianosztra. The monastery was founded by Louis the Great in 1352. The town was built around the monastery and named after the basilica dedicated to Our Lady of Hungary, and is the name comes from the Latin term Maria Nostra (English: Our Mary)
