= Vugar Huseynov =

Azerbaijani soldier (1969–1991)

- Born: June 20, 1969; Daşkəsən, Jabrayil District, Azerbaijan
- Died: July 20, 1991 (aged 22); Goranboy District, Azerbaijan
- Military career
- Allegiance: Republic of Azerbaijan
- Conflicts: First Nagorno-Karabakh War
- Awards: National Hero of Azerbaijan; 1992

Vugar Huseynov (Azerbaijani: Vüqar Hüseynov) (20 June 1969, Dashkesan, Jabrayil District, Azerbaijan – 20 July 1991, Goranboy District, Azerbaijan) was the National Hero of Azerbaijan, and a soldier in the First Nagorno-Karabakh War.

== Life ==
Vugar Huseynov was born on 20 June 1969 in Jabrayil District of Azerbaijan. He graduated from the Secondary School in Dashkesan village of Jabrayil District. He was drafted to the military service in 1987. After completing his military service in 1989, he returned to Azerbaijan and began working as an electrician. In 1990, he applied to work in the Police Department of the Ministry of Internal Affairs and devoted his life to the frontline.

=== Personal life ===
He was single.

== Military activities ==
Vugar Huseynov participated in the battles against Armenian soldiers in Khojaly and Goranboy. He played a very important role in finding the murder of the journalist Salatyn Asgarova who was killed on her way to Shusha District.

On July 20, 1991, Armenian soldiers attacked Goranboy. Vugar Huseynov participated in the battles around Goranboy District and killed in the action.

== Memorial ==
At first, he was awarded the Order of the Red Star. Later, on June 6, 1992, Vugar Huseynov was posthumously awarded the title of "National Hero of Azerbaijan" by his decree No 831. He was buried in Dashkesan village of Jabrayil District. His secondary school is named after him.

== Sources ==
- Vugar Asgarov. Azərbaycanın Milli Qəhrəmanları (Yenidən işlənmiş II nəşr). Bakı: "Dərələyəz-M", 2010, səh. 129.
