= John Leehane (cricketer, born 1950) =

Australian cricketer (born 1950)

Personal information
- Born: 11 December 1950 (age 75); Melbourne, Australia

Domestic team information
- Years: Team
- 1978-1981: Victoria
- Source: Cricinfo, 30 November 2015

John Leehane (born 11 December 1950) is an Australian former cricketer. A specialist fast bowler, he played eleven first-class cricket matches for Victoria between 1978 and 1981. He played 111 district cricket matches for Richmond between 1972/73 and 1981/82, taking 225 wickets at 18.2.

== See also ==
- List of Victoria first-class cricketers
