= George Meikle =

Australian cricketer

Personal information
- Born: 22 October 1916; Melbourne, Australia
- Died: 25 July 1991 (aged 74); Melbourne, Australia

Domestic team information
- Years: Team
- 1938-1941: Victoria
- Source: Cricinfo, 29 November 2015

George Meikle (22 October 1916 – 25 July 1991) was an Australian cricketer. He played seven first-class cricket matches for Victoria between 1938 and 1941. A long-serving district cricket all-rounder who bowled leg spin, he played nine seasons each with North Melbourne and Melbourne, scoring 6370 career runs at 28.1 and taking 409 career wickets at 20.7.

== See also ==
- List of Victoria first-class cricketers
