= Wrestling at the 1956 Summer Olympics – Men's freestyle flyweight =

Wrestling at the Olympics

Men's freestyle flyweight at the Games of the XVI Olympiad
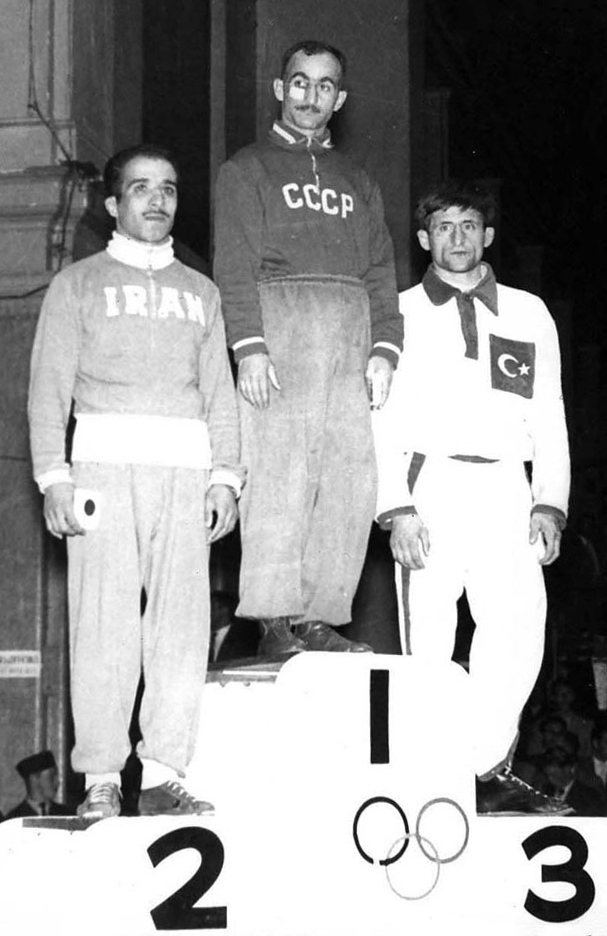
- The final podium
- Venue: Royal Exhibition Building
- Dates: 28 November–1 December 1956
- Competitors: 11 from 11 nations

Medalists
1st place, gold medalist(s)		Mirian Tsalkalamanidze	Soviet Union
2nd place, silver medalist(s)		Mohamed Ali Khojastehpour	Iran
3rd place, bronze medalist(s)		Hüseyin Akbaş	Turkey

The men's freestyle flyweight competition at the 1956 Summer Olympics in Melbourne took place from 28 November to 1 December at the Royal Exhibition Building. Nations were limited to one competitor. Flyweight was the lightest category, including wrestlers weighing up to 52 kilograms (114.6 lb).

== Competition format ==
This freestyle wrestling competition continued to use the "bad points" elimination system introduced at the 1928 Summer Olympics for Greco-Roman and at the 1932 Summer Olympics for freestyle wrestling, as modified in 1952 (adding medal rounds and making all losses worth 3 points—from 1936 to 1948 losses by split decision only cost 2). Each round featured all wrestlers pairing off and wrestling one bout (with one wrestler having a bye if there were an odd number). The loser received 3 points. The winner received 1 point if the win was by decision and 0 points if the win was by fall. At the end of each round, any wrestler with at least 5 points was eliminated. This elimination continued until the medal rounds, which began when 3 wrestlers remained. These 3 wrestlers each faced each other in a round-robin medal round (with earlier results counting, if any had wrestled another before); record within the medal round determined medals, with bad points breaking ties.

== Results ==
=== Round 1 ===
Bouts

Winner	Nation	Victory Type	Loser	Nation
Hüseyin Akbaş	Turkey	Decision, 3–0	Luigi Chinazzo	Italy
André Zoete	France	Fall	Fred Flannery	Australia
Lee Jeong-gyu	South Korea	Fall	Abdul Aziz	Pakistan
Tadashi Asai	Japan	Fall	Baban Daware	India
Mirian Tsalkalamanidze	Soviet Union	Decision, 3–0	Dick Delgado	United States
Mohamed Ali Khojastehpour	Iran	Bye	N/A	N/A

Points

Rank	Wrestler	Nation	Start	Earned	Total
1	Tadashi Asai	Japan	0	0	0
1	Mohamed Ali Khojastehpour	Iran	0	0	0
1	Lee Jeong-gyu	South Korea	0	0	0
1	André Zoete	France	0	0	0
5	Hüseyin Akbaş	Turkey	0	1	1
5	Mirian Tsalkalamanidze	Soviet Union	0	1	1
7	Abdul Aziz	Pakistan	0	3	3
7	Luigi Chinazzo	Italy	0	3	3
7	Baban Daware	India	0	3	3
7	Dick Delgado	United States	0	3	3
7	Fred Flannery	Australia	0	3	3

=== Round 2 ===
Lee withdrew after his bout.

Bouts

Winner	Nation	Victory Type	Loser	Nation
Mohamed Ali Khojastehpour	Iran	Decision, 3–0	Luigi Chinazzo	Italy
Hüseyin Akbaş	Turkey	Fall	André Zoete	France
Abdul Aziz	Pakistan	Decision, 3–0	Fred Flannery	Australia
Baban Daware	India	Decision, 3–0	Lee Jeong-gyu	South Korea
Mirian Tsalkalamanidze	Soviet Union	Decision, 2–1	Tadashi Asai	Japan
Dick Delgado	United States	Bye	N/A	N/A

Points

Rank	Wrestler	Nation	Start	Earned	Total
1	Hüseyin Akbaş	Turkey	1	0	1
1	Mohamed Ali Khojastehpour	Iran	0	1	1
3	Mirian Tsalkalamanidze	Soviet Union	1	1	2
4	Tadashi Asai	Japan	0	3	3
4	Dick Delgado	United States	3	0	3
4	André Zoete	France	0	3	3
7	Abdul Aziz	Pakistan	3	1	4
7	Baban Daware	India	3	1	4
9	Lee Jeong-gyu	South Korea	0	3	3*
10	Luigi Chinazzo	Italy	3	3	6
10	Fred Flannery	Australia	3	3	6

=== Round 3 ===
Bouts

Winner	Nation	Victory Type	Loser	Nation
Mohamed Ali Khojastehpour	Iran	Decision, 3–0	Dick Delgado	United States
Hüseyin Akbaş	Turkey	Fall	Abdul Aziz	Pakistan
Tadashi Asai	Japan	Decision, 3–0	André Zoete	France
Mirian Tsalkalamanidze	Soviet Union	Fall	Baban Daware	India

Points

Rank	Wrestler	Nation	Start	Earned	Total
1	Hüseyin Akbaş	Turkey	1	0	1
2	Mohamed Ali Khojastehpour	Iran	0	1	2
2	Mirian Tsalkalamanidze	Soviet Union	2	0	2
4	Tadashi Asai	Japan	3	1	4
5	Dick Delgado	United States	3	3	6
5	André Zoete	France	3	3	6
7	Abdul Aziz	Pakistan	4	3	7
7	Baban Daware	India	4	3	7

=== Round 4 ===
Bouts

Winner	Nation	Victory Type	Loser	Nation
Mohamed Ali Khojastehpour	Iran	Decision, 3–0	Tadashi Asai	Japan
Hüseyin Akbaş	Turkey	Decision, 3–0	Mirian Tsalkalamanidze	Soviet Union

Points

Rank	Wrestler	Nation	Start	Earned	Total
1	Hüseyin Akbaş	Turkey	1	1	2
2	Mohamed Ali Khojastehpour	Iran	2	1	3
3	Mirian Tsalkalamanidze	Soviet Union	2	3	5
4	Tadashi Asai	Japan	4	3	7

=== Medal rounds ===
Akbaş's victory over Tsalkalamanidze in round 4 counted for the medal rounds. Each wrestler went 1–1 against the other medalists, but Tsalkalamanidze received the gold medal since he had the only win by fall. Of the remaining two competitors, Khojastehpour had defeated Akbaş head-to-head and so took silver.

Bouts

Winner	Nation	Victory Type	Loser	Nation
Mohamed Ali Khojastehpour	Iran	Decision, 3–0	Hüseyin Akbaş	Turkey
Mirian Tsalkalamanidze	Soviet Union	Fall	Mohamed Ali Khojastehpour	Iran

Points

Rank	Wrestler	Nation	Wins	Losses	Points
1st place, gold medalist(s)	Mirian Tsalkalamanidze	Soviet Union	1	1	3
2nd place, silver medalist(s)	Mohamed Ali Khojastehpour	Iran	1	1	4
3rd place, bronze medalist(s)	Hüseyin Akbaş	Turkey	1	1	4
