= Alan Oakley (journalist) =

Alan Oakley is an English-born Australian journalist.

Oakley worked as a journalist for the London Daily Express, before emigrating to Australia in 1985, to work for the Sydney Daily Telegraph. He later edited the Herald Sun in Melbourne, and The Sunday Telegraph in Sydney, before working as a media and public relations consultant at Buchan Consulting in Melbourne. Oakley later became editor-in-chief and publisher of Newcastle Newspapers (overseeing publications including The Newcastle Herald, The Newcastle Post group and The Central Coast Sun Weekly) and Melbourne's Sunday Age.

He was editor of The Sydney Morning Herald from September 2005 until December 2008. In March 2009 he joined News Limited in the role of national editor, features.
