= Battle of the Corvin Passage =

Battle of the Hungarian Revolution of 1956

- Part of Hungarian Revolution of 1956
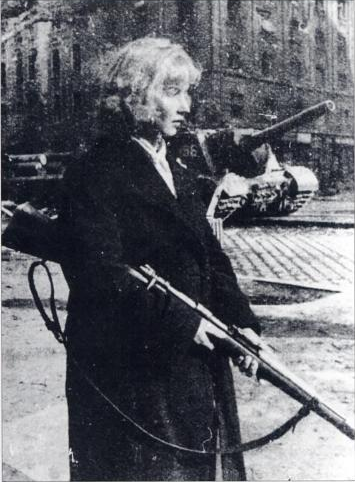
- A woman holding an old bolt action M91/30 rifle and the massive ISU-152s knocked out by her group. She appears in several photos of the Corvin Passage fighters. She is wearing a dark civilian overcoat possibly with a red-white-green ribbon on the left lapel (Hungarian State Security Archives ÁBTL 4.1, album A-2377/195)
Date	24 – 29 October 1956 (first phase) 4 – 9 November 1956 (second phase)
Location	Budapest, Hungary
Result	Hungarian Victory (October 24); Soviet Victory (November 9)

Belligerents
Hungarian Revolutionaries	Soviet Union

Commanders and leaders
László Iván Kovács (October 24 – November 1st) Gergely Pongrátz (November 1–9) (Note: Though these were the main leaders of the Battle, other's from nearby streets frequently collaborated with the two commanders)	Gennady Ivanovich Obaturov

Strength
1,400–4,000 men 40 guns	Unknown

Casualties and losses
Unknown	Unknown est. 12 tanks

The Battle of the Corvin Passage (Hungarian: Corvin közi csata) was fought in the Hungarian Revolution of 1956. It proved to be one of the most important battlegrounds during the war. A statue can be found at Corvin köz, near Corvin–negyed (Budapest Metro), to mark this important event in the Hungarian Revolution of 1956. The battle is known for starting the career of Gergely Pongrátz, founder of Jobbik.

== Prelude ==
Due to a lack of jobs, declining quality of life, and the failure of the Hungarian economy, an uprising occurred on October 23, 1956. The Corvin Passage was immediately recognized by the rebels as a strategic location due to its importance as a traffic junction, and its strategic value near the Kilian Barracks and the Budapest Radio Station. The Passage also provided a good defense point, with narrow streets that limited the movement of larger vehicles such as tanks and trucks.

== Early battle ==
László Iván Kovács is said to have first fought at the Corvin Passage in October during the early stages of the Hungarian Revolution (1956). He first began demonstrating outside of a radio station and later that day used a gun on Üllői Avenue to fight against Soviet tanks. On October 26, he joined other armed revolutionaries in Corvin where he eventually became the leader of a unit of 1,000. It was here that he set up his base in Corvin's resident cinema where his successor, Gergely, also set up command.

The soldiers at Corvin had already resisted a Soviet offensive on October 24 and the Soviets were later defeated, suffering heavy casualties. The Soviet strategy then was to gather intelligence and attack with a renewed offensive on October 28. To direct the offensive the Soviets appointed the leader of the 33rd Guards Mechanized Division, Gennady Ivanovich Obaturov who had taken part in the Budapest offensive during 1944. However, over reliance on heavy artillery, poor intelligence and insufficient planning resulted in the failure of the offensive. On October 29, the Soviets withdrew from the city until October 31. Despite his successes as a commander, after November 1, László was replaced with Gergely for unknown reasons who continued the defense of the passage until November 9.

== Under Gergely Pongrátz ==
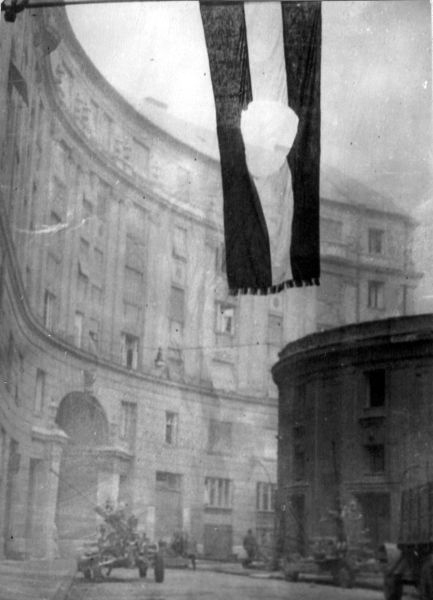
On the third floor of the circular structure in this picture is where the cinema where László set up his command is located

Nicknamed 'Bajusz' for his 'Twirly' mustache, Gergely Pongrátz fought in less harmonious circumstances than his predecessor. Though he commanded 4,000 militia compared to his predecessors 1,000, he still had to contend with a renewed Soviet offensive which had turned back toward the city and attacked on November 5. His soldiers fought from the windows of buildings, destroying Soviet tanks with makeshift Molotovs. With these tactics, Gergely gained a degree of success destroying a reported 12 tanks and inflicting heavy casualties on the Soviets. However, under heavy Soviet artillery and mortar fire, the defense of the passage became steadily more difficult and with the desertion of 300 troops on November 6, the defense became more and more difficult until fighting against the Soviets became solely guerrilla. Then on November 9, Gergely's forces were defeated and he fled to Austria, alongside many of other Hungarian revolutionaries. He would remain in exile until 1991. (Note: It is disputed whether or not Gergely was one of the 300 who fled to Austria.)
