= Daşkəsən, Jabrayil =

Daşkəsən
- Location within Azerbaijan
- Coordinates: 39°25′37″N 47°06′27″E
- Country: Azerbaijan
- Rayon: Jabrayil

Population
  - Total: 0
- Time zone: UTC+4 (AZT)
  - Summer (DST): UTC+5 (AZT)

Daşkəsən (also, Daşgəsən, Dashkesan) is a village in the Jabrayil Rayon of Azerbaijan. It is currently uninhabited.

== Notable natives ==
- Vugar Huseynov — National Hero of Azerbaijan.
