= Kiskunmajsa =

- Town
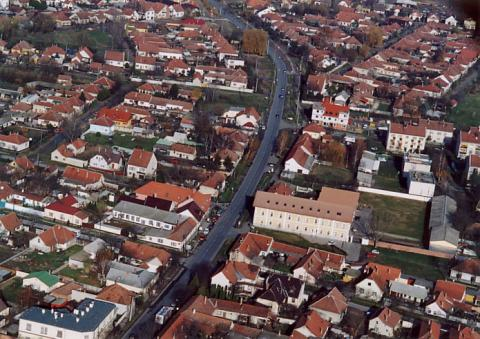
- Aerial photograph of Kiskunmajsa

- Flag Coat of arms

- Location of Kiskunmajsa
- Coordinates: 46.49231°N 19.73683°E
- Country: Hungary
- County: Bács-Kiskun
- District: Kiskunmajsa

Area
  - Total: 221.99 km^{2} (85.71 sq mi)

Population (2009)
  - Total: 11,707
  - Density: 53.5/km^{2} (139/sq mi)
- Time zone: UTC+1 (CET)
  - Summer (DST): UTC+2 (CEST)
- Postal code: 6120
- Area code: (+36) 77
- Website: www.kiskunmajsa.hu

Kiskunmajsa is a town in the Kiskunmajsa district of Bács-Kiskun county, Hungary.

== Twin towns – sister cities ==
Kiskunmajsa is twinned with:

- Bačka Topola, Serbia
- Bad Schönborn, Germany
- Baiyin, China
- Gheorgheni, Romania
- Lommatzsch, Germany
- Lubliniec, Poland
- Ukmergė, Lithuania

== Gallery ==
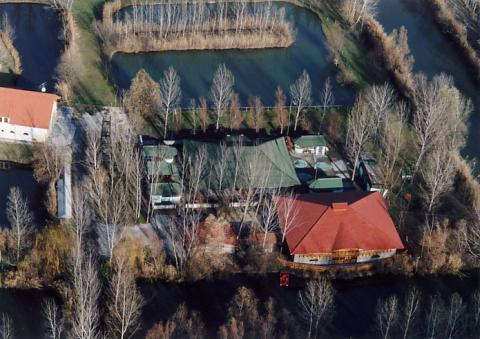

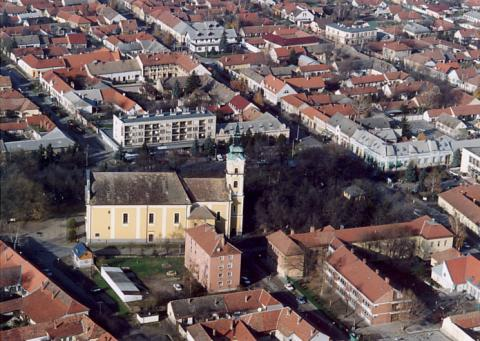

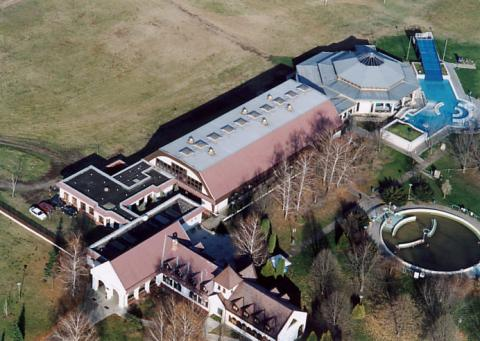
