= John Leehane (cricketer, born 1921) =

Australian cricketer

Personal information
- Born: 21 October 1921; Melbourne, Australia
- Died: 22 July 1991 (aged 69); Melbourne, Australia

Domestic team information
- Years: Team
- 1950: Victoria
- Source: Cricinfo, 30 November 2015

John Leehane (20 October 1921 – 22 July 1991) was an Australian cricketer. A specialist fast bowler, he played one first-class cricket match for Victoria in 1950. He played 86 district cricket First XI matches for Carlton between 1945/46 and 1952/53, taking 176 wickets at 18.6.

== See also ==
- List of Victoria first-class cricketers
