= Karxulu =

Karkhulu Karxulu
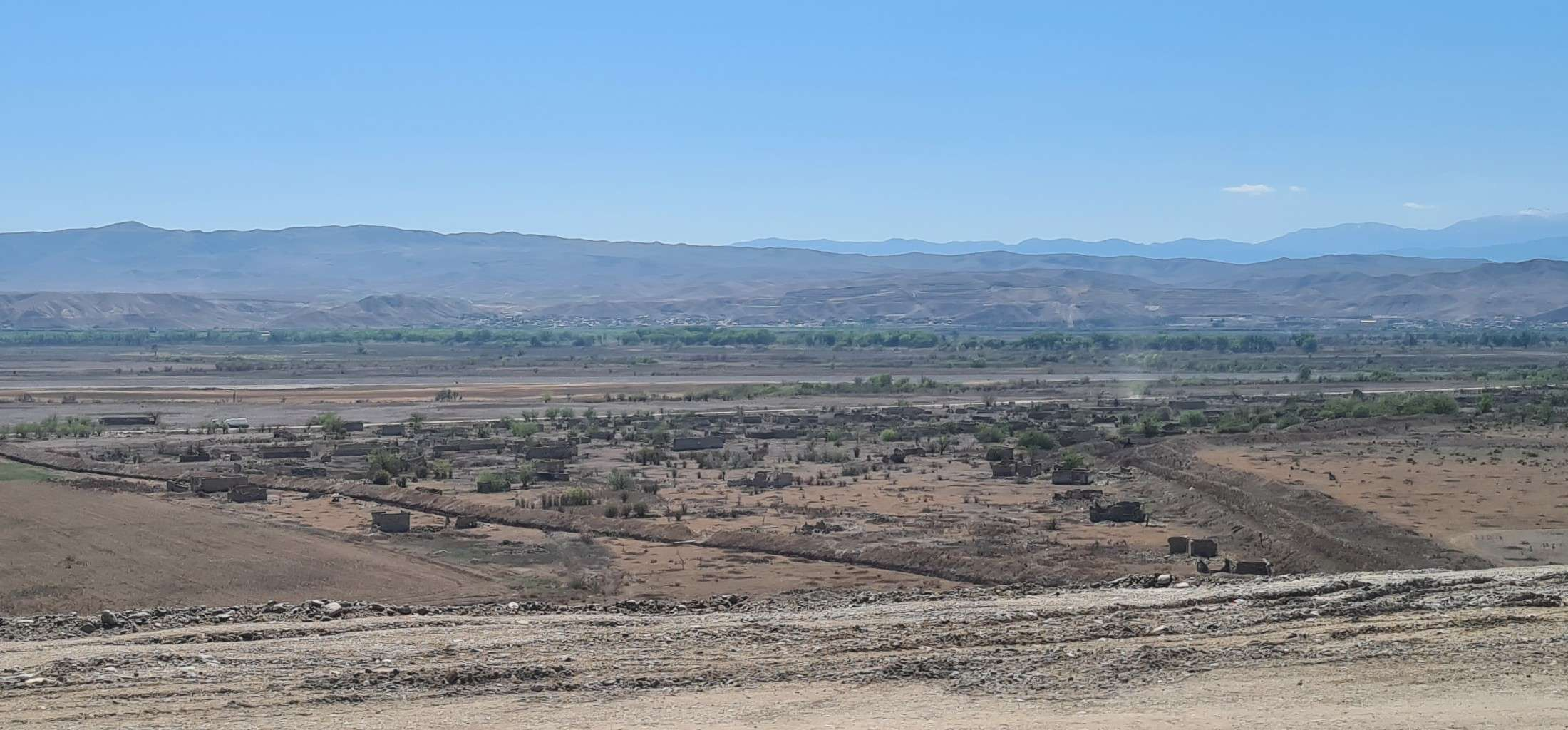
- Karkhulu village in April 2023

- Location within Azerbaijan
- Coordinates: 39°20′40″N 47°11′42″E
- Country: Azerbaijan
- Rayon: Jabrayil

Population
  - Total: 0
- Time zone: UTC+4 (AZT)
  - Summer (DST): UTC+5 (AZT)

Karkhulu (Azerbaijani: Karxulu) is a village in the Jabrayil Rayon of Azerbaijan. It's currently uninhabited.
