= Arthur Robertson (footballer) =

Australian rules footballer

Personal information
- Full name: Arthur James Robertson
- Born: 25 May 1916; Murrumbeena, Victoria
- Died: 2 July 1991 (aged 75); Melbourne
- Original team: Murrumbeena Amateurs
- Height: 183 cm (6 ft 0 in)
- Weight: 85 kg (187 lb)
- Position: Fullback

Playing career^{1}
Years	Club	Games (Goals)
1936–1942	St Kilda	74 (3)
1940	Shepparton	unknown
1947–1952	Sorrento	68 (unknown)
- ^{1} Playing statistics correct to the end of 1942.

Career highlights
- 1947 playing coach

Arthur James Robertson (25 May 1916 – 2 July 1991) was an Australian rules footballer who played for the St Kilda Football Club in the Victorian Football League (VFL).

He later served in the Royal Australian Air Force during World War II.
