= Dəcəl =

- Location within Azerbaijan
- Coordinates: 39°20′46″N 47°08′57″E
- Country: Azerbaijan
- Rayon: Jabrayil
- Time zone: UTC+4 (AZT)
  - Summer (DST): UTC+5 (AZT)

Dəcəl (also, Dəjəl, Dazhal, and Dezhal) is a village in the Jabrayil Rayon of Azerbaijan.
