= Allan Oakley =

Australian rules footballer, born 1907

Personal information
- Full name: Alan Spencer Oakley
- Born: 7 January 1907; Clifton Hill, Victoria
- Died: 21 July 1991 (aged 84)
- Height: 173 cm (5 ft 8 in)
- Weight: 73 kg (161 lb)

Playing career^{1}
Years	Club	Games (Goals)
1928–1931	Richmond	39 (24)
- ^{1} Playing statistics correct to the end of 1931.

Alan Spencer Oakley (7 January 1907 – 21 July 1991) was an Australian rules footballer who played for the Richmond Football Club in the Victorian Football League (VFL).

== Military service ==
Oakley later served in the Australian Army during World War II.
