= Orhan Hançerlioğlu =

Turkish writer (1916–1991)

- Born: 19 August 1916; Istanbul
- Died: 9 July 1991 (aged 74); Istanbul
- Resting place: Zincirlikuyu Cemetery
- Education: Istanbul University
- Occupations: Writer, researcher, philosopher
- Writing career
- Language: Turkish
- Period: 1936–1988
- Notable works: Felsefe Ansiklopedisi, Düşünce Tarihi, Ali (novel)
- Notable awards: 1956 Turkish Language Institution Novel Award (with Ali novel); 1949 Şadırvan Magazine Best Story

Orhan Hançerlioğlu (19 August 1916, Istanbul – 9 July 1991, Istanbul) was a Turkish writer.

== Biography ==
Orhan Bali Hançerlioğlu was born in Kırkkilise (Kırklareli). His father, Zahid Bey, is a merchant; His mother, Mrs. Sehavet, is a housewife. In the 1923–1924 academic year, he was accepted to the nursery section of Şişli Terakki High School and started the first school section on February 16, 1925. He attended middle school and high school in the same school. In the records, his name is mentioned as Orhan Bali, Orhan Zahid, and Orhan.

He won the Turkish Language Association Award in 1956 with his novel "Ali". Orhan Hançerlioğlu sang the tales in the broadcast called "One Thousand Nights", which was broadcast on TRT long-wave radio broadcast between 1956 and 1958.

In addition, Hançerlioğlu was the grand master of the Turkish Grand Masonic Assembly between 1966 and 1968.

== Bibliography ==
Novel & Story

- Yedinci Gün
- Ali
- Ekilmemiş Topraklar
- Bordamıza Vuran Deniz
- Karanlık Dünya
- Kutu Kutu İçinde
- Oyun
- Büyük Balıklar

Philosophy works

- Düşünce Tarihi
- Felsefe Ansiklopedisi
- İnanç Tarihi

Dictionary works

- Felsefe Sözlüğü
- Türk Dili Sözlüğü
- Dünya İnançları Sözlüğü
- İslam İnançları Sözlüğü
- Ruhbilim Sözlüğü
- Toplumbilim Sözlüğü
- Ekonomi Sözlüğü
- Ticaret Sözlüğü
