= Mahmudlu, Jabrayil =

Mahmudlu
- Location within Azerbaijan
- Coordinates: 39°19′21″N 47°09′55″E
- Country: Azerbaijan
- District: Jabrayil

Population
  - Total: 0
- Time zone: UTC+4 (AZT)
  - Summer (DST): UTC+5 (AZT)

Mahmudlu is a village in the Jabrayil District of Azerbaijan. It is currently uninhabited.

On October 4, 2020, according to the President of Azerbaijan, the village was captured by the Army of Azerbaijan.
