= Şükürbəyli, Jabrayil =

Şükürbəyli
- Location within Azerbaijan
- Coordinates: 39°19′07″N 47°08′54″E
- Country: Azerbaijan
- Rayon: Jabrayil

Population
  - Total: 0
- Time zone: UTC+4 (AZT)
  - Summer (DST): UTC+5 (AZT)

Şükürbəyli (also, Shekyur-Beklu and Shukyurbeyli) is a village in the Jabrayil Rayon of Azerbaijan. Currently uninhabited.
