= Yuxarı Maralyan =

- Location within Azerbaijan
- Coordinates: 39°19′50″N 47°11′47″E
- Country: Azerbaijan
- Rayon: Jabrayil

Population
  - Total: 0
- Time zone: UTC+4 (AZT)
  - Summer (DST): UTC+5 (AZT)

Yuxarı Maralyan (also, Yukhary-Maral’yan) is a village in Jabrayil Rayon, in the south-west of Azerbaijan. It is currently uninhabited.
