= Veysəlli =

Veysəlli or Veysanli or Veysalli or Veysally or Veysəili may refer to:

- Aşağı Veysəlli, Azerbaijan
- Daş Veysəlli, Azerbaijan
- Göyərçin Veysəlli, Azerbaijan
- Veysəlli, Goychay, Azerbaijan
- Veysəlli, Jabrayil, Azerbaijan
- Yuxarı Veysəlli, Azerbaijan

== See also ==
- Veyselli, Erdemli, Mersin Province, Turkey
