= Actions in support of Azerbaijan in Iran (2020) =

- Part of Second Nagorno-Karabakh War
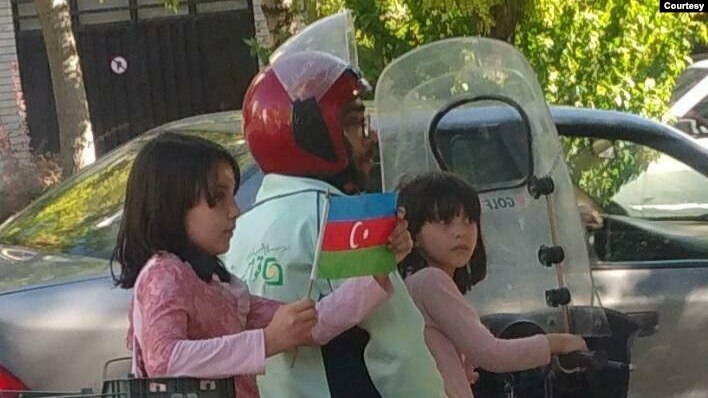
- July 2020. A family holding a flag to show support for Azerbaijan in Tabriz.
- Date: 2020
- Location: Tabriz, Urmia, Ardabil, Zanjan, Maku, Marand, Parsabad, Rasht, Tehran

Actions in support of Azerbaijan in Iran — support rallies for Azerbaijan, actions and demonstrations against Iran and Armenia by Iranian Azerbaijanis after the Battle of Tovuz and the Second Karabakh War in 2020.

Demonstrations were prevented in several cities. The security forces intervened in more than ten city, broke up the action and arrested its participants. The participants of the action showed their support for the Armed Forces of Azerbaijan and shouted slogans against Armenia and Iran. Hundreds of detained citizens included women, elderly and children. Many of them faced violence during their detention. Some of them were tortured and beaten when the demonstrations were broken up, while others were in prison. Sajjad Colani, who is visually impaired, was beaten and his nose was broken during his arrest. Fatma Ibrahimzade, detained in Tabriz, was interrogated and tortured in front of her 13-year-old daughter Kovsar Nemati. 74-year-old Parviz Siyabi, who was arrested in Ardabil, was beaten in prison. Most of the participants of the action were also subjected to flogging. According to human rights defenders Jala Tabrizli and Sahin Khiyavli, the purpose of the courts in imposing this punishment was to humiliate the honor of national activists.

In October, Amnesty International expressed concern over the large-scale arrest of Azerbaijani national activists in various cities in Iran and demanded their unconditional release. A group of Iranian Azerbaijanis feminists issued a statement about the Karabakh conflict and demanded the implementation of UN resolutions and an end to the occupation in order to ensure peace. 100 Azerbaijani cinematographers living in Iran issued a statement of support for the Azerbaijani incorporation of Karabakh. 669 Iranian Azerbaijani poets, writers and scientists living in Iran made a statement in support of Azerbaijan under the organization of South Azerbaijan Union of Poets and Writers. The Azerbaijan Student Movement also issued a statement of support for Azerbaijan. The statement of the Student Movement was signed by various student organizations, magazines and associations established by Iranian Azerbaijanis operating in universities located in cities such as Tabriz, Urmia, Gilan, Zanjan, Ardabil, and Tehran.

On October 14, 2021, human rights defenders living in the Republic of Azerbaijan appealed to the UN Human Rights Committee, Amnesty International and Iran regarding the arrest of Iranian Azerbaijanis activists. They strongly condemned the use of physical force, torture, and inhumane treatment by security forces, denouncing their arrest as a violation of human rights, and called for their immediate release.

== History ==
Both during the First Karabakh War and during the occupation of Karabakh, there were protests against Iran's assistance to Armenia and the Republic of Artsakh in Karabakh. These protests were made at various times by Azerbaijani citizens, at the state level or by world Azerbaijanis as well as Iranian Azerbaijanis. In addition, the events that took place in Azerbaijan at different times were supported by the Iranians Azerbaijanis. Often these support actions were broken up, and those who took part in them were either arrested, tortured or persecuted.

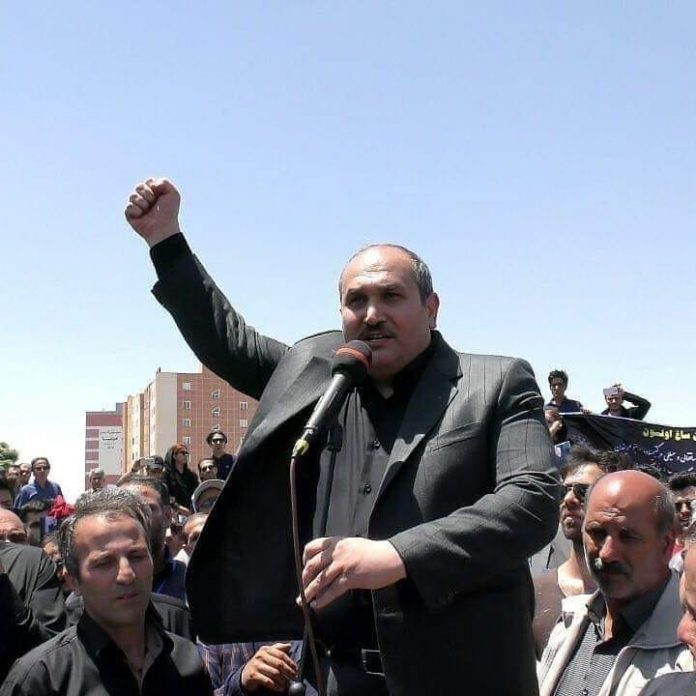
Abbas Lisani

In the following years, the Karabakh issue remained a constant topic of concern in the regions where Iranians Azerbaijanis reside. In June 2004, Armenian state officials visited Ardabil to discuss and promote economic cooperation. However, when it was revealed that the Armenian delegation included representatives from Artsakh Republic, the local population protested. When these protests failed to achieve their goal, demonstrators gathered in Ardabil's Sarchesme Mosque. Security forces stormed the mosque, beating and arresting those inside. Among them was national cultural activist Abbas Lisani, who was brutally beaten until he lost consciousness. The assault left him with broken ribs, a fractured nose, and damage to his lungs and kidneys. He was arrested and held in solitary confinement at an undisclosed location for two days before being transferred to the 7th department of the Ardabil Revolutionary Court, where his detention was extended by another month. Lisani remained in solitary confinement in Ardabil prison, and despite repeatedly requesting medical treatment and going on a hunger strike to demand it, his request was not granted.

On July 22, 2004, he was released on bail set at 200 million rials. Later, he was fined 800,000 rials and sentenced to 15 lashes for "disturbing public order.

Nikol Pashinyan on February 27, 2019 He met with the Armenian community at the Ararat sports complex in Tehran. At this meeting, he took a picture with a banner with the slogan "Karabakh is Armenia and the end". Later, there were protests against it both in the Republic of Azerbaijan and by the Iranian Azerbaijanis. On March 1, 2019, activists wrote the slogan "Karabakh is an integral part of Azerbaijan" on the wall of that complex located in Tehran.

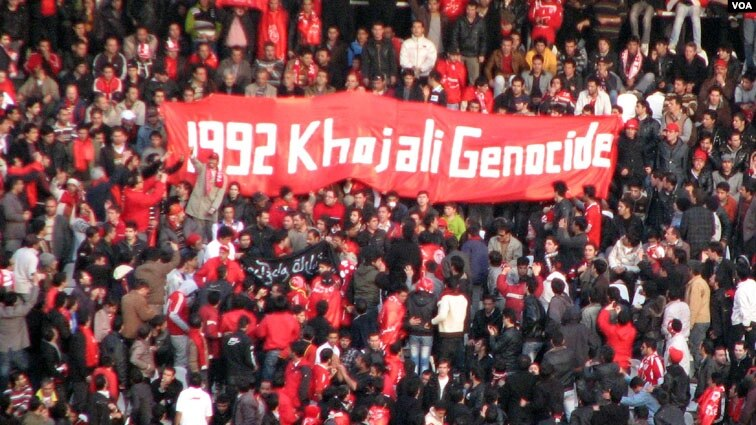
Fans of the "Tractor" football club commemorate the Khojaly genocide. February 26, 2010.

Ehsan Ismaildokht, who was released after 1 month and 10 days of imprisonment, left the country and later took a picture of the torture marks on his back and shared it. During the game, the fans in the stadium chanted "Karabakh is ours, it will be ours!" chanted. They raised 2 banners and the flag of Azerbaijan.

On September 3, 2020, the final match of the Iran Cup was held in Tehran.

In April 2020, video footage taken in Khankendi, which was occupied by the Armenian Armed Forces, caused protests in Azerbaijan. In these images, Armenian activists protested their arrival in Khankendi by filming Iranian fuel trucks.

Tofig Zulfugarov, the former Minister of Foreign Affairs of Azerbaijan, who gave an interview in June 2020 of Russia He noted that the weapons provided to Armenia were delivered through Iran.

After the start of the Second Karabakh War, video footage and images taken by Iranian Azerbaijanis began circulating on social networks, allegedly showing weapons, ammunition, and military equipment purchased from Russia being transported to Armenia via the Nurduz border crossing in Iran. On September 29, the Iranian Ministry of Foreign Affairs denied these claims. However, Azerbaijani media later shared additional footage showing military equipment being transferred through Iranian territory to Armenia. Azerbaijani MP Sabir Rustamkhanli accused Iran of facilitating the transport of weapons to Armenia from various countries. In response, Mahmoud Vaezi, head of the Iranian President's Affairs Department, denied these allegations during a phone call with Azerbaijan's Deputy Prime Minister, Shahin Mustafayev, stating that such rumors aimed to disrupt relations between the two countries. On October 5, Saeed Khatibzadeh, the spokesman for Iran's Ministry of Foreign Affairs, reiterated at a press conference in Tehran that Iran does not permit the transfer of weapons or military vehicles to Armenia through its borders. Iranian state-affiliated media also addressed the issue, asserting that the trucks shown in the footage were Kamaz trucks that the Armenian government had previously purchased from Russia. Reports further claimed that a total of 670 trucks were involved.

== During July clashes in 2020 ==
After the Tovuz battles that started on July 12, 2020, Azerbaijanis living in Iran called for support actions for Azerbaijan in the cities of Tabriz, Urmia, Ardabil, Zanjan, Sulduz and Tehran. Before the day of the action, Iranian security forces called and threatened some national activists in these cities and demanded that they refuse to participate in the rally. The citizens who participated in the rally and gathered in the predetermined places were subjected to a very harsh reaction and were beaten, and the march was not allowed.

On July 16, a demonstration in support of Azerbaijan was held by local residents in front of the Azerbaijani consulate in Tabriz. The participants condemned Armenia's occupation policies, chanting slogans such as "Long live Azerbaijan, let those who oppose it be blind!" and "Karabakh is ours, it will be ours!" Several demonstrators, including Hakima Ahmadi, Yaseman Zafari, Sadullah Sasaniyan, Rahim Sasaniyan, and Mehdi Purali, were detained during the protest. In January 2021, the Second Criminal Court of Tabriz (Department No. 112) sentenced them to one year in prison and 60 lashes on charges of "violating public order," "participating in illegal gatherings," and "rebelling against officers."

On July 21, each of them was temporarily released until the day of the trial in exchange for a guarantee of 50 million tomans. Both national activists were charged with "propaganda against the Islamic Republic of Iran" and "undermining national security and public order". In August, national activist Farid Khorshidi was acquitted due to lack of evidence against him. Salar Tahir Afshar was sentenced to 3 years in prison in 2021.

Huseyn Shahidi, Hadi Alishi and Yagub Majidi were arrested and taken to Evin prison at the rally in support of Azerbaijan held in front of the Armenian embassy in Tehran on July 16. Until July 20, their relatives were not told where they were kept. Huseyn Shahidi, Hadi Alishi, Yagub Majidi were released on July 20, but Hamid Jabbarli was not released. Hamid Jabbarli called his family that day and said that Evin was in prison. Because he spoke Azerbaijani, he was told by the prison guards that he should speak Persian and the call was cut off. Later, he was kept in the same cell with two ISIS members.

== During the Second Karabakh War ==
At various times, Azerbaijanis living in Iran held demonstrations in multiple cities, including Tehran, in support of the Azerbaijani Army and in protest against Iran's assistance to Armenia. Protesters chanted slogans such as "Karabakh is ours, it will be ours!" and "Supporting Armenia is a crime, a crime." The demonstrators also protested the transfer of military cargo from Russia to Armenia through Iran and demanded the closure of the Norduz border crossing. In cities like Ardabil, Tabriz, Urmia, Zanjan, Julfa, Alamdar, Khiyav, Kaleybar, Maki, Maragha, Marand, Sulduz, Parsabad, and Tehran, hundreds of Azerbaijani protesters were arrested, beaten, and subjected to torture. Not all detainees were arrested during the protests—many Turkish national cultural activists were apprehended at their homes or workplaces, either before or after the demonstrations.

In October 2020, a group of Iranian Azerbaijani feminists released a statement regarding the Karabakh conflict. In this statement, they condemned the war and called for an end to the occupation, urging the implementation of UN resolutions to ensure peace.

=== Ardabil ===
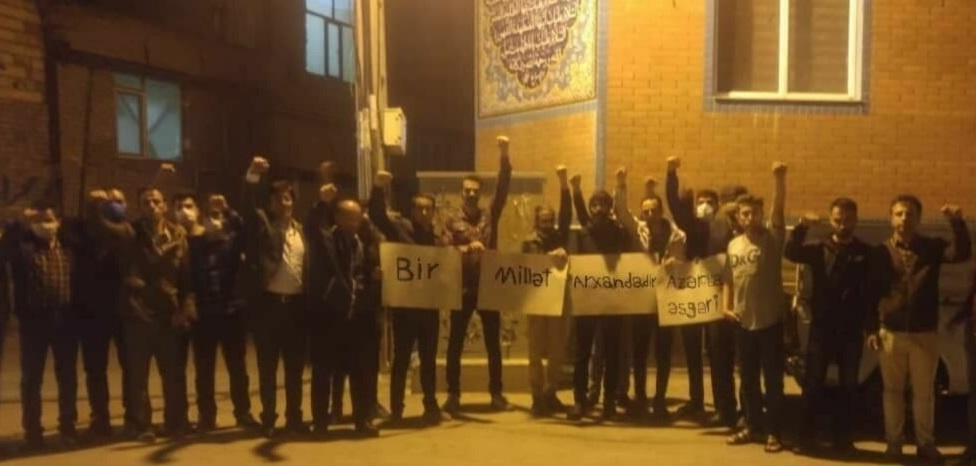
Residents of Ardabil supporting Azerbaijan in 2020.

On September 29, 2020, activists held a demonstration in support of the Azerbaijani Army and to protest Iran's aid to Armenia in Ardabil's Jiral Park. The security forces of the Iranian regime responded by beating and arresting the participants. After the activists were beaten, they were confined to a room where pepper spray was released, intensifying their suffering. The gas caused severe reactions, with some participants' facial skin peeling off due to its effects. Among those arrested was Sajjad Colani, a visually impaired activist, who was also beaten and his nose was broken.

Abbas Lisani, an Azerbaijani national cultural activist and prisoner of conscience, addressed a large crowd following the start of the Second Karabakh War. While imprisoned, he faced a ban on meeting his relatives and making phone calls. On November 20, 2020, while detained in section 7 of Ardabil prison, Lisani protested these bans by staging a 5-hour sit-in at the prison guard's office. The restrictions were reportedly enforced at the direction of Ardabil’s head of intelligence, the regional justice director, Nasir Atabati, and Ardabil’s prosecutor, Seyyed Abdullah Tabatabayi. Following his protest, Lisani was allowed to meet with his relatives, though the ban on phone communication remained in place.

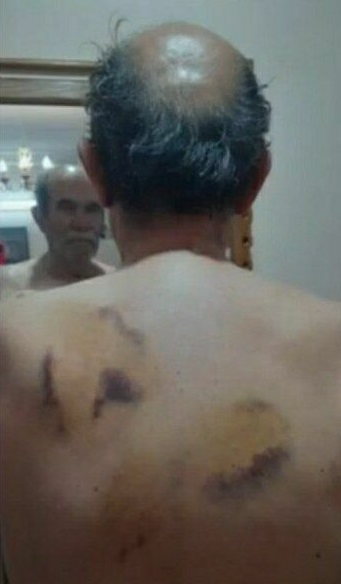
Beating and torture marks on the body of 74-year-old Parviz Siyabi, who was arrested in the action in Ardabil

On September 30, 2020, several national activists in Ardabil posed for a photo with a banner in front of Sheikh Safi's tomb, showing their support for Azerbaijan. The banner, written in the Latin alphabet, read, "One nation is behind you, the Azerbaijani army." Security forces stormed Khairju’s house by climbing over the yard wall and proceeded to beat and insult him, as well as his family members and neighbors who tried to intervene. The incident, which was captured on video, sparked public protests. Later, Afsana Akbarzadeh, Ali Khairju's wife, visited the 10th department of the Ardabil prosecutor’s office to inquire about her husband’s situation. There, a judge named Nonahal insulted and arrested her as well, though she was released after a day of detention. That same night, security forces also raided the homes of activists Mohsen Ismaili Aghdam and Samad Nazmi, attempting to arrest them. However, due to the resistance from their neighbors, the security forces were unable to make the arrests.

On October 3, 2020, Amnesty International voiced its concern for the well-being of 20 Turkish activists, including Asghar Akbarzadeh, Murtaza Parvin, Mustafa Parvin, Mohammad Colani, Meysam Colani, and Ali Khairju, who had been arrested in Ardabil on the first day of the protests. Among those arrested was 74-year-old Parviz Siyabi, who was temporarily released on bail on October 5. After his release, he shared images of his body to illustrate the extent of his injuries, revealing fractures in his arm and bruises on his back and arms, indicating he had been severely beaten.

In December 2020, Department No. 110 of the Second Criminal Court of Ardabil sentenced Meysam Colani and Ali Khairju to four months in prison and 20 lashes each on the charge of "participating in disrupting public order by creating confusion."

On October 9, 2021, the Ardabil city court sentenced several national cultural activists. Huseyn Balakhani, Asghar Akbarzadeh, Mustafa Parvin, Murtaza Parvin, Mojtaba Parvin, Hamid Heydari, Mohammad Colani, Subhan Bakhshi, Mehdi Hushmand, Bahman Kheirju, and Sajjad Colani were found guilty under Article 607 of the Criminal Code of the Islamic Republic of Iran and each received a sentence of 7 months and 16 days in prison, along with 74 lashes.

=== Tabriz ===
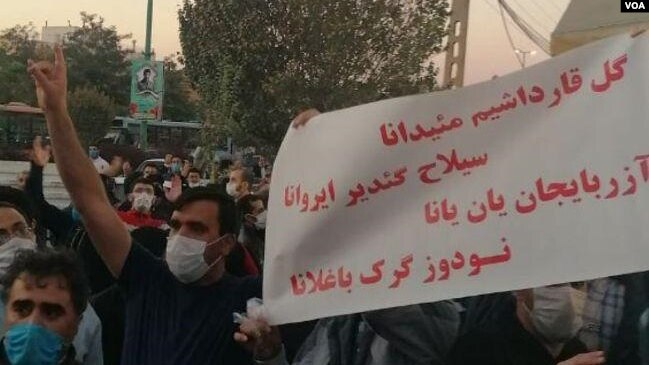
"Come to the square, my brother, guns are going to Yerevan", "Nurduz should be closed" Tabriz, 18.10.2020.

On October 1, the largest protests took place in Tabriz, resulting in the highest number of arrests in the city. Participants in the demonstrations chanted slogans such as "Long live Azerbaijan," "Karabakh is ours, it will be ours," and "We are ready to die, we are Babak's soldiers." On Rastakucha Street, a group of citizens managed to rescue some of the detained participants from the hands of the riot police. Despite this, most of the demonstrators were beaten, and around 40 individuals were arrested.

In October 2020, national activists in Tabriz announced a "Support for Karabakh" rally scheduled for October 18. Following this announcement, employees of the Iranian Ministry of Intelligence contacted many activists, threatening them with arrest and summoning some to the ETTELAAT Office. Activists such as Rasul Razavi, Huseyn Amir-Hijri, and Huseyn Mohammadiya were arrested on October 17, a day before the planned demonstration. Despite these threats and arrests, a support rally for Azerbaijan took place in Tabriz on October 18. The protest continued into the night, even in the face of strict police intervention. Participants chanted slogans such as "Come to the square, my brother, arms are going to Yerevan," "Karabakh is ours, it will be ours," "Protection of Armenia is a crime, a crime," and "Tabriz, Baku, Ankara, Hail to Turan!" Among those arrested were Shima Almasi, Mehtab Asgarinejad and her daughter Aylin Shirzadi, Habiba Barqi, Mina Valipour, Sara Turi, and Fatima Ibrahimzadeh with her daughter Kovsar Nemati. Fatima Ibrahimzadeh, who was arrested with her 13-year-old daughter Kovsar, was released after 24 hours of detention.

On October 17, Akbar Muhajiri, Rasul Razavi, and Huseyn Mahammadiyan, who were arrested, started a hunger strike, protesting that their arrest was illegal.

One of those arrested, Siyamak Kushi, was temporarily released. They were not given water to drink during the 2 days of detention, and those who wanted food were taken out of the room and beaten. He saw more than 30 men and more than 10 women among those arrested in the detention center.

=== Zanjan ===
On September 30, a group of young Azerbaijanis in Zanjan unveiled a poster that read, "Motherland is ahead of the borders on the maps," near the Dome of Soltaniyeh. The following day, Azerbaijanis living in Zanjan gathered in Sabze Meydan to show their support for Azerbaijan. However, before the action began, security officials arrived at the square. Individuals displaying placards and banners in support of Azerbaijan's military operations in Karabakh faced abuse and beatings from plainclothes policemen. Some protestors who were arrested by security forces were released with assistance from their fellow demonstrators. The protest resumed about an hour after it was initially dispersed, with participants chanting, "Karabakh is ours and will be ours." However, the rally was once again interrupted by security forces, resulting in the detention of several individuals, including Akbar Karabagi and Majid Karim.

=== Urmia ===
On October 1, rallies in support of Azerbaijan were held on Imam and Atayi streets in Urmia. During these protests, several individuals, including Hushang Nagizadeh, Amir Govhari, Sahand Behnamun, Reza Khalili, Javad Rzayi, Ashkan Saadatmehr, and Abulfazl Askari, were arrested. Some of them were later temporarily released. On November 22, additional arrests occurred when Yunus Shirzad Javan, Ramin Khuda Bakhsh, Salar Tahir Afshar, Sahand Behnamun, Husniya Intikhabi Hansanluyi, Ramin Dehgan, Erfan Mehdi Khanli Saatlu, Amir Izzati Heydarlu, Farhad Mohammadi, Javad Rizayi, and other activists were summoned to the 8th department of the Urmia General and Revolutionary Prosecutor's Office, where they were subsequently detained.

Salar Tahir Afshar was arrested in Urmia in 2020. He was convicted and sentenced to 4 years in prison on the charges of "propaganda against the system" and "organizing an illegal protest." Later, his sentence was reduced to 1 year by the West Azerbaijan Court of Appeals. On June 19, 2021, he was released from prison with an electronic handcuff.

=== Khoda Afarin ===
On October 18, 2020, when Xudafərin settlement was captured by the Azerbaijan Armed Forces, videos have been released showing Azerbaijanis living on the south side of the Araz River cheering the Azerbaijani soldiers entering the banks of the river belonging to the Republic of Azerbaijan. The people gathered there cheered the soldiers and chanted the slogans "Let them be blind whoever don't want Azerbaijan to be united", "Long live Azerbaijan".

After Azerbaijan captured the border regions with Iran, a mechanized infratry brigade called "Imam Zaman" was deployed to the Khoda Afarin region of Iran. Later, on October 24, the commander of the Ground Forces of the Islamic Revolutionary Guard Corps, Mohammad Pakpour, stated that the brigade was stationed there to protect the residents of Khudaferin and the borders. However, the army's training exercises near the border with Azerbaijan during the war and its deployment in the area were condemned by the local residents.

National activist Vugar Nemat, residing in Garadagh, was arrested by the ETTELAAT forces in Keleybar on October 30, following an interview he gave to the Azerbaijan service of RFE/RL. In this interview, he expressed that the people in the southern region of the Araz River were observing the battles and the advances of the Azerbaijani army with joy. Prior to his arrest, he had been summoned to the ETTELAAT Office in Keleybar on October 1, where he was questioned for several hours.

=== Other regions and activities ===
On October 1, a rally in support of Azerbaijan began at Imam Huseyn Square and 17 Shahrivar Street in Tehran. The participants of the action raised the Azerbaijani flag and chanted the slogans "Supporting Armenia is a crime", "Norduz should be closed", "Long live Azerbaijan", "Karabakh dear Karabakh, I sacrifice myself for you, Karabakh " and "Karabakh is ours, it will be ours".

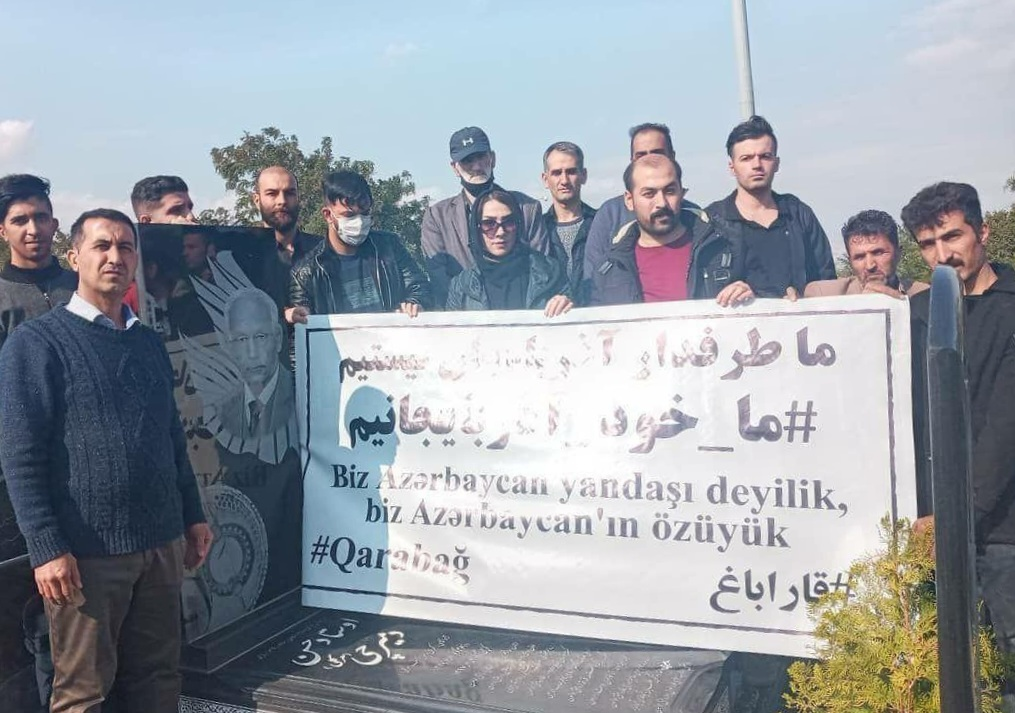
Residents of Tabriz next to the grave of Hasan Demirchi, Vadi-e Rahmat cemetery 2020.

Even if people in Sulduz applied to the municipality to hold an action in support of Azerbaijan, they received a no answer. A day before the day of the action, several national activists were detained. Vahid Khavandi, Siyamek Seyfi, Kazim Safabakhsh, Mehdi Ibadullahi, Shahruz Himmatoglu and Peyman Aghayi were detained in support actions held in Khiyav and Mughan regions.

On October 1, Azerbaijani Turks living in Iran launched a campaign called "We are Azerbaijan!" to show support for the Republic of Azerbaijan and its army, as well as to protest against the Iranian government.

On October 3, 669 Turkish poets, writers, and scientists living in Iran, organized by the Iranian Azerbaijanis Poets and Writers Union, issued a statement in support of Azerbaijan.

The following day, on October 4, Said Sultani and Babek Kiyumars were arrested in the city of Julfa. They were held in the ETTELAAT detention center in Tabriz for more than two months before being transferred to Tabriz prison. In December 2021, the 3rd branch of the Tabriz Revolutionary Court sentenced both individuals to two years in prison under Article 499 of the Iranian Criminal Code for "membership to illegal groups to undermine the country's security."

In October, Aydın Hilali painted over his shop in Nadarli town and hung a poster with the slogan: "Karabakh is ours, it will be ours!" His shop was subsequently closed down by the Iranian police's public spaces control unit. Murtuz Nurmohammadi and Hossein Amani were summoned to the intelligence department of the Iranian police in connection with that poster.

On October 18, in the city of Rasht, in front of the Islamic Culture and Guidance Department of Gilan province, the Azerbaijani population held a protest in support of the Azerbaijani army. The participants raised a placard with the inscription "We are not supporters of Azerbaijan, we are Azerbaijanis." Following the protest, Vadud Asadi, Mohammad Eyni, and Ibrahim Ganji were arrested. Mohammad Eyni was charged with "conducting propaganda against the system" and "acting against national security" and was sentenced to a total of 2 years and 7 months in prison. After serving 8 months in Rasht prison, he was released on August 14 with an electronic handcuff, which was removed in February 2023, granting him full release.

== Support for detainees ==
In August 2020, members of the Azerbaijani diaspora in the United States held a protest in Washington in front of the office building representing the interests of the Islamic Republic of Iran. They issued a statement condemning the increasing pressure by the Iranian government on national activists defending the rights of Azerbaijanis. Additionally, they called for the release of national activists such as Dr. Latif Hasanli, Abbas Lisani, Alirza Farshi, Behnam Sheikhi, Hamid Manafi Nadarli, Yasemen Zafari, Hakima Ahmadi, Sadullah and Rahim Sasaniyan, Hamid Jabbarli, Maqsud Fazli, and others who had participated in rallies held in various cities in support of the Republic of Azerbaijan in July 2020.

On October 26, 2020, slogans were written on the walls of the street in Ardabil against the arrests of people in support of Karabakh rallies. Slogans such as "Free Azerbaijani artists and political activists" and "Free activists who support Karabakh" are written on the walls.

On October 14, 2021, human rights defenders living in the Republic of Azerbaijan appealed to the UN Human Rights Committee, Amnesty International and Iran regarding the arrest of Iranian Azerbaijani activists. They strongly condemned the use of physical force and torture by the security forces against the activists, their inhumane treatment, their arrest as a violation of human rights, and demanded their immediate release.

== After the war ended ==
In 2020, Firuz Akili and Babek Delkhuni were arrested and taken to an unknown location for celebrating the incorporation of Karabakh in the city of Sarab.

In November 2020, Ogtay Lisani, the son of Abbas Lisani, was accused of "disturbing public opinion" by the Ardabil Public Catering Facilities Control Department for distributing sweets on the occasion of the capture of Shusha on November 9, and he was banned from continuing his work in the Ardabil bazaar.

Journalist Parviz Yari noted that 242 Turkish activists were arrested during the protests and the year after. In addition, 24 women were among those arrested. Some women were detained with their children. Detained in Tabriz, Fatma Ibrahimzade was interrogated and tortured in front of her 13-year-old daughter Kovsar Nemati.

Most of the participants of the action were also flogged. According to human rights defenders Jala Tabrizli and Sahin Khiyavli, the purpose of the courts in imposing this punishment is to humiliate the honor of national activists.

== See also ==
- Azerbaijan–Iran relations
