= Hüseynalılar =

Hüseynalılar or Hüseynallar may refer to:

- Hüseynalılar, Barda, Azerbaijan
- Hüseynalılar, Jabrayil, Azerbaijan
