= Dirili Surkhay =

- Born: 1902; Xudafərin, Jebrail uezd, Elizavetpol Governorate, Russian Empire
- Died: 1945 (aged 42–43); Xudafərin, Jabrayil District, Azerbaijan Soviet Socialist Republic
- Occupations: Ashik and poet

Dirili Surkhay or Ashiq Surkhay Beyali oglu (b. 23 May 1902; Xudafərin, Jebrail uezd, Elizavetpol Governorate, Russian Empire – d. 14 December 1945; Xudafərin, Jabrayil District, Azerbaijan Soviet Socialist Republic) was an Azerbaijani ashug and poet.

== Life ==
Dirili Surkhay was born on May 10, 1902, in the village of Khudayarly, in the foothills of Diridag (now in the Jabrayil region of Azerbaijan). His father's name was Beyali, and his mother was Tukezban Khanum. He studied in the local mullahkhana, then graduated from a madrasa and a Russian-Tatar school. He received his higher spiritual education in Tabriz. He was educated in the Azerbaijani Turkish and Persian languages, and was familiar with classical literature. Upon returning to his homeland, he left to work in religious affairs and learned to sing and play the saz. After a few years, Dirili Surkhay had become famous throughout Karabakh as one of the best songwriters of his time.

After meetings with ashugs of the Karabakh, he became a popular singer, whose songs were composed in the form of goshma and gerayli. His works "Terekeme", "Peri", "Diridag", "Arazbar", "Garchigai", "Motherland" had become very popular both in the south and in the north of Azerbaijan. The main part of the poet's works has not been published and remains in his family. Dirili Surkhay also deeply studied the literary heritage of Dirili Gurbani and considered himself his descendant.

Dirily Surkhay died in 1945 at the age of 43.

== Sources ==
- Çingizoğlu, Anvar (1998). Qarabağın Aran ağzı-Arazbar. Baku: Ozan.
- Çingizoğlu, Anvar (2004). Yük üstü çadırlı, yük altı qatırlı oba: Xudayarlı. Baku: Soy.
- Nəbioğlu, Musa (2010). Ozan-aşıq dünyası. Baku: Nurlan.
