= Qumlaq =

Qumlaq or Kumlak or Kumlakh may refer to:

- Qumlaq, Jabrayil, Azerbaijan
- Qumlaq, Oghuz, Azerbaijan
