= Balyand =

- Location within Azerbaijan
- Coordinates: 39°28′07″N 47°06′17″E
- Country: Azerbaijan
- Rayon: Jabrayil
- Time zone: UTC+4 (AZT)
  - Summer (DST): UTC+5 (AZT)

Balyand is a village in the Jabrayil Rayon of Azerbaijan.

The Azerbaijan Ministry of Defense published a video of the village on December 22, 2020, confirming Azerbaijani rule over the village after its control by ethnic Armenian forces from April 1993 to the 2020 Nagorno-Karabakh war.

== Notable natives ==
- Akif Akbarov — So-called "National Hero of Azerbaijan".
