= Aşağı Mərcanlı =

Aşağı Mərcanlı is a village in the Jabrayil Rayon of Azerbaijan.
