= Lalatapa =

Hill in Jabrayil District, Azerbaijan

Coordinates: 39.40851°N 47.26869°E

Lalatapa (Azerbaijani: Lələtəpə,) is a 271.1 m (889 ft) high hill in the Jabrayil Rayon of Azerbaijan, 2.9 kilometres (1.8 mi) north-west of Çocuq Mərcanlı.

In 2019, an archaeological expedition led by Khagani Almammadov of the National Academy of Sciences of Azerbaijan announced the discovery of a Neolithic settlement near Lalatapa. The settlement reportedly dates back to the first half of the sixth millennium BC and covers a total area of 0.9 hectares. Subsequent archaeological excavations in 2020 revealed a conical ziggurat and the remains of three structures: one round, one oval and one rectangular, with a small fragment of a fence. The multi-tiered round structure, with a diameter of 3.3 m and a height of 1.5–2 m, is said to have served as a living area. In it were discovered two jugs, tools made of stone and bone and remnants of a hearth. A child's skeleton was discovered under the third tier. Additionally, a nearby burial site yielded 14 graves containing not only skeletons but also necklaces made of glass, stone and malachite, along with bone jewelry and a knob.

Having a strategic military importance, the hill was one of the battle sites during the First Nagorno-Karabakh War on February 11–12, 1994, following which it was seized by Armenian troops. Lalatapa was retaken by Azerbaijani forces during the 2016 Nagorno-Karabakh conflict, which was independently confirmed by an AFP journalist.

After the 2020 Nagorno-Karabakh war, in April 2021, the hill again entered public discourse in Armenia when opponents of the Prime Minister of Armenia Nikol Pashinyan accused him of ordering a failed operation to capture Lalatapa in early October 2020, resulting in severe casualties for the Armenian side and the collapse of the Armenian defense on the southeastern part of the front. Pashinyan rejected this accusation, saying that the operation was proposed and planned by generals and that he merely moderated the discussion between them. Lieutenant General Samvel Babayan, who was Secretary of the Security Council of Artsakh during the 2020 war, stated in an interview in April 2021 that he proposed the failed operation, but that it occurred some 10 kilometers away from Lalatapa and resulted in only 2 casualties for the Armenian side.
