= Yanarxac =

- Location within Azerbaijan
- Coordinates: 39°15′36″N 47°02′04.2″E
- Country: Azerbaijan
- District: Jabrayil
- Time zone: UTC+4 (AZT)
  - Summer (DST): UTC+5 (AZT)

Yanarxac (Yanarxaj) is a village in Jabrayil District of Azerbaijan.
