= Aşağı Sirik =

Aşağı Sirik is a village in the Jabrayil Rayon of Azerbaijan.
