= Kavdar =

- Location within Azerbaijan
- Coordinates: 39°18′26″N 47°03′43″E
- Country: Azerbaijan
- Rayon: Jabrayil
- Time zone: UTC+4 (AZT)
  - Summer (DST): UTC+5 (AZT)

Kavdar is a village in the Jabrayil Rayon of Azerbaijan. It was occupied by the Armenian forces in 1993. The Army of Azerbaijan recaptured the village on or around November 4, 2020.
