= Alıkeyxalı =

- Location within Azerbaijan
- Coordinates: 39°13′58″N 47°02′14″E
- Country: Azerbaijan
- District: Jabrayil
- Time zone: UTC+4 (AZT)
  - Summer (DST): UTC+5 (AZT)

Alıkeyxalı (Alykeykhaly) is a village in the Jabrayil District of Azerbaijan.
