= Yuxarı Nüsüs =

Coordinates: 39°29′N 46°54′E

- Location within Azerbaijan
- Country: Azerbaijan
- District: Jabrayil
- Time zone: UTC+4 (AZT)
  - Summer (DST): UTC+5 (AZT)

Yuxarı Nüsüs (Yukhary Nusus) is a village in Jabrayil District of Azerbaijan.
