= Xudafərin =

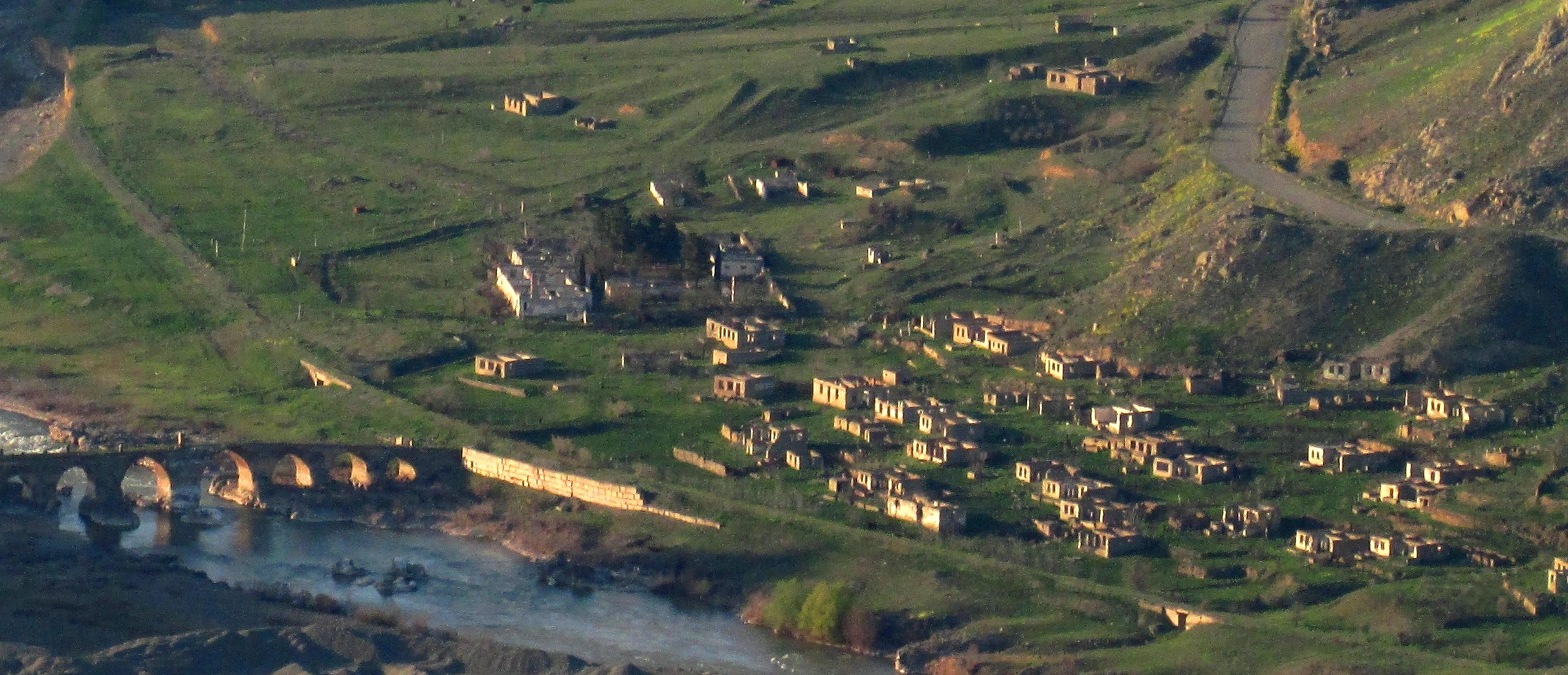

- Location within Azerbaijan
- Coordinates: 39°09′01″N 46°56′49″E
- Country: Azerbaijan
- District: Jabrayil
- Time zone: UTC+4 (AZT)

Xudafərin (Khudaferin) is a town in the Jabrayil District of Azerbaijan. The town is near the Khudaferin Bridges and the border with Iran.

It was occupied by the Armed Forces of Armenia between 1993 and late 2020.

== History ==
The village was originally called Khudayarly after one of the four generations who lived in the village. During the World War II, part of the population moved and founded the village of Khalafli in the east. The rest of the village began to settle in the immediate vicinity of the Khudaferin bridge, and therefore the village began to be named Khudaferin.

During the years of the Russian Empire, the village of Khudayarly was part of Jabrayil district, Elizavetpol province.

During the Soviet years, the village was part of Jabrayil district of Azerbaijan SSR. The town was captured by Armenian forces in the First Karabakh War and was destroyed.

On 18 October 2020, photos and videos of hoisting the Azerbaijani flag on the bridge by Azerbaijani military during the Second Karabakh War appeared on social media.

On 30 October 2020, the Ministry of Defence of Azerbaijan published a reportage from the village of Khudaferin.

== Geography ==
The village is located on the left bank of Araz River, at an altitude of about 295 m.

== Population ==
According to the “Code of statistical data of the Transcaucasian region population, extracted from the family lists of 1886”, in the village of Khudayarly of Kovshutli rural district, of Jabrayil district there were 27 dym where lived 129 Azerbaijanis (listed as “Tatars”), who were Shiites by religion and peasants.

According to the “Caucasian Calendar” for 1912, 157 people lived in the village of Khudayarly, Karyagin district, mostly Azerbaijanis, indicated in the calendar as “Tatars”.

According to the publication “Administrative Division of the ASSR”, prepared in 1933 by the Department of National Economic Accounting of the Azerbaijan SSR (AzNEA), as of 1 January 1933, in the village of Khudayarly, which was part of Kumlak village council of Jabrayil district of Azerbaijan SSR, there were 34 households and 253 residents. 98.9% of the population of the village council were Azerbaijanis (in the source listed as “Turks”).

== Sightseeing ==
Between the village of Khudaferin and the village of Kumlak are located the medieval Khudaferin bridges. Upstream is the Khudaferin reservoir.

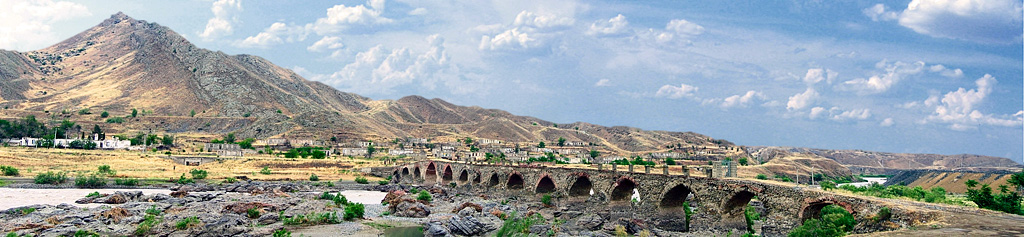
15-span Khudaferin Bridge built in the 12th century, view of Khudaferin village from Iran's side
