= Xanağabulaq =

- Location within Azerbaijan
- Coordinates: 39°25′17.8″N 46°46′51.8″E
- Country: Azerbaijan
- District: Jabrayil
- Time zone: UTC+4 (AZT)
  - Summer (DST): UTC+5 (AZT)

Xanağabulaq (Khanaghabulag) is a village in the Jabrayil District of Azerbaijan.
