= Ashraf Huseynov =

Azerbaijani mathematician (1907–1981)

- Born: 20 September 1907; Əmirvarlı, Elizavetpol Governorate, Russian Empire
- Died: 26 August 1981 (aged 73); Baku, Azerbaijan SSR
- Scientific career
- Institutions: Baku State University

Ashraf Iskandar oglu Huseynov (Azerbaijani: Əşrəf İskəndər oğlu Hüseynov, September 20, 1907, Amirvarli, Jabrayil District — August 26, 1981, Baku) was an Azerbaijani mathematician (professor from 1948, member of Azerbaijan National Academy of Sciences from 1962). His area of contributions embraced nonlinear singular integral equations, differential equations, potential theory and functional analysis.

Huseynov was the first to study the nonlinear Hilbert problem as applied to analytic functions. He also created the H_{α, β, γ} function space and proved some theorems for nonlinear singular integral equations with Cauchy kernel within that space. Huseynov held positions in some Azerbaijani scientific institutions.
