= Qurbantəpə =

Gurbantepe
- Azerbaijani: Qurbantəpə
- Location within Azerbaijan
- Coordinates: 39°23′17.5″N 47°02′14.4″E
- Country: Azerbaijan
- District: Jabrayil
- Time zone: UTC+4 (AZT)
  - Summer (DST): UTC+5 (AZT)

Qurbantəpə (also, Gurbantepe) is a village in the Jabrayil District of Azerbaijan. It was occupied by the Armenian forces in 1993. The Army of Azerbaijan recaptured the village on or around October 30, 2020.
