= Aşıq Məlikli =

- Location within Azerbaijan
- Coordinates: 39°26′52.9″N 46°55′48.6″E
- Country: Azerbaijan
- District: Jabrayil
- Time zone: UTC+4 (AZT)
  - Summer (DST): UTC+5 (AZT)

Aşıq Məlikli (Ashyg Melikli) is a village in the Jabrayil District of Azerbaijan.
