= Şıxalıağalı =

- Location within Azerbaijan
- Coordinates: 39°18′33″N 47°07′21″E
- Country: Azerbaijan
- Rayon: Jabrayil

Population
  - Total: 0
- Time zone: UTC+4 (AZT)
  - Summer (DST): UTC+5 (AZT)

Şıxalıağalı (also, Shykhaliagaly, Shakhali-agalu, and Shikhaly-Agaly) is a village in the Jabrayil Rayon of Azerbaijan. It is uninhabited due to the 2020 Nagorno-Karabakh war.
