= Qərər =

- Location within Azerbaijan
- Coordinates: 39°25′31.9″N 46°58′35.7″E
- Country: Azerbaijan
- District: Jabrayil
- Time zone: UTC+4 (AZT)
  - Summer (DST): UTC+5 (AZT)

Qərər is a village in the Jabrayil Rayon of Azerbaijan.
