= Gasan =

Gasan may refer to:

== Places ==
- Həsənqaydı (also spelled Gasan-Gaydi), a village in Azerbaijan
- Gasan, Marinduque, a municipality in the Philippines on the island of Marinduque
- Gasan (mountain), in South Korea 가산 (경북)
- Gasan, Gasan-dong, a dong (neighbourhood) of Geumcheon-gu in Seoul, South Korea
  - Gasan Digital Complex station, a subway station in Seoul, South Korea

== People ==
- Gasan, also known as Gasan Jōseki (1275–1366), a Japanese Soto Zen master
- Gasan Gasanov, a Russian mixed martial artist
- Gasan Umalatov, a former Russian professional football player
