= Keçəl Məmmədli =

- Location within Azerbaijan
- Coordinates: 39°15′59″N 47°00′19″E
- Country: Azerbaijan
- District: Jabrayil
- Time zone: UTC+4 (AZT)
  - Summer (DST): UTC+5 (AZT)

Keçəl Məmmədli (also Kechal Mammadli) is a village in the Jabrayil District of Azerbaijan.
