= Maşanlı =

- Location within Azerbaijan
- Coordinates: 39°12′56″N 47°02′28″E
- Country: Azerbaijan
- District: Jabrayil
- Time zone: UTC+4 (AZT)
  - Summer (DST): UTC+5 (AZT)

Maşanlı (Mashanly) is a village in the Jabrayil District of Azerbaijan. It was occupied by the Armenian forces in 1993. The Army of Azerbaijan recaptured the village on 19 October 2020.
