= Niftalılar =

- Location within Azerbaijan
- Coordinates: 39°23′46.6″N 46°54′01.4″E
- Country: Azerbaijan
- District: Jabrayil
- Time zone: UTC+4 (AZT)
  - Summer (DST): UTC+5 (AZT)

Niftalılar (Niftalylar) is a village in the Jabrayil District of Azerbaijan.
