= Şahvəlili =

- Location within Azerbaijan
- Coordinates: 39°16′50″N 46°58′01″E
- Country: Azerbaijan
- District: Jabrayil
- Time zone: UTC+4 (AZT)
  - Summer (DST): UTC+5 (AZT)

Şahvəlili (Shahvalili) is a village in the Jabrayil District of Azerbaijan. It was occupied by the Armenian forces in 1993. The Army of Azerbaijan recaptured the village on 19 October 2020.
