= Xudaverdili =

- Location within Azerbaijan
- Coordinates: 39°22′12.3″N 47°02′18.8″E
- Country: Azerbaijan
- District: Jabrayil
- Time zone: UTC+4 (AZT)
  - Summer (DST): UTC+5 (AZT)

Xudaverdili is a village in the Jabrayil District of Azerbaijan. It was occupied by Armenian forces in 1993. The Azerbaijani Army recaptured the village during the 2020 Nagorno-Karabakh war.
