= Jojug Marjanly =

Jojug Marjanly Azerbaijani: Cocuq Mərcanlı
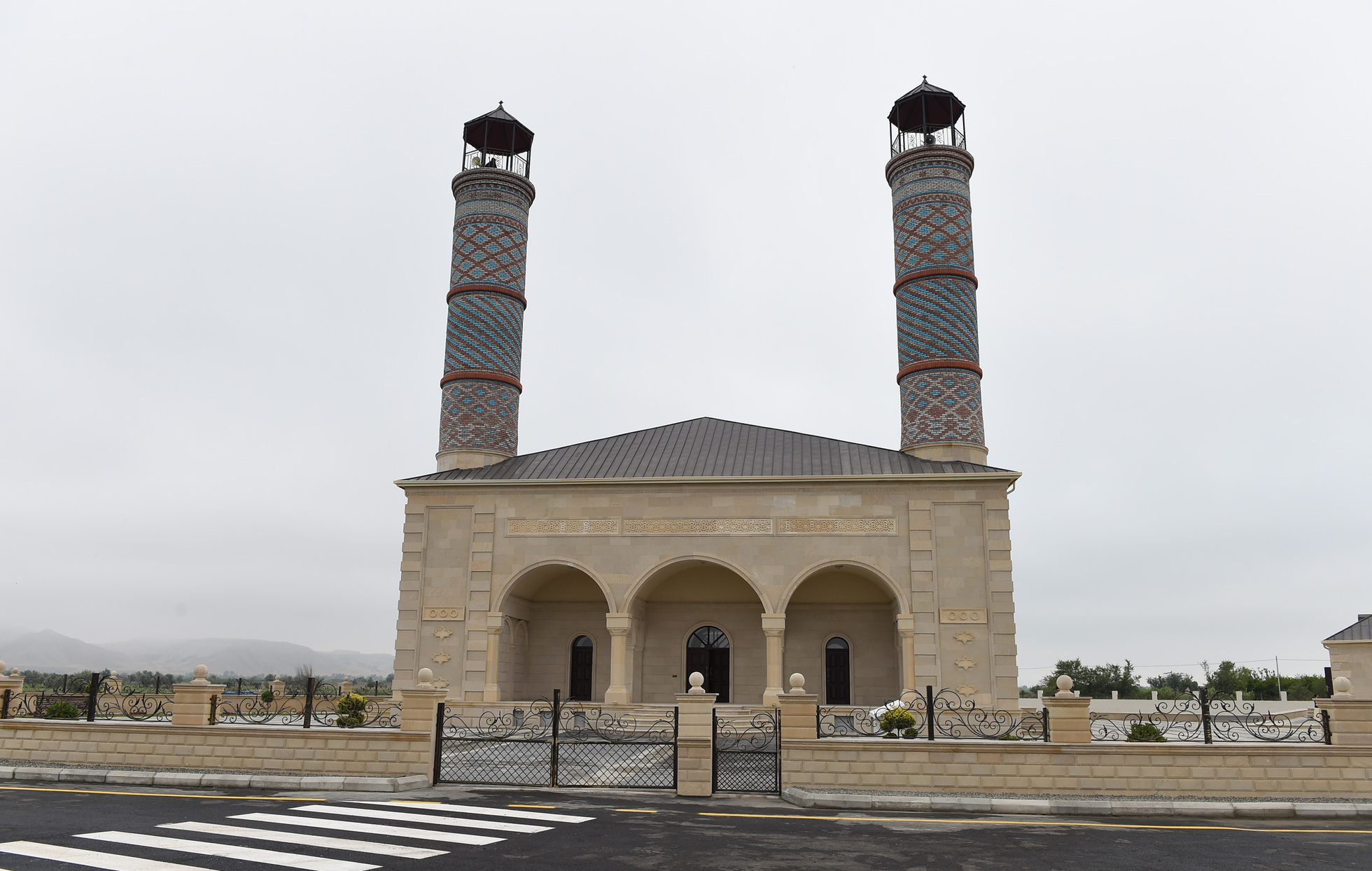
- Mosque in Jojug Marjanli

- Location within Azerbaijan
- Coordinates: 39°23′28″N 47°17′53″E
- Country: Azerbaijan
- District: Jabrayil
- Time zone: UTC+4 (AZT)

Jojug Marjanly (Azerbaijani: Cocuq Mərcanlı) is a village in Jabrayil District of Azerbaijan.

== History ==
In 1993, in the course of the First Nagorno-Karabakh War, the Armenian forces pushed Azerbaijani forces out of the village after gaining control of the nearby hills. It remained under Armenian control for four months during which it was completely razed. Having failed to maintain control of the village, the Armenians retreated to the nearby hills. Cocuq Mərcanlı turned into a no man's land and its population never returned out of fear of shelling, with the exception of one family.

However, during the 2016 Armenian–Azerbaijani clashes, Azerbaijani troops regained control over the strategic Lalatapa hill located 2.9 kilometres (1.8 mi) north-west of the village, which shifted Cocuq Mərcanlı away from the immediate frontline and allowed safe access to the village. On 7 April 2016, internally displaced persons from Cocuq Mərcanlı visited the site of the village for the first time in 23 years. In January 2017, Azerbaijan decided to invest 2 million euros into rebuilding the village. By June 2017, when the village was visited by the President of Azerbaijan Ilham Aliyev 50 houses and a school had been built, the access road was paved and gas supply re-established. Reports in September 2017 suggest that villagers had continued to return to the village since then with a further 100 houses under construction.

Up until 27 September 2020, Cocuq Mərcanlı was the only village of the Jabrayil District effectively controlled by the Azerbaijani Armed Forces. It was also the provisional centre of the district until the recapture of Jabrayil on 9 October 2020.
