= Göyərçin Veysəlli =

- Location within Azerbaijan
- Coordinates: 39°14′57″N 46°59′23″E
- Country: Azerbaijan
- District: Jabrayil
- Time zone: UTC+4 (AZT)
  - Summer (DST): UTC+5 (AZT)

Göyərçin Veysəlli (Goyarchin Veysalli) is a village in the Jabrayil District of Azerbaijan. It was occupied by the Armenian forces in 1993. The Army of Azerbaijan recaptured the village on 19 October 2020.
