= Hüseynalılar, Jabrayil =

Hüseynalılar
- Location within Azerbaijan
- Coordinates: 39°19′30″N 47°03′11″E
- Country: Azerbaijan
- Rayon: Jabrayil
- Time zone: UTC+4 (AZT)
  - Summer (DST): UTC+5 (AZT)

Hüseynalılar (also, Hüseynallar) is a village in the Jabrayil Rayon of Azerbaijan.
