= Ağtəpə =

- Location within Azerbaijan
- Coordinates: 39°21′30″N 47°01′34″E
- Country: Azerbaijan
- District: Jabrayil
- Time zone: UTC+4 (AZT)
  - Summer (DST): UTC+5 (AZT)

Ağtəpə (also Aghtepe and Aghtapa) is a village in the Jabrayil District of Azerbaijan. On 20 October 2020, President of Azerbaijan Ilham Aliyev announced Azerbaijani forces had liberated the village from Armenian occupation, though this claim has not been independently verified by third-party sources.
