= Safarşa =

- Location within Azerbaijan
- Coordinates: 39°22′23″N 47°08′35″E
- Country: Azerbaijan
- Rayon: Jabrayil
- Time zone: UTC+4 (AZT)
  - Summer (DST): UTC+5 (AZT)

Safarşa (also, Səfərşa, Safarcha, and Safarsha) is a village in Jabrayil Rayon of Azerbaijan. On 20 October 2020 President of Azerbaijan Ilham Aliyev claimed Azerbaijani forces had taken the village from Republic of Artsakh, though this has not yet been corroborated by third-party sources.
