= Hallavar =

Coordinates: 41.024167°N 47.482778°E

Hallavar is a village in the municipality of Qumlaq in the Oghuz Rayon of Azerbaijan.
