= Yarəhmədli =

- Location within Azerbaijan
- Coordinates: 39°22′37″N 46°58′38″E
- Country: Azerbaijan
- Rayon: Jabrayil
- Time zone: UTC+4 (AZT)
  - Summer (DST): UTC+5 (AZT)

Yarəhmədli (also, Yarakhmedli) is a village in the Jabrayil Rayon of Azerbaijan. On 20 October 2020, President of Azerbaijan Ilham Aliyev claimed Azerbaijani forces had captured the village from the Republic of Artsakh, though this has not yet been corroborated by third-party sources.
