= Fuğanlı =

- Location within Azerbaijan
- Coordinates: 39°21′14″N 47°05′39″E
- Country: Azerbaijan
- District: Jabrayil
- Time zone: UTC+4 (AZT)
  - Summer (DST): UTC+5 (AZT)

Fuğanlı (Azerbaijani: Fuğanlı) is a village in Shukurbayli administrative-territorial unit of Jabrayil district, Azerbaijan, located on a plain, 6 km southeast of the city of Jabrayil.

== Etymology ==
The former name of the village was Imambaghy (sometimes mentioned as Imambash). The “Encyclopaedic Dictionary of Toponyms of Azerbaijan” suggests that the name of the village comes from the name mentioned since the 15th century for Fegan fortress in Nakhchivan, the families resettled from there founded the village. In this regard, the name of the village means “those who came from Fegan fortress.”

== History ==
The village was founded by families belonging to the Almamedly, Alykeykhaly, Rustamlilar and Shammedli generations. It is assumed that it was founded by families who resettled here from Fegan fortress in Nakhchivan.

During the years of the Russian Empire, the village of Fuganly was part of Jabrayil district, Elizavetpol province.

During the Soviet years, the village was part of Jabrayil district, Azerbaijan SSR. The village was captured by Armenian forces in the First Karabakh War and was destroyed.

During the Second Karabakh War, the Azerbaijani Army regained the control over the village of Fughanli and liberated it. On 20 October 2020, in a video address to the nation, Azerbaijani President Ilham Aliyev announced that the Azerbaijani Army liberated the village of Fuganly in Jabrayil district. On November 7, the Azerbaijani Ministry of Defence published a video footage that allegedly showed the village of Fuganly under Azerbaijani control.

== Population ==
According to the “Code of statistical data of the Transcaucasian region population, extracted from the family lists of 1886”, in Fuganly village, Hajyly rural district, there were 27 dym and lived 128 Azerbaijanis (listed as “Tatars”), who were Shiites by religion and peasants.

According to the “Caucasian Calendar” of 1912, 253 people lived in the village of Fuganly, Karyagin district, mostly Azerbaijanis, listed as “Tatars”.
