= Abbas Lisani =

Azerbaijani civil activist

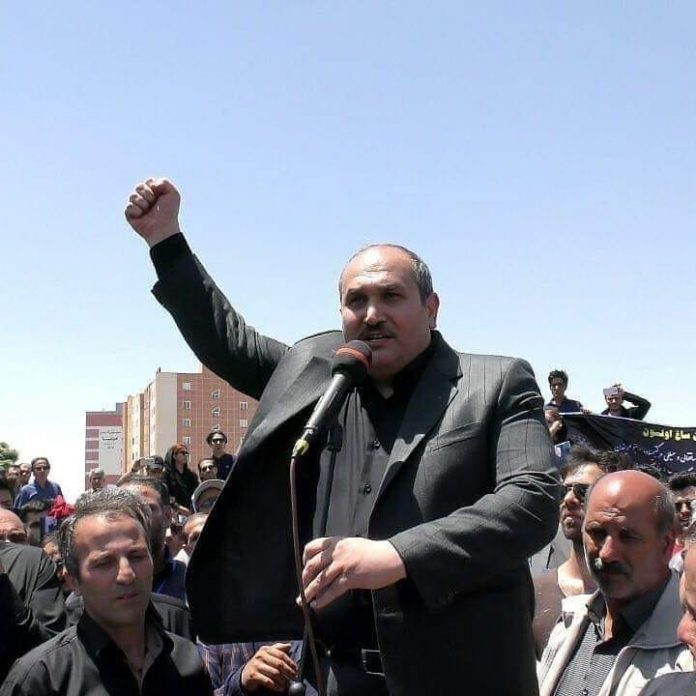
- Lisani in 2008
- Born: 1967-02-18; Ardabil province, Iran
- Years active: since 1997
- Known for: National cultural activist
- Partner: Rugeyya Alizade
- Children: Atilla Lisani; Ogtay Lisani

Abbas Lisani (born 18 February 1967, Ardabil province) is an Iranian Azerbaijani cultural activist in Iran.

Due to his involvement in national cultural activities, he has been incarcerated multiple times since 1997. In 2006 alone, he was tried four times within six months, sentenced to 30 months in prison, endured 50 lashes, and received a three-year exile. His participation in events such as the Babak Castle Congress in 2005, commemorating the anniversary of the Constitutional Revolution, ceremonies held at the tomb of Baqir Khan in Tabriz, and involvement in the National Uprising Day in May 2006 led to these consequences.

In the following years, he was repeatedly imprisoned, faced persecution, and was subjected to exile. Various international organizations, parties, and activists issued statements against his imprisonment. Since 2007, he has been declared a prisoner of conscience by Amnesty International. Several organizations and activists conducted signature campaigns and protest actions to secure his release from prison. He also undertook hunger strikes on multiple occasions to defend his rights and the rights of other prisoners.

In February 2023, he was released from Ardabil prison and exiled to the city of Yazd. However, he stated his innocence, and despite the exile order, he returned to Ardabil city.

== Life ==
=== Early life and activities ===
Abbas Asad oghlu Lisani was born in 1968 in Ardabil. He has faced multiple imprisonments since 1997 due to his involvement in national cultural activities. On 25 August 2003, he was arrested for participating in an event at Babak Castle and was released on 18 September 2003, after posting bail of 50 million rials.

On 22 June 2004, he was arrested for participating in a sit-in protest at Ardabil's Sarcheshmeh Mosque. Security forces attacked the mosque, covering his mouth and nose with a cloth until he lost consciousness. This assault resulted in multiple broken ribs, a damaged nose, a left lung, and a left kidney. He was held alone in an undisclosed location for two days, then brought to the 7th Branch of the Ardabil Revolutionary Court and detained for an additional month. Despite requesting medical attention and undertaking a hunger strike, his requests were denied. He was released on 22 July 2004, after posting bail of 200 million rials. Later, he was fined 800 thousand rials and sentenced to 15 lashes for "disturbing public order."

In 2005, he was arrested for participating in a ceremony held at the tomb of Baqir Khan in Tabriz, commemorating the anniversary of the Persian Constitutional Revolution. On 6 August, the 1st Branch of the Ardabil Revolutionary Court issued a verdict to exile Abbas Lisani to Khuzestan for a year. He was accused of promoting pan-Turkism, engaging in activities against national security, propagating against the system, and publishing a calendar in the Turkish language. Abbas Lisani appealed this decision to the appellate court. Initially, his case was referred to a higher court in Tehran. Later, it was returned to Kalibar for another court hearing. There, the court revoked the earlier decision of one-year exile and sentenced him to one year in prison.

=== 2006–2014 ===
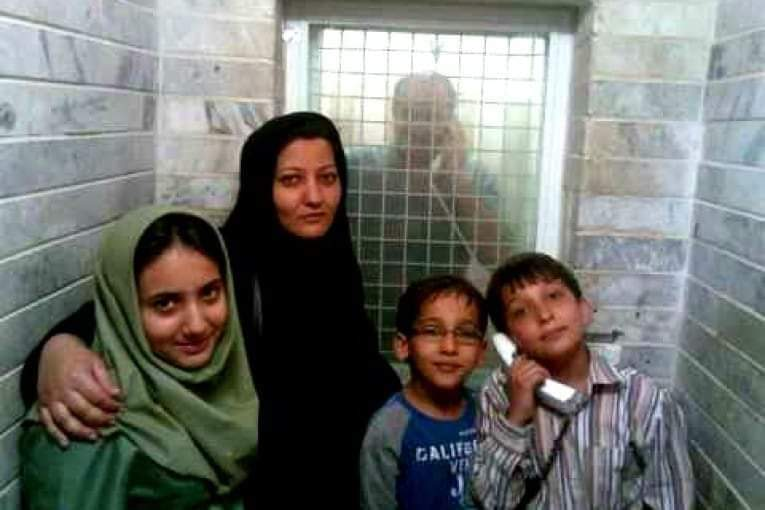
Abbas Lisani and his family in prison 2007.

On 27 May 2006, during the National Uprising Day in Ardabil, Abbas Lisani participated in a gathering that involved tens of thousands of people. Clashes erupted between police forces and protesters, leading to gunfire targeting the demonstrators. Numerous individuals sustained severe injuries, and at least 150 people were arrested. Despite attempts by the police to arrest Abbas Lisani during the incident, the protesters resisted, preventing his arrest. Later, on 3 June 2006, he was arrested for his participation in the National Uprising Day. Around 30 plainclothes officers forcibly entered his home without presenting an arrest warrant and physically assaulted Abbas Lisani in front of his family, including his children and spouse. Additionally, they confiscated books, mobile phones, a computer, and various video discs from his house. Until 7 June, there was no information provided about his whereabouts. However, on 7 June, after allowing him to speak with his family via telephone call, he disclosed that he was held in solitary confinement at Ardabil prison and had initiated a hunger strike. After 58 days of the hunger strike, he halted it on 30 July, after being granted permission to meet with his family.

In September 2006, there was a protest in front of the Ardabil court demanding the release of political prisoners. During this demonstration, several individuals, including Fazail Azizian, were arrested. Kubra Gurbanzade, who went to the prison to visit her spouse, was also detained because of her participation in the protest. Despite being three months pregnant, Kubra Gurbanzade's unjust detention led Fazail Azizian to start a hunger strike in protest. Other detainees joined the hunger strike in support of them. Despite being just four days away from his own release, Abbas Lisani began a hunger strike on 22 September, to support them. After Kubra Gurbanzade was released, the hunger strikers ceased their protest.

The day after his release, on 27 September 2006, Abbas Lisani was sentenced by the Ardabil court to 16 months in prison and 50 lashes for participating in the National Uprising Day. He filed an appeal against this decision on 26 October 2006. However, on 31 October 2006, Abbas Lisani was rearrested.

In March 2007, he was transferred to the 7th section of the prison, where arms and drug traffickers were detained, allegedly to exert pressure on him and the national activist Behruz Alizadeh. During his imprisonment, he faced constant harassment. Secret cameras were installed in his prison room, monitoring his every move. Harsh punishments were imposed on fellow inmates who communicated with or were associated with Abbas Lisani to isolate him. In May 2007, in a letter sent from prison, Abbas Lisani highlighted human rights abuses and repression related to the anniversary of the National Uprising Day, urging people to join in protest against these violations. On 4 March 2008, he was transferred from Ardabil prison to Yazd prison. On 10 September 2008, he participated in the iftar ceremony organized at Seyyad Mohammadian's house in the evening. 17 people were arrested during the raid on this party by the employees of Iran's special services. Abbas Lisani's wife and 3 children were among those arrested. He was released on 29 October 2008. In December 2009, at the funeral of Genghis Bakhtavar, Abbas Lisani and several people who participated in the funeral were beaten by Iranian security officials. Before the funeral, some Azerbaijani national activists were called by ettealaat officials and asked them not to participate in the funeral. After the funeral, Abbas Lisani was called and told that if he did not leave Tabriz, they would send his body to Ardabil.

In 2011 protests occurred in cities inhabited by Azerbaijani Turks against the drying of Lake Urmia. Following these protests, Abbas Lisani and other national activists were arrested in Ardabil. On 9 September 2011, Abbas Lisani was detained at his workplace after protests regarding Lake Urmia's ecological condition in Ardabil on 3 September. He began a hunger strike, citing the illegality of his detention. On 7 November 2011, he was released on bail of 100,000 US dollars according to the decision of the Ardabil Revolutionary Court.

=== 2014–2017 ===
On 20 February 2014, Azerbaijani national activists from various cities in Iranian Azerbaijan gathered at Akbar Abulzadeh's house in Ahvaz to commemorate International Mother Language Day. However, more than 100 activists who attended the event were arrested by Iranian security forces. Among those detained were Abbas Lisani, Saleh Molla Abbasi, Ibrahim Savalan, Ibrahim Nuri, Behzad Abdi, Akbar Abulzadeh, and Abbas Nazari, who were taken to Ettelaat prison. Some of them, including Abbas Lisani, were subjected to torture. Concerned about this, they wrote a letter to the prosecutor of at Ahvaz Judiciary.

In April 2015, the Ardabil Revolutionary Court sentenced Abbas Lisani to one year in prison for allegedly collaborating regularly with "separatist groups abroad and Gunaz TV" and discussing the necessity of a secular regime in an article, which led to charges of "propaganda against the regime."

In July 2015, around 300 Azerbaijani Turkish activists signed a statement in support of Uyghurs. Abbas Lisani, along with Hasan Demirci, Hasan Rashidi, Akbar Azad, and Abdulaziz Azimi Qadim, signed this statement urging Azerbaijani, Turkish, and Iranian legal authorities to address the issues faced by the Uyghur community in international courts.

On 22 July 2015, Abbas Lisani was arrested on his way from home to work. He was detained and later transferred to the 7th section of the Ardabil prison, where inmates detained on charges of narcotics and crimes were held. Upon his transfer, his access to designated outdoor areas for prisoners was restricted, the phones in the section were deactivated, and meeting with families was prohibited. On 25 July 2015, protesting against the violation of prisoners' rights and objecting to the transfer of detainees from the Ardabil region to Gilan, specifically to Heyran, Abbas Lisani began a hunger strike. On 26 July, special forces subjected Abbas Lisani in the 7th section of Ardabil prison to intimidation, threats, and physical abuse. They also assaulted two Baluchi-origin inmates who were supporting and defending Lisani. During his detention, threats of exile were directed at Abbas Lisani. In September 2015, as permission for a family visit was denied, Abbas Lisani initiated a hunger strike. Authorities threatened to transfer him to a remote prison if he didn't end the strike.

In 2015, after a children's program insulting Azerbaijanis in the program "Fitila" broadcast on the Iranian state TV channel, on 9 November 2015, Azerbaijani Turks started protest actions in various cities of Iran. To support the protests, Abbas Lisani also started a hunger strike in prison. After that, he was deported from Ardabil prison to Adilabad prison in Shiraz. Despite being exiled, he continued his hunger strike.

In December 2015, 1046 Turkish activists living in Iran and Iranian Azerbaijan signed a declaration of support against the massacre of Syrian Turkmen. Among those who signed the statement was Abbas Lisani.

In 2016, Yurysh Mehralibeyli, Huseyn Ali Mohammadi, Murtaza Muradpur, Rasul Razavi, and Abbas Lisani, who were detained in Tabriz prison and exiled to Shiraz prison, held a hunger strike from 19 to 21 February on the occasion of World Mother Language Day. They held this hunger strike as a protest against the lack of education in Azerbaijani Turkish in Iran.

On 18 May 2016 Abbas Lisani's prison term ended, but they did not release him. As a protest, Abbas Lisani started a hunger strike on 19 May. Later on the same day, Yurush Mehralibeyli, Rasul Razavi, Huseyn Alimohammadi, Murtaza Muradpour, Latif Hasani, and several national cultural activist who were detained in Tabriz Central Prison, Ardabil Prison and Rajayi-Sharh Prison in Karaj started a hunger strike and announced their support for Lisani. On 25 May 2016, he was temporarily released on bail.

On 7 November 2016 Abbas Lisani was again arrested in court and transferred to the central prison of Khiyav. The reason for his arrest was his speech at the wedding of national activist Aydın Zakiri. Meshkin's Revolutionary Court accused him of pan-Turkism and "propaganda against the regime" in this speech. Later, Abbas Lisani, who said that his arrest was unjustified, appealed to the appeals court. In 2017, the Ardabil appellate court annulled the verdict of the first court and acquitted well-known activist Abbas Lisani.

In August 2017 40 Turkish rights activists were summoned to the Ahar court. Activists, including Abbas Lisani, were tried en masse. In October 2017, Abbas Lisani was summoned to court again.

=== 2018–2020 ===
2018 July 2 marked another arrest for Abbas Lisani, occurring just before the annual Babak Castle Conference. In protest, he initiated a hunger strike. On 14 July, he was released from Tabriz Central Prison on a bail of 500 million rials. Later, on 16 September of the same year, he was summoned to the Tabriz Revolutionary Court. Refusing to comply, Lisani declined the summons as it was delivered via SMS, not an official stamped document.

Subsequently, on 31 December 2018, Abbas Lisani received another SMS notification from the Ardabil Revolutionary Court informing him of a 10-month prison sentence.

In January 2019, he was arrested by security forces in Ardabil and transferred to Tabriz Prison, although the exact reason for his arrest remains unclear, according to Abbas Lisani:

I have two accusations. I was present at the burial of our great national activist, Hasan Agha Demirci. ETTELAAT had given orders not to speak at the funeral, but the public wanted me to speak. I spoke for about 10–12 minutes. There was nothing against the system or the establishment in my speech. I only spoke about Hasan Agha Demirci and Azerbaijan. How could it be against the system here? But if they consider it so, let it be. I will speak. The second accusation is related to the march to Babak Castle last year. During my speech there, I said that we should be strong, and have connections with nations, and one of the places for such connections is Babak Castle, coming together here. They counted these words as an offense too. I was among approximately a hundred people detained at that time. Nevertheless, the meeting continued at Babak Castle. So, I am accused of calling for gatherings both at Babak Castle and at Demirci's funeral. These are false accusations. They don't fit into the law. Every year there is a march to Babak Castle, and it will continue. It will be impossible to prevent this. It is written in the Constitution that every citizen has the right to assemble, to gather.

After being sent to Tabriz Prison on 5 January, Abbas Lisani objected to being illegally tried without an official summons. The Tabriz Court accepted Lisani's objection and temporarily halted the execution of the judgment. Judge Ahrabi signed a temporary release order against a 100 million tuman bail and scheduled a new hearing for 15 January. Upon Lisani's arrival at the Tabriz Revolutionary Court on 15 January, he was arrested by security forces after the session concluded. A few days later, five other activists close to him were tried at the Ardabil Revolutionary Court. Rahim Gulami, Asgar Akbarzadeh, Ali Vasiqi, Mehdi Hushmand, and Saeed Sadiqifar were charged with "illegally organizing support to jeopardize the country's security." Lisani, transferred to Ardabil Prison, initiated a hunger strike in protest against his detention.

On 21 February 2019, in commemoration of International Mother Language Day, Abbas Lisani, serving his sentence in Ardabil Prison, along with Latif Hasani in Karaj Prison, Siyamek Mirzayi and Ibrahim Nuri in Evin Prison, and Amir Settari in Tabriz Prison, initiated a 5-day hunger strike. They conducted this hunger strike in protest of the absence of education in Azerbaijani Turkish in Iran.

On 10 March 2019, they appeared in court in Ardabil. Abbas Lisani refused to wear the prison uniform while being taken to court, citing it as a violation of his human dignity. As a result, officials brought him to court in handcuffs and leg shackles. He requested that his defense to be conducted in Azerbaijani Turkish, presenting his arguments in his mother tongue.

On 13 April 2019, the East Azerbaijan Appeals Court reviewed Abbas Lisani's complaint against the 10-month sentence issued by the Tabriz Revolutionary Court in February. Abbas Lisani was not permitted to attend the court proceedings. Later, the 26th Chamber of the Appeals Court concluded that the imprisonment sentence against the political activist was "in accordance with Sharia and legal rules."

On 8 July 2019, the Ardabil Revolutionary Court sentenced Abbas Lisani to 8 years of imprisonment, depriving him of liberty for allegedly "inciting the population of West Azerbaijan to arm themselves," "forming an illegal group," and "engaging in anti-system propaganda." Additionally, he received a 2-year exile sentence with his family to Yazd. Disagreeing with this decision, Abbas Lisani filed an appeal. On 13 September 2019, he was summoned to the appeals court. The Ardabil Province Appeals Court addressed Abbas Lisani's complaint on 16 September 2019, where he presented his "defense statement" in Azerbaijani Turkish during the court session. He is saying:

If you have justice and honesty within you, if you believe you are right in the accusations and stances you've taken, then open the doors! Establish an open court so that the nation and the entire world can decide for themselves!

The initial verdict had acquitted him of the charges on two counts, but later, those two accusations were reintroduced, extending his sentence from 8 to 15 years. According to some, Lisani received a harsher punishment because he defended himself in court in his native language. After the sentence was extended, Abbas Lisani appealed to Iran's Supreme Court, but the Supreme Court upheld the 15-year sentence imposed by the Ardabil court. On 20 October, Abbas Lisani's lawyer, Mohammadreza Faghihi, was arrested. Faghihi was detained after meeting with Abbas Lisani in the morning at Ardabil's prosecutor's office. Mohammadreza Faghihi was charged by the 102nd Branch of the Ardabil Court for "revealing confidential court documents" and sentenced to 6 months in prison. In March 2020, Mohammadreza Faghihi was acquitted. In July 2020, the Iranian Supreme Court rejected Abbas Lisani's cassation complaint, upholding the 15-year sentence issued by the Ardabil court. Despite the risk of the spread of COVID-19, many prisoners were temporarily released, but Abbas Lisani was not granted this permission, even though he had the right to leave for several days to attend a funeral and mourning ceremony after his brother's death.

After the start of the Second Karabakh War on 27 September 2020, Abbas Lisani was banned from meeting his relatives and talking on the phone. Later, on 13 November, this ban was imposed again. On 20 November 2020, Abbas Lisani, who was detained in the 7th section of Ardabil prison, held a 5-hour sit-in protest in the prison guard's office in protest against the bans imposed on him. It is reported that these bans were implemented on the initiative of Nasir Atabati, the head of the intelligence department of Ardabil province, the director general of regional justice, and the prosecutor of Ardabil, Seyyed Abdullah Tabatabayi. After the action, Abbas Lisani was allowed to be visited by his relatives. However, they did not remove the ban on talking on the phone.

=== After 2020 ===
On 13 January 2021, Yusif Kari, a detained cultural activist, initiated a hunger strike in protest against the misconduct of the deputy prosecutor overseeing the prison and his transfer from his section to the quarantine section. In support of Yusif Kari, Abbas Lisani, detained in Ardabil prison since 18 January, also began a hunger strike. Later, in solidarity with Kari, Siyamak Mirzayi from Evin prison, Ali and Rza Vasiqi from Ardabil prison, joined the hunger strike. Abbas Lisani started a dry hunger strike on 20 January. Yusif Kari, who had started a dry hunger strike on 17 January, ceased his protest after being returned to his section from the quarantine area on the night of 20 January. Following his decision, other national activists supporting Kari also stopped their hunger strikes.

In May 2021, there will be significant back and knee pain, as in prison. He was admitted to the hospital on the 25th because the drugs and effective treatments given by the prison doctors did not work. However, on the same day, he was taken back to prison after surveillance.

On 12 June 2021, his prison officially went on a hunger strike to protest the protests against the prisoners. According to Iranian law, the cells where political prisoners are kept must be separate from other prisoners. But in Iran, courts and prisons, political and social movements do not follow this law to put citizens under the control of security prisoners. Now they increase the psychological pressure on them by transferring national cultural activities and people from serious crimes to the same cell. Later, Yusif Kari also started a hunger strike to support Abbas Lisani. On 13 June, they signed a dry hunger strike using both waters.On 13 June, security guards Ali and Reza Wasighi and Mehrdad Sheikh protested the hunger strike in Ardabil prison. The 5 national activists who started the hunger strike were sent to the quarantine section of the prison for these actions, and they were also banned from making phone calls with their relatives. On 14 June, to support the hunger strike of detained prisoners, national cultural activists Siyamak Mirzai, Kianoush Aslani, and Behnam Shaykhi, held at Evin Prison in Tehran, also started a hunger strike. Later on, in Tehran, Khalid Pirzadeh, Hossein Hashemi, and Mohammad Turkmani, serving sentences, joined the hunger strike. On 16 June, Siyamak Mirzai, Kianoush Aslani, and Tavhid Amir Amini, detained in Tehran's Evin Prison, and supporting the hunger strike, were transferred to the interrogation isolation ward of the prison's intelligence service (Ward 209) for three hours. Later, the prison administration met Abbas Lisani's demands by removing individuals convicted of serious crimes from the section where political prisoners were held. This led the national cultural activists to end their hunger strikes. Ali and Rza Vasiqi, who had been moved to the quarantine section due to their hunger strike, were returned to their previous section on 24 June.

On 30 August 2021, Abbas Lisani was granted a four-day medical furlough against a bail of 800 million Toman. However, on 3 September 2021, he was taken back to prison.

On 22 September 2021, Ali Reza Farshi declared his intent to conduct a three-day hunger strike in protest against the harsh and unjust judgments of Iranian courts, as well as the deprivation of education in the Turkish language at schools. Subsequently, political prisoner Abbas Lisani and seven others joined Ali Reza Farshi in support of this action.

Abbas Lisani, suffering from cardiovascular issues and high blood pressure, was taken to an external clinic for examination in October 2021. Later on 4 November, he was taken for examination by the Ardabil Court Medical Forensic Department. The presentation of his test results and the urgent need for disc surgery were highlighted during the examination. On 24 January 2022, he underwent another examination at the Ardabil Court Medical Forensic Department, where the medical expert commission emphasized the necessity for surgery due to tears in the lumbar intervertebral disc. Consequently, Abbas Lisani was granted a six-month medical furlough starting on 13 February 2022, for treatment outside the prison. After the furlough, national activists from cities such as Tabriz, Urmia, Ardabil, Parsabad, and Khoy visited Abbas Lisani at his home on 15, 20 February and 25. He underwent disc tear surgery at Velayat Hospital in Tabriz on 9 April 2022. Later, a second surgery for the same issue was performed on 24 May 2022. Despite the request and opinion of the medical expert, the Ardabil prosecutor did not extend Abbas Lisani's medical leave, and he was returned to Ardabil Prison on 27 August 2022.

An Azerbaijani national activist, upon the declaration of a "general amnesty decree" by the justice system on 21 February 2023, was released from Ardabil Prison and immediately exiled to the city of Yazd. However, the individual chose not to comply with the exile order and returned to the city of Ardabil, where they were welcomed by other national activists.

== Pressures on his family ==
Abbas Lisani was re-arrested on 31 October 2006. Following his arrest, his wife, Rugayya Lisani, gave interviews to several news websites discussing the incident. Ruqayya Lisani herself was threatened with arrest for spreading the information about her husband's arrest and therefore, giving it to several foreign websites.

In May 2007, Abbas Lisani's nephew, Mehdi Mahmoudpur, was arrested.

On 10 September 2008, in the evening hours, a raid was conducted by Iran's special service agents during an iftar ceremony organized at Sayyad Mohammadiani's house. More than 20 guests, including Abbas Lisani's family members, his wife Rugayya Lisani, and their sons Atilla Lisani and Ogtay Lisani, were detained. Abbas Lisani's family members were released after several hours of questioning.

Following Abbas Lisani's arrest on 9 September 2011, his nephew Mehdi Mahmoudpur was also arrested on 13 September.

In February 2016, Abbas Lisani's wife, Ruqayya Alizadeh, and their two sons were summoned to the second department of the Ardabil Court. The court document they received did not specify why they were summoned, but they were threatened with surveillance if Ruqayya did not appear in court within five days. On 23 February 2016, when Rugayya and their sons appeared at the second department of the Ardabil Court, they refused to answer questions and sign court papers, claiming the questions were irrelevant.

On 8 October 2020, unidentified individuals set fire to a car belonging to Abbas Lisani's family.

In November 2020 Abbas Lisani's son, Ogtay Lisani, was accused of "disturbing public opinion" by the Ardabil Public Catering Facilities Supervision Administration for distributing sweets on 9 November, following the liberation of Shusha. He was prohibited from continuing his work at the Ardabil market.

== Protests against his arrest ==
In January 2007 the Committee for the Defense of the Rights of World Azerbaijanis (CDRWA) appealed to the United Nations Office of the High Commissioner for Human Rights (OHCHR) requesting the release of Abbas Lisani.

On 1 February 2007 Abbas Lisani was declared a prisoner of conscience by Amnesty International.

On 1 February 2007 US State Department spokesman Sean McCormack said that the State Department is concerned about the condition of Azerbaijani Abbas Lisani, who was imprisoned in Iran, and that Lisani is being physically harassed in prison. A State Department statement later stated that the regime in Iran bans the Azerbaijani language in schools, persecutes Azerbaijani activists, and unjustly imprisons people who defend their cultural and linguistic rights, such as Mr. Lisani. In February 2007, Holger Gustafsson, a member of the Swedish Parliament's foreign relations commission, Christian Democratic Party deputy, appealed the Iranian President Mahmoud Ahmadinejad and requested the release of Abbas Lisani. In February 2007, the member of the European Parliament Karl Schliter appealed to Ayatollah Seyyed Ali Khamenei for the release of Abbas Lisani. In his appeal, he drew attention to the problems related to Lisani's conditions of detention, health, and pressure on his family. On 6 March 2007, the State Department of the United States of America presented a report on the state of human rights for 2006. In this report, it is written about the violation of the right to the mother tongue of Azerbaijanis in Iran, political arrests, and persecutions, including the arrest of Abbas Lisani.

In March 2008, a rally was held by the Association of Iranian Azerbaijanis in front of the BBC building in London. The participants of the rally demanded the release of Abbas Lisani. On them, "30 million Azerbaijani Turks were repressed by the Iranian regime!", "Azerbaijani Turkish should be the official language in South Azerbaijan!", "Stop the torture of prisoners of conscience!" They held placards with the words During the 2-hour action, the participants distributed leaflets in English about the arrest of Abbas Lisani and the situation of South Azerbaijanis in Iran.

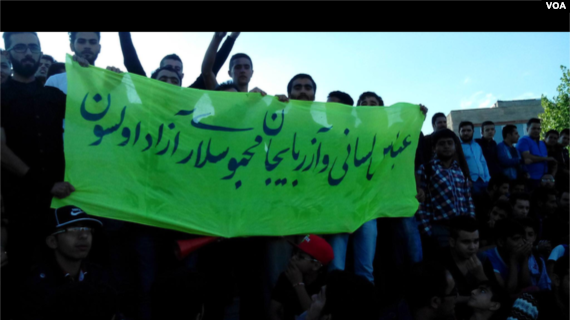
The fans of the Shahrdari team held a banner with the inscription "Free Abbas Lisani and the prisoners of Azerbaijan". 2015 year

On 29 August 2015, a football match was held in Ardabil at Takhti Stadium between Ardabil's "Shahrdari" team and Isfahan's "Giti Pasand" club. Ardabilly fans who came to the game chanted "May our country prosper – may Lisani be free" and demanded the freedom of Abbas Lisani. On 10 September 2015, Mustafa Parvin, Saleh Pichganli, Tovhid Amir Amini, Murtaza Parvin, and Meysam Colani were arrested by Iranian security forces during a football match at Takhti Stadium in Ardabil. The reason for this was that they raised placards with expressions supporting Abbas Lisani and other political prisoners and chanted national slogans during the game at the stadium. Each of them was sentenced to 3 months in prison and 30 lashes. According to the court's decision, 30 lashes should be given on the day of the end of the 3-month prison term, the sentence was carried out in the first days of the activists' entry.

2019, saw the publication of the book "Freedom's Struggle," compiling Abbas Lisani's poems, articles, court appearances, and interviews by a group of supporters.

To support Abbas Lisani, who started a hunger strike to protest his arrest in 2019, national activists started the "Support Abbas Lisani" campaign. On 4 February 2019, the chairman of the Azerbaijan Democracy and Welfare (ADR) Movement, Gubad Ibadoglu, demanded the release of Abbas Lisani and called on everyone to support him. On 5 February, the Musavat party issued a statement demanding the unconditional release of Abbas Lisani and all national activists held in Iranian prisons. Along with the party's statement, its president Arif Hajili also condemned the persecution of national activists in Iran and demanded the freedom of Abbas Lisani. On 7 February, the co-chairman of the World Congress of Azerbaijanis, Sabir Rustamkhanli, demanded the immediate release of Abbas Lisani and those unjustly arrested with him, and the fulfillment of the national, political, and economic demands of Azerbaijani Turks in Iran. On 10 February, security forces searched the homes of human rights defenders Murtaza Parvin, Mehdi Dustdar, and Rahim Nowruzi, as well as the workplaces of Ali Wasigi and Mazahir Maali, who supported the "Support Abbas Lisani" campaign.

On 10 July 2019, the Nationalist Youth Organization held a demonstration in front of the Iranian Embassy in Baku, advocating for the rights of Abbas Lisani and other activists who were in detention. Participants of the demonstration chanted slogans such as 'Freedom for our compatriots!', 'Southern Azerbaijan is not Iran!', 'Let Azerbaijan unite, let Tabriz be the capital!', and other slogans. They read out the manifesto of the demonstration in front of the embassy.

On 17 July 2019, activists from the Musavat Party attempted to hold a picket in front of the Iranian Embassy. The manifesto of the demonstration demanded the cessation of military cooperation between the Iranian government and Armenia, the cancellation of the joint arms production agreement, the release of Abbas Lisani and other activists, and an end to ethnic discrimination.

In March 2020, 161 national-cultural activists, including journalists, poets, researchers, writers, and civic activists, wrote a letter to Ibrahim Raisi, the head of Iran's judiciary, requesting the release of political prisoners due to the coronavirus threat. They specifically mentioned the names of 28 Azerbaijani political prisoners, including Abbas Lisani, in their appeal.

In June 2020, 'United for Iran,' a human rights defense group based in the United States, initiated a signature campaign for the release of Abbas Lisani.

In December 2020, in the city of Ardabil, slogans were written on the walls advocating for the release of political prisoners. Messages such as 'We are still unaware', 'Political prisoners saved us, they have been in custody for a long time, let's not forget them', 'Release the prisoners on furlough', 'Abbas Lisani is still banned from visits and phone calls', and 'The health of our political prisoners is our red line' were painted on the walls.

In May 2021, wall inscriptions demanding the release of political prisoners appeared on the streets of Ardabil. During that period, as elections approached in Iran, national activists wrote slogans on the walls such as 'We support the right to freedom for political prisoners,' 'We support Abbas Lisani,' and 'The elected representative of the Azerbaijani people is in prison.'

In August 2021, the UN's special rapporteur on human rights in Iran, Javid Rahman, presented his latest report on human rights violations in Iran to the UN General Assembly. In his 25-page report, he highlighted the targeting of Turkish citizens and civil society activists like Abbas Lisani and Alireza Farshi, who advocate for minority rights in Iranian Azerbaijan. He also provided information regarding Abbas Lisani's hunger strike in June 2021, along with that of seven other national activists.

== See also ==
- Alireza Farshi
- Said Matinpour
- Actions in support of Azerbaijan in Iran (2020)
