= Əmirvarlı =

- Location within Azerbaijan
- Coordinates: 39°16′49″N 47°04′59″E
- Country: Azerbaijan
- Rayon: Jabrayil
- Time zone: UTC+4 (AZT)
  - Summer (DST): UTC+5 (AZT)

Əmirvarlı (also, Amirvarly and Emirvarly) is a village in the Jabrayil Rayon of Azerbaijan. It was occupied by the Armenian forces in 1993. The Army of Azerbaijan recaptured the village on or around 19 October 2020.
