= İmambağı =

- Location within Azerbaijan
- Coordinates: 39°21′13″N 47°05′12″E
- Country: Azerbaijan
- District: Jabrayil
- Time zone: UTC+4 (AZT)
  - Summer (DST): UTC+5 (AZT)

İmambağı (Imambaghy) is a village in the Jabrayil District of Azerbaijan. On 20 October 2020, President of Azerbaijan Ilham Aliyev announced that Azerbaijani forces had recaptured the village in the 2020 Nagorno-Karabakh war.
