= Xələfli (village) =

- Location within Azerbaijan
- Coordinates: 39°25′15″N 46°57′40″E
- Country: Azerbaijan
- Rayon: Jabrayil
- Time zone: UTC+4 (AZT)
  - Summer (DST): UTC+5 (AZT)

Xələfli (also, Khalafli) is a village in the Jabrayil District in the south-west of Azerbaijan.
