= Ashiq Qurbani =

Azerbaijani poet

Qurbani
- Born: c. 1477; Iri
- Died: Iri
- Occupation: Ashik

Ashik Qurbani or Kurbani (Azerbaijani: Aşıq Qurbani) was an Azerbaijani ashik.

== Early life ==
Qurbani was born in about 1477 in Iri village (today Jabrayil District of Azerbaijan).

== Musician ==
He was a contemporary of Shah Ismail and may have served as a court musician. According to folk traditions, Qurbani became an ashik via divine intervention in a dream. In the dream, he sees a big palace and a beautiful maiden in the garden. The girl is looking at him. A Saint holds one of the girl's hands; a second Saint holds the other and puts a love potion into her hand. Qurbani opens his eyes while trying to embrace the girl, but realizes that it has all been a dream. Thus he falls in love with the maiden whose name was Perizat (Pari). This tradition is the basis of a famous ashik hikaye, known as "Qurbani and Pari".

== Compositions ==
Qurbani's compositions were handed down orally and are performed by every ashik. A famous qushma, titled Violet, starts with:

Başina mən dönüm ala göz Pəri, --- (O my dearest, my love, my beautiful green-eyed Pari)
Adətdir dərələr yaz bənəvşəni. --- (Custom bids us pluck violets when spring days begin)
Ağ nazik əlinən dər dəstə bağla, --- (With your tender white hand gather a nosegay,)
Tər buxaq altinə düz bənəvşəni... --- (Pin it under your dainty chin.....)

== See also ==
- Dirili Surkhay
