= Alireza Farshi =

Iranian-Azerbaijani national cultural activist

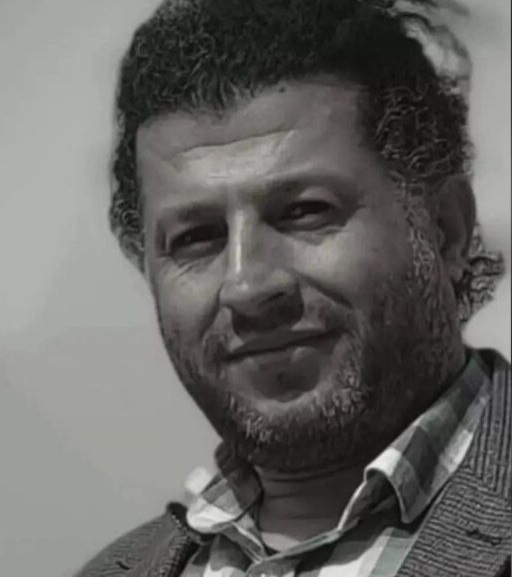
- Born: 17 October 1978 (age 47); Marand, East Azerbaijan, Iran
- Occupation: Computer engineer
- Known for: Political prisoner, human rights defender

Alireza Farshi is an Iranian Azerbaijani national cultural activist. He was arrested by Iranian security forces along with other national activists for attending the International Mother Language Day celebrations in Tehran on February 21, 2014. He was later sentenced to 15 years in prison and two years in exile in the city of Bagh-e Malek in Khuzestan province. Amnesty International has declared him a prisoner of conscience because there are no criminal elements in his activity, as well as because of the protection of human rights and the rights of the mother tongue and required his release with other organisations. He is also the founder of the "Kəndimiz" (English: Our Village) Foundation, which collects and delivers books for children to various regions and villages in Iranian Azerbaijan.

== About ==
=== Life and activities ===
Alireza Farshi was born in 1979 in Dizaj Yekan village of Marand. His father died in the Iran-Iraq war. He began his studies at Sharif University of Technology in 1998. He studied computer engineering. He later received a master's degree from Tehran University. While studying at the university, he worked at the editorial office of "Yol" journal, published in Azerbaijani Turkish at Tehran University. After graduating, he lived in Tabriz for a year. He later began teaching at Azad University in Julfa. In addition to his teaching activities, he established the “Our Village” Foundation, which collects and delivers books for children to various regions and villages in Iranian Azerbaijan. He personally participated in the delivery of books. During the years of its activity, “Our Village” Foundation has donated thousands of books to children living in dozens of settlements.

=== Arrest and subsequent activities ===
He was arrested in May 2009 with his wife, Sima Didar, during a protest in El Golu Square of Tabriz for education in mother tongue. Although the court sentenced them to one year in prison, the second instance court reduced their detention to six months. In 2010, he was fired from his teaching position at Azad University in Julfa. After being transferred to Tabriz prison, he was temporarily released on bail. He was arrested again in 2011 and transferred to Tabriz prison.

In 2014, he was arrested along with Akbar Azad, Behnam Sheikh, Hamid Manafi Nadarli, Mahmud Ojagli, Rustam Kazimpur, Mansur Fathi and Aziz Farshi for attending the International Mother Language Day ceremony in Tehran. He was later sentenced to 15 years in prison and two years in exile in Bagh Malik, Khuzestan Province. Two months after their arrests, activists Akbar Azad and Alireza Farshi, who were being held in a prison in Tehran, were transferred to the stricter 305th corps.

On September 22, 2021, Alireza Farshi announced that he would go on a three-day hunger strike to protest the cruel and unjust verdicts of judges in the courts of the Islamic Republic of Iran, as well as the deprivation of Turkish people from education in mother tongue in schools. Later, political prisoner Abbas Lisani also joined the rally in support of Alireza Farshi.

In November 2021, he wrote an open letter to court officials in connection with the deprivation of the right to leave. In his letter, he demanded that he be released on leave and treated outside the prison, explaining the severity of his illness, the need for eye surgery and his diagnosis of type 2 diabetes. He also criticized his imprisonment for attending a ceremony marking International Mother Language Day and for his work on the rights of the Turkish language and ethnicity under the law, noting that he was only given three days off during his 20-month imprisonment.

On December 12, 2021, Alireza Farshi, who was serving a sentence in the Great Tehran Prison, began a three-day hunger strike. In an open letter from prison, he said the hunger strike was in protest of environmental pollution, including the drying up of Lake Urmia, the dumping of waste into the Araz River, the living conditions of workers and teachers, unemployment in Azerbaijan, and illegal pressure on Azerbaijani national activists.

=== Protests against his arrest ===
Amnesty International has declared him a prisoner of conscience and demanded his immediate release because he has no criminal record and defends human rights and mother tongue rights.

In May 2021, the Erk-Azerbaijan Human Rights Society sent a letter to the UN entitled "Monitoring the situation of Azerbaijani cultural prisoners." In this letter, they expressed concern over the condition of Alireza Farshi. Alireza Farshi was diagnosed with diabetes during his imprisonment and his condition worsened due to lack of treatment. In addition, although his eyesight is impaired and his eyes need surgery, he has not got any chance for his treatment and surgery.

On July 5, 2021, national cultural activists distributed leaflets in the streets of Tabriz demanding the release of political prisoner Alireza Farshi. Activists pasted posters and leaflets with the slogans "Alireza Farshi, man is doomed to freedom", "Happy birthday to the national hero of the Azerbaijani Turkic nation, Father Babek" on the walls in most parts of Tabriz and distributed them among the population. In addition, on July 5, a rally was held in Marand in support of Alireza Farshi and against injustice against him. National-cultural activists of the city of Marand distributed posters "Alireza Farshi's life is in danger", "Azerbaijani political prisoners are our red line" and hung a banner on the city bridge.

On July 16, 2021, 18 human rights groups issued a joint statement in support of Alireza Farshi. In their statements, they noted that Alireza Farshi was subjected to cruel, inhuman and degrading treatment in prison and did not receive the medical care she needed. They called on the officials of the Islamic Republic of Iran to take the necessary steps to protect the life and health of Alireza Farshi and to provide him specialized medical care as needed. They also demanded the immediate and unconditional release of Alireza Farshi, as well as the trial of those who made him illegal accusations and ill-treatment.

In August 2021, the UN Special Rapporteur on Human Rights in Iran, Javid Rahman, submitted his next report on human rights violations in Iran to the UN General Assembly. He said in a 25-page report that Turkish civil society activists such as Abbas Lisani and Alireza Farshi in Iran Azerbaijan had been targeted for defending minority rights, and that Alireza Farshi had been physically abused and ill-treated in prison.

In October 2021, national cultural activists hung banners in the streets of Tabriz with the slogans "Freedom", "Alirza Farshi", "Man is doomed to freedom", "Give me your hand, expelled from the fly, I'm burning with longing - I've been lying in the dark for 43 years."
