= Həsənqaydı =

- Location within Azerbaijan
- Coordinates: 39°22′18″N 47°04′52″E
- Country: Azerbaijan
- District: Jabrayil
- Time zone: UTC+4 (AZT)
  - Summer (DST): UTC+5 (AZT)

Həsənqaydı (also, Hasangaidy and Hasangaydy) is a village in the Jabrayil District of Azerbaijan. On 20 October 2020, Azerbaijan President Ilham Aliyev claimed Azerbaijani forces had captured the village from the Republic of Artsakh, though this has not yet been corroborated by third-party sources.
