= Yuxarı Veysəlli =

- Location within Azerbaijan Location within Karabakh Economic Region
- Coordinates: 39°44′13″N 47°05′26″E
- Country: Azerbaijan
- District: Khojavend
- Time zone: UTC+4 (AZT)

Yuxarı Veysəlli (Yukhary Veysalli) is a former village in the current Khojavend District of Azerbaijan. Before its abolition, the village was part of the Veysalli Rural administrative division of the Fuzuli District. By the Law of the Republic of Azerbaijan dated December 5, 2023, Yuxari Veysalli was abolished, and its territory was transferred to the Khojavend District.

It was under the occupation of the Armenian forces of the self-proclaimed Republic of Artsakh since the First Nagorno-Karabakh war, until its recapture by the Azerbaijan Army on November 7, 2020, during the 2020 Nagorno-Karabakh war.
