= Daş Veysəlli =

- Location within Azerbaijan
- Coordinates: 39°22′06″N 47°01′46″E
- Country: Azerbaijan
- Rayon: Jabrayil
- Time zone: UTC+4 (AZT)
  - Summer (DST): UTC+5 (AZT)

Daş Veysəlli (also, Dashveysalli, Dashveysally, Dashveysaly, and Dash Veysalli) is a village in Jabrayil Rayon of Azerbaijan. On 20 October 2020 President of Azerbaijan Ilham Aliyev claimed Azerbaijani forces had captured the village from Republic of Artsakh, though this has not yet been corroborated by third-party sources. On 17th of December 2020, Azerbaijan defence ministry published video footage of the village, showing almost all buildings had been destroyed.
