= Qumlaq, Oghuz =

Qumlaq
- Municipality
- Location within Azerbaijan Location within Shaki-Zagatala Economic Region
- Coordinates: 41°01′27″N 47°28′58″E
- Country: Azerbaijan
- Rayon: Oghuz

Population
  - Total: 1,480
- Time zone: UTC+4 (AZT)
  - Summer (DST): UTC+5 (AZT)

Qumlaq (also, Kumlak and Kumlakh) is a village and municipality in the Oghuz Rayon of Azerbaijan. It has a population of 1,480. The municipality consists of the villages of Qumlaq and Hallavar.
