= Ardabil Bazaar =

Iranian national heritage site

Coordinates: 38°14′59″N 48°17′50″E

- بازار اردبیل
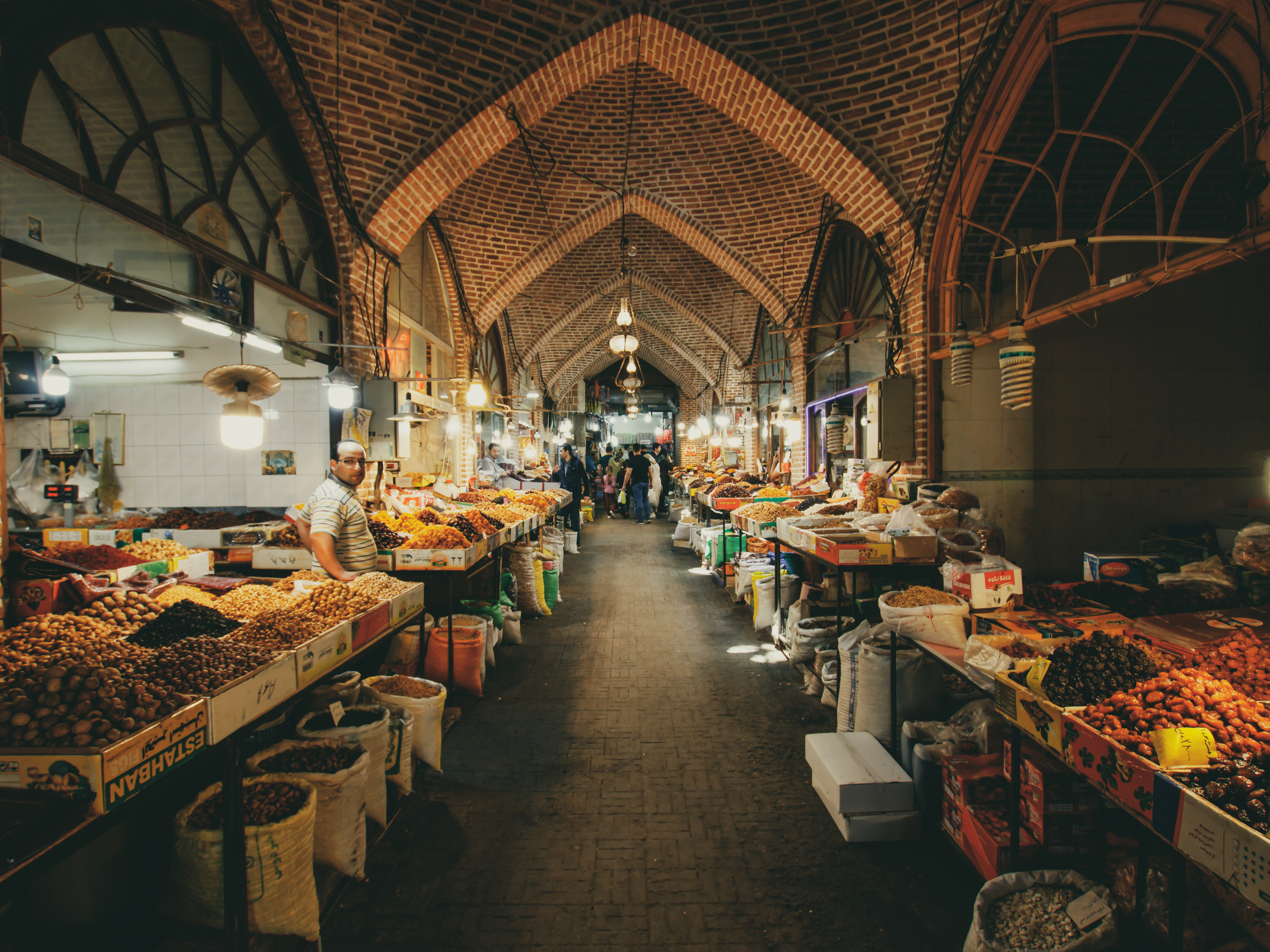
- Interactive map of the Ardabil Bazaar area

General information
- Location: Ardabil, Iran
- Completed: Safavid era

Ardabil Bazaar (Persian: بازار اردبیل) is a bazaar built during the Safavid era in Ardabil, north-western Iran.

In the 4th century, historians described the bazaar as a building in the shape of the cross with a domed ceiling. It was constructed during the Safavid era from the 16th to the 18th century and renovated during the Zand era in the 18th century.

Caravansaries and inns, owned by the estate of the Safavid dynasty shrine, and mosques, some of which were endowed by Ata-Malik Juvayni (1226–1283) for the Shaikh Safi al-Din Shrine, are located in and around the Ardabil Bazaar. The proceeds from the many shops, bathhouses and inns in the bazaar that are owned by the estate of the shrine are used for the shrine's upkeep.

== Gallery ==
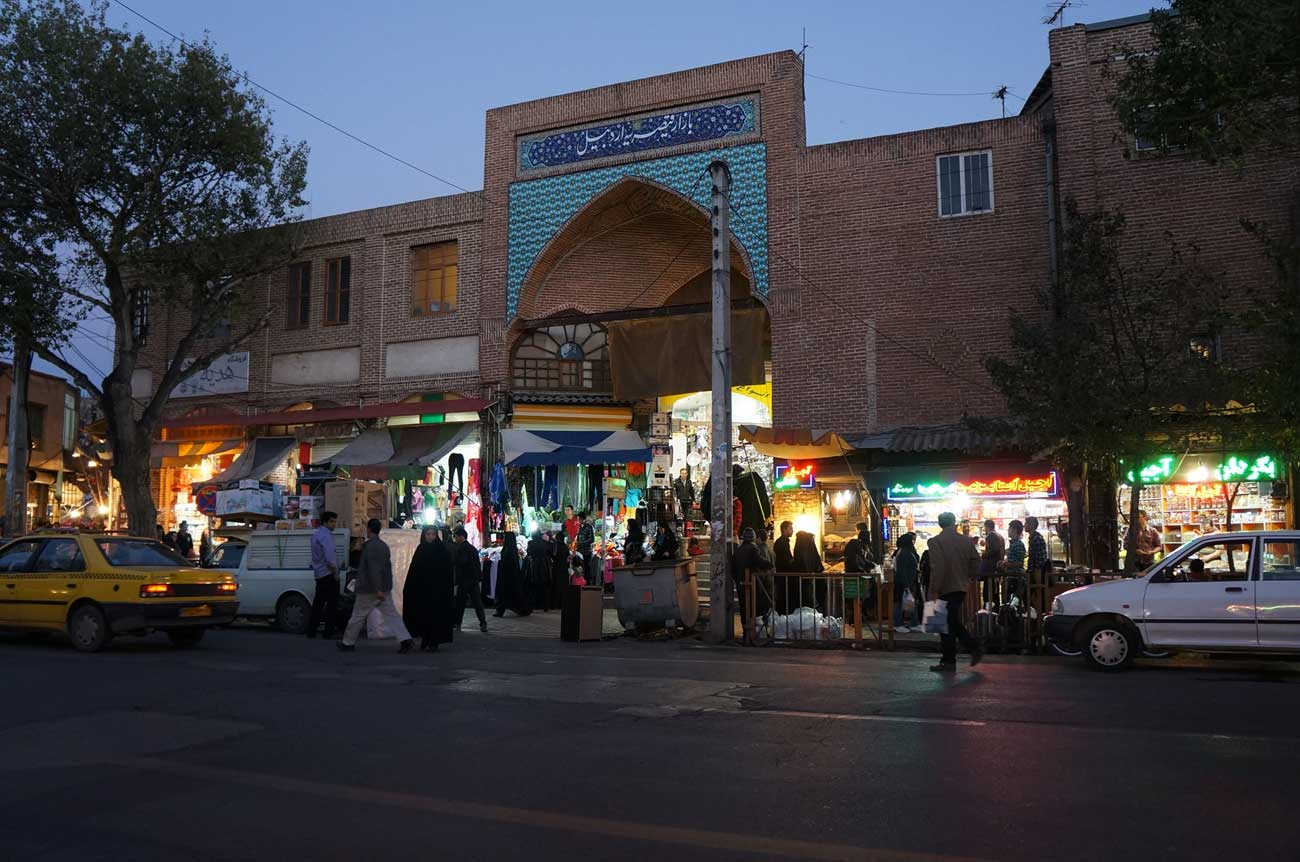

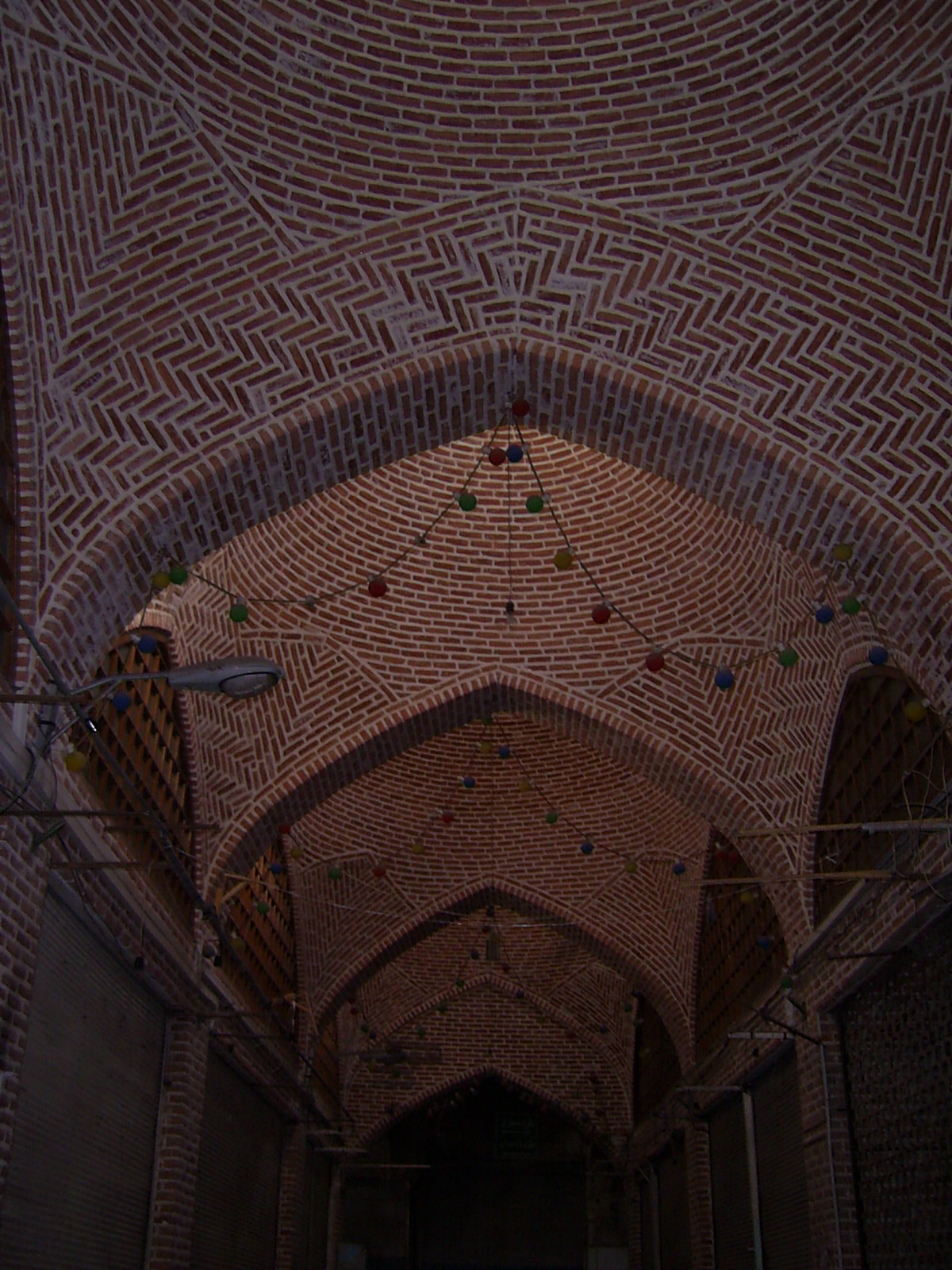

== See also ==
- Economy of Iran
- Iranian architecture
