= Hüseynalılar, Barda =

Coordinates: 40°18′38″N 47°14′30″E

Hüseynalılar (also, Hüseynallar) is a village and municipality in the Barda Rayon of Azerbaijan. It has a population of 725.
