= Jabrayil District =

District in southwestern Azerbaijan

Coordinates: 39°18′N 47°00′E

- District
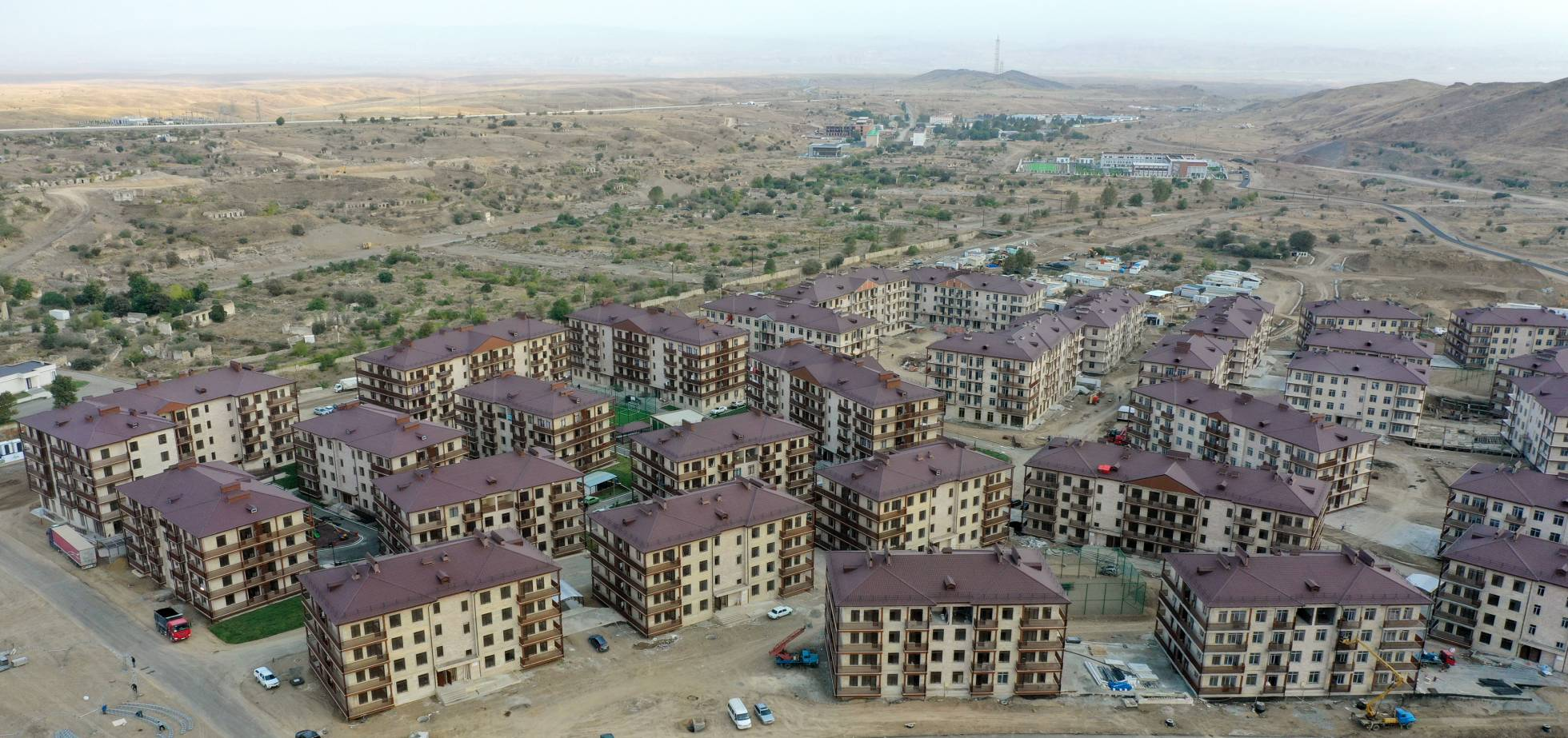

- Map of Azerbaijan showing Jabrayil District
- Country: Azerbaijan
- Region: East Zangezur
- Established: 8 August 1930
- Capital: Jabrayil (nominal); Jojug Marjanly (de facto)
- Settlements: 93

Government
  - Governor: Kamal Hasanov

Area
  - Total: 1,050 km^{2} (410 sq mi)

Population (2020)
  - Total: 81,700 (nominal)
  - Density: 77.8/km^{2} (202/sq mi)
- Time zone: UTC+4 (AZT)
- Postal code: 1400
- Website: cabrail-ih.gov.az

Jabrayil District (Azerbaijani: Cəbrayıl rayonu) is one of the 66 districts of Azerbaijan. It is located in the south-west of the country and belongs to the East Zangezur Economic Region. The district borders the districts of Khojavend, Fuzuli, Qubadli, Zangilan, and the Islamic Republic of Iran.

Its capital is Jabrayil, however since the city is completely ruined following its occupation by ethnic Armenian forces, the current de facto capital is Jojug Marjanly until Jabrayil is rebuilt. As of 2020, the district had a nominal population of 81,700.

== Etymology ==
The name of Jabrayil was taken from the name of the village Jabrayil that was the centre of the region. Father Jabrayil, who was the founder of the village Jabrayil, was one of the closes of the ruler by name Sultan Ahmed who lived in the 8th century and the territories between Zuyaret Mountain and the river Araz belonged to Father Jabrayil and his sons.

== History ==
In pre-modern times, the current territory of Jabrayil District is believed to have formed the southern part of the canton (gavaṛ) of Myus Haband (known as Belukan or Dizak in the medieval era) of the historic Armenian province of Artsakh. Historian Samvel Karapetyan considers it likely that most of the area's Armenian population had left by the early 18th century. In the tsarist era, Jabrayil District (which was a part of the Jebrail Uyezd of the Elisabethpol Governorate) was mainly populated by nomadic or semi-nomadic Turkic-speakers (i.e. Azerbaijanis), as well as a minority of sedentary Armenians and a small number of Russian Molokan settlers. The nomadic population was settled in the Soviet period.

=== Armenian occupation ===
The territory was occupied by Armenian forces on August 23, 1993, during the First Nagorno-Karabakh War. It was administrated as a part of Hadrut Province of the self-proclaimed Nagorno-Karabakh Republic, save for the village of Jojug Marjanly, which was recaptured on January 6, 1994 during Operation Horadiz. This village was the provisional centre of this district until the recapture of Jabrayil in 2020.

The region with 1,050 square km area, including 72 secondary schools, eight hospitals, five mosques, two museums, 120 historic monuments, 149 cultural centres and about 100 villages that remained in the area were totally destroyed.

=== Return to Azerbaijani control ===
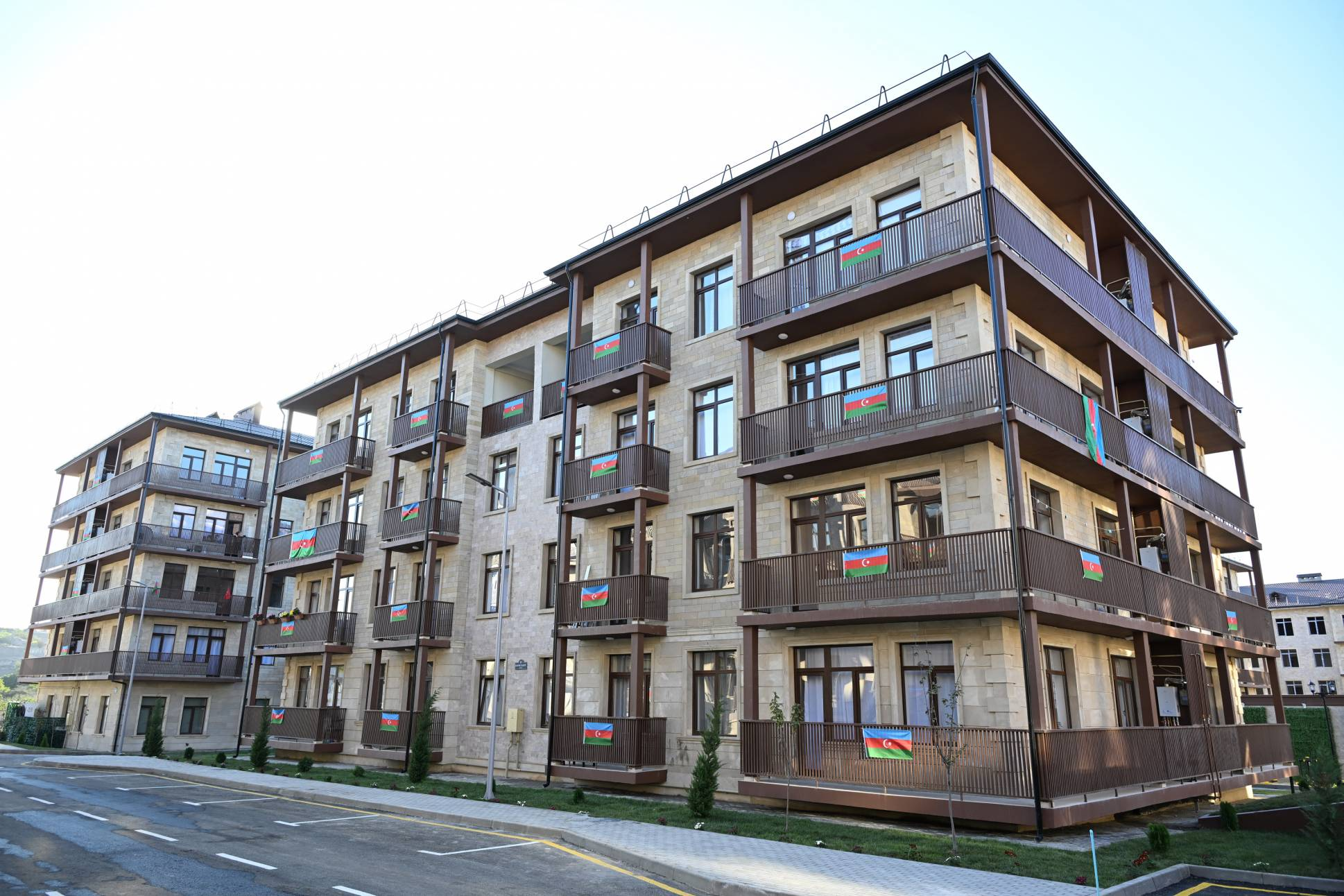
The city of Jabrayil, October 2024.

During the 2020 Nagorno-Karabakh conflict, on October 9, 2020, the Azerbaijani Ministry of Defence announced the recapture of the district's central town, Jabrayil, from Armenian forces. On October 20, 2020, Azerbaijani President Ilham Aliyev announced the recapture of Safarsha, Hesengaydi, Fuganli, Imambaghi, Dash Veysalli, Aghtepe and Yarakhmedli villages of Jabrayil district. On October 21–22, 2020, 9 more villages of the district were recaptured, according to Azerbaijani sources. In November 2020, Azerishiq announced that it had begun supplying electricity to the district.

== Administrative structure ==
According to the State Statistics Committee of Azerbaijan Republic as of 2013, there is 1 city, 4 settlements and 92 villages in the district which has a territory of 1050 km^{2}.

== Demographics ==
Historical population
| Year | Population | ±% |
|---|---|---|
| 1897 | 66,360 | — |
| 1926 | 75,371 | +13.6% |
| 1939 | 23,502 | −68.8% |
| 1959 | 26,377 | +12.2% |
| 1970 | 37,227 | +41.1% |
| 1979 | 43,047 | +15.6% |
| 1989 | 49,156 | +14.2% |
| 1999 | 59,318 | +20.7% |
| 2009 | 70,585 | +19.0% |
Note: Population size may be affected by changes in administrative divisions. Source: www.ethno-kavkaz.narod.ru & www.pop-stat.mashke.org

At the time of the 1979 Soviet census, the ethnic makeup of the district's population whose ethnicity was known (43,047 people) was:

- Azerbaijanis: 42,415 (98.5%)
- Russians: 434 (1%)
- Armenians: 41 (0.1%)
- Others: 157 (0.4%)

== Notable natives ==
- Ashiq Qurbani (1477–1???) – poet and folk singer
- Ashiq Peri (1811–1847) – Azerbaijani poet and folk singer
- Teymur Guliyev – Soviet Azerbaijani politician
- Ramil Safarov – Azerbaijani officer, lieutenant colonel
- Jamil Ahmadov – Azerbaijani Red Army lieutenant and a Hero of the Soviet Union
- Ali S. Hasanov – Azerbaijani politician, former Deputy Prime Minister of Azerbaijan
- Elman Rustamov – a Azerbaijani politician
- Taleh Kazimov – Governor of the Central Bank of the Republic of Azerbaijan
- Nasimi Aghayev – Azerbaijani diplomat
- Ashraf Huseynov – Azerbaijani mathematician
- Majnun Mammadov – Azerbaijani politician, Minister of Agriculture of Azerbaijan since 2023
- Javid Huseynov – Azerbaijani football manager and former player

== See also ==
- Khudafarin Bridges
- Armenian-occupied territories surrounding Nagorno-Karabakh
