= Kondalanchay Reservoirs Complex =

Reservoir system in Fuzuli District, Azerbaijan

Coordinates: 39.610°N 47.184°E

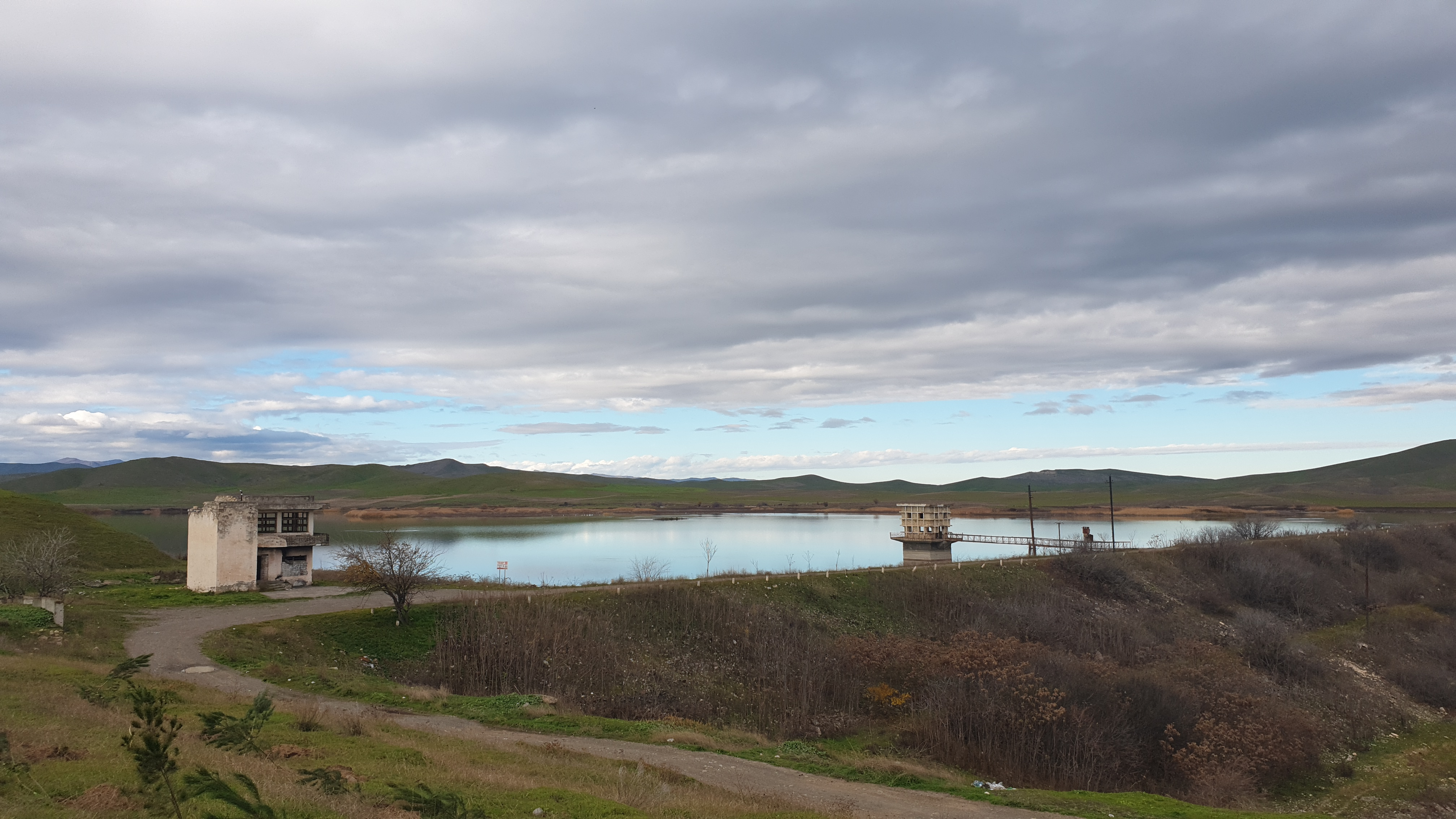
- Interactive map of Kondalanchay Reservoirs Complex
- Official name: Azerbaijani: Köndələnçay su anbarları kompleksi
- Country: Azerbaijan
- Location: Fuzuli District
- Purpose: Irrigation
- Status: In operation

Dam and spillways
- Impounds: Kondalanchay

Kondalanchay Reservoirs Complex (Azerbaijani: Köndələnçay su anbarları kompleksi) is a system of reservoirs on the Kondalanchay river in the Fuzuli District of Azerbaijan. The complex includes the Kondalanchay-1 reservoir, the Kondalanchay-2 reservoir, and the Ashagi (Lower) Kondalanchay reservoir (Azerbaijani: Aşağı Köndələnçay).

The reservoirs are located across the territories of the villages of Dovlatyarli, Yukhari Yaghlivand and Mirzajamalli.

== History ==
Following the recapture of Fuzuli in 2020 as a result of Second Karabakh War, the complex—including the Ashagi Kondalanchay reservoir—was included in a restoration programme. In 2021, water from the Ashagi Kondalanchay reservoir began to be used again for irrigation in several settlements.

On 10 May 2024, the restored Kondalanchay Reservoirs Complex was reopened. The project is intended to improve irrigation on more than 6,000 hectares of land in Fuzuli District (reported at about 6,200 hectares in some coverage).

In 2024, after a period of intensive rainfall, total stored water was reported at about 11.8 million m³, including around 2.1 million m³ in Kondalanchay-1, 1.7 million m³ in Kondalanchay-2, and 8 million m³ in Ashagi Kondalanchay.

== Technical characteristics ==
=== Kondalanchay-1 reservoir ===
The Kondalanchay-1 reservoir was commissioned in 1962. Its total capacity is reported as 3.9 million m³, with a useful volume of 3.6 million m³, and a dam height of 14 m.

=== Kondalanchay-2 reservoir ===
The Kondalanchay-2 reservoir was commissioned in 1951. Its total capacity is reported as 2.1 million m³, with a useful volume of 1.6 million m³, and a dam height of 23.35 m.

=== Ashagi Kondalanchay reservoir ===
The Ashagi Kondalanchay reservoir (Azerbaijani: Aşağı Köndələnçay) was commissioned in 1980. Its total capacity is reported as 9.5 million m³, with a useful volume of 9.0 million m³, and a dam height of 25 m. Water is also directed into the reservoir via an intake structure built on the Guruchay river.
