= Aghabala Abdullayev =

Aghabala Abdullayev Ağabala Abdullayev
- Born: Ağabala Məmmədbağır oğlu Abdullayev; 1910; Charali, Zangezursky Uyezd, Elisabethpol Governorate, Russian Empire
- Origin: Azerbaijani
- Died: October 10, 1976 (aged 65–66) Fuzuli District, Azerbaijan SSR, USSR
- Genre: mugham
- Occupation: khananda
- Instrument: dayereh

Aghabala Abdullayev (Azerbaijani: Ağabala Abdullayev, 1910 — 10 October 1976) was an Azerbaijani khananda.

== Biography ==
Aghabala Abdullayev was born in 1910, in the village of Charali. At the age of 12, he entered the first class of a rural youth school in Karyagino. He apprenticed in the shop of Rza, a seamstress before he opened his own shop.

In 1927, Bulbul, Ismayil Eloghlu and Murshud Hashimli heard the voice of Aghabala Abdullayev and entered the store. They appreciated his voice. Bulbul entrusted Aghabala to M.Hashimli, who was the club manager at Karyagin. After working in the shop during the day, Abdullayev participated in events in the evenings, and began to play episodic roles in choir and performances.

In 1930, Topasha Ahmadov, garmon-player, who used to collect money, bought a dayereh for Aghabala, and for the first time took him to a wedding in the village of Gedzhagozlu. Since then, A.Abdullayev participated in the wedding festivities of the near and far villages.

While Agabala learned stage techniques from J.Vazirov and M.Hashimli, he learned the secrets of mugham singing from Seyid Shushinski.

On the day of the Great Patriotic War started, the collective, that Aghabala is a member of, had been performing in Kapan. A large part of the collective was mobilized into the army. Aghabala and his friend J.Jafarov set up a group of young people and often gave concerts in front of conscripts. Because the theater director went to war, director Jalil Baghdadbeyov was sent from Baku to the collective. In a short span of time, he prepared several war-related performances. Aghabala was an assistant director in those works.

Aghabala Abdullayev died on October 10, 1976.

== Creativity ==
Aghabala made various stage appearances in the Karyagin club. Of these characters, Kerem's father's role in the "Asli and Kerem" opera is particularly noteworthy.

In 1933-1937, A.Abdullayev skillfully played the role of Majnun's father in "Leyli and Majnun", father of Kerem in "Asli and Kerem", Garib in "Ashig Garib" and Suleyman in "Arshin Mal Alan". After the opening of the "kolkhoz-sovkhoz" theater in Karyagin in 1938, A.Abdullayev also participated in the theater and performed in Baku, Imishli, Aghjabadi, Jabrayil, Zangilan and other regions.

After his departure from the army, Murshud Hashimli worked on operas in a new version. In these operas, khananda created roles for Majnun, Garib, Asgar, Kerem, and Sarvar. On September 27, 1953, A. Abdullayev performed a large concert at Azerbaijan State Philharmonic Hall in Baku. After the concert, Samad Vurgun and Suleyman Rustam sincerely congratulated Abdullayev on his successful performance at the Philharmonic Hall and advised him to stay in Baku. The singer refused to stay in Baku.

In 1956, khananda met with musicologist Ahmad Bakikhanov in Baku, and went to the Radio Broadcasting Office with his invitation and recorded the "Rast", "Zabul" mughams and "Shamama" song. The commission, which listened to the tape, named A.Abdullayev the khananda of the first class. Since then the well-known singer has performed in various cities and regions of Azerbaijan. He performed in Baku on April 17–18, 1963, on April 19 in Sumqayit and on April 20 at Azerbaijan Medical University.

Abdullayev worked hard in bringing up well-known singers as Islam Rzayev, Suleyman Abdullayev, Teymur Mustafayev, Murshud Mammadov, T.Musayev, Y.Aliyev and many others. Aghabala Abdullayev has occasionally recorded tapes of "Rast", "Segah-Zabul" mughams, "Arazbary", "Karabakh Shikastasi" rhythmic mughams, and "Shamama", "Guloghlan", "Gachag Nabi" songs.
