= Dilağarda =

Dilağarda or Dilagarda or Dilagorda or Dulagarda may refer to:

- Araz Dilagarda, Azerbaijan
- Dilağarda, Beylagan, Azerbaijan
- Dilağarda, Fizuli, Azerbaijan
- Qobu Dilağarda, Azerbaijan
