= Gandab Guliyeva =

Azerbaijani actress, singer

Gandab Guliyeva Qəndab Quliyeva
- Born: August 10, 1949; Dilagharda, Fuzuli District, Azerbaijan SSR, USSR
- Died: June 26, 2017 (aged 67); Baku, Azerbaijan
- Occupation(s): actress, singer

Gandab Habib gizi Guliyeva (Azerbaijani: Qəndab Həbib qızı Quliyeva, August 10, 1949 – June 26, 2017) was an Azerbaijani actress, singer, People's Artiste of Azerbaijan (1992).

== Biography ==
Gandab Guliyeva was born on August 10, 1949, in Fuzuli District. In 1976–1980, she studied at the Azerbaijan State Music School, in 1991–1996, at the Azerbaijan State University of Culture and Arts. In 1981, she worked as a soloist at the Azerbaijan State Opera and Ballet Theater.

Gandab Guliyeva toured many foreign countries—Germany, Canada, Japan, France, Sweden, Turkey, Iran, Iraq, and developed the art of Azerbaijani mugham. Khananda's repertoire includes mugham dastgahs and classifications. Her recordings of "Kharij Segah", "Shahnaz", "Mahur-Hindi", "Bayati-Shiraz", "Shur" mughams are stored in the AzTR Foundation. The recording of "Chahargah" mugham performed by Khananden was included in the "Mugham Anthology" CD in France.

Gandab Guliyeva died on June 26, 2017.

== Awards ==
- People's Artiste of Azerbaijan November 18, 1992
- Honored Artist of the Azerbaijan SSR
