= Yağləvənd =

Yağləvənd or Yaglevend or Yaglyvend may refer to:

- Aşağı Yağləvənd, Azerbaijan
- Yuxarı Yağlıvənd
- Yaglivend, Azerbaijan
