= Aybasanlı =

Aybasanlı or Aybasanly may refer to:

- Aşağı Aybasanlı, Azerbaijan ("Lower Aybasanlı")
- Yuxarı Aybasanlı, Azerbaijan ("Upper Aybasanlı")
