= Rəfədinli =

Rəfədinli or Rafadely or Rafadinli may refer to:

- Aşağı Rəfədinli, Azerbaijan
- Yuxarı Rəfədinli, Azerbaijan
