= Əbdürrəhmanlı =

Əbdürrəhmanlı or Abdurakhmanly may refer to:

- Aşağı Əbdürrəhmanlı, Azerbaijan
- Yuxarı Əbdürrəhmanlı, Azerbaijan
