= Kürdmahmudlu, Fizuli =

Kürdmahmudlu, Fizuli may refer to:

- Aşağı Kürdmahmudlu, Azerbaijan
- Yuxarı Kürdmahmudlu, Azerbaijan
