= Tengku Abdul Rahman =

Tengku Abdul Rahman or Tuanku Abdul Rahman or Tunku Abdul Rahman may refer to:

- Abdul Rahman (Sultan of Johor), Sultan of Johor when Singapore was founded in 1819
- Tuanku Abdul Rahman (1895 – 1960), first Yang di-Pertuan Agong, the Malaysian king and the Yang di-Pertuan Besar of the Malaysian state of Negeri Sembilan
- Tunku Abdul Rahman (1903 – 1990), first prime minister of Malaysia, prime minister of Federation of Malaya and also president of UMNO
- Tunku Abdul Rahman (1933–1989), younger brother of Sultan Iskandar of Johor, who also served as crown prince of Johor from 1961 to 1981
- Tunku Abdul Rahman Hassanal Jeffri (born 1993), 4th son of the Sultan of Johor, Sultan Ibrahim Ismail

== See also ==
- Tuanku Abdul Rahman Stadium
- KD Tunku Abdul Rahman, a submarine of the Royal Malaysian Navy
- Jalan Tuanku Abdul Rahman, a road in Kuala Lumpur, Malaysia
- Universiti Tunku Abdul Rahman
- Tunku Abdul Rahman College
- Tunku Abdul Rahman National Park
- Sekolah Tuanku Abdul Rahman
- Tunku Abdul Rahman Foundation
- Abdul Rahman (disambiguation)
- Malay styles and titles: Tengku, Tuanku and Tunku are royal titles similar to Prince/Princess
