= Aghabala =

Aghabala is a given name. Notable people with the name include:

- Aghabala Abdullayev (1910–1976), Azerbaijani khananda
- Aghabala Aghasaid oghlu (1860–1928), Azerbaijani singer
- Aghabala Ramazanov (born 1993), Azerbaijani footballer
