= Zargyar =

Zargyar may refer to:

- Araz Zargyar, Azerbaijan
- Zərgər, Azerbaijan
