= Zobucuq =

Zobucuq could refer to the following places in the Fuzuli District of Azerbaijan:

- Birinci Zobucuq
- Beşinci Zobucuq
