= Abdur Rahman (disambiguation) =

Abd al-Rahman is a masculine Muslim name. Abdur Rahman, Abdur Rehman, Abdr Rahman, Abdul Rahman, Abdul Rehman or variants may also refer to:

== Education ==
- B. S. Abdur Rahman University, a private university in Chennai, India
- Princess Nora bint Abdul Rahman University, a women's university in Riyadh, Saudi Arabia
- Sekolah Tuanku Abdul Rahman, a boys' secondary school in Ipoh, Malaysia
- Tunku Abdul Rahman College, a management and technology university in Kuala Lumpur, Malaysia
- Tunku Abdul Rahman Foundation, a Malaysian nonprofit that recognises and encourages youth development
- Universiti Tunku Abdul Rahman, a research university in Kampar, Malaysia

== Places ==
- Abdul Rachman Saleh Airport, a commercial airport in Malang, Indonesia
- Abdu Rahiman Nagar, a town in Kerala, India
- Aşağı Əbdürrəhmanlı (Ashaga-Abdurakhmanly), an uninhabited village in the Fuzuli District, Azerbaijan
- Menzel Abderrahmane, a town in Bizerte, Tunisia
- Sidi Abdel Rahman, a coastal village in Matrouh, Egypt
- Sidi Abderrahmane, Chlef, a town in Chlef, Algeria
- Yuxarı Əbdürrəhmanlı (Yukhary Abdurrahmanly), an uninhabited village in the Fuzuli District, Azerbaijan

== Other uses ==
- Abdul Rahman Mosque, the largest mosque in Kabul, Afghanistan
- Datuk Patinggi Haji Abdul Rahman Bridge, a bridge crossing the Sarawak River in Kuching, Malaysia
- Expedition of Abdur Rahman bin Auf, a missionary expedition to spread Islam in Saudi Arabia
- Jalan Tuanku Abdul Rahman, a road in Kuala Lumpur, Malaysia
- KD Tunku Abdul Rahman, a submarine of the Royal Malaysian Navy
- Tuanku Abdul Rahman Stadium, a multi-purpose stadium in Paroi, Malaysia
- Tunku Abdul Rahman National Park, a park spread across four Malaysian islands
