= Anvar Chingizoglu =

Azerbaijani historian, ethnologist and genealogist (1962–2022)

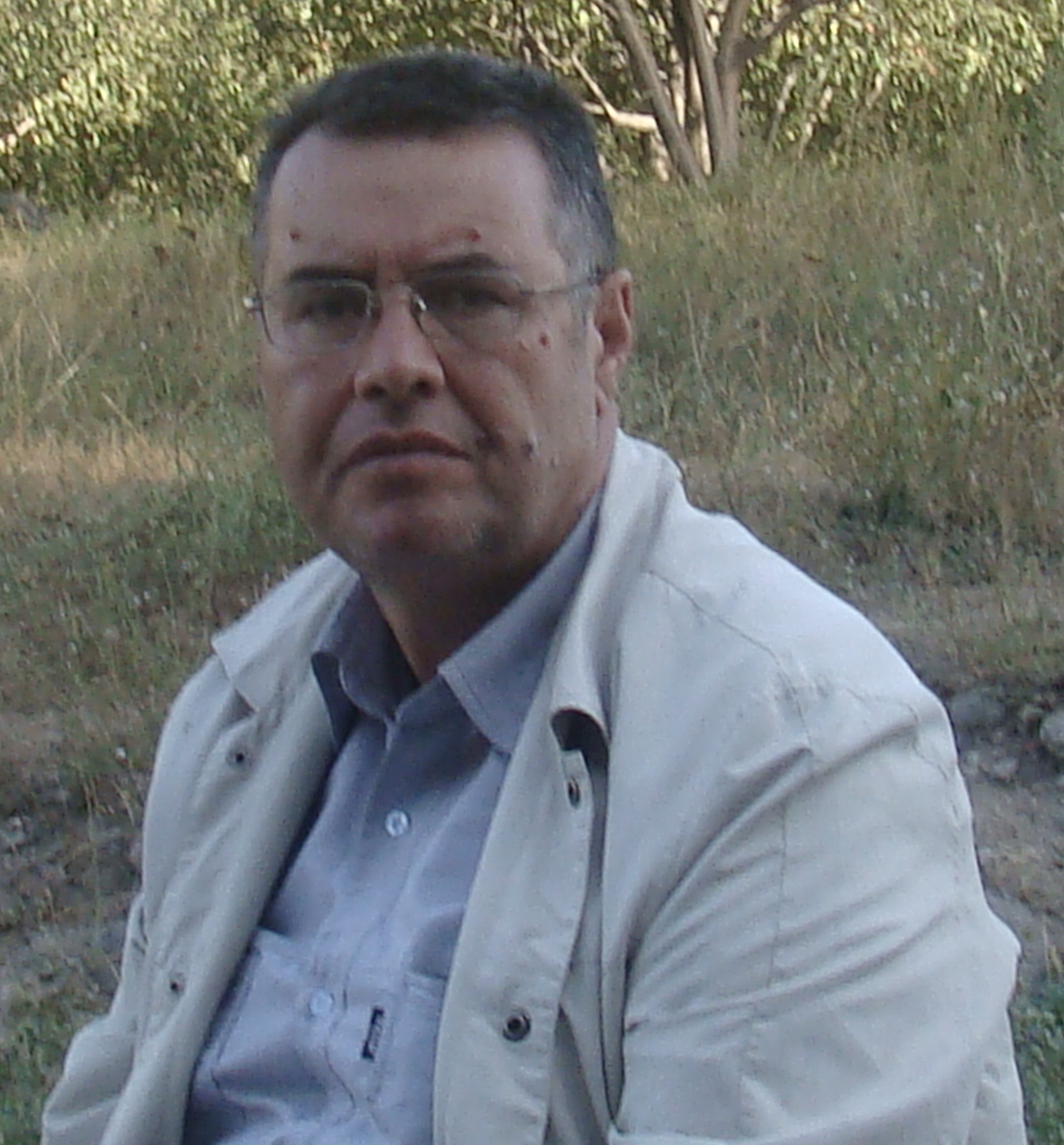
- Chingizoglu in 2013
- Born: Anvar Farajov; 10 May 1962; Jabrayil District, Azerbaijan SSR, USSR
- Died: 10 July 2022 (aged 60); Baku, Azerbaijan
- Occupations: Historian; ethnologist; genealogist

Anvar Chingizoglu Farajov (Azerbaijani: Ənvər Çingizoğlu Fərəcov; 10 May 1962 – 10 July 2022) was an Azerbaijani historian, ethnologist and genealogist who mostly specialized in the history and genealogies of medieval Azerbaijan, Iran and the Ottoman Empire.

== Life ==
Anvar Chingizoglu was born in the town of Jabrail in Azerbaijan. His father was originally from Aşağı Yağləvənd village of Fizuli Rayon of Azerbaijan. In 1990, he graduated from the faculty of journalism Azerbaijan State University. Chingizoglu worked for the newspaper "Araz" (Aras, in 1990–1993). He was charged as a redactor to Azərbaycan Televiziya və Radio verilişləri Qapalı Səhmdar Cəmiyyəti. He later started publishing about Azerbaijan's history and genealogy.

Chingizoglu was interested in geopolitics, as well as the origin and ethnic structure of Turkic peoples, particularly of the Afshar people. He wrote three monographs on the history of the Afshar people, namely Afshar tribe (2008), Hossein Qholi Khan Gasimlu-Avshar (2012), Fath-Ali Khan Arashlu-Afshar (2014) and Afshar Culture (2014).

He was the author of 70 books and 293 printed scholarly publications.

He was an author of the documentary films "Afshars", "Khurshidbanu Natavan", "Mir Mohsun Navvab", "Kamina".

== Bibliography ==
=== In Azerbaijani ===
- Hacılılar ("Hajilu tribe"), Baku, 2004.
- Səfikürdlülər ("Safikyurdlu"), Baku, 2005.
- Qarabağ xanlığı ("Karabakh Khanate"), Baku, 2008.
- Qacar kəndi və qacarlar (Qajar village and Qajars), Baku, 2008.
- Avşarlar ("Afshar tribe"), Baku, 2008.
- Zülqədər eli ("Zulkadir tribe"), Baku, 2011.
- Qaradağ xanlığı ("Karadagh khanate"), Baku, 2011.
- Şəmşəddil sultanlığı ("Shamshaddil Sultanate"), Baku, 2013.
- Baharlılar ("Baharlus"), Baku, 2013.
- Püsyan eli ("Pessian tribe"), Baku, 2013.
- Sərab xanlığı ("Sarab Khanate"), Baku, 2013.
- Urmiya xanlığı ("Urmia Khanate"), Baku, 2013.
- Marağa xanlığı ("Maragheh Khanate"), Baku, 2013.
- Ərdəbil xanlığı ("Ardabil Khanate"), Baku, 2014.
- Cavanşir eli:Sarıcalılar ("Javanshir tribe: Sarujalins"), Baku, 2015.
- Zəncan xanlığı ("Zanjan Khanate"), Baku, 2015.
- Xalxal xanlığı ("Khalkhal Khanate"), Baku, 2016.
- Marağa tarixi ("History Maragheh"), Baku, 2016.
- Qəzvin tarixi ("History Qazvin"), Baku, 2016.
- Qazaxlar ("Kazakhs"), Baku, 2017.
- Maku xanlığı ("Maku Khanate"), Baku, 2019.

=== In Persian ===
- تاریخ ایل افشار ("History of Afshar tribe"), Urmia, 2016.

== Awards ==
- Honored Cultural Worker of Azerbaijan, 2019.
