= Seyidəhmədli =

Seyidəhmədli or Seyd-Akhmedly or Seidakhmedli may refer to:

- Aşağı Seyidəhmədli, Azerbaijan
- Yuxarı Seyidəhmədli, Azerbaijan
