= Zargyar Vtoroye =

Zargyar Vtoroye may refer to:

- Araz Zargyar, Azerbaijan
- Zərgər, Azerbaijan
