= Yal Pirəhmədli =

- Location within Azerbaijan Location within Karabakh Economic Region
- Coordinates: 39°31′38″N 47°08′45″E
- Country: Azerbaijan
- District: Fuzuli
- Time zone: UTC+4 (AZT)

Yal Pirəhmədli (Yal Pirahmadli) is a village in the Fuzuli District of Azerbaijan.
