= Saracıq =

- Location within Azerbaijan Location within Karabakh Economic Region
- Coordinates: 39°29′15.4″N 47°07′08.4″E
- Country: Azerbaijan
- District: Fuzuli
- Time zone: UTC+4 (AZT)
  - Summer (DST): UTC+5 (AZT)

Saracıq is a village in the Fuzuli District of Azerbaijan.
