= Xələfşə =

- Location within Azerbaijan Location within Karabakh Economic Region
- Coordinates: 39°33′09″N 47°06′43″E
- Country: Azerbaijan
- District: Fuzuli
- Time zone: UTC+4 (AZT)

Xələfşə (Khalafsha) is a village in the Fuzuli District of Azerbaijan.
