= Fuzuli State Drama Theatre =

Coordinates: 39.45055°N 47.33341°E

The Fuzuli State Drama Theatre (Azerbaijani: Füzuli Dövlət Dram Teatrı) is a professional state drama theatre operating in the Fuzuli District of Azerbaijan.

== History ==
The first professional theatre in the city of Fuzuli (known as Karyagino until 1959) was the Karyagino Collective Farmers' Theatre, established in 1930. In 1943, it received the status of a state drama theatre. However, in 1949, as part of the global transition of Soviet drama theatres to self-financing, the theatre was closed down. A new chapter began in 1961 when a folk theatre was founded, uniting 37 of the most talented amateur actors from the previous theatre company.

In 1989, the Fuzuli Drama Theatre was officially re-established following a decree from the Cabinet of Ministers of the Azerbaijan SSR. It regained its status as a state theatre, and the historic building, located at the intersection of Bina and Khanlar Streets, where it operated in the 1940s, was returned to the theatre. Vagif Valiyev, the former director of the Fuzuli District House of Culture, became its new administrative director, with Agil Novruzov appointed as the stage director.

The turbulent events of 1992, stemming from the Karabakh conflict, prompted the theatre's relocation to the town of Horadiz in the Fuzuli District. Subsequently, due to the area transforming into a combat zone, the theatre was temporarily evacuated to Sumgayit. Its original building in Fuzuli, like many others, fell victim to destruction. Since Fuzuli remained under Armenian control after the First Karabakh War and until the end of the Second Karabakh War, the theatre continued its activities in Sumgayit, housed in the building of the Samad Vurgun Palace of Culture. In 2003, the theatre once again moved, this time to Horadiz, which remained under Azerbaijani control and become the temporary administrative centre of the Fuzuli District. There, the theatre found a new home in the building of a local community centre. In 2015, by the decree issued by the Ministry of Culture and Tourism, the community centre building was renovated and allocated to the theatre for unlimited use.

During the Armenian occupation of Fuzuli, the Fuzuli State Drama Theater undertook tours across various regions of Azerbaijan and participated in various national festivals. These included the National Classics Festival in 1999, commemorating the 125th anniversary of Azerbaijani theatre, the Üfüq XXI Festival of One-Man Performances in 2000 and the National Theatre Festival in 2010.
