= Murtuzalılar =

- Location within Azerbaijan Location within Karabakh Economic Region
- Coordinates: 39°33′26.3″N 47°33′08.8″E
- Country: Azerbaijan
- District: Fuzuli
- Time zone: UTC+4 (AZT)
  - Summer (DST): UTC+5 (AZT)

Murtuzalılar (Murtuzalylar) is a village in the Fuzuli District of Azerbaijan.
