= Islam Rzayev =

Azerbaijani singer

Islam Rzayev Azerbaijani: İslam Rzayev
- Born: Rzayev İslam Tapdıq oğlu November 11, 1934; Sardarli, Fuzuli, Azerbaijan SSR, Transcaucasian SFSR, USSR
- Origin: Azerbaijani
- Died: January 26, 2008 (aged 73) Baku, Azerbaijan
- Genres: mugham
- Occupations: singer
- Years active: 1956–2008
- awards

Islam Rzayev (Azerbaijani: İslam Rzayev, 11 November 1934 – 26 January 2008) was an Azerbaijani singer, People's Artist of the Azerbaijan SSR.

== Biography ==
Islam Rzayev was born on 11 November 1934 in Sardarli, Fuzuli District. He was one of the followers of Karabakh singing school. He studied professional music education at Azerbaijan State Music College named after Asaf Zeynally in Baku (1951–1956) and studied mugham dastgahs in the class of Seyid Shushinski. He also took mugham lessons from Zulfu Adigozalov and Hagigat Rzayeva and improved his education. Then he graduated from Azerbaijan State Institute of Art in 1976.

From 1958 to the end of his life, he worked as a soloist of the Azerbaijan State Philharmonic Hall. He was also engaged in pedagogical work. The first State Mugham Theater was founded in 1989 in Baku on the initiative of Islam Rzayev. He served as artistic director of the Mugham Theater until his death.

The mugham dastgahs "Chahargah", "Bayaty-Kurd", "Mahur-Hindi" and "Rast" sang by him are included in the fund of AzTV. He also composed a number of songs, including "Gəl inad etmə", "Dağlar başı" and "Almadərən". He also applied to compositor works, sang solo part in the cantatas of Jahangir Jahangirov "Nasimi" and "Ashig Ali".

He has participated in more than 70 tours, representing Azerbaijani culture in France, England, Iran, Iraq, Algeria, Turkey, Israel, Colombia, Peru, Cuba, Japan, India, Nepal.

Khananda died on 26 January 2008 in Baku.

== Awards ==
- Honored Artist of the Azerbaijan SSR — 1967
- People's Artist of the Azerbaijan SSR — 1989
- Presidential Pension – 11 June 2002
- Shohrat Order – 10 November 2004
