= Hüngütlü =

- Location within Azerbaijan Location within Karabakh Economic Region
- Coordinates: 39°27′49.9″N 47°13′09.1″E
- Country: Azerbaijan
- District: Fuzuli
- Time zone: UTC+4 (AZT)
  - Summer (DST): UTC+5 (AZT)

Hüngütlü (Hungutlu) is a village in the Fuzuli District of Azerbaijan.
