= Qayıdış 1 Settlement =

Coordinates: 39°37′04″N 47°39′01″E

Qayıdış 1 Settlement is a settlement within the administrative territory of the Fuzuli District in Azerbaijan.

== History ==
By the decision of the National Assembly of the Republic of Azerbaijan No. 727-IIQ dated September 1, 2004, the newly established Qayıdış 1 Settlement in the Haramı area within the administrative unit of Fuzuli District was included in the list of territorial units of the district. The First Haramı settlement administrative territory unit was created, consisting of Qayıdış 1, Qayıdış 2, Qayıdış 3, Qayıdış 4, and Qayıdış 5 settlements, with Qayıdış 1 Settlement as its center. By the decision of the National Assembly of the Republic of Azerbaijan No. 837-IIIQ dated June 19, 2009, the First Haramı settlement administrative territory unit of Fuzuli District was renamed Qayıdış 1 Settlement administrative territory unit.

== Population ==
The settlement is inhabited by internally displaced persons who left their homes during the First Nagorno-Karabakh War.

== Postal service ==
The Dövlətyarlı Post Office is located in Qayıdış 1 Settlement. Postal code: AZ1919.

== Education ==
A school building with a capacity of 135 students has been constructed and put into operation in Qayıdış 1 Settlement.

The "Qayıdış 1 Full Secondary School" operates in the settlement.
