= Şəkərcik =

- Location within Azerbaijan Location within Karabakh Economic Region
- Coordinates: 39°36′16″N 47°10′00″E
- Country: Azerbaijan
- District: Fuzuli
- Time zone: UTC+4 (AZT)

Şəkərcik (Shakarjik) is a village in the Fuzuli District of Azerbaijan.
