= Merdinli =

- Location within Azerbaijan Location within Karabakh Economic Region
- Coordinates: 39°36′N 47°15′E
- Country: Azerbaijan
- District: Fuzuli
- Time zone: UTC+4 (AZT)

Merdinli is a village in the Fuzuli District of Azerbaijan. During the period between the end of the First Nagorno-Karabakh war and the end of the 2020 Nagorno-Karabakh war the village was controlled by the unrecognized Republic of Artsakh as a part of its Hadrut Province.
