= Araz Dilağarda =

- Municipality
- Location within Azerbaijan Location within Karabakh Economic Region
- Coordinates: 39°34′N 47°35′E
- Country: Azerbaijan
- District: Fuzuli
- Elevation: 87 m (285 ft)

Population
  - Total: 2,851
- Time zone: UTC+4 (AZT)

Araz Dilağarda (also, Araz Dilagarda, Delagardy, and Dilagarda) is a village and municipality in the Fuzuli District of Azerbaijan. It has a population of 2,851.
