= Dördçinar =

- Location within Azerbaijan Location within Karabakh Economic Region
- Coordinates: 39°27′39″N 47°12′51″E
- Country: Azerbaijan
- District: Fuzuli
- Time zone: UTC+4 (AZT)

Dördçinar (Dordchinar) is a village in Fuzuli District of Azerbaijan. The village was occupied by Armenian forces during the First Nagorno-Karabakh War. On 20 October 2020, Azerbaijani president Ilham Aliyev stated that the village had been recaptured by Azerbaijani forces.
