= Kürdlər, Fuzuli =

Kürdlər
- Location within Azerbaijan Location within Karabakh Economic Region
- Coordinates: 39°32′29″N 47°12′04″E
- Country: Azerbaijan
- District: Fuzuli
- Time zone: UTC+4 (AZT)

Kürdlər (also Kyurdlyar and Kyurtlar) is a village in Fuzuli District of Azerbaijan. On 20 October 2020 President of Azerbaijan Ilham Aliyev claimed the village had been captured from the Republic of Artsakh by Azerbaijani forces, though this has not yet been corroborated by third-party sources.
