= Fəridə Vəzirova =

Azerbaijani WWII veteran and philologist

- Born: 15 February 1924; Garyagin District
- Died: 1986 (aged 61–62); Baku
- Education: Azerbaijan State University
- Occupation: Professor
- Known for: War hero and professor
- Children: yes

Fəridə Vəzirova (15 February 1924 – 1986) was a World War II veteran and professor of philology in Azerbaijan.

== Life ==
Vəzirova was born in 1924 at Sardarli village in the Garyagin district. She entered the Philology Faculty of the Azerbaijan State University in 1940. She volunteered in 1942 at the invitation of the All-Union Leninist Young Communist League (Komsomol). She served as an ordinary soldier working with communications and she received several medals.

Vəzirova graduated with honours after leaving the army in October 1945 funded by Stalin's scholarship. In 1948, she began working as a writer for The Teacher, a literary worker newspaper.

She led the critics section of the magazine Azerbaijan. In 1952–53, she was a senior lecturer. In 1972, she published Mamed Said Ordubadi. In 1980, she became a Professor of the History of Azerbaijani Literature.

She was awarded eight medals for her work in the front line of both labor and war.

Vəzirova died in Baku in 1986. In 2014, a ceremony took place on the 90th anniversary of her birth involving university professors, politicians and her daughter at the Writers Union of Azerbaijan.

== See also ==
- Khatira Bashirli
- Sima Eyvazova

== Bibliography ==
- Vezirova, Farida. Literary notes, studies. - Baku: Pagans, 1985. p. 187
