= Khatira Bashirli =

Azerbaijani scientist

Khatira Badraddin qizi Bashirli
- Born: January 5, 1958
- Education: Azerbaijani State University
- Awards: Honorary Diploma of the Presidium of ANAS (1.XII.2010)
- Scientific career
- Workplaces: Azerbaijan National Academy of Sciences National Museum of Azerbaijani literature named after Nizami Ganjavi

Khatira Badraddin qizi Bashirli (Azerbaijani: Xatirə Bədrəddin qızı Bəşirli; 5 January 1958) is a doctor of philology, professor, assistant director of science of the National Museum of Azerbaijani Literature named after Nizami Ganjavi of the Azerbaijan National Academy of Sciences, chairman of the first regional organization “The museologist” of New Azerbaijan Party (NAP) of Sabail region.

== Background ==
Khatira Bashirli was born in January 1958 in Agdash and she graduated from Azerbaijan State University (now BSU). She is now the assistant director of science of the National Museum of Azerbaijani Literature, named after Nizami Ganjavi of Azerbaijan National Academy of the Sciences. Since 2005, she has been the chair of the first regional organization “The museologist” of NAP of Sabail region. She taught the discipline “Azerbaijani language and literature” in Azerbaijan State University of Languages and the discipline “Azerbaijani language and literature” in Khazar University.

== Scientific-theoretical activity ==
Got the theoretical results from the point of research of the mutual connection of Azerbaijani prose and folklore, the form of the expression of folklorism in prose, the place of the genre of folklore in the organization of the written text and the history of the epos of the Turkic peoples, the likeness of the heroic eposes from the genetic point of view, the root unity, the architectonics of dastan.

Defended PhD thesis on the topic "Poetics (genesis and artistic system) of the epos "Keroglu"", DPhil thesis on the topic "Azerbaijani prose and folklore at the beginning of the 20th century".

She is the author of over 100 scientific and methodical works, 6 studies, 10 scientific articles published abroad.

== Scientific works ==
1. Azerbaijani prose and folklore of the beginning of the 20th century. Baky, “Elm”, 1990
2. The roots, sources, memory. Baky, Encyclopaedia of Azerbaijan, 1996
3. The dastan “Keroglu”. The historical-mythological truth and poetics. Baky, “Elm”, 2000
4. The poetics of the epos “Keroglu”. The genesis and poetical system. Baky, “Elm”, 2005
5. The genesis of the dastan “Keroglu”. Baky, “Elm ve tehsil”, 2012
6. Folklore and written literature of Azerbaijan. Baky, “Elm ve tehsil”, 2013
7. Some textbooks and programmes for the universities, over 100 scientific and scientific-journalistic articles.

== See also ==
- Sima Eyvazova
- Fəridə Vəzirova
