= Shur (mugham) =

External videos
- Performance of Shur
- In performance of Bahram Mansurov (solo on tar, record of 1960)

“Shur”(Azerbaijani: Şur) – is one of the great mughams (a multifrequency vocal-instrumental composition) and one of seven main modes in Azerbaijani music.

This is the second mode and consists of 1-0.5-1 tone, which is created in the result of amalgamation of three tetra-chords with reach method of the first tetra-chord. Shur mode is the most used mode in Ashik art. Shur creates a joyful lyrical mood for the listener. Subgenres of Shur include: Bardasht, Maye, Salmak, Shur-Shahnaz, Busalik, Bayaty-Turk, Shikasteyi-Fars, Mubarriga, Ashiran, Semai-Shams, Hijaz, Shakh Khatai, Sarenj, Gemengiz, Nishibi-Feraz, space for Shur. Mugams relating to the Shur are: Shahnaz, Sarenj, Arazbary, Osmani, Rahab, Neva.

In comparison with Shur of the beginning of the 20th century, in the modern Shur many parts are not used. Modern Shur consists of parts (shobe) such as Maye, Kur-Shahnaz, Bayati-Kurd, Shikesteyi-fars, Mubarriga, Semayi-shems, Hijnaz, Sarenj and Nishibi-feraz. Some performers of Shur use little parts such as Buselik, Ashiran and Shah Khatai.

Maximally shortened kind of Shur destgah includes 8 main parts: Berdasht, Maye, Shur-Shahnaz, Bayati-Turk, Shikesteyi-fars, Semayi-shems, Hijaz and Sarenj. These parts play a function of "bearing components" of the whole construction in the modern level and make a mode "skeleton" of the composition.

There is also maqam Shur in Azerbaijani music. Mughams such as Shahnaz, Bayati-Kurd, Nava, Azerbaijani national songs and dance melodies and also Shur are based in this maqam.

Azerbaijani composer Fikret Amirov composed “Shur” mugham on the basis of this Shur. A documentary of the same name, shot in 1967 by AzTV, is dedicated to “Shur” mugham.
