= Yuxarı Seyidəhmədli =

- Location within Azerbaijan Location within Karabakh Economic Region
- Coordinates: 39°34′40″N 47°15′39″E
- Country: Azerbaijan
- District: Fuzuli
- Time zone: UTC+4 (AZT)

Yuxarı Seyidəhmədli (Yukhary Seyidahmadli) is a village in the Fuzuli District of Azerbaijan. It was under the occupation of Armenian forces of the self-proclaimed Republic of Artsakh since the First Nagorno-Karabakh war until its recapture by the Azerbaijan Army on or around November 7, 2020.
