= Aşağı Veysəlli =

- Location within Azerbaijan
- Coordinates: 39°42′22″N 47°13′55″E
- Country: Azerbaijan
- District: Fuzuli
- Time zone: UTC+4 (AZT)

Aşağı Veysəlli (Ashaghy Veysalli) is a village in Fuzuli District of Azerbaijan. The village was occupied by Armenian forces during the First Nagorno-Karabakh War until 20 October 2020 when President of Azerbaijan Ilham Aliyev announced it had been taken by Azerbaijani forces.
