= Qobu Dilağarda =

- Location within Azerbaijan Location within Karabakh Economic Region
- Coordinates: 39°40′35″N 47°10′23″E
- Country: Azerbaijan
- District: Fuzuli
- Time zone: UTC+4 (AZT)

Qobu Dilağarda (also, Kobu-Dilagarda) is a village in the Fuzuli District of Azerbaijan.

== Notable natives ==
- Pahlivan Farzaliyev — National Hero of Azerbaijan.
