= Birinci Zobucuq =

- Municipality
- Location within Azerbaijan Location within Karabakh Economic Region
- Coordinates: 39°32′53″N 47°23′26″E
- Country: Azerbaijan
- District: Fuzuli
- Time zone: UTC+4 (AZT)

Birinci Zobucuq is an urban-type settlement in the Fuzuli District of Azerbaijan. It consists of IDPs who left their homes during the First Nagorno-Karabakh War who were settled in the area.

== History ==
On 13 June 2008, by the Resolution of the Milli Mejlis of the Republic of Azerbaijan No. 643-IIIQ, the newly established settlement in the Fuzuli District was named Birinci Zobucuq settlement and entered into the State register of territorial units of the Republic of Azerbaijan. Birinci Zobucuq was established as the administrative territorial circle of Birinci Zobucuq settlement.
