= Aşağı Kürdmahmudlu =

- Municipality
- Location within Azerbaijan Location within Karabakh Economic Region
- Coordinates: 39°35′22″N 47°28′32″E
- Country: Azerbaijan
- District: Fuzuli

Population (2009)
  - Total: 1,191
- Time zone: UTC+4 (AZT)

Aşağı Kürdmahmudlu (also, Aşağı Kürmahmudlu and Ashagy Kyurdmakhmudlu) is a village and municipality in the Fuzuli District of Azerbaijan.
