= Yuxarı Kürdmahmudlu =

- Municipality
- Location within Azerbaijan Location within Karabakh Economic Region
- Coordinates: 39°35′57″N 47°26′57″E
- Country: Azerbaijan
- District: Fuzuli

Population
  - Total: 1,269
- Time zone: UTC+4 (AZT)

Yuxarı Kürdmahmudlu (Yukhary Kurdmahmudlu) is a village and municipality in the Fuzuli District of Azerbaijan. It has a population of 1,269.
