= Sərdarlı =

- Location within Azerbaijan Location within Karabakh Economic Region
- Coordinates: 39°32′N 47°09′E
- Country: Azerbaijan
- District: Fuzuli
- Time zone: UTC+4 (AZT)

Sərdarlı (also Sardarly) is a village in the Fuzuli District of Azerbaijan.

== People ==
- Fəridə Vəzirova, war hero and professor, was born here in 1924.
