= Kondalanchay =

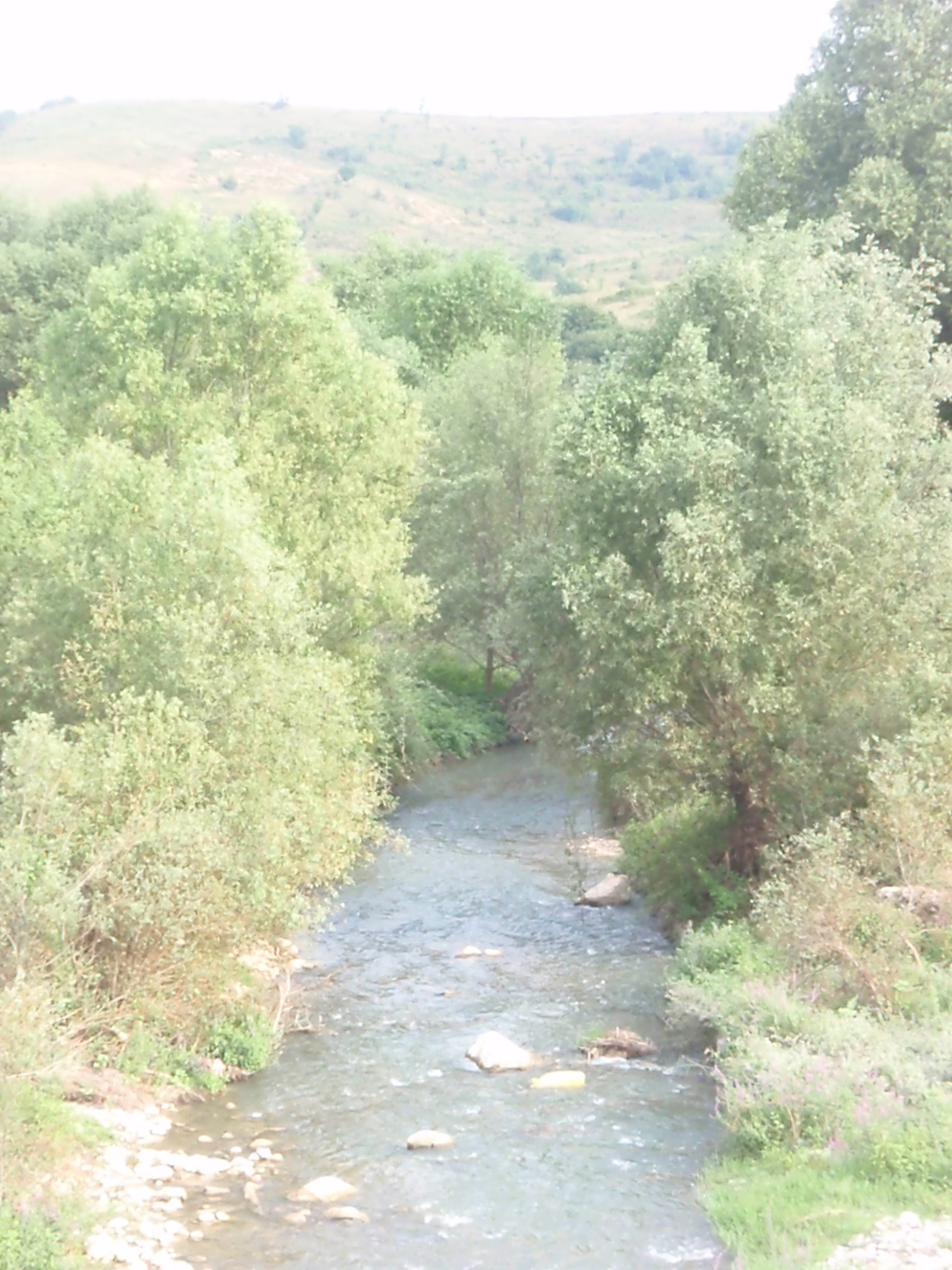
- Native name: Köndələnçay (Azerbaijani)

Location
- Country: Azerbaijan

Physical characteristics
- Source: Lesser Caucasus
- Mouth: Aras
  - coordinates: 39°32′23″N 47°36′37″E
- Length: 88 km (55 mi)

Basin features
- Progression: Aras → Kura → Caspian Sea

Kondalanchay (Azerbaijani: Köndələnçay) is a river in Azerbaijan, a left tributary of Araz. It flows through the territory of Khojaly, Khojavend and Fuzuli districts. Archaeological sites of the Bronze Age and the ancient period have been found along the river.

== Description ==
The length of the river is 89 km, the basin area is 594 km². The source of Kondalanchay is located on the Karabakh ridge, at an altitude of about 1780 m. The annual river flow is 50 million m³. The river is mainly fed by rain and groundwater. Reservoirs have been built on the river, the water of the river is used for irrigation, because of which the water reaches the mouth only during periods of flood.
