= Horadiz =

- Municipality
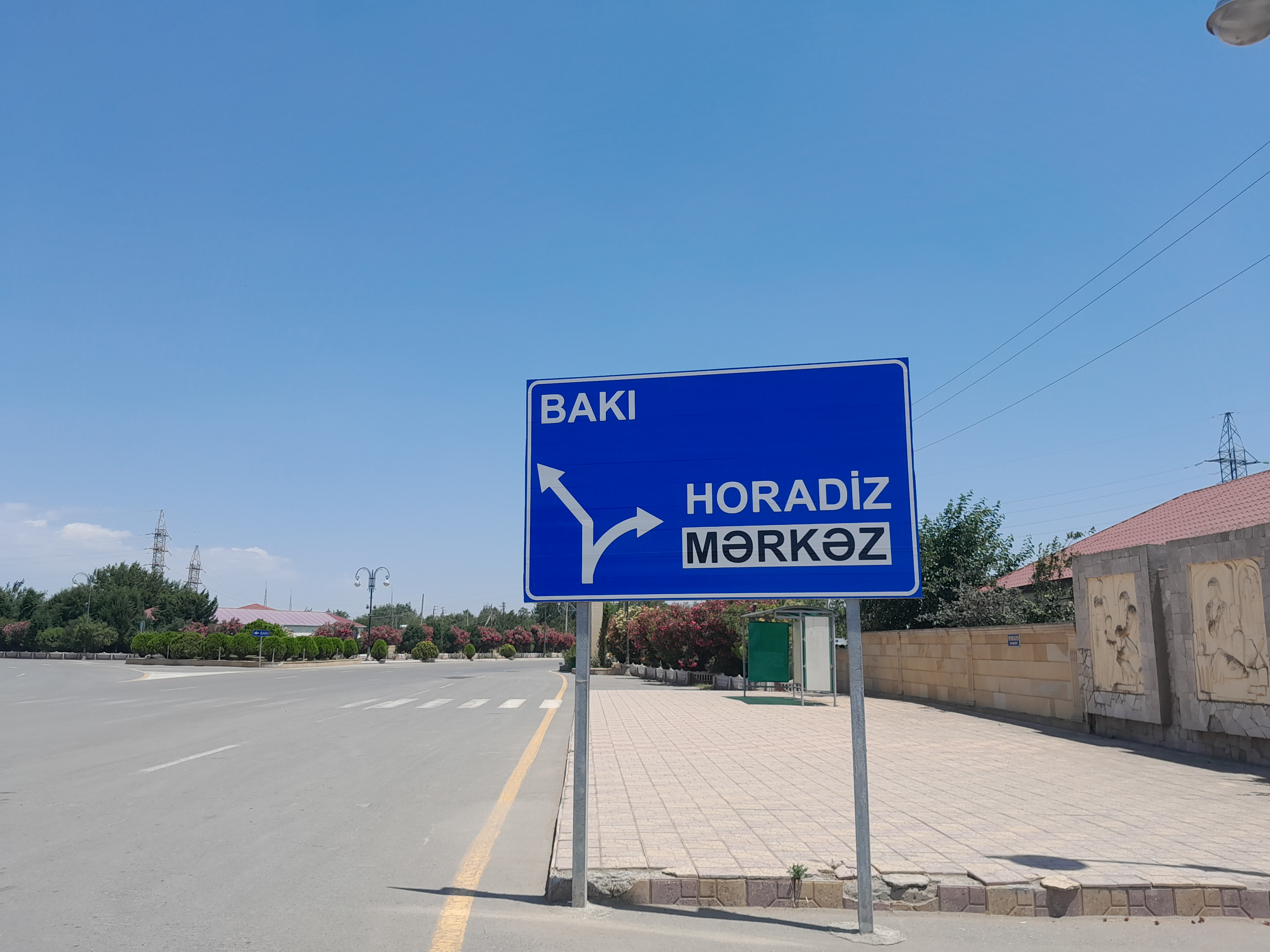
- Horadiz city direction sign

- Location within Azerbaijan Location within Karabakh Economic Region
- Coordinates: 39°26′52″N 47°20′11″E
- Country: Azerbaijan
- District: Fuzuli

Population
  - Total: 7,600
- Time zone: UTC+4 (AZT)

Horadiz is a city and municipality in the Fuzuli District of Azerbaijan, located on the left bank of the Aras river. As of 2019, it had a population of 7,600 people.

== History ==
During the Russian Empire, the village of Horadiz was part of the Jebrail Uyezd of Elisabethpol Governorate. According to the "Caucasian calendar" of 1912, the village had 1,424 inhabitants, the majority of whom were Azerbaijani Turks, who were listed as "Tatars" in the calendar.

Horadiz was designated as an urban-type settlement on 24 September 1947. It had a population of 5,689 people according to the 1989 Soviet census.

During the First Nagorno-Karabakh War, the village was the scene of fierce fighting. On 24 October 1993, the village was captured by Armenian forces, which was condemned by UN Security Council Resolution No. 884 of 12 November 1993 and labelled as an occupation. On 6 January 1994, the Azerbaijani army regained control of the village in a counter-offensive. On 23 October 2007, Horadiz was granted city status.

== Economy and culture ==
In the post-war period, Horadiz became the unofficial centre of the Fuzuli District, and large projects were implemented in the area of social infrastructure - 24 schools, 2 hospitals, Olympic Sports Complex, youth centre, historical and ethnographic museum, and mugham centre were built, individual houses restored.

Since the fall of the city of Fuzuli under Armenian control in 1993, Horadiz has housed a number of cultural establishments previously based in Fuzuli, namely the Fuzuli State Drama Theatre, the Fuzuli Museum of Local History and the Fuzuli State Art Gallery.

== Gallery ==
Fuzuli District administrative headquarters

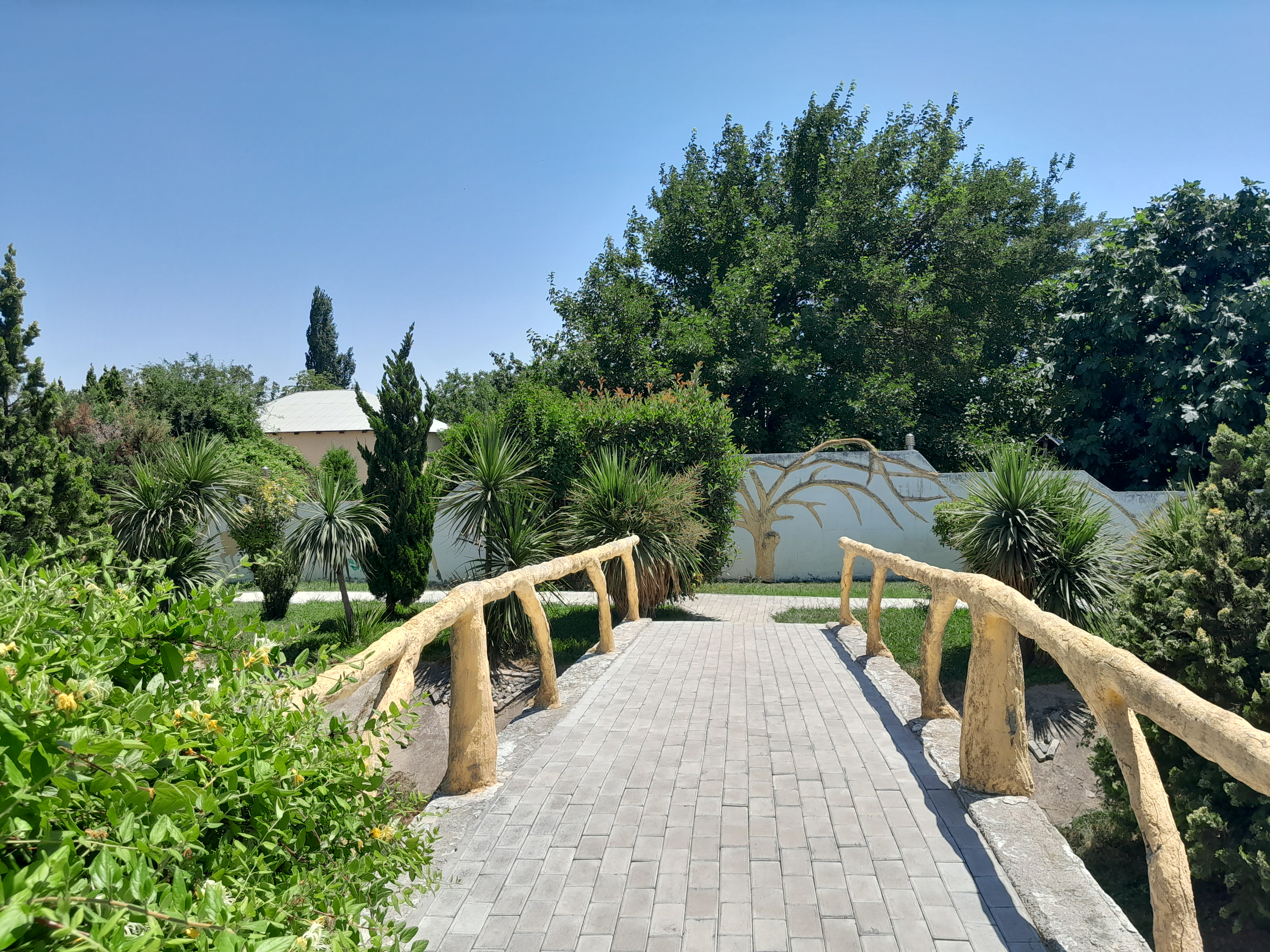
Park in Horadiz

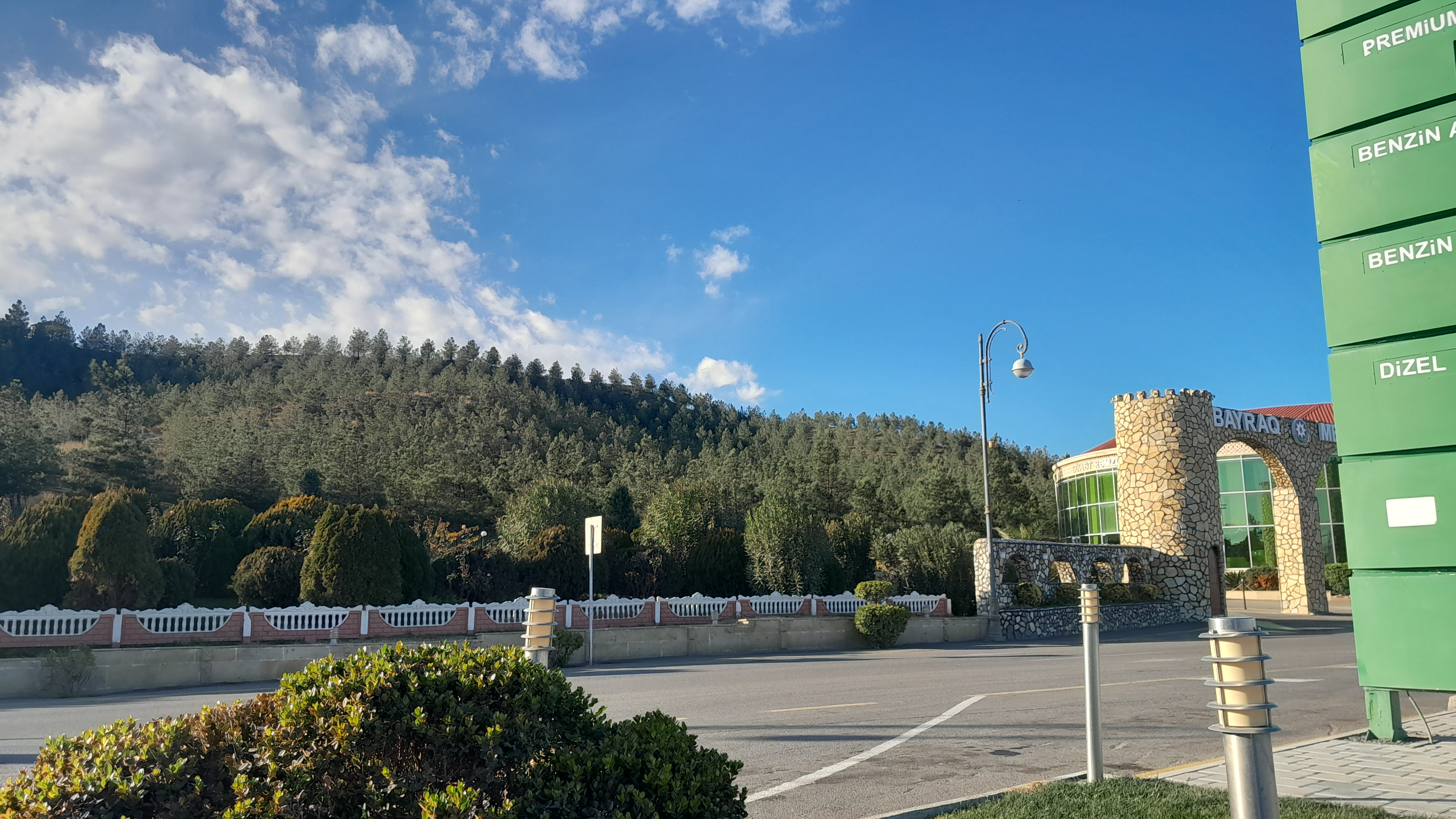
Horadiz city flag square
