= Sima Eyvazova =

Azerbaijani diplomat (1933–2009)

- Sima Rəhman qızı Eyvazova
- Born: 2 October 1933; Baku, Transcaucasian SFSR, Soviet Union
- Died: 6 May 2009 (aged 75); Geneva, Switzerland
- Education: Baku State University

Sima Eyvazova (Azerbaijani: Sima Rəhman qızı Eyvazova; 2 October 1933 – 6 May 2009) was an Azerbaijani diplomat, the first representative of the independent Republic at the United Nations Office in Geneva between 1994 and 1999.

== Biography ==
She was born in Baku and studied philology at the Baku State University. Her father was a doctor.

She began to work at the age of 16 and at 23 worked in the Department of Agitation and Propaganda of the Central Committee of the Communist Party of Azerbaijan during the Second Secretaryship of Vladimir Semichastny. At the age of 26, by decision of the Central Committee, she was sent to study at the Diplomatic Higher School in the Ministry of Foreign Affairs of the USSR, which she graduated with honors.

== Diplomat career ==
She worked in the central office of the Ministry of Foreign Affairs of the USSR in the 2nd European Division, which dealt with the relations of the Soviet Union to the United Kingdom, and in the external offices of the Ministry of Foreign Affairs - at the Soviet embassy in London and Sofia, as well as in the United Nations system at the UN Headquarters in New York, and UN offices in Geneva and Vienna.

In 1982, the 1st Secretary of the Central Committee of the Communist Party of Azerbaijan, Heydar Aliyev, invited her to serve as Minister of Foreign Affairs of the Azerbaijani SSR.

From 1985 to 1993, she worked in a responsible position at the United Nations Office in Geneva.

From January 1994, she served as the permanent representative of Azerbaijan in the United Nations office in Geneva and other international organizations in Switzerland.

By decree of the President of the Republic of Azerbaijan, Heydar Aliyev, of March 4, 1997, was appointed to the UN Office in Geneva and other international organizations in Switzerland with the rank of Extraordinary and Plenipotentiary Ambassador.

She maintained friendly relations with other well-known diplomats from Azerbaijan, like Tahira Tahirova and Elmira Gafarova.

Sima Eyvazova became the first professional diplomat of the recent Republic of Azerbaijan, also the only non-Russian women of the former USSR who graduated from the Superior Diplomatic School of the Soviet Ministry of Foreign Affairs. In October 1991, while working at the UN office in Geneve, she resigned from the Soviet diplomatic service and registered as a citizen of an independent Republic of Azerbaijan, becoming the first employee in the history of the UN who had the Azerbaijani citizenship.

== See also ==
- Khatira Bashirli
- Fəridə Vəzirova
