= Dövlətyarlı =

- Location within Azerbaijan Location within Karabakh Economic Region
- Coordinates: 39°37′07″N 47°09′05″E
- Country: Azerbaijan
- District: Fuzuli
- Time zone: UTC+4 (AZT)

Dövlətyarlı (also, Dövlətkarlı, Dovlyatkyarly, and Dovlyatyarly) is a village in the Fuzuli District of Azerbaijan.
