= Mollavəli =

- Location within Azerbaijan Location within Karabakh Economic Region
- Coordinates: 39°30′50″N 47°07′42″E
- Country: Azerbaijan
- District: Fuzuli
- Time zone: UTC+4 (AZT)

Mollavəli (also, Mollaveli) is a village in Fuzuli District, Azerbaijan.
