= Dilağarda, Fuzuli =

Dilağarda
- Location within Azerbaijan Location within Karabakh Economic Region
- Coordinates: 39°42′41″N 47°09′38″E
- Country: Azerbaijan
- District: Fuzuli
- Time zone: UTC+4 (AZT)

Dilağarda (also, Dilagorda and Dulagarda) is a village in the Fuzuli District of Azerbaijan.
