= Yuxarı Rəfədinli =

- Location within Azerbaijan Location within Karabakh Economic Region
- Coordinates: 39°28′53″N 47°07′19″E
- Country: Azerbaijan
- District: Fuzuli
- Time zone: UTC+4 (AZT)

Yuxarı Rəfədinli (Yukhary Rafadinli) is a village in Fuzuli District, Azerbaijan.
