= Yuxarı Yağlıvənd =

Yağlıvənd
- Location within Azerbaijan Location within Karabakh Economic Region
- Coordinates: 39°38′42″N 47°07′07″E
- Country: Azerbaijan
- District: Fuzuli
- Time zone: UTC+4 (AZT)

Yağlıvənd (Yaghlyvend) is a village in the Fuzuli District of Azerbaijan.
