= Gecəgözlü =

- Location within Azerbaijan Location within Karabakh Economic Region
- Coordinates: 39°34′34″N 47°11′50″E
- Country: Azerbaijan
- District: Fuzuli
- Time zone: UTC+4 (AZT)

Gecəgözlü (also Gedzhagëzlyu and Gedzhagozlu) is a village in Fuzuli District of Azerbaijan.
