= Dilağarda, Beylagan =

Dilağarda
- Location within Azerbaijan
- Coordinates: 39°45′48″N 47°37′36″E
- Country: Azerbaijan
- Rayon: Beylagan
- Time zone: UTC+4 (AZT)
  - Summer (DST): UTC+5 (AZT)

Dilağarda is a village in the Beylagan Rayon of Azerbaijan.
