= Araz Zərgar =

- Municipality
- Location within Azerbaijan Location within Karabakh Economic Region
- Coordinates: 39°34′07″N 47°37′18″E
- Country: Azerbaijan
- District: Fuzuli
- Elevation: 84 m (276 ft)

Population
  - Total: 3,261
- Time zone: UTC+4 (AZT)

Araz Zərgar (also, Araz Zərgər, Araz Zərkar, Araz Zargyar, and Zargyar Vtoroye) is a village and municipality in the Fuzuli District of Azerbaijan. It has a population of 3,261.
