= Aşağı Əbdürrəhmanlı =

- Location within Azerbaijan Location within Karabakh Economic Region
- Coordinates: 39°31′33″N 47°15′57″E
- Country: Azerbaijan
- District: Fuzuli
- Elevation: 267 m (876 ft)

Population
  - Total: 0
- Time zone: UTC+4 (AZT)

Aşağı Əbdürrəhmanlı (also, Ashaga-Abdurakhmanly and Ashagy Abdurakhmanly) is a village in the Fuzuli District of Azerbaijan. It is currently uninhabited.

It was controlled by the Armenian Army from 1993 (following the First Nagorno-Karabakh War) until 2020.

On October 3, 2020, the Azerbaijani Ministry of Defence announced that the Azerbaijani Army had taken control of the village.
