= Çərəli =

- Location within Azerbaijan
- Coordinates: 39°15′06″N 46°37′00″E
- Country: Azerbaijan
- Rayon: Qubadli
- Time zone: UTC+4 (AZT)

Charali (Azerbaijani: Çərəli) is a village situated in the eponymous administrative-territorial county of Gubadly district of Azerbaijan.

== History ==
According to the "Collection of statistical data on the population of the Transcaucasian region extracted from the family lists of 1886", in the village of Charali, part of Safulin rural district of Zangezur district, Elizavetpol province, there were 29 households, and 181 Tatars Sunni Muslim faith (later known as Azerbaijanis), all of whom were state peasants.
