= Aghabala Aghasaid oghlu =

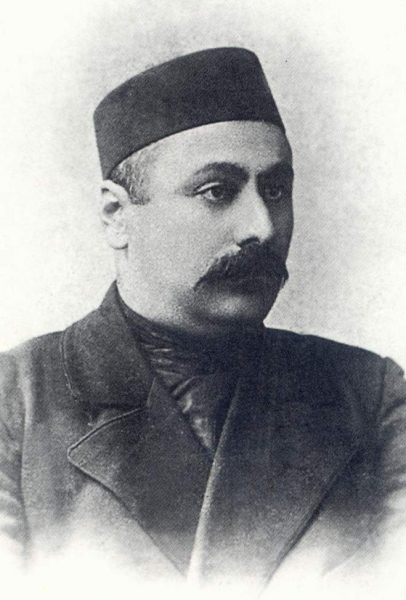

Background information
- Born: Ağabala Ağasəid oğlu 1860
- Died: 1928 (aged 67–68) Baku, Azerbaijan SSR
- Genres: mugham, Azerbaijani folk music
- Occupations: singer, songwriter

Aghabala Aghasaid oghlu (Azerbaijani: Ağabala Ağasəid oğlu; 1860–1928) was an Azerbaijani singer of folk music and mugam.

== Life ==
Agabala Aghasaid oghlu was born in 1860. From an early age, he was fond of poetry, music, learned the Persian language and got acquainted with poetry of Middle East. He participated in "Majmuish-shura" of mugham gatherings held in Baku in the 1880s, which had a strong impact on his career. He was mainly involved in mugham gatherings.

== Career ==
Aghabala Agasaid oghlu was a khananda, who had a particular interest in poetry and literature. His performances of "Bayati-Shiraz", "Rast", "Shur" and "Segah-zabul" are distinguished for their sensitiveness. He performed together with famous tar players, including Shirin Akhundov, Mirza Mansur Mansurov, Ahmad Bakikhanov, Mirza Faraj Rzayev.
