= Aşağı Seyidəhmədli =

- Location within Azerbaijan Location within Karabakh Economic Region
- Coordinates: 39°34′23″N 47°18′22″E
- Country: Azerbaijan
- District: Fuzuli
- Time zone: UTC+4 (AZT)

Aşağı Seyidəhmədli (also Ashaga Seyd-Akhmedly and Ashagy Seidakhmedli) is a village in Fuzuli District of Azerbaijan.
