= Aşağı Yağləvənd =

- Municipality
- Location within Azerbaijan Location within Karabakh Economic Region
- Coordinates: 39°30′32″N 47°27′40″E
- Country: Azerbaijan
- District: Fuzuli

Population
  - Total: 2,191
- Time zone: UTC+4 (AZT)

Aşağı Yağləvənd (also, Aşağı Yağlıvənd, Ashagy Yaglevend and Yaglavend) is a village and municipality in the Fuzuli District of Azerbaijan. It has a population of 2,191.
