= Yuxarı Aybasanlı =

- Location within Azerbaijan Location within Karabakh Economic Region
- Coordinates: 39°35′36″N 47°10′17″E
- Country: Azerbaijan
- District: Fuzuli
- Time zone: UTC+4 (AZT)

Yuxarı Aybasanlı (Yukhary Aybasanly) is a village in Fuzuli District of Azerbaijan. The village was occupied by Armenian forces in the First Nagorno-Karabakh war and was retaken by Azerbaijan Army on 20 October 2020.
