= Aşağı Rəfədinli =

- Location within Azerbaijan Location within Karabakh Economic Region
- Coordinates: 39°28′48″N 47°08′06″E
- Country: Azerbaijan
- District: Fuzuli
- Time zone: UTC+4 (AZT)

Aşağı Rəfədinli (also, Ashaga Rafadely and Ashagy Rafadinli) is a village in Fuzuli District of Azerbaijan.
