= Tunku Abdul Rahman Foundation =

Malaysian foundation

- Named after: Tunku Abdul Rahman
- Established: 1966
- Type: Statutory body
- Legal status: Foundation
- Purpose: Higher education access, Student financial aid, Youth empowerment and leadership
- Location: Kuala Lumpur, Malaysia
- Region served: Malaysia
- Method: Scholarships, grants, development programmes and awards
- Chairperson: Datin Sri Sharifah Menyalara Syed Hussein
- CEO: Kularetnam Vijayakumar
- Affiliations: Ministry of National Unity (Malaysia)
- Revenue: Endownment fund, in-kind and cash donation
- Employees: 15-20
- Website: yayasantar.org.my

Tunku Abdul Rahman Foundation (Malay: Yayasan Tunku Abdul Rahman) is a statutory body incorporated by an Act of Parliament in 1966. The primary aim of the foundation is to recognise and encourage the development of Malaysian youths through higher education access, mentoring, scholarship, and development programmes.

== History ==
On the occasion of the 62nd birthday of the first Prime Minister of Malaysia, Tunku Abdul Rahman, on 8 February 1965, the Malay language newspaper, Utusan Melayu, launched a fund-raising exercise to set up a proposed education fund to provide for the higher education of Malay youths. Initially named the Tunku Abdul Rahman Education Fund (Malay: Tabung Pendidikan Tunku Abdul Rahman), it gained the support of a broad segment of Malaysian society.

As a result, the federal government of Malaysia decided to formally establish a national foundation and open the fund to Malaysian applicants regardless of their ethnicity or creed. This was made possible with the passage of Act 389: Tunku Abdul Rahman Foundation Fund Act 1966 (Malay: Akta Kumpulan Wang Yayasan Tunku Abdul Rahman 1966) in Parliament on 20 June, and later at Senate on 28 June 1966. The Act received royal assent on 16 July 1966, and was officially gazetted on 28 July the same year.

Mohd Khir Johari was appointed as the first chairman of the board of trustees upon the establishment of the foundation. On 16 April 1974, the cabinet decided that the seat of the chairman would be held by the office of the Minister of Education. On 26 March 2004 the jurisdiction of the foundation was transferred from the Ministry of Education to the newly devolved Ministry of Higher Education. In December 2022, the jurisdiction of the foundation was once again transferred from the Ministry of Higher Education to the Ministry of National Unity.

== Programmes and awards ==
=== Tunku Abdul Rahman Foundation Scholarship ===
This scholarship (not to be mistaken with other Tunku Abdul Rahman scholarships) was established in 2006 to replace a previous financial aid program that was in the form of a loan. In 2019, this scholarship was revamped to include a two-year leadership programme component.

The Tunku Abdul Rahman Foundation Scholarship (Malay: Biasiswa Tunku Abdul Rahman or BTAR) is one of the foundation's flagship programmes. Applications for the scholarship are opened annually on 8 February, in conjunction with Tunku Abdul Rahman's birth date. The scholarship is open to prospective and current students of all Malaysian Qualifications Agency (MQA) accredited courses in both public and private universities within Malaysia. The scholarship does not impose a minimum age limit, or a minimum CGPA requirement for its candidates.

Recipients of this scholarship are known as Tunku Scholars. After several batches of scholarship recipients, Tunku Scholars Association Malaysia was established to foster bonds and build a network with current scholarship recipients and alumni.

=== Closing The Gap ===
This programme aims to empower high potential secondary school students from underserved backgrounds with the knowledge, skills and mindset to achieve their higher education aspirations. Closing The Gap (CTG) started as an independent initiative in September 2016, and was brought into YTAR in 2019.

The programme currently has two offshoots: CTG Scholar is a 2-year higher education access and mentoring programme for higher secondary school students based in Klang Valley, while Cikgu CTG is 6-month train-the-trainer programme for Guidance and Counselling Teachers (Malay: Guru Bimbingan dan Kaunseling) which adapts the original programme to be delivered in the teachers' respective schools and colleges.

=== FutureReady ===
FutureReady is an employability upskilling programme focused on equipping university students from under-represented communities with skills, knowledge and experience to thrive in the job market. This programme is open to Malaysian undergraduates who are currently pursuing, or have completed an undergraduate degree in Malaysian universities recognised by MQA.

=== Pingat Tunku Award (Malay: Anugerah Pingat Tunku) ===
This prize has been awarded since 1979 to outstanding Malaysian university graduates who uphold Tunku's ideals, values and legacy through academic excellence, leadership and a strong commitment towards Malaysian nation-building. The award was expanded to include three categories, including gold, silver and bronze in 2010. Beginning 2020, awardees now receive a grant prize to implement a community project of their choice on top of existing prize money.

Previously, awardees received a gold medal, a certificate, and a unit trust certificate from Amanah Saham Gemilang worth RM 3,000. Only one graduate from a local institution of higher education was selected annually, with nominations being received from their respective institutions and selected based on specific criteria set by the foundation.

== Governance ==
The foundation is governed by a board of trustees made up of the following:

- The Chairperson as appointed by the Yang Di-Pertuan Agong, on the advice of the Minister charged with the responsibility of the Fund
- One representative from the Ministry charged with the responsibility of the Fund
- One representative from the Federal Treasury of Malaysia
- Six members appointed by the Minister, after consultation with the Chairman

== See also ==
- Ministry of National Unity (Malaysia)
- Tunku Abdul Rahman
- Scholarship
- Philanthropy
- Social responsibility
