= Zərgər =

- Location within Azerbaijan Location within Karabakh Economic Region
- Coordinates: 39°36′57″N 47°06′36″E
- Country: Azerbaijan
- District: Fuzuli
- Time zone: UTC+4 (AZT)

Zərgər (Zargar) is a village in Fuzuli District of Azerbaijan.

== Etymology ==
The word Zərgər means goldsmith in Azerbaijani language.
