= Arazbary (mugham) =

Rhythmic Azerbaijani mugham

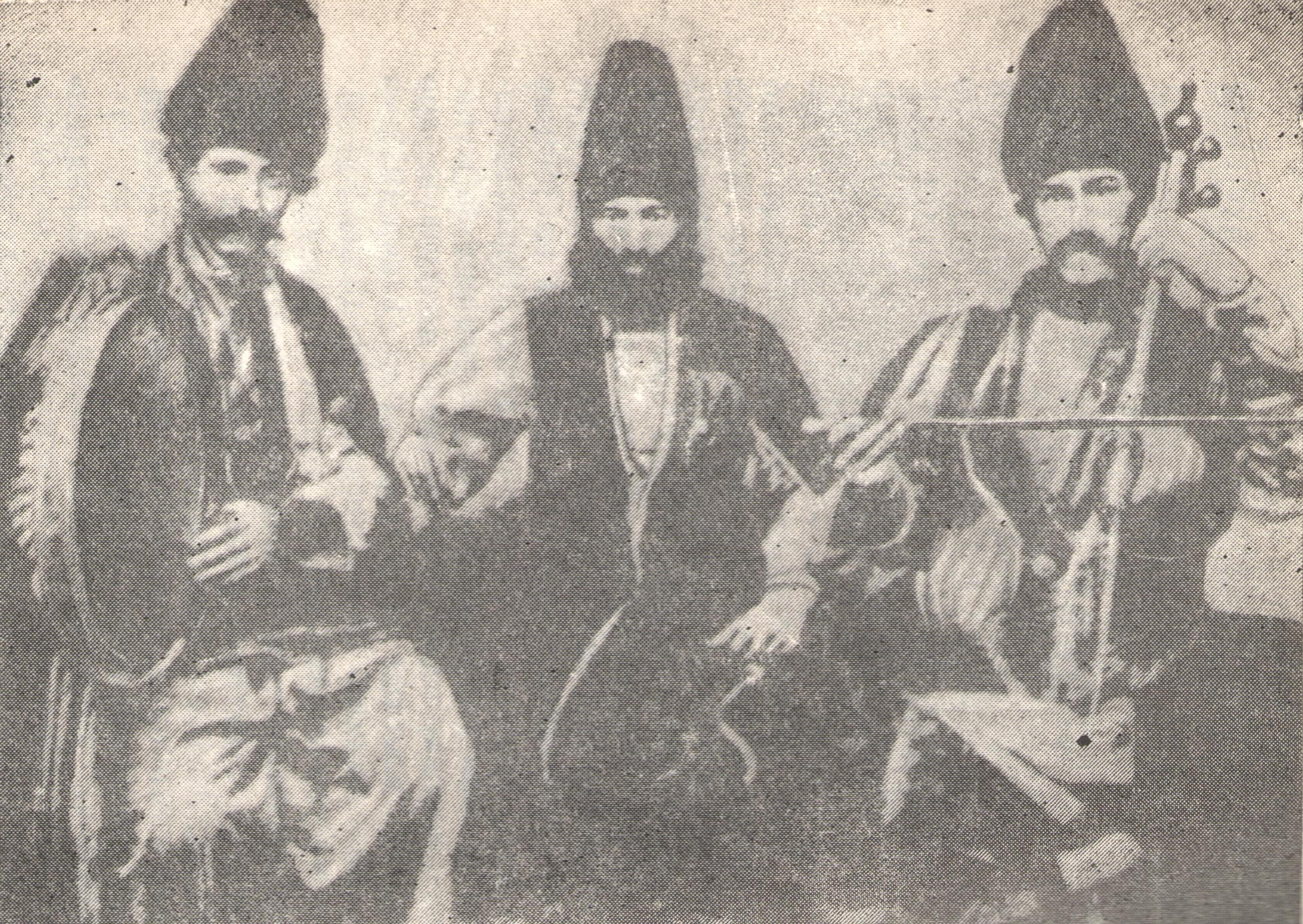
- Azerbaijani mugham singer Sattar and his ensemble
- Native name: Azerbaijani: Arazbarı
- Form: Azerbaijani Mugham
- Scoring: Daf, Tar and Kamancha

"Arazbary" (Azerbaijani: Arazbarı) is one of the rhythmic Azerbaijani mughams belonging to the Zerbi mughams. The poetic text consists of folk bayats. At the end of each stanza, the words "ay zalym" ("Oh, villain!") are repeated. Arazbary, like the ashik melodies, is included in then creative heritage of ashik masters.

Further, they were used, along with other elements of Azerbaijani folk music, in musical works of the classical European tradition. In particular, the composer Uzeyir Hajibeyov created a symphonic version of arazbary and used it (along with eirats, segah and other forms of mugham) in the first Azerbaijani opera "Leyli and Majnun", written in 1907 and based on the poem of the same name by the Azerbaijani poet Fuzuli.
