= Yuxarı Əbdürrəhmanlı =

- Location within Azerbaijan Location within Karabakh Economic Region
- Coordinates: 39°33′43″N 47°12′17″E
- Country: Azerbaijan
- District: Fuzuli

Population
  - Total: 0
- Time zone: UTC+4 (AZT)

Yuxarı Əbdürrəhmanlı (Yukhary Abdurrahmanly) is a village in Fuzuli District of Azerbaijan. It is currently uninhabited. The village had been occupied by Armenian forces in the First Nagorno-Karabakh war and was retaken by Azerbaijani forces on 20 October 2020.
