= Fuzuli District =

District in southwestern Azerbaijan

Coordinates: 39.6003°N 47.1431°E

- District
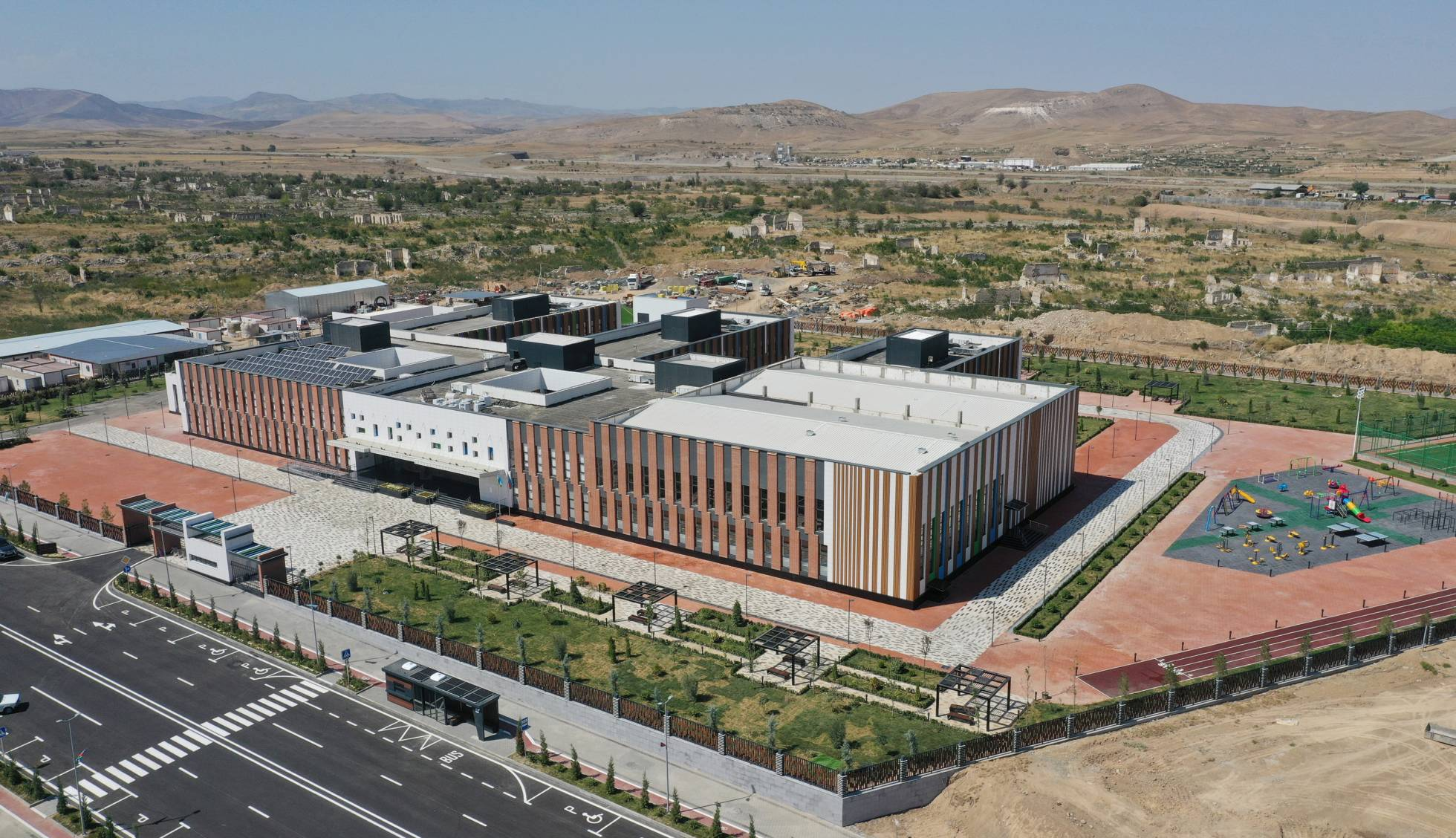
- Secondary school No. 1 named after Mirzo Ulugbek in Fuzuli

- Map of Azerbaijan showing Fuzuli District
- Country: Azerbaijan
- Region: Karabakh
- Established: 4 January 1963
- Capital: Fuzuli (nominal); Horadiz (de facto)
- Settlements: 77

Government
  - Governor: Ali Aliyev

Area
  - Total: 1,390 km^{2} (540 sq mi)

Population (2020)
  - Total: 133,800
  - Density: 96.3/km^{2} (249/sq mi)
- Time zone: UTC+4 (AZT)
- Postal code: 1900
- Website: fuzuli-ih.gov.az

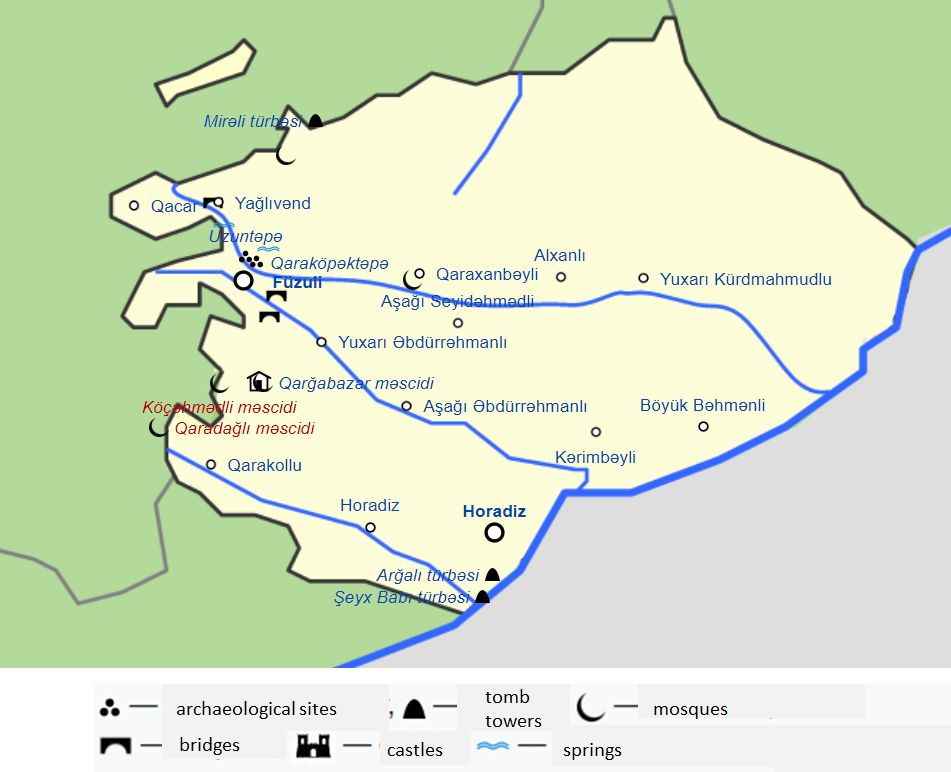
Map of attractions in the Fuzuli District

Fuzuli District (Azerbaijani: Füzuli rayonu) is one of the 66 districts of Azerbaijan. It is located in the south-west of the country and belongs to the Karabakh Economic Region. The district borders the districts of Khojavend, Aghjabadi, Beylagan, Jabrayil, and the Ardabil Province of Iran.

Its capital is Fuzuli, however since the city is completely ruined following the First Nagorno-Karabakh War, the current de facto capital is Horadiz until Fuzuli is rebuilt. As of 2020, the district had a nominal population of 133,800.

== History ==
The western half, including the capital, was captured by Armenian militias and controlled by the self-proclaimed Nagorno-Karabakh Republic, as a result of the First Nagorno-Karabakh War. Horadiz became the temporary administrative centre of Fuzuli District due to the city of Fuzuli's occupation by Armenian forces on 23 August 1993.

On October 17, 2020, most of the occupied portion of the district including the capital Fuzuli was announced to have been recaptured by Azerbaijan during the 2020 Nagorno-Karabakh war.

On October 20, 2020, the Government of Azerbaijan announced the recapture of Dordchinar, Kurdlar, Yukhari Abdurrahmanli, Garghabazar, Ashaghi Veysalli and Yukhari Aybasanli villages of Fuzuli District from Armenian forces. Six more villages (Gejagozlu, Ashaghi Seyidahmadli, Zargar, Mollavali, Yukhari Rafadinli and Ashaghi Rafadinli) of the district were reportedly recaptured between October 21 and 22, according to Azerbaijani sources.

== Displaced People ==
IDPs from Nagorno-Karabakh and the surrounding regions were moved to the Fuzuli District from tent settlements around the country to live in new houses built by the government.

== See also ==
- Armenian-occupied territories surrounding Nagorno-Karabakh
