= Wrestling at the 1972 Summer Olympics – Men's Greco-Roman 52 kg =

Men's Greco-Roman 52 kg at the Games of the XX Olympiad
- Venue: Messe München
- Dates: 5–10 September 1972
- Competitors: 21 from 21 nations

Medalists
| 1st place, gold medalist(s) | | Petar Kirov | Bulgaria |
| 2nd place, silver medalist(s) | | Koichiro Hirayama | Japan |
| 3rd place, bronze medalist(s) | | Giuseppe Bognanni | Italy |

The Men's Greco-Roman 52 kg at the 1972 Summer Olympics as part of the wrestling program at the Fairgrounds, Judo and Wrestling Hall.

== Medalists ==
| Gold | Petar Kirov; Bulgaria |
| Silver | Koichiro Hirayama; Japan |
| Bronze | Giuseppe Bognanni; Italy |

== Tournament results ==
The competition used a form of negative points tournament, with negative points given for any result short of a fall. Accumulation of 6 negative points eliminated the wrestler. When only two or three wrestlers remain, a special final round is used to determine the order of the medals.

Legend

- DNA — Did not appear
- TPP — Total penalty points
- MPP — Match penalty points

Penalties

- 0 — Won by Fall, Passivity, Injury and Forfeit
- 0.5 — Won by Technical Superiority
- 1 — Won by Points
- 2 — Draw
- 2.5 — Draw, Passivity
- 3 — Lost by Points
- 3.5 — Lost by Technical Superiority
- 4 — Lost by Fall, Passivity, Injury and Forfeit

=== Round 1 ===
| TPP | MPP | | Time | | MPP | TPP |
|---|---|---|---|---|---|---|
| 4 | 4 | Mahdi Houryar (IRI) | 6:33 | Petar Kirov (BUL) | 0 | 0 |
| 1 | 1 | Miroslav Zeman (TCH) | | Mohamed Karmous (MAR) | 3 | 3 |
| 0 | 0 | Jamsrangiin Mönkh–Ochir (MGL) | 0:00 | James Steiger (USA) | 4 | 4 |
| 4 | 4 | Trond Martiniussen (NOR) | 2:40 | Fritz Huber (FRG) | 0 | 0 |
| 4 | 4 | Gheorghe Stoiciu (ROU) | 6:43 | József Doncsecz (HUN) | 4 | 4 |
| 0 | 0 | Boško Marinko (YUG) | 4:29 | Javier León (PER) | 4 | 4 |
| 3 | 3 | Enrique Jiménez (MEX) | | Ahmet Tren (TUR) | 1 | 1 |
| 0 | 0 | Vasilios Ganotis (GRE) | 6:56 | Leonel Duarte (POR) | 4 | 4 |
| 0.5 | 0.5 | Vitali Konstantinov (URS) | | Abdel Fattah Sayed Ibrahim (EGY) | 3.5 | 3.5 |
| 1 | 1 | Koichiro Hirayama (JPN) | | Giuseppe Bognanni (ITA) | 3 | 3 |
| 1 | 1 | Jan Michalik (POL) | | Pertti Ukkola (FIN) | 3 | 3 |

=== Round 2 ===
| TPP | MPP | | Time | | MPP | TPP |
|---|---|---|---|---|---|---|
| 7 | 3 | Mehdi Houryar (IRI) | | Miroslav Zeman (TCH) | 1 | 2 |
| 0 | 0 | Petar Kirov (BUL) | 6:39 | Mohamed Karmous (MAR) | 4 | 7 |
| 0 | 0 | Jamsrangiin Mönkh-Ochir (MGL) | 7:07 | Trond Martiniussen (NOR) | 4 | 8 |
| 3 | 3 | Fritz Huber (FRG) | | Gheorghe Stoiciu (ROU) | 1 | 5 |
| 4 | 0 | József Doncsecz (HUN) | 8:28 | Boško Marinko (YUG) | 4 | 4 |
| 8 | 4 | Javier León (PER) | 5:28 | Enrique Jiménez (MEX) | 0 | 3 |
| 3 | 2 | Ahmet Tren (TUR) | | Vasilios Ganotis (GRE) | 2 | 2 |
| 8 | 4 | Leonel Duarte (POR) | 7:51 | Koichiro Hirayama (JPN) | 0 | 1 |
| 4.5 | 4 | Vitali Konstantinov (URS) | 2:37 | Giuseppe Bognanni (ITA) | 0 | 3 |
| 1 | | Jan Michalik (POL) | | Bye | | |
| 4 | | James Steiger (USA) | | DNA | | |
| 3.5 | | Abdelfattah Ibrahim (EGY) | | DNA | | |
| 3 | | Pertti Ukkola (FIN) | | DNA | | |

=== Round 3 ===
| TPP | MPP | | Time | | MPP | TPP |
|---|---|---|---|---|---|---|
| 4 | 3 | Jan Michalik (POL) | | Petar Kirov (BUL) | 1 | 1 |
| 2 | 0 | Miroslav Zeman (TCH) | 1:50 | Jamsrangiin Mönkh-Ochir (MGL) | 4 | 4 |
| 6 | 3 | Fritz Huber (FRG) | | József Doncsecz (HUN) | 1 | 5 |
| 9 | 4 | Gheorghe Stoiciu (ROU) | 8:20 | Boško Marinko (YUG) | 0 | 4 |
| 7 | 4 | Enrique Jiménez (MEX) | 8:28 | Vasilios Ganotis (GRE) | 0 | 2 |
| 6 | 3 | Ahmet Tren (TUR) | | Giuseppe Bognanni (ITA) | 1 | 4 |
| 7.5 | 3 | Vitali Konstantinov (URS) | | Koichiro Hirayama (JPN) | 1 | 2 |

=== Round 4 ===
| TPP | MPP | | Time | | MPP | TPP |
|---|---|---|---|---|---|---|
| 5 | 1 | Jan Michalik (POL) | | Miroslav Zeman (TCH) | 3 | 5 |
| 1 | 0 | Petar Kirov (BUL) | 6:58 | Jamsrangiin Mönkh-Ochir (MGL) | 4 | 8 |
| 5 | 0 | József Doncsecz (HUN) | 7:31 | Vasilios Ganotis (GRE) | 4 | 6 |
| 8 | 4 | Boško Marinko (YUG) | 3:31 | Koichiro Hirayama (JPN) | 0 | 2 |
| 4 | | Giuseppe Bognanni (ITA) | | Bye | | |

=== Round 5 ===
| TPP | MPP | | Time | | MPP | TPP |
|---|---|---|---|---|---|---|
| 5 | 1 | Giuseppe Bognanni (ITA) | | Jan Michalik (POL) | 3 | 8 |
| 2 | 1 | Petar Kirov (BUL) | | Miroslav Zeman (TCH) | 3 | 8 |
| 8 | 3 | József Doncsecz (HUN) | | Koichiro Hirayama (JPN) | 1 | 3 |

=== Final ===
Results from the preliminary round are carried forward into the final (shown in yellow).

| TPP | MPP | | Time | | MPP | TPP |
|---|---|---|---|---|---|---|
| | 1 | Koichiro Hirayama (JPN) | | Giuseppe Bognanni (ITA) | 3 | |
| 7 | 4 | Giuseppe Bognanni (ITA) | 6:38 | Petar Kirov (BUL) | 0 | |
| 5 | 4 | Koichiro Hirayama (JPN) | 5:49 | Petar Kirov (BUL) | 4 | 4 |

== Final standings ==
1. Petar Kirov (BUL)
2. Koichiro Hirayama (JPN)
3. Giuseppe Bognanni (ITA)
4. Miroslav Zeman (TCH), Jan Michalik (POL) and József Doncsecz (HUN)
