= Wrestling at the 1968 Summer Olympics – Men's Greco-Roman 52 kg =

Men's Greco-Roman 52 kg at the Games of the XIX Olympiad
- Venue: Insurgentes Ice Rink
- Dates: 23–26 October 1968
- Competitors: 24 from 24 nations

Medalists
1st place, gold medalist(s)		Petar Kirov	Bulgaria
2nd place, silver medalist(s)		Vladimir Bakulin	Soviet Union
3rd place, bronze medalist(s)		Miroslav Zeman	Czechoslovakia

The Men's Greco-Roman flyweight at the 1968 Summer Olympics as part of the wrestling program were held at the Insurgentes Ice Rink. The flyweight was the lightest weight class, allowing wrestlers up to 52 kilograms.

== Medalists ==
Gold	Petar Kirov; Bulgaria
Silver	Vladimir Bakulin; Soviet Union
Bronze	Miroslav Zeman; Czechoslovakia

== Tournament results ==
The competition used a form of negative points tournament, with negative points given for any result short of a fall. Accumulation of 6 negative points eliminated the wrestler. When only two or three wrestlers remain, a special final round is used to determine the order of the medals.

Legend

- TF — Won by Fall
- DQ — Won by Passivity or forfeit
- D2 — Both wrestlers lost by Passivity
- DNA — Did not appear
- TPP — Total penalty points
- MPP — Match penalty points

Penalties

- 0 — Won by Fall and Disqualification
- 0.5 — Won by Technical Superiority
- 1 — Won by Points
- 2 — Draw
- 2.5 — Draw, Passivity
- 3 — Lost by Points
- 3.5 — Lost by Technical Superiority
- 4 — Lost by Fall and Disqualification

=== 1st round ===
TPP	MPP		Score		MPP	TPP
2	2	Ahmed Chahrour (SYR)		Mohamed Salem (EGY)	2	2
4	4	Leonel Duarte (POR)	TF / 5:20	Miroslav Zeman (TCH)	0	0
3	3	Alex Børger (DEN)		Shin Sang-Sik (KOR)	1	1
0	0	Enrique Jiménez (MEX)	TF / 1:25	Gustavo Ramírez (GUA)	4	4
2.5	2.5	Imre Alker (HUN)		Rolf Lacour (FRG)	2.5	2.5
2	2	Sudesh Kumar (IND)		Mohamed Karmous (MAR)	2	2
3	3	André Gaudinot (FRA)		Boško Marinko (YUG)	1	1
1	1	Gheorghe Stoiciu (ROU)		Jan Michalik (POL)	3	3
0	0	Jussi Vesterinen (FIN)	DQ / 9:45	Shuichi Ishiguro (JPN)	4	4
3	3	Domenico Centurioni (ITA)		Vasilios Ganotis (GRE)	1	1
1	1	Petar Kirov (BUL)		Metin Çıkmaz (TUR)	3	3
3	3	Richard Tamble (USA)		Vladimir Bakulin (URS)	1	1

=== 2nd round ===
TPP	MPP		Score		MPP	TPP
2.5	0.5	Ahmed Chahrour (SYR)		Leonel Duarte (POR)	3.5	7.5
5	3	Mohamed Mongued (EGY)		Miroslav Zeman (TCH)	1	1
5	2	Alex Børger (DEN)		Enrique Jiménez (MEX)	2	2
1	0	Shin Sang-Sik (KOR)	TF / 0:56	Gustavo Ramírez (GUA)	4	8
2.5	0	Imre Alker (HUN)	TF / 2:57	Sudesh Kumar (IND)	4	6
2.5	0	Rolf Lacour (FRG)	DQ	Mohamed Karmous (MAR)	4	6
3.5	2.5	Boško Marinko (YUG)		Gheorghe Stoiciu (ROU)	2.5	3.5
6	3	Jan Michalik (POL)		Jussi Vesterinen (FIN)	1	1
8	4	Shuichi Ishiguro (JPN)	TF / 2:01	Domenico Centurioni (ITA)	0	3
4	3	Vasilios Ganotis (GRE)		Petar Kirov (BUL)	1	2
4	1	Metin Çıkmaz (TUR)		Richard Tamble (USA)	3	6
1		Vladimir Bakulin (URS)		Bye		
3		André Gaudinot (FRA)		DNA		

=== 3rd round ===
TPP	MPP		Score		MPP	TPP
1	0	Vladimir Bakulin (URS)	DQ	Ahmed Chahrour (SYR)	4	6.5
1	0	Miroslav Zeman (TCH)	TF / 1:55	Alex Børger (DEN)	4	9
4	3	Shin Sang-Sik (KOR)		Enrique Jiménez (MEX)	1	3
3.5	1	Imre Alker (HUN)		Boško Marinko (YUG)	3	6.5
2.5	0	Rolf Lacour (FRG)	TF / 1:52	Gheorghe Stoiciu (ROU)	4	7.5
2	1	Jussi Vesterinen (FIN)		Vasilios Ganotis (GRE)	3	7
6	3	Domenico Centurioni (ITA)		Petar Kirov (BUL)	1	3
4		Metin Çıkmaz (TUR)		Bye		
5		Mohamed Mongued (EGY)		DNA		

=== 4th round ===
TPP	MPP		Score		MPP	TPP
7	3	Metin Çıkmaz (TUR)		Vladimir Bakulin (URS)	1	2
2	1	Miroslav Zeman (TCH)		Shin Sang-Sik (KOR)	3	7
6	3	Enrique Jiménez (MEX)		Imre Alker (HUN)	1	4.5
5	2.5	Rolf Lacour (FRG)		Jussi Vesterinen (FIN)	2.5	4.5
3		Petar Kirov (BUL)		Bye		

=== 5th round ===
TPP	MPP		Score		MPP	TPP
4	1	Petar Kirov (BUL)		Vladimir Bakulin (URS)	3	5
5	3	Miroslav Zeman (TCH)		Rolf Lacour (FRG)	1	6
5.5	1	Imre Alker (HUN)		Jussi Vesterinen (FIN)	3	7.5

=== 6th round ===
TPP	MPP		Score		MPP	TPP
5	1	Petar Kirov (BUL)		Miroslav Zeman (TCH)	3	8
6	1	Vladimir Bakulin (URS)		Imre Alker (HUN)	3	8.5

== Final standings ==
1. Petar Kirov (BUL)
2. Vladimir Bakulin (URS)
3. Miroslav Zeman (TCH)
4. Imre Alker (HUN)
5. Rolf Lacour (FRG)
6. Jussi Vesterinen (FIN)
