= Athletics at the 1967 Mediterranean Games =

1967 Athletics at the Mediterranean Games

- Dates: 13–16 September
- Host city: (Tunisia) Tunis
- Venue: Stade El Menzah
- Events: 22 + 6
- Participation: 12 nations

Athletics at the 1967 Mediterranean Games were held in Tunis, Tunisia and took place from 13 to 16 September. It was the first time that women competed at the Mediterranean Games.

== Medal table ==
* Host nation (Tunisia)

Rank	Nation	Gold	Silver	Bronze	Total
1	Italy	14	6	6	26
2	Tunisia*	4	7	4	15
3	Yugoslavia	4	5	3	12
4	Spain	2	5	8	15
5	Greece	2	2	4	8
6	France	2	1	1	4
7	Turkey	0	2	0	2
8	Algeria	0	0	2	2
Totals (8 entries)		28	28	28	84

== Medal summary ==
=== Men's events ===
Event	Gold		Silver		Bronze	
100 metres	Charis Ayvaliotis (GRE)	10.6	Pasquale Giannattasio (ITA)	10.6	Ennio Preatoni (ITA)	10.8
200 metres	Ito Giani (ITA)	21.1	Livio Berruti (ITA)	21.2	Miguel Irandegui (ESP)	21.3
400 metres	Sergio Bello (ITA)	47.7	Rogelio Rivas (ESP)	47.9	Nikolaos Regoukos (GRE)	47.9
800 metres	Pierre Toussaint (FRA)	1:54.3	Youssef Nasri (TUN)	1:54.7	Virgilio González (ESP)	1:54.7
1500 metres	Renzo Finelli (ITA)	3:49.6 GR	José María Morera (ESP)	3:50.0	Jorge González (ESP)	3:50.5
5000 metres	Mohammed Gammoudi (TUN)	14:02.2 GR	Drago Žuntar (YUG)	14:04.2	Giuseppe Cindolo (ITA)	14:05.0
10,000 metres	Mohammed Gammoudi (TUN)	31:01.6	Ali Khamassi (TUN)	31:22.8	Drago Žuntar (YUG)	31:35.0
Marathon	Antonio Ambu (ITA)	2:21:31 GR	İsmail Akçay (TUR)	2:21:44	Carlos Pérez (ESP)	2:23:04
110 metres hurdles	Giovanni Cornacchia (ITA)	14.2	Sergio Liani (ITA)	14.2	Athanassios Lazaridis (GRE)	14.7
400 metres hurdles	Alessandro Scatena (ITA)	52.9	Mehmet Gesas (TUR)	53.4	Manuel Gayoso (ESP)	53.9
3000 m steeplechase	Javier Álvarez (ESP)	8:44.3 GR	Labidi Ayachi (TUN)	8:48.4	Mariano Haro (ESP)	8:50.0
4×100 metres relay	Italy (ITA); Ito Giani; Ennio Preatoni; Pasquale Giannattasio; Carlo Laverda	40.6	Spain (ESP); Miguel Irandegui; Pedro Carda; Juan Carlos Jones; José Luis Sánchez	41.6	Tunisia (TUN); Ajailia; Miguel M'Zoughi; Arfa; Mohamed Belkhodja	42.7
4×400 metres relay	Italy (ITA); Sergio Bello; Furio Fusi; Sergio Ottolina; Giacomo Puosi	3:12.6	Spain (ESP); Rogelio Rivas; Álvaro González; Ramón Magariños; Virgilio González	3:15.9	Tunisia (TUN); Moktar Herzi; Chamman; Hamida Gammoudi; Youssef Nasri	3:20.9
20 km walk	Nicola De Vito (ITA)	1:38:42.6 GR	Chedli Benali (TUN)	1:39:08.6	Hamed Nadhari (TUN)	1:43:58.2
50 km walk	Vittorio Visini (ITA)	4:39:53.7	Naceur Ben Messaoud (TUN)	4:43:48.6	Hamed Nadhari (TUN)	4:52:43.5
High jump	Miodrag Todosijević (YUG)	2.13 m GR	Ioannis Kousoulas (GRE)	2.05 m	Polde Milek (YUG)	2.02 m
Pole vault	Christos Papanikolaou (GRE)	5.15 m GR	Renato Dionisi (ITA)	4.90 m	Jean-Pierre Colusso (FRA)	4.70 m
Long jump	Miljenko Rak (YUG)	7.53 m	Panagiotis Khatzistathis (GRE)	7.51 m	Rafael Blanquer (ESP)	7.50 m
Triple jump	Luis Felipe Areta (ESP)	16.23 m GR	Giuseppe Gentile (ITA)	16.04 m	Michail Karagiannis (GRE)	15.45 m
Shot put	Tomislav Šuker (YUG)	18.01 m GR	Arnjolt Beer (FRA)	17.72 m	Milija Jocović (YUG)	17.53 m
Discus throw	Silvano Simeon (ITA)	57.30 m GR	Marian Gredelj (YUG)	55.90 m	Gilberto Ferrini (ITA)	53.72 m
Javelin throw	Franco Radman (ITA)	69.20 m	Alfonso de Andrés (ESP)	66.78 m	Fernando Tallón (ESP)	64.10 m

=== Women's events ===
Event	Gold		Silver		Bronze	
100 metres	Sylviane Telliez (FRA)	11.8	Donata Govoni (ITA)	11.9	Patrizia Seriau (ITA)	12.4
80 metres hurdles	Carla Panerai (ITA)	11.3	Đurđa Fočić (YUG)	11.4	Magalì Vettorazzo (ITA)	11.5
High jump	Snežana Hrepevnik (YUG)	1.70 m	Đurđa Fočić (YUG)	1.61 m	Luciana Giamperlati (ITA)	1.58 m
Long jump	Maria Vittoria Trio (ITA)	6.13 m	Đurđa Fočić (YUG)	5.75 m	Charoula Sassagianni (GRE)	5.74 m
Shot put	Beya Bouabdallah (TUN)	11.57 m	Djemai El Hem (TUN)	9.10 m	Rabea Ghezlane (ALG)	8.36 m
Javelin throw	Chedlia Ben Mrad (TUN)	33.10 m	Beya Bouabdallah (TUN)	30.84 m	Rabea Ghezlane (ALG)	24.78 m

== Men's results ==
=== 100 meters ===
Heats – 13 September

Rank	Heat	Name	Nationality	Time	Notes
1	1	Pasquale Giannattasio	Italy	10.7	Q
2	1	Miguel Irandegui	Spain	10.8	Q
3	1	Hassan El-Mech	Morocco	11.0	Q
4	1	Miguel M'Zoughi	Tunisia	11.2	Q
1	2	Charis Ayvaliotis	Greece	10.6	Q, GR
2	2	Ennio Preatoni	Italy	10.8	Q
3	2	José Luis Sánchez	Spain	11.0	Q
4	2	Mohamed Belkhodja	Tunisia	11.0	Q

Final – 15 September

Rank	Name	Nationality	Time	Notes
1st place, gold medalist(s)	Charis Ayvaliotis	Greece	10.6	=GR
2nd place, silver medalist(s)	Pasquale Giannattasio	Italy	10.6	=GR
3rd place, bronze medalist(s)	Ennio Preatoni	Italy	10.8	
4	Mohamed Belkhodja	Tunisia	10.8	
5	José Luis Sánchez	Spain	10.9	
6	Miguel Irandegui	Spain	11.2	
7	Miguel M'Zoughi	Tunisia	11.3	
8	Hassan El-Mech	Morocco	12.3	

=== 200 meters ===
Heats – 15 September
Wind: Heat 1: +1.0 m/s, Heat 2: +0.1 m/s

Rank	Heat	Name	Nationality	Time	Notes
1	1	Ippolito Giani	Italy	21.96	Q
2	1	Ramón Magariños	Spain	22.22	Q, NR
3	1	Ahmed Tubraki	Libya	22.2	Q
4	1	Godwin Zammit	Malta	23.4	Q
1	2	Livio Berruti	Italy	21.76	Q
2	2	Miguel Irandegui	Spain	22.17	Q, NR
3	2	Charis Ayvaliotis	Greece	22.38	Q
4	2	Talbi Rahal	Morocco	22.4	Q
5	2	Laroussi Ajailia	Tunisia	22.8	
6	2	Mohamed Abou Dulekhi	Libya	23.1	

Final – 16 September

Rank	Name	Nationality	Time	Notes
1st place, gold medalist(s)	Ippolito Giani	Italy	21.1	GR
2nd place, silver medalist(s)	Livio Berruti	Italy	21.2	
3rd place, bronze medalist(s)	Miguel Irandegui	Spain	21.3	
4	Ramón Magariños	Spain	21.8	
5	Ahmed Tubraki	Libya	22.2	
6	Godwin Zammit	Malta	23.3	
	Charis Ayvaliotis	Greece	DNF	
	Talbi Rahal	Morocco	DNF	

=== 400 meters ===
Heats – 14 September

Rank	Heat	Name	Nationality	Time	Notes
1	1	Sergio Bello	Italy	49.9	Q
?	?	Moktar Herzi	Tunisia	50.2	Q
3	1	Rogelio Rivas	Spain	50.4	Q
?	?	Nikolaos Regoukos	Greece	50.5	Q

Final – 15 September

Rank	Name	Nationality	Time	Notes
1st place, gold medalist(s)	Sergio Bello	Italy	47.7	
2nd place, silver medalist(s)	Rogelio Rivas	Spain	47.9	
3rd place, bronze medalist(s)	Nikolaos Regoukos	Greece	47.9	
4	Moktar Herzi	Tunisia	49.2	
5	Moulay Ahmed Hasnaoui	Morocco	49.4	
6	Dimitrios Tombaidis	Greece	49.6	
7	Moulay Aomar El Amrany	Morocco	51.1	
	Chérif Sadok	Tunisia	DNF	

=== 800 meters ===
Heats – 13 September

Rank	Heat	Name	Nationality	Time	Notes
1	1	Pierre Toussaint	France	1:52.0	Q
2	1	Virgilio González	Spain	1:52.5	Q
3	1	Gianfranco Carabelli	Italy	1:52.8	Q
4	1	Mohamed Seghaier Hamdouni	Tunisia	?:??.?	Q
1	2	Youssef Nasri	Tunisia	1:54.5	Q
2	2	Mustafa El Fennan	Morocco	1:55.0	Q
3	2	Konstantinos Michailidis	Greece	1:55.0	Q
4	2	Gianni Del Bueno	Italy	1:56.3	Q

Final – 14 September

Rank	Name	Nationality	Time	Notes
1st place, gold medalist(s)	Pierre Toussaint	France	1:54.3	
2nd place, silver medalist(s)	Youssef Nasri	Tunisia	1:54.7	
3rd place, bronze medalist(s)	Virgilio González	Spain	1:54.7	
4	Gianfranco Carabelli	Italy	1:55.1	
5	Gianni Del Bueno	Italy	1:55.3	
6	Mustafa El Fennan	Morocco	1:57.2	
	Konstantinos Michailidis	Greece	DNF	
	Mohamed Seghaier Hamdouni	Tunisia	DNF	

=== 1500 meters ===
15 September

Rank	Name	Nationality	Time	Notes
1st place, gold medalist(s)	Renzo Finelli	Italy	3:49.6	GR
2nd place, silver medalist(s)	José María Morera	Spain	3:50.0	
3rd place, bronze medalist(s)	Jorge González	Spain	3:50.5	
4	Hamida Gammoudi	Tunisia	3:52.5	
5	Ioannis Birbilis	Greece	3:52.8	
6	Abdellatif Derradji	Algeria	3:58.7	

=== 5000 meters ===
16 September

Rank	Name	Nationality	Time	Notes
1st place, gold medalist(s)	Mohamed Gammoudi	Tunisia	14:02.2	GR
2nd place, silver medalist(s)	Drago Žuntar	Yugoslavia	14:04.2	
3rd place, bronze medalist(s)	Giuseppe Cindolo	Italy	14:05.0	
4	Javier Álvarez	Spain	14:10.8	
5	Ahmed Zammel	Tunisia	14:12.2	
6	Ioannis Birbilis	Greece	14:28.9	
7	Fernando Aguilar	Spain	??:??.?	
8	L. Oukada	Morocco	??:??.?	
9	S.G. Ben Moha	Morocco	??:??.?	
10	M.A. Laghmari	Lebanon	??:??.?	
11	S.H. Breki	Lebanon	??:??.?	
12	J. Bonello	Malta	??:??.?	

=== 10,000 meters ===
15 September

Rank	Name	Nationality	Time	Notes
1st place, gold medalist(s)	Mohamed Gammoudi	Tunisia	31:01.6	
2nd place, silver medalist(s)	Ali Khamassi	Tunisia	31:22.8	
3rd place, bronze medalist(s)	Drago Žuntar	Yugoslavia	31:35.0	
4	Antonio Ambu	Italy	31:45.0	
5	Saïd Ben Mohamed Gerouani	Morocco	?:??.?	
6	Carlos Pérez	Spain	31:58.0	
7	José Miguel Maiz	Spain	32:05.4	
8	Antonio Giancaterino	Italy	32:22.2	
9	S.H. Breki	Lebanon	??:??.?	
10	M.A. Laghmari	Lebanon	??:??.?	

=== Marathon ===
16 September

Rank	Name	Nationality	Time	Notes
1st place, gold medalist(s)	Antonio Ambu	Italy	2:21:31	GR
2nd place, silver medalist(s)	İsmail Akçay	Turkey	2:21:44	
3rd place, bronze medalist(s)	Carlos Pérez	Spain	2:23:04	
4	Allal Ben Saoudi	Tunisia	2:30:45	
5	Hüseyin Aktaş	Turkey	2:32.25	
5	Abdelkader Zaddem	Tunisia	2:39.40	

=== 110 meters hurdles ===
Heats – 13 September

Rank	Heat	Name	Nationality	Time	Notes
1	1	Giovanni Cornacchia	Italy	14.7	Q
?	?	Çetin Şahiner	Turkey	15.2	Q
1	2	Sergio Liani	Italy	15.3	Q
?	?	Athanassios Lazaridis	Greece	15.4	Q
?	?	Aboubaker Mejbri	Libya	15.5	Q
?	?	Djilali Sekkouri	Morocco	15.7	Q
?	?	Abdelkader Boudjemaa	Algeria	15.9	Q
?	?	Brahim Chalghoumi	Tunisia	16.2	Q

Final – 15 September

Rank	Name	Nationality	Time	Notes
1st place, gold medalist(s)	Giovanni Cornacchia	Italy	14.2	
2nd place, silver medalist(s)	Sergio Liani	Italy	14.2	
3rd place, bronze medalist(s)	Athanassios Lazaridis	Greece	14.7	
4	Çetin Şahiner	Turkey	15.1	
5	Aboubaker Mejbri	Libya	15.7	
6	Djilali Sekkouri	Morocco	15.7	
7	Abdelkader Boudjemaa	Algeria	15.9	
8	Brahim Chalghoumi	Tunisia	16.1	

=== 400 meters hurdles ===
Heats – 13 September

Rank	Heat	Name	Nationality	Time	Notes\
2	1	Roberto Frinolli	Italy	57.3	Q
3	1	Pedro Carda	Spain	57.6	Q
1	2	Manuel Gayoso	Spain	53.66	Q, NR
2	2	Alessandro Scatena	Italy	54.97	Q
3	2	Chérif Sadok	Tunisia	55.01	Q
4	2	Mehmet Gesas	Turkey	55.03	Q
5	2	Muhammad Assway Califa	Libya	58.2	

Final – 15 September

Rank	Name	Nationality	Time	Notes
1st place, gold medalist(s)	Alessandro Scatena	Italy	52.9	
2nd place, silver medalist(s)	Mehmet Gesas	Turkey	53.4	
3rd place, bronze medalist(s)	Manuel Gayoso	Spain	53.9	
4	Cengiz Akıncı	Turkey	54.4	
5	Pedro Carda	Spain	54.5	
6	Abdellatif Trabelsi	Tunisia	56.6	
	Chérif Sadok	Tunisia	DNF	
	Roberto Frinolli	Italy	DNS	

=== 3000 meters steeplechase ===
15 September

Rank	Name	Nationality	Time	Notes
1st place, gold medalist(s)	Javier Álvarez	Spain	8:44.3	GR
2nd place, silver medalist(s)	Labidi Ayachi	Tunisia	8:48.4	
3rd place, bronze medalist(s)	Mariano Haro	Spain	8:50.0	
4	Giovanni Pizzi	Italy	8:50.0	
5	Umberto Risi	Italy	9:14.4	
6	Mohamed Seghaier Hamdouni	Tunisia	9:25.0	

=== 4 × 100 meters relay ===
14 September

Rank	Nation	Competitors	Time	Notes
1st place, gold medalist(s)	Italy	Ito Giani, Ennio Preatoni, Pasquale Giannattasio, Carlo Laverda	40.6	
2nd place, silver medalist(s)	Spain	Miguel Irandegui, Pedro Carda, Juan Carlos Jones, José Luis Sánchez	41.45	NR
3rd place, bronze medalist(s)	Tunisia	Ajailia, Miguel M'Zoughi, Arfa, Mohamed Belkhodja	42.7	
4	Malta	Godwin Zammit, Hobbs, Grech, Chircop	44.5	

=== 4 × 400 meters relay ===
16 September

Rank	Nation	Competitors	Time	Notes
1st place, gold medalist(s)	Italy	Sergio Bello, Furio Fusi, Sergio Ottolina, Giacomo Puosi	3:12.6	
2nd place, silver medalist(s)	Spain	Rogelio Rivas, Álvaro González, Ramón Magariños, Virgilio González	3:15.9	
3rd place, bronze medalist(s)	Tunisia	Moktar Herzi, Chamman, Hamida Gammoudi, Youssef Nasri	3:20.9	
4	Morocco		3:20.9	
5	Libya		3:22.3	

=== 20 kilometers walk ===
13 September

Rank	Name	Nationality	Time	Notes
1st place, gold medalist(s)	Nicola De Vito	Italy	1:38:43	GR
2nd place, silver medalist(s)	Chedli Benali	Tunisia	1:39:09	
3rd place, bronze medalist(s)	Hamed Nadhari	Tunisia	1:43:58	
4	Jaral Mabrouk	Libya	1:46:18	
5	Ali Burki	Libya	1:47:38	
6	Aynur Ayhan	Turkey	1:50:27	

=== 50 kilometers walk ===
15 September

Rank	Name	Nationality	Time	Notes
1st place, gold medalist(s)	Vittorio Visisni	Italy	4:39:54	
2nd place, silver medalist(s)	Naceur Ben Ahmed Messaoud	Tunisia	4:43:49	
3rd place, bronze medalist(s)	Hamed Nadhari	Tunisia	4:52:43	
4	Ahmed Yekou	Libya	?:??.?	
5	Abdullsalem Shonshen	Libya	?:??.?	

=== High jump ===
16 September

Rank	Name	Nationality	Result	Notes
1st place, gold medalist(s)	Miodrag Todosijević	Yugoslavia	2.13	GR, NR
2nd place, silver medalist(s)	Ioannis Kousoulas	Greece	2.05	
3rd place, bronze medalist(s)	Polde Milek	Yugoslavia	2.02	
4	Jacques Madubost	France	2.02	
5	Jesús López	Spain	1.96	

=== Pole vault ===
14 September

Rank	Name	Nationality	Result	Notes
1st place, gold medalist(s)	Christos Papanikolaou	Greece	5.15	GR
2nd place, silver medalist(s)	Renato Dionisi	Italy	4.90	
3rd place, bronze medalist(s)	Jean-Pierre Colusso	France	4.70	
4	Ignacio Sola	Spain	4.60	
5	Pantelis Nikolaidis	Greece	4.50	

=== Long jump ===
14 September

Rank	Name	Nationality	#1	#2	#3	#4	#5	#6	Result	Notes
1st place, gold medalist(s)	Miljenko Rak	Yugoslavia							7.53	
2nd place, silver medalist(s)	Panagiotis Katseris	Greece							7.51	
3rd place, bronze medalist(s)	Rafael Blanquer	Spain	7.25	7.20	7.19	x	7.35	7.50	7.50	
4	Dimosthenis Magglaras	Greece							7.47	
5	Giuseppe Gentile	Italy							7.23	
6	Mokhtar Sayed	Morocco							7.04	NR
	Luis Felipe Areta	Spain	x	x	x				NM	

=== Triple jump ===
16 September

Rank	Name	Nationality	Result	Notes
1st place, gold medalist(s)	Luis Felipe Areta	Spain	16.23	GR, NR
2nd place, silver medalist(s)	Giuseppe Gentile	Italy	16.04	
3rd place, bronze medalist(s)	Michail Karagiannis	Greece	15.45	
4	Panagiotis Katseris	Greece	15.31	
5	Jesús Bartholomé	Spain	14.85	
6	Mokthar Seyad	Morocco	14.19	
7	Kamel Sellami	Turkey	13.75	

=== Shot put ===
14 September

Rank	Name	Nationality	Result	Notes
1st place, gold medalist(s)	Tomislav Šuker	Yugoslavia	18.01	GR
2nd place, silver medalist(s)	Arnjold Beer	France	17.72	
3rd place, bronze medalist(s)	Tomislav Šuker	Yugoslavia	17.53	
4	Lahcen Samsam Akka	Algeria	16.17	
5	Ahmed Bendiffalah	Algeria	13.57	
6	Omar Musa Mejbari	Libya	13.48	

=== Discus throw ===
15 September

Rank	Name	Nationality	Result	Notes
1st place, gold medalist(s)	Silvano Simeon	Italy	57.30	GR
2nd place, silver medalist(s)	Marian Gredelj	Yugoslavia	55.90	
3rd place, bronze medalist(s)	Gilberto Ferrini	Italy	53.72	
4	Ömer Çakır	Turkey	45.22	
5	Ahmed Bendiffalah	Algeria	41.28	
6	Belhassem Essedik	Tunisia	39.08	

=== Javelin throw ===
16 September

Rank	Name	Nationality	Result	Notes
1st place, gold medalist(s)	Franco Radman	Italy	69.20	
2nd place, silver medalist(s)	Alfonso de Andrés	Spain	66.78	
3rd place, bronze medalist(s)	Fernando Tallón	Spain	64.10	
4	Moncef Chtai	Tunisia	55.10	
5	Faraj Saffran	Libya	54.80	
6	Youcef Gouider	Tunisia	42.11	

== Women's results ==
=== 100 meters ===
16 September

Rank	Name	Nationality	Time	Notes
1st place, gold medalist(s)	Sylviane Telliez	France	11.8	GR
2nd place, silver medalist(s)	Donata Govoni	Italy	11.96	
3rd place, bronze medalist(s)	Patrizia Seriau	Italy	12.38	
4	Fatma Ben Hdar	Tunisia	13.0	
5	Fatma Askri	Tunisia	13.7	

=== 80 meters hurdles ===
15 September

Rank	Name	Nationality	Time	Notes
1st place, gold medalist(s)	Carla Panerai	Italy	11.32	GR
2nd place, silver medalist(s)	Đurđa Fočić	Yugoslavia	11.4	
3rd place, bronze medalist(s)	Magali Vettorazzo	Italy	11.58	
4	Rabea Ghezlane	Algeria	12.5	
5	Beya Bouabdallah	Tunisia	13.5	
6	Fatma Askri	Tunisia	13.6	

=== High jump ===
Rank	Name	Nationality	Result	Notes
1st place, gold medalist(s)	Snežana Hrepevnik	Yugoslavia	1.70	GR
2nd place, silver medalist(s)	Đurđa Fočić	Yugoslavia	1.61	
3rd place, bronze medalist(s)	Luciana Giamperlati	Italy	1.58	
4	Beya Bouabdallah	Tunisia	1.43	
5	Farida Chaouech	Algeria	1.43	

=== Long jump ===
15 September

Rank	Name	Nationality	Result	Notes
1st place, gold medalist(s)	Maria Vittoria Trio	Italy	6.13	GR
2nd place, silver medalist(s)	Đurđa Fočić	Yugoslavia	5.75	
3rd place, bronze medalist(s)	Charoula Sassagianni	Greece	5.74	
4	Djemai El Hem	Tunisia	4.65	
5	Rabea Ghezlane	Algeria	4.43	
6	Wassila Ben Soltane	Tunisia	4.20	

=== Shot put ===
Rank	Name	Nationality	Result	Notes
1st place, gold medalist(s)	Beya Bouabdallah	Tunisia	11.57	GR
2nd place, silver medalist(s)	Djemai El Hem	Tunisia	9.10	
3rd place, bronze medalist(s)	Rabea Ghezlane	Algeria	8.36	
4	Farida Chaouech	Algeria	7.77	

=== Javelin throw ===
Rank	Name	Nationality	Result	Notes
1st place, gold medalist(s)	Chedlia Ben Mrad	Tunisia	33.10	GR
2nd place, silver medalist(s)	Beya Bouabdallah	Tunisia	30.84	
3rd place, bronze medalist(s)	Rabea Ghezlane	Algeria	24.78	
4	Farida Chaouech	Algeria	20.78	
