= Wrestling at the 1967 Mediterranean Games =

Wrestling competition

- Dates: September 1967

The wrestling tournament at the 1967 Mediterranean Games was held in Tunis, Tunisia.

== Medal table ==
* Host nation (Tunisia)

Rank	Nation	Gold	Silver	Bronze	Total
1	Turkey	9	3	2	14
2	Yugoslavia	2	5	1	8
3	Greece	2	3	7	12
4	France	2	1	2	5
5	Italy	1	4	4	9
Totals (5 entries)		16	16	16	48

== Medalists ==
=== Men's freestyle ===
Event	Gold	Silver	Bronze
52 kg	Vincenzo Grassi; Italy	Boris Dimovski; Yugoslavia	Petros Triantafyllidis; Greece
57 kg	Bekir Aydın; Turkey	Giulio Silverio; Italy	Athanasios Zafeiropoulos; Greece
63 kg	Celal Pehlivan; Turkey	Boško Marinko; Yugoslavia	Nikos Karypidis; Greece
70 kg	Stefanos Ioannidis; Greece	Hüsamettin Öngör; Turkey	Luciano Alberti; Italy
78 kg	Daniel Robin; France	Osvaldo Ferrari; Italy	Vahit Uysal; Turkey
87 kg	Basri Yılmaz; Turkey	Umberto Marcheggiani; Italy	Milan Nenadić; Yugoslavia
97 kg	Hüseyin Gürsoy; Turkey	Josip Čorak; Yugoslavia	Marcel Levasseur; France
+97 kg	İsmail Topçam; Turkey	Raymond Blaud; France	Athanasios Nikolopoulos; Greece

=== Men's Greco-Roman ===
Event	Gold	Silver	Bronze
52 kg	Metin Çıkmaz; Turkey	Vasilios Ganotis; Greece	Domenico Centurioni; Italy
57 kg	Othon Moskhidis; Greece	Ünver Beşergil; Turkey	Serges Blancher; France
63 kg	Metin Alakoç; Turkey	Sreten Damjanović; Yugoslavia	Nikolaos Lazarou; Greece
70 kg	Stevan Horvat; Yugoslavia	Petros Galaktopoulos; Greece	Piero Bellotti; Italy
78 kg	Daniel Robin; France	Dimitrios Savvas; Greece	Sırrı Acar; Turkey
87 kg	Branislav Simić; Yugoslavia	Necdet Uçar; Turkey	Nikolaos Mouzakis; Greece
97 kg	Ömer Topuz; Turkey	Josip Čorak; Yugoslavia	Vito Loiacono; Italy
+97 kg	Gıyasettin Yılmaz; Turkey	Giuseppe Marcucci; Italy	Athanasios Nikolopoulos; Greece
