= Wrestling at the 1976 Summer Olympics – Men's Greco-Roman 52 kg =

Men's Greco-Roman 52 kg at the Games of the XXI Olympiad
- Venue: Maurice Richard Arena
- Dates: 20–24 July 1976
- Competitors: 17 from 17 nations

Medalists
| 1st place, gold medalist(s) | | Vitali Konstantinov | Soviet Union |
| 2nd place, silver medalist(s) | | Nicu Gingă | Romania |
| 3rd place, bronze medalist(s) | | Koichiro Hirayama | Japan |

The Men's Greco-Roman 52 kg at the 1976 Summer Olympics as part of the wrestling program were held at the Maurice Richard Arena.

== Medalists ==
| Gold | Vitali Konstantinov; Soviet Union |
| Silver | Nicu Gingă; Romania |
| Bronze | Koichiro Hirayama; Japan |

== Tournament results ==
The competition used a form of negative points tournament, with negative points given for any result short of a fall. Accumulation of 6 negative points eliminated the loser wrestler. When only three wrestlers remain, a special final round is used to determine the order of the medals.

Legend

- TF — Won by Fall
- IN — Won by Opponent Injury
- DQ — Won by Passivity
- D1 — Won by Passivity, the winner is passive too
- D2 — Both wrestlers lost by Passivity
- FF — Won by Forfeit
- DNA — Did not appear
- TPP — Total penalty points
- MPP — Match penalty points

Penalties

- 0 — Won by Fall, Technical Superiority, Passivity, Injury and Forfeit
- 0.5 — Won by Points, 8-11 points difference
- 1 — Won by Points, 1-7 points difference
- 2 — Won by Passivity, the winner is passive too
- 3 — Lost by Points, 1-7 points difference
- 3.5 — Lost by Points, 8-11 points difference
- 4 — Lost by Fall, Technical Superiority, Passivity, Injury and Forfeit

=== Round 1 ===
| TPP | MPP | | Score | | MPP | TPP |
|---|---|---|---|---|---|---|
| 1 | 1 | Lajos Rácz (HUN) | 13 - 9 | Haralambos Holidis (GRE) | 3 | 3 |
| 3.5 | 3.5 | Bruce Thompson (USA) | 7 - 15 | Rolf Krauß (FRG) | 0.5 | 0.5 |
| 4 | 4 | Leonel Duarte (POR) | DQ / 7:47 | Mohamed Karmous (MAR) | 0 | 0 |
| 0 | 0 | Nicu Gingă (ROU) | IN / 5:11 | Petar Kirov (BUL) | 4 | 4 |
| 1 | 1 | Vitali Konstantinov (URS) | 10 - 8 | Antonino Caltabiano (ITA) | 3 | 3 |
| 0 | 0 | Czesław Stanjek (POL) | DQ / 6:52 | Jamsrangiin Mönkh-Ochir (MGL) | 4 | 4 |
| 4 | 4 | Julien Mewis (BEL) | DQ / 8:40 | Baek Seung-hyeon (KOR) | 0 | 0 |
| 4 | 4 | Bilal Tabur (TUR) | DQ / 7:31 | Koichiro Hirayama (JPN) | 0 | 0 |
| 0 | | Morad Ali Shirani (IRI) | | Bye | | |

=== Round 2 ===
| TPP | MPP | | Score | | MPP | TPP |
|---|---|---|---|---|---|---|
| 3 | 3 | Morad Ali Shirani (IRI) | 6 - 9 | Lajos Rácz (HUN) | 1 | 2 |
| 7 | 4 | Haralambos Holidis (GRE) | TF / 7:23 | Bruce Thompson (USA) | 0 | 3.5 |
| 0.5 | 0 | Rolf Krauß (FRG) | TF / 2:41 | Leonel Duarte (POR) | 4 | 8 |
| 3 | 3 | Nicu Gingă (ROU) | 11 - 17 | Vitali Konstantinov (URS) | 1 | 2 |
| 4 | 1 | Antonino Caltabiano (ITA) | 11 - 6 | Czesław Stanjek (POL) | 3 | 3 |
| 7 | 3 | Jamsrangiin Mönkh-Ochir (MGL) | 12 - 16 | Julien Mewis (BEL) | 1 | 5 |
| 1 | 1 | Baek Seung-Hyun (KOR) | 9 - 6 | Bilal Tabur (TUR) | 3 | 7 |
| 0 | | Koichiro Hirayama (JPN) | | Bye | | |
| 0 | | Mohamed Karmous (MAR) | | DNA | | |
| 4 | | Petar Kirov (BUL) | | DNA | | |

=== Round 3 ===
| TPP | MPP | | Score | | MPP | TPP |
|---|---|---|---|---|---|---|
| 3 | 3 | Koichiro Hirayama (JPN) | 12 - 15 | Morad Ali Shirani (IRI) | 1 | 4 |
| 3 | 1 | Lajos Rácz (HUN) | 8 - 6 | Bruce Thompson (USA) | 3 | 6.5 |
| 4.5 | 4 | Rolf Krauß (FRG) | DQ / 7:06 | Nicu Gingă (ROU) | 0 | 3 |
| 2 | 0 | Vitali Konstantinov (URS) | 22 - 4 | Julien Mewis (BEL) | 4 | 9 |
| 4 | 0 | Antonino Caltabiano (ITA) | DQ / 7:25 | Baek Seung-Hyun (KOR) | 4 | 5 |
| 3 | | Czesław Stanjek (POL) | | DNA | | |

=== Round 4 ===
| TPP | MPP | | Score | | MPP | TPP |
|---|---|---|---|---|---|---|
| 4 | 1 | Koichiro Hirayama (JPN) | 5 - 2 | Lajos Rácz (HUN) | 3 | 6 |
| 7 | 3 | Morad Ali Shirani (IRI) | 10 - 16 | Rolf Krauß (FRG) | 1 | 5.5 |
| 3.5 | 0.5 | Nicu Gingă (ROU) | 11 - 1 | Antonino Caltabiano (ITA) | 3.5 | 7.5 |
| 2 | 0 | Vitali Konstantinov (URS) | TF / 7:32 | Baek Seung-Hyun (KOR) | 4 | 9 |

=== Round 5 ===
| TPP | MPP | | Score | | MPP | TPP |
|---|---|---|---|---|---|---|
| 8 | 4 | Koichiro Hirayama (JPN) | D1 / 5:45 | Nicu Gingă (ROU) | 2 | 5.5 |
| 8.5 | 3 | Rolf Krauß (FRG) | 11 - 16 | Vitali Konstantinov (URS) | 1 | 3 |

=== Final ===
Results from the preliminary round are carried forward into the final (shown in yellow).

| TPP | MPP | | Score | | MPP | TPP |
|---|---|---|---|---|---|---|
| | 3 | Nicu Gingă (ROU) | 11 - 17 | Vitali Konstantinov (URS) | 1 | |
| | 4 | Koichiro Hirayama (JPN) | D1 / 5:45 | Nicu Gingă (ROU) | 2 | 5 |
| 5 | 1 | Koichiro Hirayama (JPN) | 6 - 3 | Vitali Konstantinov (URS) | 3 | 4 |

== Final standings ==
1. Vitali Konstantinov (URS)
2. Nicu Gingă (ROU)
3. Koichiro Hirayama (JPN)
4. Rolf Krauß (FRG)
5. Lajos Rácz (HUN)
6. Morad Ali Shirani (IRI)
7. Antonino Caltabiano (ITA)
8. Baek Seung-Hyun (KOR)
