= Wrestling at the 1964 Summer Olympics – Men's Greco-Roman flyweight =

Wrestling at the Olympics

Men's Greco-Roman flyweight at the Games of the XVIII Olympiad
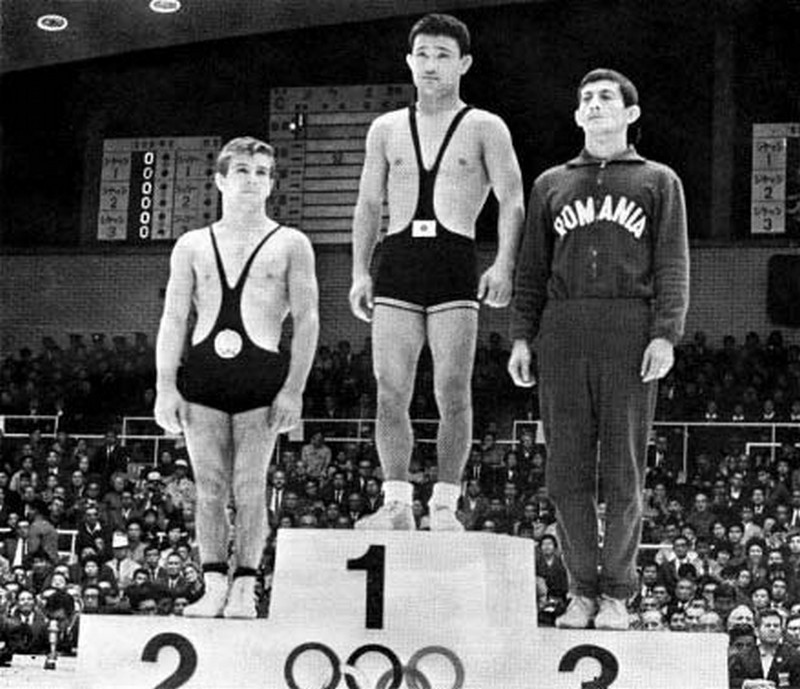
- Venue: Komazawa Gymnasium
- Dates: 16–19 October 1964
- Competitors: 18 from 18 nations

Medalists
1st place, gold medalist(s)		Tsutomu Hanahara	Japan
2nd place, silver medalist(s)		Angel Kerezov	Bulgaria
3rd place, bronze medalist(s)		Dumitru Pîrvulescu	Romania

The men's Greco-Roman flyweight competition at the 1964 Summer Olympics in Tokyo took place from 16 to 19 October at the Komazawa Gymnasium. Nations were limited to one competitor. Flyweight was the lightest category, including wrestlers weighing 52 kilograms (114.6 lb).

== Competition format ==
This Greco-Roman wrestling competition continued to use the "bad points" elimination system introduced at the 1928 Summer Olympics for Greco-Roman and at the 1932 Summer Olympics for freestyle wrestling, as adjusted at the 1960 Summer Olympics. Each bout awarded 4 points. If the victory was by fall, the winner received 0 and the loser 4. If the victory was by decision, the winner received 1 and the loser 3. If the bout was tied, each wrestler received 2 points. A wrestler who accumulated 6 or more points was eliminated. Rounds continued until there were 3 or fewer uneliminated wrestlers. If only 1 wrestler remained, he received the gold medal. If 2 wrestlers remained, point totals were ignored and they faced each other for gold and silver (if they had already wrestled each other, that result was used). If 3 wrestlers remained, point totals were ignored and a round-robin was held among those 3 to determine medals (with previous head-to-head results, if any, counting for this round-robin).

== Results ==
=== Round 1 ===
Singh withdrew after his bout.

Bouts

Winner	Nation	Victory Type	Loser	Nation
Sin Sang-sik	South Korea	Tie	Burhan Bozkurt	Turkey
Maurice Mewis	Belgium	Decision	Ahmad Khoshoi	Iran
Armais Sayadov	Soviet Union	Decision	Vasilios Ganotis	Greece
Tsutomu Hanahara	Japan	Fall	Imre Alker	Hungary
Ignazio Fabra	Italy	Decision	Risto Björlin	Finland
Rolf Lacour	United Team of Germany	Decision	Fouad Ali	Egypt
Dumitru Pîrvulescu	Romania	Decision	Jørgen Jensen	Denmark
Dick Wilson	United States	Fall	César del Rio	Mexico
Angel Kerezov	Bulgaria	Tie	Malwa Singh	India

Points

Rank	Wrestler	Nation	R1
1	Tsutomu Hanahara	Japan	0
1	Dick Wilson	United States	0
3	Ignazio Fabra	Italy	1
3	Rolf Lacour	United Team of Germany	1
3	Maurice Mewis	Belgium	1
3	Dumitru Pîrvulescu	Romania	1
3	Armais Sayadov	Soviet Union	1
8	Burhan Bozkurt	Turkey	2
8	Angel Kerezov	Bulgaria	2
8	Sin Sang-sik	South Korea	2
11	Fouad Ali	Egypt	3
11	Risto Björlin	Finland	3
11	Vasilios Ganotis	Greece	3
11	Jørgen Jensen	Denmark	3
11	Ahmad Khoshoi	Iran	3
16	Imre Alker	Hungary	4
16	César del Rio	Mexico	4
18	Malwa Singh	India	2*

=== Round 2 ===
Six wrestlers were eliminated with their second loss each. Wilson had a bye to stay at 0 points, the only competitor to do so as Hanahara won by decision and received 1 point.

Bouts

Winner	Nation	Victory Type	Loser	Nation
Maurice Mewis	Belgium	Decision	Sin Sang-sik	South Korea
Burhan Bozkurt	Turkey	Decision	Ahmad Khoshoi	Iran
Vasilios Ganotis	Greece	Default	Imre Alker	Hungary
Tsutomu Hanahara	Japan	Decision	Armais Sayadov	Soviet Union
Rolf Lacour	United Team of Germany	Decision	Risto Björlin	Finland
Ignazio Fabra	Italy	Decision	Fouad Ali	Egypt
Angel Kerezov	Bulgaria	Decision	Jørgen Jensen	Denmark
Dumitru Pîrvulescu	Romania	Fall	César del Rio	Mexico
Dick Wilson	United States	Bye	N/A	N/A

Points

Rank	Wrestler	Nation	R1	R2	Total
1	Dick Wilson	United States	0	0	0
2	Tsutomu Hanahara	Japan	0	1	1
2	Dumitru Pîrvulescu	Romania	1	0	1
4	Ignazio Fabra	Italy	1	1	2
4	Rolf Lacour	United Team of Germany	1	1	2
4	Maurice Mewis	Belgium	1	1	2
7	Burhan Bozkurt	Turkey	2	1	3
7	Vasilios Ganotis	Greece	3	0	3
7	Angel Kerezov	Bulgaria	2	1	3
10	Armais Sayadov	Soviet Union	1	3	4
11	Sin Sang-sik	South Korea	2	3	5
12	Fouad Ali	Egypt	3	3	6
12	Risto Björlin	Finland	3	3	6
12	Jørgen Jensen	Denmark	3	3	6
12	Ahmad Khoshoi	Iran	3	3	6
16	Imre Alker	Hungary	4	4	8
16	César del Rio	Mexico	4	4	8

=== Round 3 ===
Ganotis and Sayadov each had their second loss and were eliminated. Bozkurt had his first loss, but with a tie and win by decision earlier, had enough points to eliminate him as well. Sin won in round 3, but the point from the win by decision was enough to eliminate him. Hanahara and Pîrvulescu took the lead with 2 points after Wilson's loss put him at 3 (along with three other wrestlers). Lacour also survived a loss, at 5 points.

Bouts

Winner	Nation	Victory Type	Loser	Nation
Maurice Mewis	Belgium	Decision	Burhan Bozkurt	Turkey
Tsutomu Hanahara	Japan	Decision	Vasilios Ganotis	Greece
Ignazio Fabra	Italy	Decision	Armais Sayadov	Soviet Union
Dumitru Pîrvulescu	Romania	Decision	Rolf Lacour	United Team of Germany
Sin Sang-sik	South Korea	Decision	Dick Wilson	United States
Angel Kerezov	Bulgaria	Bye	N/A	N/A

Points

Rank	Wrestler	Nation	R1	R2	R3	Total
1	Tsutomu Hanahara	Japan	0	1	1	2
1	Dumitru Pîrvulescu	Romania	1	0	1	2
3	Ignazio Fabra	Italy	1	1	1	3
3	Angel Kerezov	Bulgaria	2	1	0	3
3	Maurice Mewis	Belgium	1	1	1	3
3	Dick Wilson	United States	0	0	3	3
7	Rolf Lacour	United Team of Germany	1	1	3	5
8	Burhan Bozkurt	Turkey	2	1	3	6
8	Vasilios Ganotis	Greece	3	0	3	6
8	Sin Sang-sik	South Korea	2	3	1	6
11	Armais Sayadov	Soviet Union	1	3	3	7

=== Round 4 ===
Four of the seven wrestlers were eliminated in this round (all finishing with the same number of points and therefore tied for 4th place), with the three remaining advancing to the final round. Wilson, after a first round win and second round bye, had his second loss in a row. Fabra, Mewis, and Lacour all finished with 3–1 records, but 6 points because their wins had all been by decision.

Bouts

Winner	Nation	Victory Type	Loser	Nation
Angel Kerezov	Bulgaria	Decision	Dick Wilson	United States
Tsutomu Hanahara	Japan	Decision	Maurice Mewis	Belgium
Rolf Lacour	United Team of Germany	Decision	Ignazio Fabra	Italy
Dumitru Pîrvulescu	Romania	Bye	N/A	N/A

Points

Rank	Wrestler	Nation	R1	R2	R3	R4	Total
1	Dumitru Pîrvulescu	Romania	1	0	1	0	2
2	Tsutomu Hanahara	Japan	0	1	1	1	3
3	Angel Kerezov	Bulgaria	2	1	0	1	4
4	Ignazio Fabra	Italy	1	1	1	3	6
4	Maurice Mewis	Belgium	1	1	1	3	6
4	Dick Wilson	United States	0	0	3	3	6
4	Rolf Lacour	United Team of Germany	1	1	3	1	6

=== Final round ===
None of the medalists had faced each other yet, so the final round was a full round-robin. Kerezov defeated Pîrvulescu, as did Hanahara. This gave Pîrvulescu the bronze medal and set up a de facto gold medal match between Kerezov and Hanahara. The latter wrestler prevailed by decision.

Bouts

Winner	Nation	Victory Type	Loser	Nation
Angel Kerezov	Bulgaria	Decision	Dumitru Pîrvulescu	Romania
Tsutomu Hanahara	Japan	Fall	Dumitru Pîrvulescu	Romania
Tsutomu Hanahara	Japan	Decision	Angel Kerezov	Bulgaria

Points

Rank	Wrestler	Nation	Points
1st place, gold medalist(s)	Tsutomu Hanahara	Japan	1
2nd place, silver medalist(s)	Angel Kerezov	Bulgaria	4
3rd place, bronze medalist(s)	Dumitru Pîrvulescu	Romania	7
