= Yugoslavia at the 1967 Mediterranean Games =

- IOC code: YUG
- NOC: Yugoslav Olympic Committee

in Tunis
- Medals Ranked 2nd: Gold 15 Silver 16 Bronze 5 Total 36

Mediterranean Games appearances (overview)
- 1951; 1955; 1959; 1963; 1967; 1971; 1975; 1979; 1983; 1987; 1991

Other related appearances
- Bosnia and Herzegovina (1993–); Croatia (1993–); Slovenia (1993–); Serbia and Montenegro (1997–2005); Montenegro (2009–); Serbia (2009–); North Macedonia (2013–); Kosovo (2018–)

Yugoslavia competed at the 1967 Mediterranean Games held in Tunis, Tunisia.

== Medalists ==
Medal	Name	Sport	Event
Gold	Snežana Hrepevnik	Athletics	High Jump
Gold	Miljenko Rak	Athletics	Long Jump
Gold	Tomislav Šuker	Athletics	Shot Put
Gold	Miodrag Todosijević	Athletics	High Jump
Gold	Basketball team: Petar Skansi Krešimir Ćosić Vladimir Cvetković Aljoša Žorga Rato Tvrdić Zoran Maroević Kosta Grubor Damir Šolman Ljubodrag Simonović Nikola Plećaš Goran Brajković Momčilo Pazman	Basketball	Men's tournament
Gold	Zvonimir Vujin	Boxing	Lightweight
Gold	Miroslav Cerar	Gymnastics	Individual all-around
Gold	Miroslav Cerar	Gymnastics	Parallel bars
Gold	Miroslav Cerar	Gymnastics	Pommel horse
Gold	Handball team: Boris Kostić Zoran Živković Josip Milković Hrvoje Horvat Ivan Uremović Albin Vidović Branislav Pokrajac Petar Fajfrić Nebojša Popović Milorad Karalić Slobodan Koprivica Miroslav Klišanin	Handball	Men's tournament
Gold	Nenad Kuridža	Swimming	100m Butterfly
Gold	Volleyball team: Zoran Petrović Mate Piljić Milovan Simić Miloš Grbić Nikola Miković Mladen Kos Vladimir Janković Adolf Urnaut Ljubomir Stojić Ljubomir Bojić Siniša Bakarac Miodrag Gvozdenović	Volleyball	Men's tournament
Gold	Water polo team: Karlo Stipanić Ivo Trumbić Ozren Bonačić Mirko Sandić Zoran Janković Vinko Rosić Đorđe Perišić Ronald Lopatni Radovan Miškov Uroš Marović Zdravko Hebl	Water polo	Men's tournament
Gold	Stevan Horvat	Wrestling	Greco-Roman - 70kg
Gold	Branislav Simić	Wrestling	Greco-Roman - 87kg
Silver	Drago Žuntar	Athletics	5.000m
Silver	Marijan Gredelj	Athletics	Discus throw
Silver	Đurđa Fočić	Athletics	80m Hurdles
Silver	Đurđa Fočić	Athletics	High Jump
Silver	Đurđa Fočić	Athletics	Long Jump
Silver	Ljubinko Veselinović	Boxing	Light Welterweight
Silver	Miroslav Cerar, Milenko Kresnič, Janez Brodnik, Martin Šrot, Miloš Vratič, Avgust Kisel	Gymnastics	Men's team
Silver	Miroslav Cerar	Gymnastics	Floor
Silver	Miroslav Cerar	Gymnastics	Rings
Silver	Milenko Kresnič	Gymnastics	Vault
Silver	Janez Brodnik	Gymnastics	Horizontal bar
Silver	Sreten Damjanović	Wrestling	Greco-Roman - 63kg
Silver	Josip Čorak	Wrestling	Greco-Roman - 97kg
Silver	Boris Dimovski	Wrestling	Freestyle - 52kg
Silver	Boško Marinko	Wrestling	Freestyle - 63kg
Silver	Josip Čorak	Wrestling	Freestyle - 97kg
Bronze	Milija Jocović	Athletics	Shot put
Bronze	Drago Žuntar	Athletics	10.000m
Bronze	Polde Milek	Athletics	High jump
Bronze	Miroslav Cerar	Gymnastics	Vault
Bronze	Milan Nenadić	Wrestling	Freestyle - 87kg

== Medals by sport ==
Sport	Gold	Silver	Bronze	Total
Athletics	4	5	3	12
Gymnastics	3	5	1	9
Wrestling	2	5	1	8
Boxing	1	1	0	2
Basketball	1	0	0	1
Handball	1	0	0	1
Swimming	1	0	0	1
Volleyball	1	0	0	1
Water polo	1	0	0	1
Totals (9 entries)	15	16	5	36
