= Italy at the 1967 Mediterranean Games =

- IOC code: ITA
- NOC: Italian National Olympic Committee

in Tunis
- Medals Ranked 1st: Gold 35 Silver 26 Bronze 22 Total 83

Mediterranean Games appearances (overview)
- 1951; 1955; 1959; 1963; 1967; 1971; 1975; 1979; 1983; 1987; 1991; 1993; 1997; 2001; 2005; 2009; 2013; 2018; 2022; 2026

Italy competed at the 1967 Mediterranean Games in Tunis, Tunisia.

== Medals ==
=== Athletics ===
| Sport | Gold | Silver | Bronze | Total |
|---|---|---|---|---|
| Athletics | 14 | 6 | 6 | 26 |
| Totals (1 entries) | 14 | 6 | 6 | 26 |

==== Men ====
| Event | 1st place, gold medalist(s) | 2nd place, silver medalist(s) | 3rd place, bronze medalist(s) |
|---|---|---|---|
| 200 metres | Ito Giani | Livio Berruti | |
| 400 metres | Sergio Bello | | |
| 1500 metres | Renzo Finelli | | |
| Marathon | Antonio Ambu | | |
| 110 metres hurdles | Giovanni Cornacchia | Sergio Liani | |
| 400 metres hurdles | Alessandro Scatena | | |
| 20 km walk | Nicola De Vito | | |
| 50 km walk | Vittorio Visini | | |
| Discus throw | Silvano Siméon | | Gilberto Ferrini |
| Javelin throw | Franco Radman | | |
| 4×100 metres relay | Ito Giani; Ennio Preatoni; Pasquale Giannattasio; Carlo Laverda | | |
| 4×400 metres relay | Sergio Bello; Furio Fusi; Sergio Ottolina; Giacomo Puosi | | |
| 100 metres | | Pasquale Giannattasio | Ennio Preatoni |
| Pole vault | | Renato Dionisi | |
| Triple jump | | Giuseppe Gentile | |
| 5000 metres | | | Giuseppe Cindolo |
| | 12 | 5 | 3 |

==== Women ====
| Event | 1st place, gold medalist(s) | 2nd place, silver medalist(s) | 3rd place, bronze medalist(s) |
|---|---|---|---|
| 80 metres hurdles | Carla Panerai | | Magali Vettorazzo |
| Long jump | Maria Vittoria Trio | | |
| 100 metres | | Donata Govoni | Patrizia Seriau |
| High jump | | | Luciana Giamperlati |
| | 2 | 1 | 3 |

== See also ==
- Boxing at the 1967 Mediterranean Games
- Swimming at the 1967 Mediterranean Games
- Volleyball at the 1967 Mediterranean Games
