= 1980 European Wrestling Championships =

- Host city: Czechoslovakia, Prievidza
- Dates: 20 – 27 April 1980

Champions
- Freestyle: Soviet Union
- Greco-Roman: Soviet Union

The 1980 European Wrestling Championships was held from 20 to 27 April 1980 in Prievidza, Czechoslovakia.

== Medal table ==
Rank	Nation	Gold	Silver	Bronze	Total
1	Soviet Union	10	7	2	19
2	Bulgaria	7	4	4	15
3	Poland	1	1	4	6
4	Romania	1	1	2	4
5	West Germany	1	1	0	2
6	Sweden	0	3	0	3
7	East Germany	0	2	1	3
8	Finland	0	1	1	2
9	Hungary	0	0	2	2
10	Austria	0	0	1	1
10	Belgium	0	0	1	1
10	France	0	0	1	1
10	Yugoslavia	0	0	1	1
Totals (13 entries)		20	20	20	60

== Medal summary ==
=== Men's freestyle ===
Event	Gold	Silver	Bronze
48 kg	Rumen Yordanov; Bulgaria	Arshak Sanoyan; Soviet Union	Władysław Olejnik; Poland
52 kg	Nermedin Selimov; Bulgaria	Iragui Shugayev; Soviet Union	Władysław Stecyk; Poland
57 kg	Gurguen Bagdasarian; Soviet Union	Ivan Tsochev; Bulgaria	Aurel Neagu; Romania
62 kg	Magomedgasan Abushev; Soviet Union	Simeon Shterev Sr. Bulgaria	Zoltán Szalontai; Hungary
68 kg	Saypulla Absaidov; Soviet Union	Ivan Yankov; Bulgaria	Stanisław Chiliński; Poland
74 kg	Martin Knosp; West Germany	Reinhold Steingräber; East Germany	Gueorgui Makasarishvili; Soviet Union
82 kg	Ismail Abilov; Bulgaria	Oleg Kaloyev; Soviet Union	Günter Bussarello; Austria
90 kg	Sanasar Oganisyan; Soviet Union	Uwe Neupert; East Germany	Christophe Andanson; France
100 kg	Magomed Magomedov; Soviet Union	Slavcho Chervenkov; Bulgaria	Harald Büttner; East Germany
+100 kg	Petar Ivanov; Bulgaria	Salman Hashimikov; Soviet Union	Adam Sandurski; Poland

=== Men's Greco-Roman ===
Event	Gold	Silver	Bronze
48 kg	Roman Kierpacz; Poland	Zhaksylyk Ushkempirov; Soviet Union	Totio Andonov; Bulgaria
52 kg	Vakhtang Blagidze; Soviet Union	Rolf Krauß; West Germany	Mladen Mladenov; Bulgaria
57 kg	Vitaly Konstantinov; Soviet Union	Benni Ljungbeck; Sweden	Julien Mewis; Belgium
62 kg	Nelson Davidyan; Soviet Union	Ryszard Świerad; Poland	Ion Păun; Romania
68 kg	Ștefan Rusu; Romania	Anatoli Kravchenko; Soviet Union	Tapio Sipilä; Finland
74 kg	Nedko Nedev; Bulgaria	Mikko Huhtala; Finland	Viacheslav Mkrtychev; Soviet Union
82 kg	Gennady Korban; Soviet Union	Leif Andersson; Sweden	Pavel Pavlov; Bulgaria
90 kg	Igor Kanygin; Soviet Union	Frank Andersson; Sweden	Stoyan Ivanov; Bulgaria
100 kg	Georgi Raykov; Bulgaria	Vasile Andrei; Romania	József Farkas; Hungary
+100 kg	Nikola Dinev; Bulgaria	Yevgueni Artiujin; Soviet Union	Prvoslav Ilić; Yugoslavia
