= Wrestling at the 1964 Summer Olympics – Men's freestyle flyweight =

Wrestling at the Olympics

Men's freestyle flyweight at the Games of the XVIII Olympiad
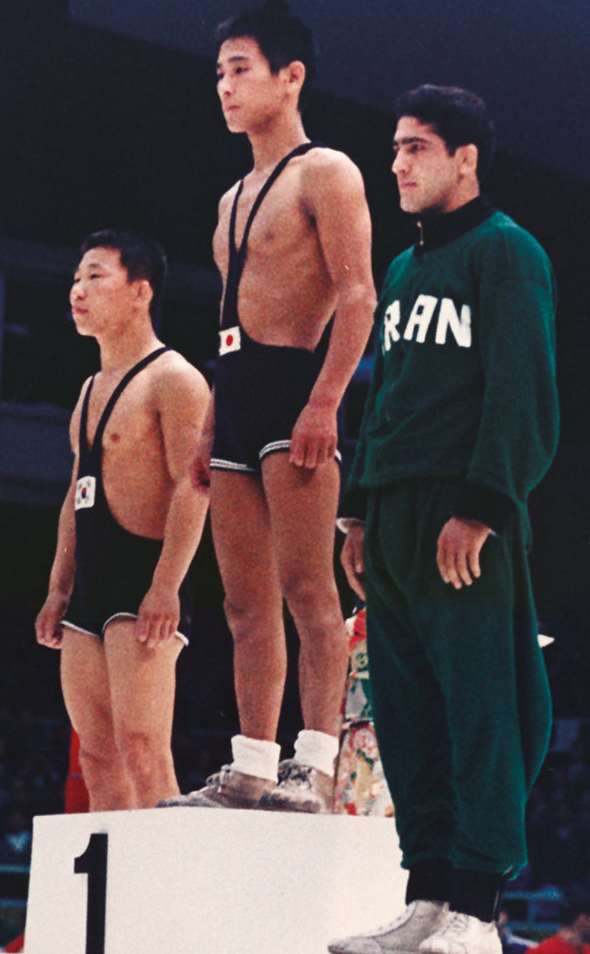
- The final podium.
- Venue: Komazawa Gymnasium
- Dates: 11–14 October 1964
- Competitors: 22 from 22 nations

Medalists
1st place, gold medalist(s)		Yoshikatsu Yoshida	Japan
2nd place, silver medalist(s)		Chang Chang-sun	South Korea
3rd place, bronze medalist(s)		Ali Akbar Heidari	Iran

The men's freestyle flyweight competition at the 1964 Summer Olympics in Tokyo took place from 11 to 14 October at the Komazawa Gymnasium. Nations were limited to one competitor. Flyweight was the lightest category, including wrestlers weighing up to 52 kilograms (114.6 lb).

== Competition format ==
This freestyle wrestling competition continued to use the "bad points" elimination system introduced at the 1928 Summer Olympics for Greco-Roman and at the 1932 Summer Olympics for freestyle wrestling, as adjusted at the 1960 Summer Olympics. Each bout awarded 4 points. If the victory was by fall, the winner received 0 and the loser 4. If the victory was by decision, the winner received 1 and the loser 3. If the bout was tied, each wrestler received 2 points. A wrestler who accumulated 6 or more points was eliminated. Rounds continued until there were 3 or fewer uneliminated wrestlers. If only 1 wrestler remained, he received the gold medal. If 2 wrestlers remained, point totals were ignored and they faced each other for gold and silver (if they had already wrestled each other, that result was used). If 3 wrestlers remained, point totals were ignored and a round-robin was held among those 3 to determine medals (with previous head-to-head results, if any, counting for this round-robin).

== Results ==
=== Round 1 ===
Bouts

Winner	Nation	Victory Type	Loser	Nation
Muhammad Niaz-Din	Pakistan	Tie	Ali Akbar Heidari	Iran
Athanasios Zafeiropoulos	Greece	Fall	Liang Soon Hin	Malaysia
Gray Simons	United States	Decision	Stoyko Malov	Bulgaria
Ali Aliyev	Soviet Union	Decision	Gheorghe Ţarălungă	Romania
Malwa Singh	India	Decision	Paul Neff	United Team of Germany
Chimedbazaryn Damdinsharav	Mongolia	Decision	Ernest Fernando	Ceylon
Cemal Yanılmaz	Turkey	Fall	Seán O'Connor	Ireland
Vincenzo Grassi	Italy	Decision	Faiz Mohammad Khakshar	Afghanistan
Yoshikatsu Yoshida	Japan	Fall	André Zoete	France
Eduardo Campbell	Panama	Fall	César del Rio	Mexico
Chang Chang-sun	South Korea	Fall	Max McAlary	Australia

Points

Rank	Wrestler	Nation	R1
1	Eduardo Campbell	Panama	0
1	Chang Chang-sun	South Korea	0
1	Cemal Yanılmaz	Turkey	0
1	Yoshikatsu Yoshida	Japan	0
1	Athanasios Zafeiropoulos	Greece	0
6	Ali Aliyev	Soviet Union	1
6	Chimedbazaryn Damdinsharav	Mongolia	1
6	Vincenzo Grassi	Italy	1
6	Gray Simons	United States	1
6	Malwa Singh	India	1
11	Ali Akbar Heidari	Iran	2
11	Muhammad Niaz-Din	Pakistan	2
13	Ernest Fernando	Ceylon	3
13	Faiz Mohammad Khakshar	Afghanistan	3
13	Stoyko Malov	Bulgaria	3
13	Paul Neff	United Team of Germany	3
13	Gheorghe Ţarălungă	Romania	3
18	César del Rio	Mexico	4
18	Liang Soon Hin	Malaysia	4
18	Max McAlary	Australia	4
18	Seán O'Connor	Ireland	4
18	André Zoete	France	4

=== Round 2 ===
Seven wrestlers had their second loss in round 2 and were eliminated, leaving 15 competitors to advance to round 3. Yoshida was the only wrestler left with 0 points.

Bouts

Winner	Nation	Victory Type	Loser	Nation
Muhammad Niaz-Din	Pakistan	Decision	Athanasios Zafeiropoulos	Greece
Ali Akbar Heidari	Iran	Fall	Liang Soon Hin	Malaysia
André Zoete	France	Fall	Max McAlary	Australia
Stoyko Malov	Bulgaria	Fall	Gheorghe Ţarălungă	Romania
Gray Simons	United States	Tie	Ali Aliyev	Soviet Union
Chang Chang-sun	South Korea	Decision	Eduardo Campbell	Panama
Malwa Singh	India	Walkover	Ernest Fernando	Sri Lanka
Chimedbazaryn Damdinsharav	Mongolia	Walkover	Paul Neff	United Team of Germany
Cemal Yanılmaz	Turkey	Decision	Vincenzo Grassi	Italy
Seán O'Connor	Ireland	Fall	Faiz Mohammad Khakshar	Afghanistan
Yoshikatsu Yoshida	Japan	Fall	César del Rio	Mexico

Points

Rank	Wrestler	Nation	R1	R2	Total
1	Yoshikatsu Yoshida	Japan	0	0	0
2	Chang Chang-sun	South Korea	0	1	1
2	Chimedbazaryn Damdinsharav	Mongolia	1	0	1
2	Malwa Singh	India	1	0	1
2	Cemal Yanılmaz	Turkey	0	1	1
6	Ali Akbar Heidari	Iran	2	0	2
7	Ali Aliyev	Soviet Union	1	2	3
7	Eduardo Campbell	Panama	0	3	3
7	Stoyko Malov	Bulgaria	3	0	3
7	Muhammad Niaz-Din	Pakistan	2	1	3
7	Gray Simons	United States	1	2	3
7	Athanasios Zafeiropoulos	Greece	0	3	3
13	Vincenzo Grassi	Italy	1	3	4
13	Seán O'Connor	Ireland	4	0	4
13	André Zoete	France	4	0	4
16	Ernest Fernando	Sri Lanka	3	4	7
16	Faiz Mohammad Khakshar	Afghanistan	3	4	7
16	Paul Neff	United Team of Germany	3	4	7
16	Gheorghe Ţarălungă	Romania	3	4	7
20	César del Rio	Mexico	4	4	8
20	Liang Soon Hin	Malaysia	4	4	8
20	Max McAlary	Australia	4	4	8

=== Round 3 ===
Four more wrestlers reached 6 or more points after taking a second loss in this round. Advancing to round 4 were 11 wrestlers, 7 of whom had 4 points and would be eliminated with a loss or tie. Chang and Yoshida each had only 1 point to lead the group.

Bouts

Winner	Nation	Victory Type	Loser	Nation
Muhammad Niaz-Din	Pakistan	Decision	Stoyko Malov	Bulgaria
Ali Akbar Heidari	Iran	Decision	Athanasios Zafeiropoulos	Greece
Gray Simons	United States	Decision	Malwa Singh	India
Ali Aliyev	Soviet Union	Decision	Chimedbazaryn Damdinsharav	Mongolia
Vincenzo Grassi	Italy	Decision	Seán O'Connor	Ireland
Yoshikatsu Yoshida	Japan	Decision	Cemal Yanılmaz	Turkey
André Zoete	France	Fall	Eduardo Campbell	Panama
Chang Chang-sun	South Korea	Bye	N/A	N/A

Points

Rank	Wrestler	Nation	R1	R2	R3	Total
1	Chang Chang-sun	South Korea	0	1	0	1
1	Yoshikatsu Yoshida	Japan	0	0	1	1
3	Ali Akbar Heidari	Iran	2	0	1	3
4	Ali Aliyev	Soviet Union	1	2	1	4
4	Chimedbazaryn Damdinsharav	Mongolia	1	0	3	4
4	Muhammad Niaz-Din	Pakistan	2	1	1	4
4	Gray Simons	United States	1	2	1	4
4	Malwa Singh	India	1	0	3	4
4	Cemal Yanılmaz	Turkey	0	1	3	4
4	André Zoete	France	4	0	0	4
11	Vincenzo Grassi	Italy	1	3	1	5
12	Stoyko Malov	Bulgaria	3	0	3	6
12	Athanasios Zafeiropoulos	Greece	0	3	3	6
14	Eduardo Campbell	Panama	0	3	4	7
14	Seán O'Connor	Ireland	4	0	3	7

=== Round 4 ===
Five wrestlers were eliminated: Chimedbazaryn, Singh, and Grassi each had two losses; Niaz-Din had only one and Simons had not lost at all, but their accumulation of points from draws and wins by decision was enough to put them at 6 or more. Yoshida regained sole possession of the lead, staying at 1 point while Chang received a second. Three wrestlers stayed at 4 points, while Heidari moved from 3 to 5 with his tie.

Bouts

Winner	Nation	Victory Type	Loser	Nation
Chang Chang-sun	South Korea	Decision	Muhammad Niaz-Din	Pakistan
Ali Akbar Heidari	Iran	Tie	Gray Simons	United States
Ali Aliyev	Soviet Union	Fall	Malwa Singh	India
Cemal Yanılmaz	Turkey	Fall	Chimedbazaryn Damdinsharav	Mongolia
Yoshikatsu Yoshida	Japan	Fall	Vincenzo Grassi	Italy
André Zoete	France	Bye	N/A	N/A

Points

Rank	Wrestler	Nation	R1	R2	R3	R4	Total
1	Yoshikatsu Yoshida	Japan	0	0	1	0	1
2	Chang Chang-sun	South Korea	0	1	0	1	2
3	Ali Aliyev	Soviet Union	1	2	1	0	4
3	Cemal Yanılmaz	Turkey	0	1	3	0	4
3	André Zoete	France	4	0	0	0	4
6	Ali Akbar Heidari	Iran	2	0	1	2	5
7	Gray Simons	United States	1	2	1	2	6
8	Muhammad Niaz-Din	Pakistan	2	1	1	3	7
9	Chimedbazaryn Damdinsharav	Mongolia	1	0	3	4	8
9	Malwa Singh	India	1	0	3	4	8
11	Vincenzo Grassi	Italy	1	3	1	4	9

=== Round 5 ===
All four wrestlers that started the round with 4 points lost by decision and were eliminated in a three-way tie for 4th place. Heidari, who started with 5 points and had not lost any bout, was also eliminated because his win by decision gave him 6 points. Yoshida and Chang were the last two wrestlers remaining; they advanced to a final bout.

Bouts

Winner	Nation	Victory Type	Loser	Nation
Chang Chang-sun	South Korea	Decision	André Zoete	France
Ali Akbar Heidari	Iran	Decision	Cemal Yanılmaz	Turkey
Yoshikatsu Yoshida	Japan	Decision	Ali Aliyev	Soviet Union

Points

Rank	Wrestler	Nation	R1	R2	R3	R4	R5	Total
1	Yoshikatsu Yoshida	Japan	0	0	1	0	1	2
2	Chang Chang-sun	South Korea	0	1	0	1	1	3
3rd place, bronze medalist(s)	Ali Akbar Heidari	Iran	2	0	1	2	1	6
4	Ali Aliyev	Soviet Union	1	2	1	0	3	7
4	Cemal Yanılmaz	Turkey	0	1	3	0	3	7
4	André Zoete	France	4	0	0	0	3	7

=== Final round ===
In a head-to-head final bout for the gold medal, Yoshida won by decision.

Bouts

Winner	Nation	Victory Type	Loser	Nation
Yoshikatsu Yoshida	Japan	Decision	Chang Chang-sun	South Korea

Points

Rank	Wrestler	Nation	Points
1st place, gold medalist(s)	Yoshikatsu Yoshida	Japan	1
2nd place, silver medalist(s)	Chang Chang-sun	South Korea	3
