= Athletics at the Mediterranean Games =

Athletics is one of the sports at the quadrennial Mediterranean Games competition. It has been one of the sports competed at the event since the inaugural edition in 1951.

== Editions ==
Games	Year	Host city	Host country	Main venue	Events			Best nation
Games	Year	Host city	Host country	Main venue	Men	Women	Mixed	Best nation
I	1951	Alexandria	Egypt	Stade Fouad 1er	23	—	—	France (FRA)
II	1955	Barcelona	Spain	Estadi Olímpic de Montjuïc	24	—	—	France (FRA)
III	1959	Beirut	Lebanon	Cité sportive Camille-Chamoun	23	—	—	France (FRA)
IV	1963	Naples	Italy	Stadio San Paolo	21	—	—	Italy (ITA)
V	1967	Tunis	Tunisia	Stade El Menzah	22	6	—	Italy (ITA)
VI	1971	İzmir	Turkey	Atatürk Stadium	24	8	—	Italy (ITA)
VII	1975	Algiers	Algeria	Stade 5 Juillet 1962	23	8	—	Italy (ITA)
VIII	1979	Split	Yugoslavia	Stadion Poljud	23	14	—	Italy (ITA)
IX	1983	Casablanca	Morocco	Stade Mohammed V	23	16	—	France (FRA)
X	1987	Latakia	Syria	Al-Assad Stadium	23	16	—	Italy (ITA)
XI	1991	Athens	Greece	Olympic Stadium	22	16	—	Italy (ITA)
XII	1993	Narbonne	France	Parc des Sports et de l'Amitié	20	16	—	France (FRA)
XIII	1997	Bari	Italy	Stadio San Nicola	23	20	—	Italy (ITA)
XIV	2001	Tunis	Tunisia	Stade 7 Novembre	23	23	—	Italy (ITA)
XV	2005	Almería	Spain	Estadio Mediterraneo	24	23	—	France (FRA)
XVI	2009	Pescara	Italy	Stadio Adriatico	21	19	—	Italy (ITA)
XVII	2013	Mersin	Turkey	Yanıt Athletics Complex	22	22	—	Italy (ITA)
XVIII	2018	Tarragona	Spain	Campclar Athletics Stadium	17	17	—	Morocco (MAR)
XIX	2022	Oran	Algeria	Miloud Hadefi Stadium	20	18	—	Turkey (TUR)
XX	2026	Taranto	Italy	Stadio Giuseppe Valente	21	21	2	Italy (ITA)

== Events ==
As of the most recent 2026 edition, the athletics program features 21 men's, 21 women's events and 2 mixed events. These include a total of 26 track events, 2 road events, and 16 field events.

=== Men's events ===
Event	51	55	59	63	67	71	75	79	83	87	91	93	97	01	05	09	13	18	22	26
Current program
100 m	X	X	X	X	X	X	X	X	X	X	X	X	X	X	X	X	X	X	X	X
200 m	X	X	X	X	X	X	X	X	X	X	X	X	X	X	X	X	X	X	X	X
400 m	X	X	X	X	X	X	X	X	X	X	X	X	X	X	X	X	X	X	X	X
800 m	X	X	X	X	X	X	X	X	X	X	X	X	X	X	X	X	X	X	X	X
1500 m	X	X	X	X	X	X	X	X	X	X	X	X	X	X	X	X	X	X	X	X
5000 m	X	X	X	X	X	X	X	X	X	X	X	X	X	X	X	X	X	X	X	X
10,000 m	X	X	X	X	X	X	X	X	X	X	X	X	X	X	X	X	X			X
110 m hurdles	X	X	X	X	X	X	X	X	X	X	X	X	X	X	X	X	X	X	X	X
400 m hurdles	X	X	X	X	X	X	X	X	X	X	X	X	X	X	X	X	X	X	X	X
3000 m steeplechase	X	X	X		X	X	X	X	X	X	X	X	X	X	X	X	X	X	X	X
4 × 100 m relay	X	X	X	X	X	X	X	X	X	X	X	X	X	X	X	X	X	X	X	X
4 × 400 m relay	X	X	X	X	X	X	X	X	X	X	X	X	X	X	X	X	X	X	X	X
Half marathon															X	X	X	X	X	X
High jump	X	X	X	X	X	X	X	X	X	X	X	X	X	X	X	X	X	X	X	X
Pole vault	X	X	X	X	X	X	X	X	X	X	X	X	X	X	X		X		X	X
Long jump	X	X	X	X	X	X	X	X	X	X	X	X	X	X	X	X	X	X	X	X
Triple jump	X	X	X	X	X	X	X	X	X	X	X	X	X	X	X	X	X		X	X
Shot put	X	X	X	X	X	X	X	X	X	X	X	X	X	X	X	X	X	X	X	X
Discus throw	X	X	X	X	X	X	X	X	X	X	X	X	X	X	X	X	X	X	X	X
Hammer throw	X	X	X	X		X	X	X	X	X	X		X	X	X	X	X		X	X
Javelin throw	X	X	X	X	X	X	X	X	X	X	X	X	X	X	X	X	X	X	X	X
Past events
Marathon	X	X	X	X	X	X	X	X	X	X	X	X	X	X						
10 km walk	X	X																		
20 km walk			X		X	X	X	X	X	X	X		X	X	X	X				
50 km walk		X		X	X	X														
Decathlon	X	X	X			X	X	X	X	X	X		X	X	X					
Events	23	24	23	21	22	24	23	23	23	23	23	20	23	23	20	21	21	17	20	21

=== Women's events ===
Event	67	71	75	79	83	87	91	93	97	01	05	09	13	18	22	26
Current program
100 m	X	X	X	X	X	X	X	X	X	X	X	X	X	X	X	X
200 m				X	X	X	X	X	X	X	X	X	X	X	X	X
400 m		X	X	X	X	X	X	X	X	X	X	X	X	X	X	X
800 m		X	X	X	X	X	X	X	X	X	X	X	X	X	X	X
1500 m		X	X	X	X	X	X	X	X	X	X	X	X	X	X	X
5000 m									X	X	X	X	X	X	X	X
10,000 m									X	X	X	X	X			X
100 m hurdles		X	X	X	X	X	X	X	X	X	X	X	X	X	X	X
400 m hurdles					X	X	X	X	X	X	X	X	X	X	X	X
3000 m steeplechase										X			X	X	X	X
4 x 100 m relay		X	X	X	X	X	X	X	X	X	X	X	X	X	X	X
4 x 400 m relay				X	X	X	X		X	X	X		X	X	X	X
Half marathon											X	X	X	X	X	X
High jump	X	X	X	X	X	X	X	X	X	X	X	X	X		X	X
Pole vault										X	X	X	X	X		X
Long jump	X			X	X	X	X	X	X	X	X	X	X	X	X	X
Triple jump									X	X	X	X	X	X	X	X
Shot put	X			X	X	X	X	X	X	X	X	X				X
Discus throw		X	X	X	X	X	X	X	X	X	X	X	X	X	X	X
Hammer throw										X	X	X	X	X	X	X
Javelin throw	X			X	X	X	X	X	X	X	X	X	X		X	X
Past events
80 m hurdles	X															
Pentathlon				X												
3000 m					X	X	X	X								
Heptathlon					X	X	X	X	X	X	X		X			
Marathon								X	X	X						
10 km walk									X							
20 km walk										X	X		X			
Events	6	8	8	14	16	16	16	16	20	23	22	19	22	17	18	21

=== Mixed events ===
Event	26
4 x 100 m relay	X
4 x 400 m relay	X
Events	2

== All-time medal table ==
Updated after the 2026 Mediterranean Games

Rank	Nation	Gold	Silver	Bronze	Total
1	Italy (ITA)	192	170	138	500
2	France (FRA)	155	130	106	391
3	Greece (GRE)	63	74	79	216
4	Morocco (MAR)	58	57	40	155
5	Yugoslavia (YUG)	46	50	48	144
6	Spain (ESP)	39	80	95	214
7	Algeria (ALG)	36	21	38	95
8	Turkey (TUR)	34	39	51	124
9	Tunisia (TUN)	19	23	26	68
10	Cyprus (CYP)	14	11	7	32
11	Slovenia (SLO)	12	14	15	41
12	Croatia (CRO)	11	9	13	33
13	Portugal (POR)	9	6	5	20
14	Egypt (EGY)	6	14	21	41
15	Serbia (SRB)	6	6	3	15
16	Syria (SYR)	3	2	2	7
17	Albania (ALB)	2	2	3	7
18	Montenegro (MNE)	2	0	2	4
19	Bosnia and Herzegovina (BIH)	1	1	6	8
20	Serbia and Montenegro (SCG)	1	1	2	4
21	Libya (LBA)	1	0	5	6
22	Malta (MLT)	0	1	0	1
Totals (22 entries)		710	711	705	2,126
