= Tamble =

Tamble is a given name and a surname. Notable people with these names include:

- Richard Tamble (born 1945), American wrestler
- Tamble Monteiro (born 2000), Bissau-Guinean footballer
