= Jorge González (Spanish runner) =

Spanish middle-distance runner

Personal information
- Full name: Jorge González Amo
- Nationality: Spanish
- Born: 27 January 1945 (age 81) Madrid, Spain
- Height: 182 cm (6 ft 0 in)
- Weight: 66 kg (146 lb)

Sport
- Sport: Middle-distance running
- Event: 1500 metres
Medal record
Representing Spain
Mediterranean Games
Bronze medal – third place	1967 Tunis	1500m

Jorge González Amo (born 27 January 1945) is a Spanish middle-distance runner. He competed in the men's 1500 metres at the 1968 Summer Olympics.
