= Rogelio Rivas =

Spanish sprinter (1944–2025)

Personal information
- Nationality: Spanish
- Born: 7 August 1944 Vigo, Pontevedra, Spain
- Died: 26 April 2025 (aged 80) Vigo, Pontevedra, Spain

Sport
- Sport: Sprinting
- Event: 100 metres
Medal record
Representing Spain
Mediterranean Games
Silver medal – second place	1967 Tunis	400m
Silver medal – second place	1967 Tunis	4x400m relay

Rogelio Rivas Abal (7 August 1944 – 26 April 2025) was a Spanish sprinter. He competed in the men's 100 metres at the 1964 Summer Olympics.
