= Panagiotis Khatzistathis =

Greek long jumper

Personal information
- Nationality: Greek
- Born: 2 May 1952 (age 74) Akhna, Cyprus

Sport
- Sport: Athletics
- Event: Long jump
Medal record
Representing Greece
Mediterranean Games
Silver medal – second place	1967 Tunis	Long jump
Bronze medal – third place	1975 Algiers	Long jump

Panagiotis Khatzistathis (born 2 May 1952) is a Greek athlete. He competed in the men's long jump at the 1976 Summer Olympics.
