= Shūichi =

- Gender: Male

Origin
- Origin: Japanese
- Meaning: Different meanings depending on the kanji used

Shūichi, Shuichi or Shuuichi is a masculine Japanese given name. Notable people with the name include:

- Shuichi Abe (阿部 守一; born 1960), Japanese politician
- Shuichi Akai (footballer) (赤井 秀一; born 1981), Japanese footballer
- Shuichi Ikeda (池田 秀一; born 1949), Japanese voice actor
- Shuichi Ishiguro (石黒 修一; born 1945), Japanese sport wrestler
- Shuichi Mase (間瀬 秀一; born 1973), Japanese footballer and manager
- Shuichi Morita (森田 修一; born 1965), Japanese long-distance runner
- Shuichi Shigeno (しげの 秀一; born 1958), author of Initial D
- Shuichi Yoneshige (米重 修一; born 1961), Japanese long-distance runner
- Shuichi Yoshida (吉田 修一; born 1968), Japanese writer

== Fictional characters ==
- Shuichi Saihara (最原 終一), the main character in the visual novel Danganronpa V3: Killing Harmony
- Shuichi Shindou (新堂 愁一), the main character of the manga and anime series Gravitation
- Shuichi Saito (斎藤 秀一), a character in the manga series Uzumaki
- Shuichi Nakatsu (中津 秀一), a character in the manga series Hana-Kimi
- Shuichi Nitori (二鳥 修一), the main character of the manga and anime series Wandering Son
- Shuichi Akai (赤井 秀一), a character in the manga series Case Closed / Detective Conan
- Shuichi Iguchi (井口修一), better known as Spinner, is a major antagonist of the manga and anime series My Hero Academia
