= Athletics at the 1965 Summer Universiade – Women's pentathlon =

The women's pentathlon event at the 1965 Summer Universiade was held at the People's Stadium in Budapest on 28 August 1965. It was the first time that combined events were held for women at the Universiade.

== Results ==
Rank	Athlete	Nationality	80m H	SP	HJ	LJ	200m	Points	Notes
1st place, gold medalist(s)	Tatyana Shchelkanova	Soviet Union	11.1	12.18	1.56	6.30	24.8	4802	
2nd place, silver medalist(s)	Annamária Kovács	Hungary				5.86	25.0	4606	
3rd place, bronze medalist(s)	Yelena Kolnich	Soviet Union	11.2	10.96	1.50	5.92	25.6	4479	
4	Sue Mills	Great Britain				5.38	26.2	4367	
5	Elisabeth Ermatinger	Switzerland				5.55	25.8	4258	
6	Maria Pandele	Romania				5.70		4254	
7	Angelika Müller	West Germany						4180	
8	Alena Schusterová	Czechoslovakia						4098	
9	Ann-Kathrin Heine	West Germany						3982	
10	Pamela Holden	Great Britain					26.2	3957	
11	Barbara Sowa	Poland						3941	
12	Beya Bouabdallah	Tunisia						3115	
	Liesel Sykora	Austria						DNF	
