= Sayadov =

Sayadov (Russian: Саядов) is an Azerbaijani masculine surname, its feminine counterpart is Sayadova. Notable people with the surname include:

- Armais Sayadov (born 1937), Azerbaijani wrestler
- Georgy Sayadov (born 1931), Azerbaijani wrestler
