= De Zoete =

de Zoete is a surname. Notable people with the name include:

- Beryl de Zoete, English ballet dancer, orientalist, dance critic, and dance researcher
- Herman de Zoete, English cricketer
- Willem de Zoete, Dutch Admiral of the 17th century

== Other ==
- Barclays de Zoete Wedd, investment bank
- André Zoete, French wrestler

== See also ==
- Zoe (name)
