= Ioannis Kousoulas =

Greek high jumper

Personal information
- Nationality: Greek
- Born: 5 January 1950 (age 76) Athens, Greece
- Height: 184 cm (6 ft 0 in)
- Weight: 74 kg (163 lb)

Sport
- Sport: Athletics
- Event: High jump
- Club: AO Filotheis
Medal record
Representing Greece
Mediterranean Games
Silver medal – second place	1967 Tunis	High jump
Silver medal – second place	1971 Izmir	High jump

Ioannis Kousoulas (born 5 January 1950) is a Greek athlete. He competed in the men's high jump at the 1968 Summer Olympics and the 1972 Summer Olympics.

Kousoulas finished second behind Eldridge Lansdell in the high jump event at the British 1967 AAA Championships.
