= Chang Chang-sun =

South Korean freestyle wrestler (1942–2026)

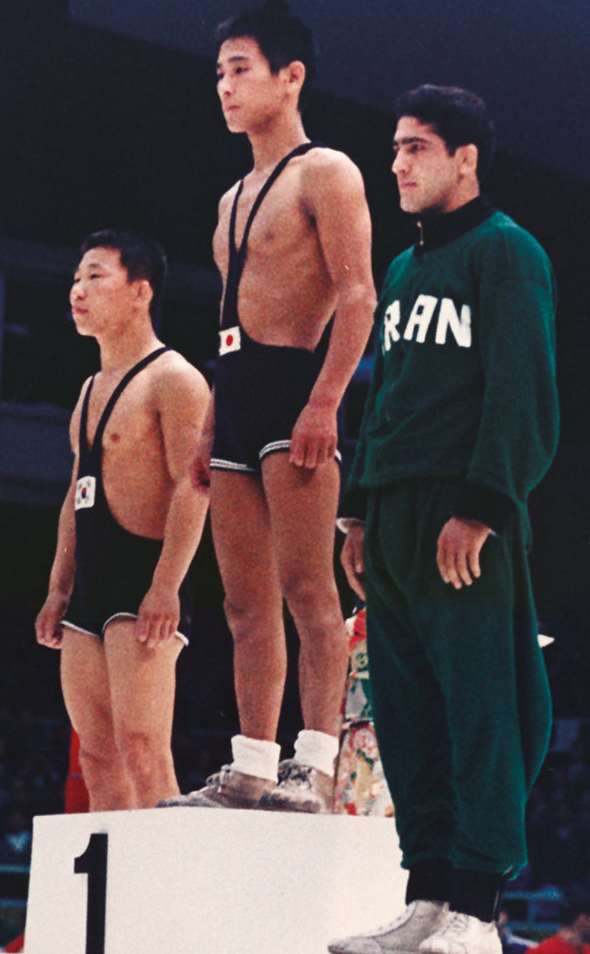
- Chang (left) at the 1964 Olympics

Personal information
- Born: June 12, 1942 Incheon, Korea, Empire of Japan
- Died: July 20, 2026 (aged 84)
- Height: 1.58 m (5 ft 2 in)
- Weight: 56 kg (123 lb)

Sport
- Sport: Freestyle wrestling
Medal record
Representing South Korea
Olympic Games
Silver medal – second place	1964 Tokyo	Flyweight
World Championships
Gold medal – first place	1966 Toledo	52 kg

Korean name
- Hangul: 장창선
- Hanja: 張昌宣
- RR: Jang Changseon
- MR: Chang Ch'angsŏn

Chang Chang-sun (or Jang Chang-seon; Korean: 장창선; Hanja: 張昌宣; June 12, 1942 – July 20, 2026) was a South Korean freestyle wrestler. He won a silver medal at the 1964 Summer Olympics and a world title in 1966. Chang died on July 20, 2026, at the age of 84.
