= Fouad Ali =

Egyptian wrestler

Personal information
- Nationality: Egyptian
- Born: 6 March 1936 (age 90) Cairo, Egypt

Sport
- Sport: Wrestling

Fouad Ali (born 6 March 1936) is an Egyptian wrestler. He competed in the men's Greco-Roman flyweight at the 1964 Summer Olympics.
