= Dumitru Pârvulescu =

Romanian Greco-Roman wrestler

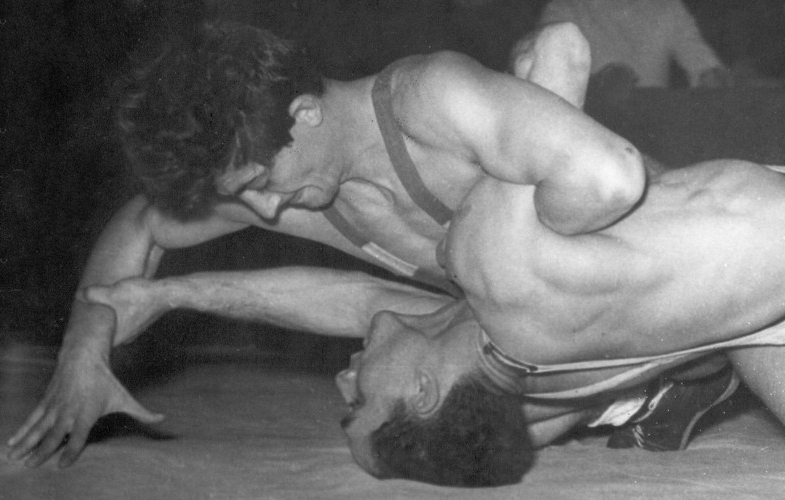
- Pârvulescu (top) at the 1960 Olympics

Personal information
- Born: 14 June 1933 Lugoj, Romania
- Died: 9 April 2007 (aged 73) Bucharest, Romania
- Height: 166 cm (5 ft 5 in)

Sport
- Sport: Greco-Roman wrestling
- Club: Vulturii; Steaua Bucharest
Medal record
Men's Greco-Roman wrestling
Representing Romania
Olympic Games
| Gold medal – first place | 1960 Rome | 52 kg |
| Bronze medal – third place | 1964 Tokyo | 52 kg |
World Championships
| Silver medal – second place | 1961 Yokohama | 52 kg |

Dumitru Pârvulescu (or, in older spelling, Pîrvulescu; 14 June 1933 – 9 April 2007) was a flyweight Greco-Roman wrestler from Romania. He competed at the 1952, 1956, 1960 and 1964 Olympics and won a gold medal in 1960, placing third in 1964 and fourth in 1956. At the world championships he won a silver medal in 1961 and finished fourth-fifth in 1953 and 1958.

== Sporting career ==
Pârvulescu took up wrestling at a very young age, with the Vulturii club in Lugoj. During his career he also represented Știința (Bucharest), Steagul Roșu (Braşov), and for the most part Steaua Bucharest. He debuted internationally in East Berlin in 1951, where he finished second. His Olympic debut in 1952 was less successful (2 defeats, 9th place). He narrowly missed the podium in the world Championship in Naples in 1953, losing only to the world champion Ahmet Bilek; he also finished fourth at the 1956 Olympics. At the 1960 Olympics, Pârvulescu won the final against Ignazio Fabra in a close decision. Pârvulescu went on to win a silver at the 1961 World Championships and a bronze at the 1964 Olympics. Losing to Gheorghe Berceanu in the Romanian championship persuaded him to retire from the mat and become a coach.

== Coaching career ==
Dumitru Pârvulescu coached for Steaua Bucharest and subsequently for L.C. Vulcan Bucharest. In addition, he was often commissioned by the Romanian wrestling Federation to select talented youngsters from various parts of the country. Pârvulescu was credited with coaching World champion and Olympic silver medalist Constantin Alexandru and with discovering a young talent who would become 1984 Olympic champion in the 100 kg category Vasile Andrei. He was also a mentor and confidant of World and Olympic 48 kg champion Gheorghe Berceanu.

In 2000, Pârvulescu received the National “Faithful Service” Order, the highest civilian distinction in Romania.
