= Jussi Vesterinen =

Finnish wrestler

Personal information
- Nationality: Finnish
- Born: 9 May 1949 (age 77) Viitasaari, Finland

Sport
- Sport: Wrestling

Jussi Vesterinen (born 9 May 1949) is a Finnish wrestler. He competed in the men's Greco-Roman 52 kg at the 1968 Summer Olympics.
