= Abdel Fattah Sayed Ibrahim =

Egyptian wrestler

Personal information
- Nationality: Egyptian
- Born: 3 February 1947 (age 79)

Sport
- Sport: Wrestling

Abdel Fattah Sayed Ibrahim (born 3 February 1947) is an Egyptian former wrestler. He competed in the men's Greco-Roman 52 kg at the 1972 Summer Olympics.
