= Stoyko Malov =

Bulgarian wrestler

Personal information
- Native name: Стойко Георгиев Малов
- Nationality: Bulgarian
- Born: 6 June 1943 (age 83)
- Height: 161 cm (5 ft 3 in)

Sport
- Sport: Wrestling

Achievements and titles
- World finals: Bronze
Medal record
World Wrestling Championships
Bronze medal – third place	1963 Sofia	Flyweight

Stoyko Georgiev Malov (born 6 June 1943) is a Bulgarian wrestler. He competed in the men's freestyle flyweight at the 1964 Summer Olympics.
