= Cemal Yanılmaz =

Turkish wrestler (1934–2018)

Personal information
- Nationality: Turkish
- Born: 2 January 1934 Samsun, Turkey
- Died: 6 June 2018 (aged 84) Samsun, Turkey

Sport
- Sport: Wrestling
Medal record
World Wrestling Championships
Gold medal – first place	1963 Sofia	Flyweight
Bronze medal – third place	1961 Yokohama	Flyweight

Cemal Yanılmaz (2 January 1934 – 6 June 2018) was a Turkish wrestler. He competed in the men's freestyle flyweight at the 1964 Summer Olympics.
