= Czesław Stanjek =

Polish wrestler

Personal information
- Nationality: Polish
- Born: 29 November 1952 (age 73) Ruda Śląska, Poland

Sport
- Sport: Wrestling

Czesław Stanjek (born 29 November 1952) is a Polish wrestler. He competed in the men's Greco-Roman 52 kg at the 1976 Summer Olympics.
