= Burhan Bozkurt =

Turkish wrestler

Personal information
- Nationality: Turkish
- Born: 20 August 1934
- Died: 1 March 2013 (aged 78)

Sport
- Sport: Wrestling

Burhan Bozkurt (20 August 1934 – 1 March 2013) was a Turkish wrestler. He competed in the men's Greco-Roman flyweight at the 1964 Summer Olympics.
