= Giuseppe Bognanni =

Italian wrestler (born 1947)

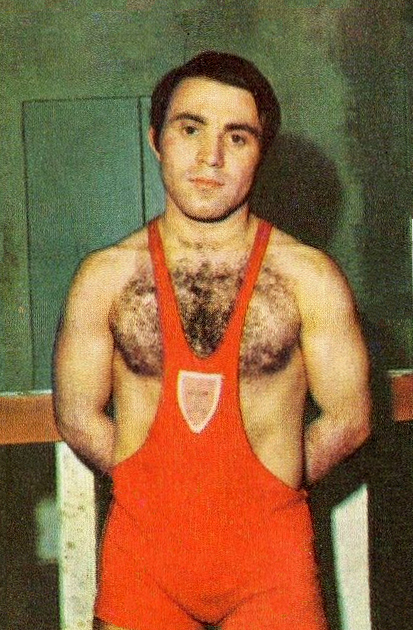

Personal information
- Born: 18 July 1947 (age 78) Riesi, Caltanissetta, Italy
- Height: 1.57 m (5 ft 2 in)
- Weight: 52 kg (115 lb)

Sport
- Sport: Greco-Roman wrestling
- Club: G. S. Italsider, Genova
Medal record
Representing Italy
Olympic Games
Bronze medal – third place	1972 Munich	Flyweight

Giuseppe Bognanni (born 18 July 1947) is a retired Italian flyweight wrestler who won a bronze medal at the 1972 Summer Olympics in Greco-Roman wrestling. At the European championships he finished third in 1969 and fourth in 1972 in Greco-Roman wrestling, and sixth in 1974 in freestyle wrestling.
