= Carla Panerai =

Italian sprinter

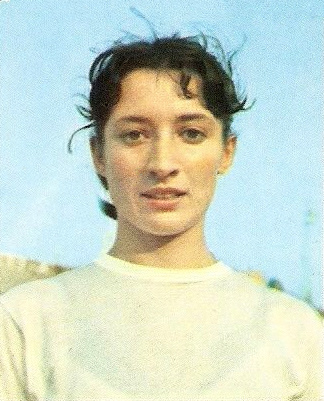
- Panerai in 1968

Personal information
- Born: 4 July 1947 (age 79) Florence, Italy
- Height: 1.66 m (5 ft 5 in)
- Weight: 57 kg (126 lb)

Sport
- Sport: Athletics
- Event: 80 m hurdles
- Club: CUS Firenze

Achievements and titles
- Personal best: 10.7 s (1968)
Medal record
Representing Italy
Mediterranean Games
Gold medal – first place	1967 Tunis	80 m hurdles

Carla Panerai (born 4 July 1947) is an Italian retired sprinter who competed at the 1968 Summer Olympics.

== Biography ==
Panerai won the gold medal in the 80 metres hurdles at the 1967 Mediterranean Games.

Panerai finished third behind Pat Pryce in the 80 metres hurdles event at the British 1968 WAAA Championships.

Later that year at the 1968 Olympic Games in Mexico City, she represented Italy in the women's 80 metres hurdles but failed to reach the final.
