= Yoshikatsu Yoshida =

Japanese wrestler (born 1941)

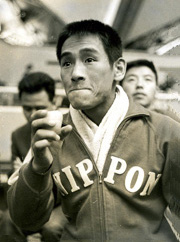
- Yoshikatsu Yoshida at the 1964 Olympics

Personal information
- Born: October 30, 1941 (age 84) Asahikawa, Hokkaido, Japan
- Height: 1.61 m (5 ft 3 in)
- Weight: 52 kg (115 lb)

Sport
- Sport: Freestyle wrestling
Medal record
Men's freestyle wrestling
Representing Japan
Olympic Games
Gold medal – first place	1964 Tokyo	52 kg

Yoshikatsu Yoshida (吉田 義勝, Yoshida Yoshikatsu; born October 30, 1941) is a retired Japanese freestyle wrestler. He won gold medals in the 52 kg category at the 1964 Summer Olympics.

Born in Hokkaido, Yoshida graduated from the Nihon University in Tokyo. After retiring from wrestling he left sport and worked for Meiji Dairies, eventually joining its board of directors.

Yoshikatsu Yoshida (吉田義勝) is often confused with Eikatsu Yoshida (吉田栄勝), a former national champion, and wrestling coach.
