= Ahmad Khoshouei =

Iranian wrestler

Personal information
- Nationality: Iranian
- Born: 2 March 1939 (age 87)

Sport
- Sport: Wrestling

Ahmad Khoshouei (Persian: احمد خشوعی; born 2 March 1939) is an Iranian wrestler. He competed in the men's Greco-Roman flyweight at the 1964 Summer Olympics.
