= Ahmed Chahrour =

Syrian wrestler

Personal information
- Native name: أحمشحرور وحود
- Nationality: Syria
- Height: 175 cm (5 ft 9 in)

Sport
- Country: Syria
- Sport: Amateur wrestling
- Weight class: 52 kg
- Event: Greco-Roman
Medal record
Men's Greco-Roman wrestling
Representing Syria
Mediterranean Games
Bronze medal – third place	1963 Naples	52 kg

Ahmed Chahrour is a Syrian wrestler. He competed in the men's Greco-Roman 52 kg at the 1968 Summer Olympics.
