= Angel Kerezov =

Bulgarian Greco-Roman wrestler (1939–2002)

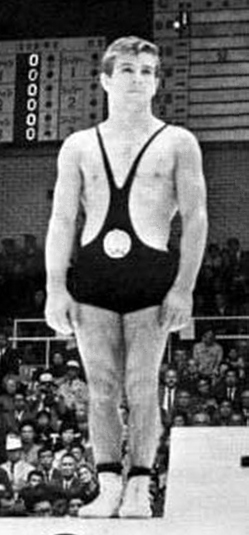
- Kerezov at the 1964 Olympics

Personal information
- Born: 24 July 1939 Priseltsi, Bulgaria
- Died: 2002 (aged 62–63)
- Height: 152 cm (5 ft 0 in)

Sport
- Sport: Greco-Roman wrestling
Medal record
Representing Bulgaria
Olympic Games
Silver medal – second place	1964 Tokyo	52 kg
World Championships
Gold medal – first place	1966 Toledo	52 kg
Bronze medal – third place	1965 Tampere	52 kg

Angel Stoyanov Kerezov (Bulgarian: Ангел Стоянов Керезов, 24 July 1939 – 2002) was a flyweight Greco-Roman wrestler from Bulgaria. He won a silver medal at the 1964 Olympics and a world title in 1966, placing third in 1965 and fourth in 1963.

Kerezov died in 2002.
