= Vladimir Bakulin =

Kazakhstani wrestler (1939–2012)

Medal record

Men's Greco-Roman wrestling

Representing the Soviet Union

Olympic Games
Silver medal – second place	1968 Mexico City	flyweight

World Championships
Gold medal – first place	1967 Bucharest	flyweight

Vladimir Bakulin (3 September 1939 – 10 December 2012) was a Kazakhstani wrestler who competed in the 1968 Summer Olympics.
