= Trond Martiniussen =

Norwegian wrestler

Personal information
- Nationality: Norwegian
- Born: 5 January 1945 (age 81) Fredrikstad, Norway

Sport
- Sport: Wrestling

Trond Martiniussen (born 5 January 1945) is a Norwegian wrestler. He competed in the men's Greco-Roman 52 kg at the 1972 Summer Olympics.
