= Ali Akbar Heidari =

Iranian wrestler (born 1941)

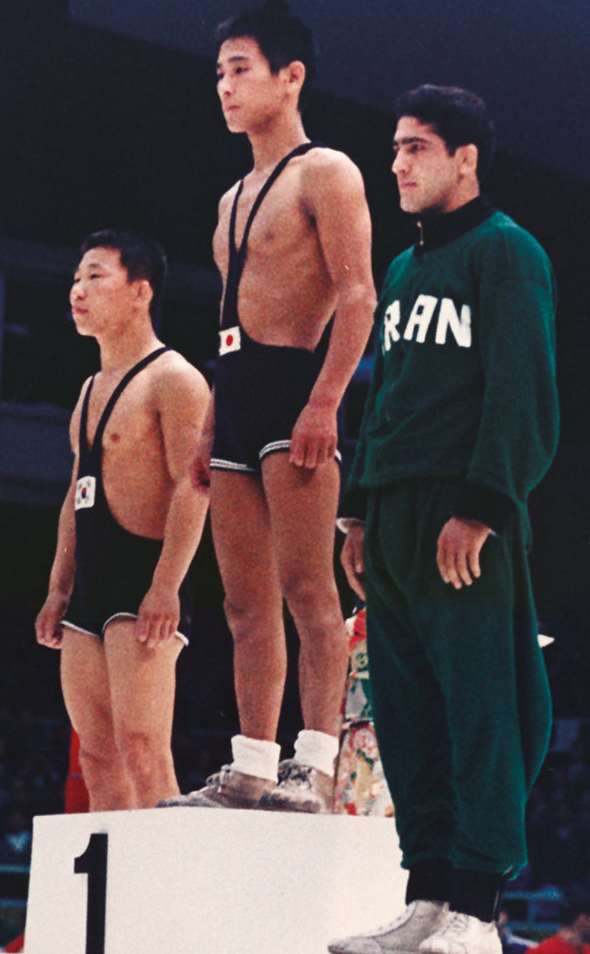
- Heidari (right) at the 1964 Olympics

Personal information
- Born: 14 July 1941 (age 85) Tehran, Iran
- Height: 165 cm (5 ft 5 in)

Sport
- Sport: Freestyle wrestling
Medal record
Representing Iran
Olympic Games
Bronze medal – third place	1964 Tokyo	52 kg
Asian Games
Silver medal – second place	1966 Bangkok	52 kg

Seyed Ali Akbar Heidari (Persian: سید علی اكبر حیدری, born 14 July 1941) is a retired Iranian flyweight freestyle wrestler. He won a bronze medal at the 1964 Olympics, a silver medal at the 1966 Asian Games, and placed fourth at the 1965 World Championships.
