= Alex Børger =

Danish wrestler (1939–2008)

Personal information
- Nationality: Danish
- Born: 15 July 1939 Kastrup, Denmark
- Died: 22 September 2008 (aged 69)

Sport
- Sport: Wrestling

Alex Børger (15 July 1939 – 22 September 2008) was a Danish wrestler. He competed in the men's Greco-Roman 52 kg at the 1968 Summer Olympics.
