= Koichiro Hirayama =

Japanese wrestler (born 1946)

Medal record

Men's Greco-Roman wrestling

Representing Japan

Olympic Games
Silver medal – second place	1972 Munich	52 kg
Bronze medal – third place	1976 Montreal	52 kg

Koichiro Hirayama (平山 紘一郎, Hirayama Kōichirō; born 9 September 1946) is a Japanese former wrestler who competed in the 1972 Summer Olympics and in the 1976 Summer Olympics.
