= Mehdi Houryar =

Iranian wrestler

Personal information
- Nationality: Iranian
- Born: 9 January 1945 (age 81)

Sport
- Sport: Wrestling

Mehdi Houryar (Persian: مهدی هوریار; born 9 January 1945) is an Iranian wrestler. He competed in the men's Greco-Roman 52 kg at the 1972 Summer Olympics.
