= Gheorghe Țarălungă =

Romanian wrestler

Personal information
- Nationality: Romanian
- Born: 11 February 1941 (age 85)

Sport
- Sport: Wrestling

Gheorghe Țarălungă (born 11 February 1941) is a Romanian wrestler. He competed in the men's freestyle flyweight at the 1964 Summer Olympics.
