= Đurđa Fočić =

Croatian athlete

Personal information
- Nationality: Croatian
- Born: 28 July 1948 (age 77) Zagreb, Yugoslavia

Sport
- Sport: Athletics
- Event: Pentathlon
Medal record
Representing Yugoslavia
Mediterranean Games
Silver medal – second place	1967 Tunis	80m hurdles
Silver medal – second place	1967 Tunis	High jump
Silver medal – second place	1967 Tunis	Long jump
Silver medal – second place	1975 Algiers	4x100m relay
Bronze medal – third place	1971 Izmir	100m hurdles
Bronze medal – third place	1971 Izmir	4x100m relay
Bronze medal – third place	1975 Algiers	100m hurdles
Bronze medal – third place	1975 Algiers	High jump
Summer Universiade
Silver medal – second place	1975 Rome	Pentathlon

Đurđa Fočić (born 28 July 1948) is a Croatian athlete. She competed in the women's pentathlon at the 1968, 1972 and the 1976 Summer Olympics, representing Yugoslavia.
