= Baek Seung-hyun =

South Korean wrestler (born 1948)

Personal information
- Nationality: South Korean
- Born: 7 August 1948 (age 77)
- Height: 160 cm (5 ft 3 in)
- Weight: 52 kg (115 lb)

Sport
- Sport: Wrestling
Medal record
Representing South Korea
Men's Wrestling
Asian Games
Silver medal – second place	1974 Tehran	Greco-Roman flyweight
World Wrestling Championships
Bronze medal – third place	1975 Minsk	Greco-Roman 52 kg

Korean name
- Hangul: 백승현
- RR: Baek Seunghyeon
- MR: Paek Sŭnghyŏn

Baek Seung-hyun (Korean: 백승현; born 7 August 1948) is a South Korean former wrestler.

Baek won the silver medal in the Greco-Roman flyweight event at the 1974 Asian Games in Tehran. He also finished third in the 52 kg Greco-Roman event at the 1975 World Wrestling Championships in Minsk.

He also competed at other international competitions, at the 1969 World Wrestling Championships (5th), 1970 World Wrestling Championships (4th) and in the men's Greco-Roman 52 kg event at the 1976 Summer Olympics.
