= Bilal Tabur =

Turkish wrestler

Personal information
- Nationality: Turkish
- Born: 1 January 1949 (age 77)

Sport
- Sport: Wrestling

Bilal Tabur (born 1 January 1949) is a Turkish wrestler. He competed in the men's Greco-Roman 52 kg at the 1976 Summer Olympics.
