= Liang Soon Hin =

Malaysian wrestler

Personal information
- Nationality: Malaysian
- Born: 13 February 1944 (age 82)

Sport
- Sport: Wrestling

Liang Soon Hin (born 13 February 1944) is a Malaysian wrestler. He competed in the men's freestyle flyweight at the 1964 Summer Olympics.
