= Max McAlary =

Australian wrestler (1929–2025)

Personal information
- Nationality: Australian
- Born: 20 December 1929 Wollongong, New South Wales, Australia
- Died: 1 July 2025 (aged 95) Towradgi, New South Wales, Australia

Sport
- Sport: Wrestling

John Maxwell McAlary OAM (20 December 1929 – 1 July 2025) was an Australian wrestler. He competed in the men's freestyle flyweight at the 1964 Summer Olympics. McAlary was awarded the Medal of the Order of Australia at the 2025 King's Birthday Honours for service to the sport of wrestling. He died on 1 July 2025, at the age of 95.
