= André Gaudinot =

French wrestler

Personal information
- Nationality: French
- Born: 27 August 1947 (age 77); Lyon, France

Sport
- Sport: Wrestling

André Gaudinot (born 27 August 1947) is a French wrestler. He competed in two events at the 1968 Summer Olympics.
