= Miljenko Rak =

Croatian former long-jumper and fitness trainer

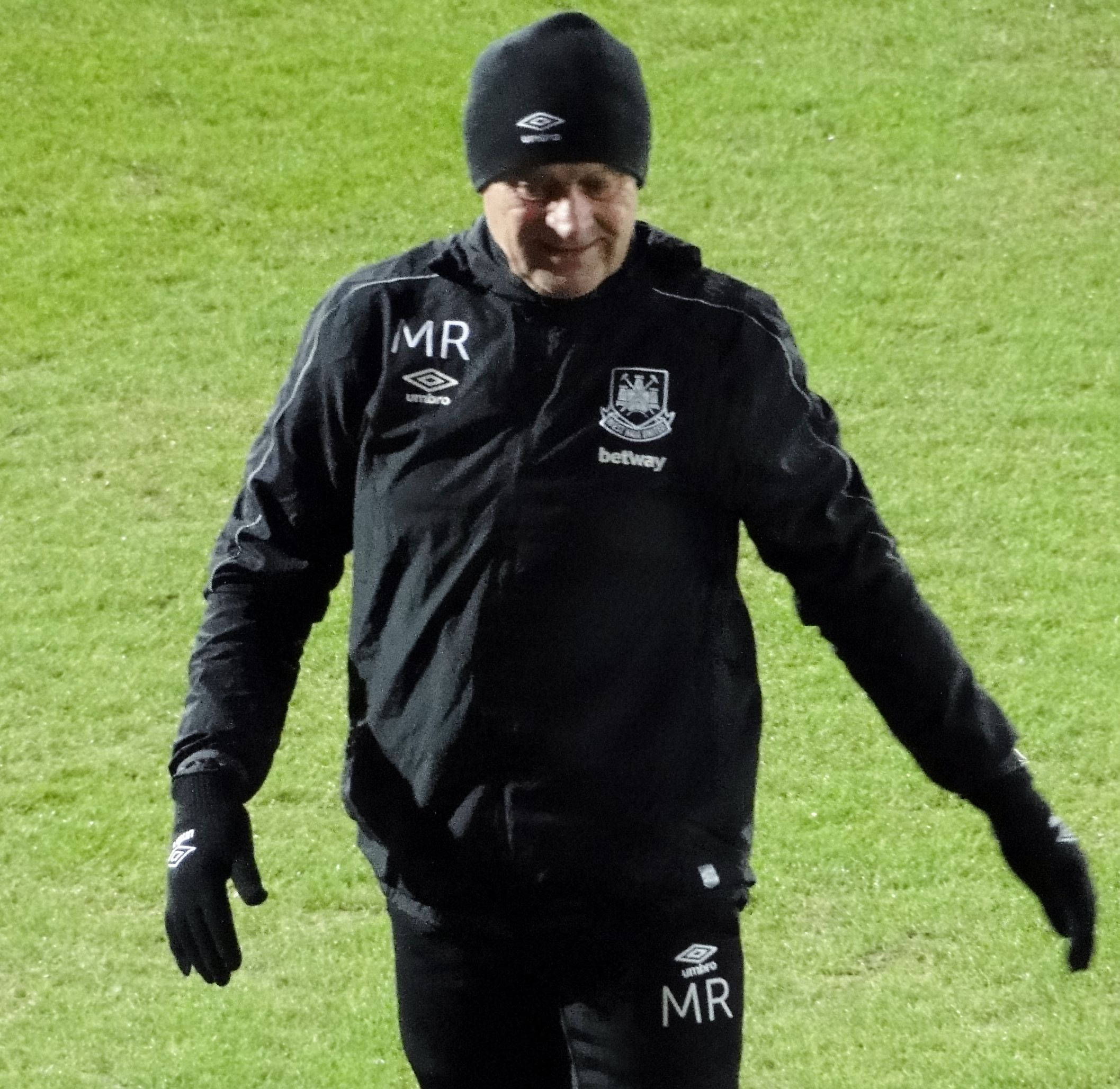
- Rak in 2016

Personal information
- Full name: Miljenko Rak
- Nationality: Croatian
- Born: 20 September 1947 (age 79) Šibenik, FPR Yugoslavia

Sport
- Sport: Handball
Title
1995–2006	Fitness coach	Dinamo Zagreb
2006–2012	Fitness coach	Croatia (football)
2012–2013	Fitness coach	Lokomotiv Moscow
2013–2015	Fitness coach	Beşiktaş

Miljenko Rak (born 20 September 1947) is a Croatian former long-jumper and fitness trainer. He had worked as the trainer with Olympic gold medal-winning skier, Janica Kostelić, and football manager, Slaven Bilić. He is currently fitness coach in Dinamo Zagreb and the Croatia men's national handball team.

Rak was the fitness coach for the Croatia national handball team that won the gold medal at the 2004 Summer Olympics in Athens.

Having studied for a degree is physical education at University of Novi Sad, competing for SFR Yugoslavia, as a long-jumper he took part in the 1967 Mediterranean Games in Tunis winning the gold medal with a jump of 7.53 metres (24 ft 8 in). Four years later in the 1971 Mediterranean Games he won the silver medal with a jump of 7.78 metres (25 ft 6 in), and in the 1979 Mediterranean Games in Split he won the bronze medal with a jump of 7.62 metres (25 ft 0 in).

Rak worked as a coach in Osijek training athletes such as 800-metre runner Slobodanka Čolović and long-jumper Siniša Ergotić.

Rak started as a footballing fitness coach with Dinamo Zagreb, after that he joined Slaven Bilić with the Croatia national football team. He followed Bilić to work with Lokomotiv Moscow, Beşiktaş and West Ham United. He left West Ham along with Bilić's other coaching staff when the manager was sacked on 6 November 2017.

In 2020, Rak joined the Croatia national handball team as the fitness coach again.
