= Richard Tamble =

American wrestler

Personal information
- Born: July 26, 1945 (age 81) Inglewood, California, U.S.

Sport
- Country: United States
- Sport: Wrestling
- Event: Greco-Roman
- College team: Adams State
- Team: USA

Richard Tamble (born July 26, 1945) is an American wrestler. He competed in the men's Greco-Roman 52 kg at the 1968 Summer Olympics.
