= Metin Çıkmaz =

Turkish wrestler

Personal information
- Nationality: Turkish
- Born: 1943 Kozan, Turkey
- Died: 2001 (aged 57–58)

Sport
- Sport: Wrestling

Metin Çıkmaz (born 1943) is a Turkish wrestler. He competed in the men's Greco-Roman 52 kg at the 1968 Summer Olympics.
