= Mohamed Salem (wrestler) =

Egyptian wrestler

Personal information
- Nationality: Egyptian
- Born: 8 May 1944 (age 80); Cairo, Egypt

Sport
- Sport: Wrestling

Mohamed Salem (born 8 May 1944) is an Egyptian wrestler. He competed in two events at the 1968 Summer Olympics.
