= Domenico Centurioni =

Italian wrestler

Personal information
- Nationality: Italian
- Born: 26 October 1940 (age 85) Rome, Italy

Sport
- Sport: Wrestling

Domenico Centurioni (born 26 October 1940) is an Italian wrestler. He competed in the men's Greco-Roman 52 kg at the 1968 Summer Olympics.
