= József Doncsecz =

Hungarian wrestler

Personal information
- Nationality: Hungarian
- Born: 16 January 1950 (age 75); Szentgotthárd, Hungary

Sport
- Sport: Wrestling

József Doncsecz (born 16 January 1950) is a Hungarian wrestler. He competed at the 1972 Summer Olympics and the 1976 Summer Olympics.
