= Alessandro Scatena =

Italian hurdler (born 1946)

Personal information
- Nationality: Italian
- Born: December 28, 1946 (age 79) Lucca, Italy

Sport
- Country: Italy
- Sport: Athletics
- Event: 400 metres hurdles

Achievements and titles
- Personal bests: 400 m: 48.4 (1971); 400 m hs: 50.5 (1972)
Medal record
Mediterranean Games
Gold medal – first place	1967 Tunis	400 metres hurdles

Alessandro Scatena (born 20 December 1946 in Lucca) was an Italian athlete who mainly competed in the 400 metre hurdles.

== Biography ==
He won one medal, at senior level, at the International athletics competitions. He has 10 caps in national team from 1966 to 1972.

== National titles ==
In the "Salvatore Morale era" Alessandro Scatena has won just one time the individual national championship.

- 1 win in the 400 metres hurdles (19671)

== See also ==
- 400 metres hurdles winners of Italian Athletics Championships
