= Ahmet Tren =

Turkish wrestler (born 1950)

Ahmet Tren (born 3 February 1950) is a Turkish former wrestler who competed in the 1972 Summer Olympics.
