= Miroslav Zeman =

Czech wrestler (1946–2025)

Medal record

Men's Greco-Roman wrestling

Representing Czechoslovakia

Olympic Games
Bronze medal – third place	1968 Mexico City	Flyweight

Miroslav Zeman (14 September 1946 – 25 December 2025) was a Czech wrestler who competed for Czechoslovakia. He won an Olympic bronze medal in Greco-Roman wrestling in 1968. He also competed at the 1972 Olympics, where he tied for fourth place.

Zeman was born Prague on 14 September 1946, and died on 25 December 2025, at the age of 79.
