= Antonino Caltabiano =

Italian wrestler (born 1955)

Antonino Caltabiano (born 21 April 1955 in Catania) is an Italian former wrestler who competed in the 1976 Summer Olympics, in the 1980 Summer Olympics, and in the 1984 Summer Olympics.
