= Fritz Huber (wrestler) =

German wrestler

Fritz Huber (born 6 April 1949 in Bad Reichenhall) is a German former wrestler who competed in the 1972 Summer Olympics.
