= Renzo Finelli =

Italian former middle distance runner

Personal information
- Nationality: Italian
- Born: August 24, 1955 (age 70) Anzola, Italy
- Height: 1.76 m (5 ft 9 1/2 in)
- Weight: 72 kg (159 lb)

Sport
- Country: Italy
- Sport: Athletics
- Event: Middle distance running
- Club: Panini Modena

Achievements and titles
- Personal best: 1500 m: 3:40.1 (1971)
Medal record
Mediterranean Games
Gold medal – first place	1967 Tunis	1500 metres

Renzo Finelli (born 24 August 1945) is an Italian former middle distance runner. He won one medal, at senior level, at the International athletics competitions.

== Biography ==
He competed in the 1968 Summer Olympics.

== National championships ==
Renzo Finelli has won 3 times the individual national championship.

- 1 win in the 1500 metres (1971)
- 2 wins in the 5000 metres (1966, 1969)
