= Furio Fusi =

Italian former sprinter (born 1947)

Personal information
- Nationality: Italian
- Born: December 4, 1947 (age 78) Savona, Italy
- Height: 1.75 m (5 ft 9 in)
- Weight: 70 kg (154 lb)

Sport
- Country: Italy
- Sport: Athletics
- Event: 400 metres

Achievements and titles
- Personal best: 400 m: 46.9 (1971)
Medal record
Mediterranean Games
Gold medal – first place	1967 Tunis	4x400 m

Furio Fusi (born 4 December 1947) is an Italian former sprinter who competed in the 1968 Summer Olympics.

== Olympic results ==
Year	Competition	Venue	Position	Event	Performance	Notes
1968	Olympic Games	Mexico City	7th	4x400 relay	3:04.6	

== National titles ==
- 1 win in 400 metres at the Italian Athletics Championships (1970)

== See also ==
- Italy national relay team
