= Carlo Laverda =

Italian sprinter

Personal information
- Nationality: Italian
- Born: January 7, 1947 (age 79) Vicenza, Italy

Sport
- Country: Italy
- Sport: Athletics
- Event: Sprint
- Club: C.S. Aeronautica Militare

Achievements and titles
- Personal bests: 100 m: 10.4; 200 m: 21.1; 400 m: 49.9
Medal record
Mediterranean Games
Gold medal – first place	Tunis 1967	4 × 100 m relay

Carlo Laverda (7 January 1947) is an Italian former sprinter.

== Biography ==
He won also two medals with the national relay team at the International athletics competitions. He has 7 caps in national team from 1965 to 1968.

== National titles ==
Carlo Laverda has won 1 time the national championship.

- 1 win in the 4 × 100 metres relay (1969)

== See also ==
- Italy national relay team
