= Javier León (wrestler) =

Peruvian wrestler (born 1953)

Javier León (born 30 July 1953) is a former Peruvian wrestler who had competed in the 1972 Summer Olympics.
