= Maria Vittoria Trio =

Italian long jumper

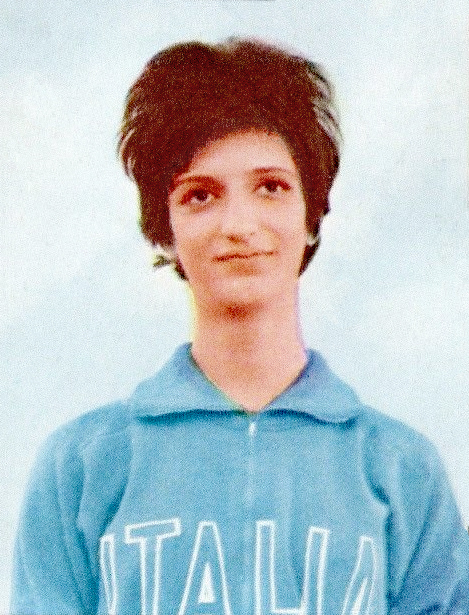

Personal information
- Nationality: Italian
- Born: September 18, 1947 (age 78) Turin, Italy
- Height: 1.80 m (5 ft 11 in)
- Weight: 58 kg (128 lb)

Sport
- Country: Italy
- Sport: Athletics
- Event: Long jump
- Club: Libertas Torino

Achievements and titles
- Personal best: Long jump: 6.52 m (1967)
Medal record
Mediterranean Games
| Gold medal – first place | 1967 Tunis | Long jump |

Maria Vittoria Trio (born 18 December 1947 in Turin) is a retired Italian long jumper

== Biography ==
In 1966, before the 1966 European Athletics Championships, after the introduction of the gender verification testing in sports, she was asked to undergo, but Trio, like many athletes at the time, refused and preferred to withdraw from the competitions in 1967.

In 2012, her 6.52 m, after 45 years, is still the ninth best all-time Italian performance.

== Achievements ==
| Year | Competition | Venue | Position | Event | Performance | Notes |
|---|---|---|---|---|---|---|
| 1964 | Olympic Games | (Japan) Tokyo | 14th | Long jump | 5.98 m | |
| 1967 | Mediterranean Games | (Tunisia) Tunis | 1st | Long jump | 6.13 m | |

== National titles ==
She has twice won the individual national championship.

- 2 wins in the long jump (1965, 1968)

== See also ==
- Italian all-time top lists - Long jump
- Italian record progression women's long jump
