= Petar Kirov =

Bulgarian Greco-Roman wrestler

Medal record

Men's Greco-Roman wrestling

Representing Bulgaria

Olympic Games
Gold medal – first place	1968 Mexico	52 kg
Gold medal – first place	1972 Munich	52 kg

World Championships
Gold medal – first place	1970 Edmonton	52 kg
Gold medal – first place	1971 Sofia	52 kg
Gold medal – first place	1974 Katowice	52 kg

Petar Kirov (Bulgarian: Петър Киров, born September 17, 1942) is a former Greco Roman wrestler from Bulgaria. He was born in Kalchevo, Yambol province.

Kirov was an Olympic gold winner from the games in Mexico 1968 and Munich 1972, three times champion of the World and four times champion of Europe.
