= Athanasios Zafeiropoulos =

Greek wrestler

Personal information
- Nationality: Greek
- Born: 12 February 1944 (age 82)

Sport
- Sport: Wrestling

Athanasios Zafeiropoulos (born 12 February 1944) is a Greek wrestler. He competed in the men's freestyle flyweight at the 1964 Summer Olympics.
