= Rolf Krauß =

German wrestler

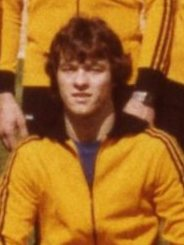
- Rolf Krauß in 1978

Personal information
- Nationality: German
- Born: 30 April 1954 (age 72) Ludwigshafen, West Germany

Sport
- Sport: Wrestling

Rolf Krauß (born 30 April 1954) is a German wrestler. He competed in the men's Greco-Roman 52 kg at the 1976 Summer Olympics.
