= Hassan El-Mech =

Moroccan sprinter

Personal information
- Nationality: Moroccan
- Born: حسن•المش; 1945 (age 80–81) Marrakech, Marrakesh-Safi

Sport
- Sport: Sprinting
- Event: 100 metres

Hassan El-Mech (born 1945) is a Moroccan sprinter. He competed in the men's 100 metres at the 1968 Summer Olympics.

He was born in 1945 in the city of Marrakech.
