= Shuichi Ishiguro =

Japanese wrestler

Personal information
- Nationality: Japanese
- Born: 6 August 1945 (age 80) Shizuoka, Japan

Sport
- Sport: Wrestling

Shuichi Ishiguro (石黒 修一, Ishiguro Shūichi; born 6 August 1945) is a Japanese wrestler. He competed in the men's Greco-Roman 52 kg at the 1968 Summer Olympics.
