= Sin Sang-sik =

South Korean wrestler (born 1941)

Personal information
- Nationality: South Korean
- Born: 12 October 1941 (age 83); Seoul, South Korea

Sport
- Sport: Wrestling

Sin Sang-sik (born 12 October 1941) is a South Korean wrestler. He competed at the 1964 Summer Olympics and the 1968 Summer Olympics.
