= Imre Alker =

Hungarian wrestler

Personal information
- Nationality: Hungarian
- Born: 1 December 1941 (age 83); Püspökladány, Hungary

Sport
- Sport: Wrestling

Imre Alker (born 1 December 1941) is a Hungarian wrestler. He competed at the 1964 Summer Olympics and the 1968 Summer Olympics.
