= Jamsrangiin Mönkh-Ochir =

Mongolian wrestler

Personal information
- Nationality: Mongolian
- Born: 12 May 1950 (age 74)

Sport
- Sport: Wrestling

Jamsrangiin Mönkh-Ochir (born 12 May 1950) is a Mongolian wrestler. He competed at the 1972 Summer Olympics and the 1976 Summer Olympics.
