= Julien Mewis =

Belgian wrestler

Personal information
- Nationality: Belgian
- Born: 8 April 1958 (age 66); Brasschaat, Belgium

Sport
- Sport: Wrestling

Julien Mewis (born 8 April 1958) is a Belgian wrestler.

== Career ==
He competed at the 1976 Summer Olympics and the 1980 Summer Olympics.
