= Vincenzo Grassi =

Italian wrestler

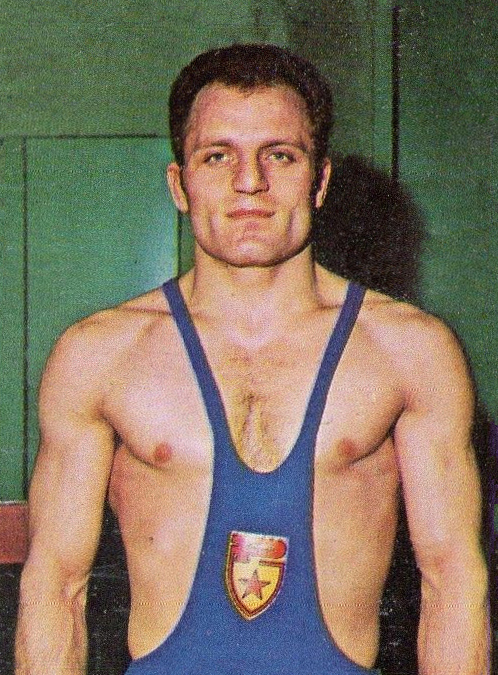

Personal information
- Born: 17 November 1938 (age 87) Naples, Italy
- Height: 1.57 m (5 ft 2 in)
- Weight: 52 kg (115 lb)

Sport
- Sport: Freestyle wrestling
- Club: Societa' Sportiva Pirelli Napoli

Vincenzo Grassi (born 17 November 1938) is a retired Italian freestyle wrestler. He competed at the 1964, 1968 and 1972 Olympics with the best result of fifth place in 1968. He finished in fourth place at the 1962 World Championships and at the 1970 and 1972 European Championships.
