= André Zoete =

French wrestler

Personal information
- Nationality: French
- Born: 30 August 1931 (age 95) Lille, France

Sport
- Sport: Wrestling

André Zoete (born 30 August 1931) is a French wrestler. He competed at the 1956 Summer Olympics, the 1960 Summer Olympics and the 1964 Summer Olympics.
