= Armais Sayadov =

Soviet amateur wrestler (born 1937)

Personal information
- Born: 18 October 1937 (age 88) Baku, Azerbaijan
- Died: December 2010 Ukraine
- Height: 152 cm (5 ft 0 in)

Sport
- Sport: Greco-Roman wrestling
- Club: Dynamo
- Coached by: Zaven Agadzanyan
Medal record
Representing the Soviet Union
World Championships
Gold medal – first place	1961 Yokohama	-52 kg
European Championships
Silver medal – second place	1966 Essen	-57 kg

Armais Vaganovich Sayadov (Russian: Армаис Ваганович Саядов, born 18 October 1937) is an Armenian retired flyweight Greco-Roman wrestler. He competed for the Soviet Union at the 1964 Summer Olympics, but was eliminated after three bouts. Sayadov won the world title in 1961 and placed second at the 1966 European Championships. Domestically he won the Soviet title in 1958, 1961, 1963 and 1965. His elder brother Georgy competed in freestyle wrestling at the 1952 Olympics.

Armais was born to the Armenian wrestler Vagan Sayadyan, who changed his last name to Sayadov to blend in Azerbaijan. Besides Georgy, Armais had three other brothers. Initially, both Georgy and Armais competed as flyweights in freestyle wrestlers, but Armais later moved to Greco-Roman wrestling to avoid competing against his brother. After retiring from competitions, he had a long career as a coach and referee. In 1990, during the Baku pogrom, he fled to Kyiv, Ukraine.
