= Beya Bouabdallah =

Tunisian sportswoman (born 1944)

Personal information
- Born: December 24, 1944 (age 81)

Beya Bouabdallah (born December 24, 1944) is a former Tunisian female basketball player, female handball player, female volleyball player and female athletics player.
