= Polde Milek =

Slovenian high jumper

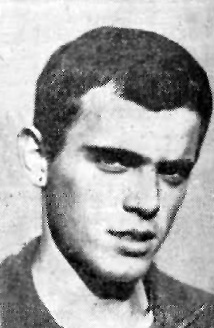
- Polde Milek in 1968

Personal information
- Nationality: Slovenian
- Born: 4 November 1948 (age 77)

Sport
- Sport: Athletics
- Event: High jump

Polde Milek (born 4 November 1948) is a Slovenian athlete. He competed in the men's high jump at the 1968 Summer Olympics, representing Yugoslavia.
