= Enrique Jiménez (wrestler) =

Mexican wrestler (born 1944)

Personal information
- Born: 12 October 1944 (age 81) Oaxaca City, Mexico

Sport
- Sport: Wrestling

Enrique Jiménez (born 12 October 1944) is a Mexican wrestler. He competed at the 1968 Summer Olympics and the 1972 Summer Olympics.
