= César del Rio =

Mexican wrestler

Personal information
- Nationality: Mexican
- Born: 12 August 1941 (age 85)

Sport
- Sport: Wrestling

César del Rio (born 12 August 1941) is a Mexican wrestler. He competed in two events at the 1964 Summer Olympics.
