= Gheorghe Stoiciu =

Romanian wrestler

Gheorghe Stoiciu (born 3 September 1943) is a Romanian former wrestler who competed in the 1968 Summer Olympics and in the 1972 Summer Olympics.
