= Vitaly Konstantinov =

Russian wrestler (born 1949)

Medal record

Men's Greco-Roman wrestling

Representing the Soviet Union

Olympic Games
Gold medal – first place	1976 Montreal	Flyweight

Vitaly Konstantinov (born 1949) is a Russian wrestler. He was Olympic gold medalist in Greco-Roman wrestling in 1976, competing for the Soviet Union. He won a gold medal at the 1975 World Wrestling Championships.
