= Rolf Lacour =

German wrestler (1937–2018)

Rolf Lacour (26 June 1937 – 28 January 2018) was a German wrestler who competed in the 1964 Summer Olympics, in the 1968 Summer Olympics, and in the 1972 Summer Olympics.
