= Mohamed Karmous =

Moroccan wrestler (born 1949)

Personal information
- Nationality: Moroccan
- Born: 5 June 1949 (age 75); Casablanca, Morocco

Sport
- Sport: Wrestling

Mohamed Karmous (born 5 June 1949) is a Moroccan wrestler. He competed at the 1968 Summer Olympics, the 1972 Summer Olympics and the 1976 Summer Olympics.
