= Leonel Duarte (wrestler) =

Portuguese wrestler (1949–2013)

Personal information
- Nationality: Portuguese
- Born: 17 April 1949
- Died: 19 July 2013 (aged 64)

Sport
- Sport: Wrestling

Leonel Duarte (17 April 1949 – 19 July 2013) was a Portuguese wrestler. He competed at the 1968 Summer Olympics, the 1972 Summer Olympics and the 1976 Summer Olympics.
