= Boško Marinko =

Serbian wrestler (1939–2020)

Medal record

Men's wrestling

Representing Yugoslavia

World Championships
| Bronze medal – third place | 1970 Edmonton | Flyweight |

European Championships
| Gold medal – first place | 1969 Modena | 52kg |
| Silver medal – second place | 1966 Essen | 52kg |
| Silver medal – second place | 1970 Berlin | 52kg |

Mediterranean Games
| Gold medal – first place | 1971 Izmir | 52kg |

Boško Marinko (Serbian Cyrillic: Бошко Маринко; Koljane, 11 August 1939 – Subotica, 18 July 2020) was a Serbian wrestler who competed in the 1968 Summer Olympics and 1972 Summer Olympics.
