= Vasilios Ganotis =

Greek wrestler

Personal information
- Nationality: Greek
- Born: 16 February 1942 Agios Konstantinos, Greece
- Died: April 2015 (aged 73)

Sport
- Sport: Wrestling

Vasilios Ganotis (16 February 1942 – April 2015) was a Greek wrestler. He competed at the 1964 Summer Olympics, the 1968 Summer Olympics and the 1972 Summer Olympics.
