= 1967 Mediterranean Games =

5th edition of the Mediterranean Games

V Mediterranean Games Tunis 1967
- Host city: Tunis, Tunisia
- Nations: 12
- Athletes: 1,249
- Events: 93 in 14 sports
- Opening: 8 September 1967
- Closing: 17 September 1967
- Opened by: Habib Bourguiba
- Main venue: Stade El Menzah

The 1967 Mediterranean Games, officially known as the V Mediterranean Games, and commonly known as Tunis 1967, were the 5th Mediterranean Games. The Games were held in Tunis, Tunisia over 9 days, from 8 to 17 September 1967, where 1,249 athletes (1,211 men and 38 women) from 11 countries participated. For the first time, women took part in the games. There were a total of 93 medal events from 14 different sports.

== Participating nations ==
The following is a list of nations that participated in the 1967 Mediterranean Games:

- Algeria
- Spain
- France
- Greece
- Italy
- Lebanon
- Libya
- Morocco
- Malta
- Tunisia
- Turkey
- Yugoslavia

== Sports ==
The second Mediterranean Games sports program featured 93 events in 14 sports. The numbers in parentheses represent the number of medal events per sport.

- Athletics (28)
- Basketball (1)
- Boxing (10)
- Cycling (3)
- Fencing (3)
- Football (1)
- Gymnastics (8)
- Handball (1)
- Swimming (11)
- Tennis (2)
- Volleyball (1)
- Water polo (1)
- Weightlifting (7)
- Wrestling (16)

== Medals ==
* Host nation (Tunisia)

Rank	Nation	Gold	Silver	Bronze	Total
1	Italy	35	26	22	83
2	Yugoslavia	15	16	5	36
3	Spain	10	14	27	51
4	Turkey	9	9	6	24
5	France	7	4	4	15
6	Tunisia*	5	9	11	25
7	Greece	5	6	12	23
8	Morocco	1	1	3	5
9	Lebanon	0	1	2	3
10	Algeria	0	0	3	3
11	Libya	0	0	2	2
Totals (11 entries)		87	86	97	270

== See also ==
- International Mediterranean Games Committee
- Mediterranean Games Athletic results at gbrathletics website
