= Wrestling at the 1964 Summer Olympics – Men's Greco-Roman lightweight =

Wrestling at the Olympics

Men's Greco-Roman lightweight at the Games of the XVIII Olympiad
- Venue: Komazawa Gymnasium
- Dates: 16–19 October 1964
- Competitors: 19 from 19 nations

Medalists
1st place, gold medalist(s)		Kazım Ayvaz	Turkey
2nd place, silver medalist(s)		Valeriu Bularcă	Romania
3rd place, bronze medalist(s)		Davit Gvantseladze	Soviet Union

The men's Greco-Roman lightweight competition at the 1964 Summer Olympics in Tokyo took place from 16 to 19 October at the Komazawa Gymnasium. Nations were limited to one competitor. Lightweight was the fourth-lightest category, including wrestlers weighing 63 to 70 kilograms (138.9 to 154.3 lb).

== Competition format ==
This Greco-Roman wrestling competition continued to use the "bad points" elimination system introduced at the 1928 Summer Olympics for Greco-Roman and at the 1932 Summer Olympics for freestyle wrestling, as adjusted at the 1960 Summer Olympics. Each bout awarded 4 points. If the victory was by fall, the winner received 0 and the loser 4. If the victory was by decision, the winner received 1 and the loser 3. If the bout was tied, each wrestler received 2 points. A wrestler who accumulated 6 or more points was eliminated. Rounds continued until there were 3 or fewer uneliminated wrestlers. If only 1 wrestler remained, he received the gold medal. If 2 wrestlers remained, point totals were ignored and they faced each other for gold and silver (if they had already wrestled each other, that result was used). If 3 wrestlers remained, point totals were ignored and a round-robin was held among those 3 to determine medals (with previous head-to-head results, if any, counting for this round-robin).

== Results ==
=== Round 1 ===
Romero withdrew after his bout.

Bouts

Winner	Nation	Victory Type	Loser	Nation
James Burke	United States	Tie	Hossein Ebrahimian	Iran
Alejandro Echaniz	Mexico	Tie	Wahid Ullah Zaid	Afghanistan
Stevan Horvat	Yugoslavia	Decision	Franz Berger	Austria
Eero Tapio	Finland	Tie	Valeriu Bularcă	Romania
Dimitrios Savvas	Greece	Decision	Kim Ik-jong	South Korea
Tokuaki Fujita	Japan	Fall	Raúl Romero	Argentina
Davit Gvantseladze	Soviet Union	Decision	Franz Schmitt	United Team of Germany
Rune Johnsson	Sweden	Decision	Kurt Madsen	Denmark
Kazım Ayvaz	Turkey	Decision	Mahmoud Ibrahim	Egypt
Ivan Ivanov	Bulgaria	Bye	N/A	N/A

Points

Rank	Wrestler	Nation	R1
1	Tokuaki Fujita	Japan	0
1	Ivan Ivanov	Bulgaria	0
3	Kazım Ayvaz	Turkey	1
3	Davit Gvantseladze	Soviet Union	1
3	Stevan Horvat	Yugoslavia	1
3	Rune Johnsson	Sweden	1
3	Dimitrios Savvas	Greece	1
8	Valeriu Bularcă	Romania	2
8	James Burke	United States	2
8	Hossein Ebrahimian	Iran	2
8	Alejandro Echaniz	Mexico	2
8	Eero Tapio	Finland	2
8	Wahid Ullah Zaid	Afghanistan	2
14	Franz Berger	Austria	3
14	Mahmoud Ibrahim	Egypt	3
14	Kim Ik-jong	South Korea	3
14	Kurt Madsen	Denmark	3
14	Franz Schmitt	United Team of Germany	3
19	Raúl Romero	Argentina	4*

=== Round 2 ===
Two of the wrestlers who had a tie in round 1 lost by fall in this round and were eliminated. Three more were eliminated with a second loss. Each of the remaining 13 men had at least 1 point, with Fujita, Johnsson, and Ivanov in the lead with only 1.

Bouts

Winner	Nation	Victory Type	Loser	Nation
Ivan Ivanov	Bulgaria	Decision	James Burke	United States
Eero Tapio	Finland	Fall	Hossein Ebrahimian	Iran
Valeriu Bularcă	Romania	Decision	Kim Ik-jong	South Korea
Tokuaki Fujita	Japan	Decision	Dimitrios Savvas	Greece
Rune Johnsson	Sweden	Fall	Alejandro Echaniz	Mexico
Kurt Madsen	Denmark	Decision	Wahid Ullah Zaid	Afghanistan
Franz Schmitt	United Team of Germany	Decision	Franz Berger	Austria
Stevan Horvat	Yugoslavia	Decision	Mahmoud Ibrahim	Egypt
Kazım Ayvaz	Turkey	Decision	Davit Gvantseladze	Soviet Union

Points

Rank	Wrestler	Nation	R1	R2	Total
1	Tokuaki Fujita	Japan	0	1	1
1	Rune Johnsson	Sweden	1	0	1
1	Ivan Ivanov	Bulgaria	0	1	1
4	Kazım Ayvaz	Turkey	1	1	2
4	Stevan Horvat	Yugoslavia	1	1	2
4	Eero Tapio	Finland	2	0	2
7	Valeriu Bularcă	Romania	2	1	3
8	Davit Gvantseladze	Soviet Union	1	3	4
8	Kurt Madsen	Denmark	3	1	4
8	Dimitrios Savvas	Greece	1	3	4
8	Franz Schmitt	United Team of Germany	3	1	4
12	James Burke	United States	2	3	5
12	Wahid Ullah Zaid	Afghanistan	2	3	5
14	Franz Berger	Austria	3	3	6
14	Hossein Ebrahimian	Iran	2	4	6
14	Alejandro Echaniz	Mexico	2	4	6
14	Mahmoud Ibrahim	Egypt	3	3	6
14	Kim Ik-jong	South Korea	3	3	6

=== Round 3 ===
Four wrestlers were eliminated. Ayvaz, with the assistance of a bye, moved up to join Fujita in the lead at 2 points.

Bouts

Winner	Nation	Victory Type	Loser	Nation
Eero Tapio	Finland	Decision	Ivan Ivanov	Bulgaria
Valeriu Bularcă	Romania	Foul	James Burke	United States
Dimitrios Savvas	Greece	Tie	Rune Johnsson	Sweden
Tokuaki Fujita	Japan	Decision	Kurt Madsen	Denmark
Franz Schmitt	United Team of Germany	Fall	Wahid Ullah Zaid	Afghanistan
Davit Gvantseladze	Soviet Union	Decision	Stevan Horvat	Yugoslavia
Kazım Ayvaz	Turkey	Bye	N/A	N/A

Points

Rank	Wrestler	Nation	R1	R2	R3	Total
1	Kazım Ayvaz	Turkey	1	1	0	2
1	Tokuaki Fujita	Japan	0	1	1	2
3	Valeriu Bularcă	Romania	2	1	0	3
3	Rune Johnsson	Sweden	1	0	2	3
3	Eero Tapio	Finland	2	0	1	3
6	Ivan Ivanov	Bulgaria	0	1	3	4
6	Franz Schmitt	United Team of Germany	3	1	0	4
8	Stevan Horvat	Yugoslavia	1	1	3	5
8	Davit Gvantseladze	Soviet Union	1	3	1	5
10	Dimitrios Savvas	Greece	1	3	2	6
11	Kurt Madsen	Denmark	3	1	3	7
12	James Burke	United States	2	3	4	9
12	Wahid Ullah Zaid	Afghanistan	2	3	4	9

=== Round 4 ===
Three wrestlers were eliminated, leaving 6 in contention. Ayvaz was now in sole possession of the lead at 3 points. Bularcă and Fujita each had 4; the remaining 3 men had 5.

Bouts

Winner	Nation	Victory Type	Loser	Nation
Kazım Ayvaz	Turkey	Decision	Ivan Ivanov	Bulgaria
Eero Tapio	Finland	Tie	Tokuaki Fujita	Japan
Valeriu Bularcă	Romania	Decision	Rune Johnsson	Sweden
Stevan Horvat	Yugoslavia	Fall	Franz Schmitt	United Team of Germany
Davit Gvantseladze	Soviet Union	Bye	N/A	N/A

Points

Rank	Wrestler	Nation	R1	R2	R3	R4	Total
1	Kazım Ayvaz	Turkey	1	1	0	1	3
2	Valeriu Bularcă	Romania	2	1	0	1	4
2	Tokuaki Fujita	Japan	0	1	1	2	4
4	Davit Gvantseladze	Soviet Union	1	3	1	0	5
4	Stevan Horvat	Yugoslavia	1	1	3	0	5
4	Eero Tapio	Finland	2	0	1	2	5
7	Rune Johnsson	Sweden	1	0	2	3	6
8	Ivan Ivanov	Bulgaria	0	1	3	3	7
9	Franz Schmitt	United Team of Germany	3	1	0	4	8

=== Round 5 ===
Five of the six wrestlers were eliminated in round 5, with Ayvaz the only man to stay below 6 points and therefore the gold medalist. The three-way tie for second place necessitated a final round to determine silver, bronze, and 4th.

Bouts

Winner	Nation	Victory Type	Loser	Nation
Davit Gvantseladze	Soviet Union	Decision	Eero Tapio	Finland
Kazım Ayvaz	Turkey	Tie	Valeriu Bularcă	Romania
Tokuaki Fujita	Japan	Tie	Stevan Horvat	Yugoslavia

Points

Rank	Wrestler	Nation	R1	R2	R3	R4	R5	Total
1st place, gold medalist(s)	Kazım Ayvaz	Turkey	1	1	0	1	2	5
2	Valeriu Bularcă	Romania	2	1	0	1	2	6
2	Tokuaki Fujita	Japan	0	1	1	2	2	6
2	Davit Gvantseladze	Soviet Union	1	3	1	0	1	6
5	Stevan Horvat	Yugoslavia	1	1	3	0	2	7
6	Eero Tapio	Finland	2	0	1	2	3	8

=== Final round ===
With three wrestlers tied for 2nd place, none of whom had faced each other, there was a final round-robin. Bularcă prevailed in a close contest, defeating Gvantseladze by decision before drawing against Fujita. Gvantseladze took the bronze medal, with one win and one loss. Fujita, with the loss and tie, finished 4th.

Bouts

Winner	Nation	Victory Type	Loser	Nation
Valeriu Bularcă	Romania	Decision	Davit Gvantseladze	Soviet Union
Davit Gvantseladze	Soviet Union	Decision	Tokuaki Fujita	Japan
Valeriu Bularcă	Romania	Tie	Tokuaki Fujita	Japan

Points

Rank	Wrestler	Nation	Points
2nd place, silver medalist(s)	Valeriu Bularcă	Romania	3
3rd place, bronze medalist(s)	Davit Gvantseladze	Soviet Union	4
4	Tokuaki Fujita	Japan	5
