= Wrestling at the 1972 Summer Olympics – Men's Greco-Roman 100 kg =

Men's Greco-Roman 100 kg at the Games of the XX Olympiad
- Venue: Messe München
- Dates: 6–10 September 1972
- Competitors: 14 from 14 nations

Medalists
1st place, gold medalist(s)		Nicolae Martinescu	Romania
2nd place, silver medalist(s)		Nikolai Yakovenko	Soviet Union
3rd place, bronze medalist(s)		Ferenc Kiss	Hungary

The Men's Greco-Roman 100 kg at the 1972 Summer Olympics as part of the wrestling program at the Fairgrounds, Judo and Wrestling Hall.

== Medalists ==
Gold	Nicolae Martinescu; Romania
Silver	Nikolai Yakovenko; Soviet Union
Bronze	Ferenc Kiss; Hungary

== Tournament results ==
The competition used a form of negative points tournament, with negative points given for any result short of a fall. Accumulation of 6 negative points eliminated the wrestler. When only two or three wrestlers remain, a special final round is used to determine the order of the medals.

Legend

- DNA — Did not appear
- TPP — Total penalty points
- MPP — Match penalty points

Penalties

- 0 — Won by Fall, Passivity, Injury and Forfeit
- 0.5 — Won by Technical Superiority
- 1 — Won by Points
- 2 — Draw
- 2.5 — Draw, Passivity
- 3 — Lost by Points
- 3.5 — Lost by Technical Superiority
- 4 — Lost by Fall, Passivity, Injury and Forfeit

=== Round 1 ===
TPP	MPP		Time		MPP	TPP
2	2	Hristo Ignatov (BUL)		Pelle Svensson (SWE)	2	2
3	3	Aimo Mäenpää (FIN)		Tore Hem (NOR)	1	1
2	2	Rudolf Lüscher (SUI)		Hassan Bechara (LIB)	2	2
0	0	Nikolai Yakovenko (URS)	7:23	Burke Deadrich (USA)	4	4
1	1	Andrzej Skrzydlewski (POL)		Lorenz Hecher (FRG)	3	3
1	1	Ferenc Kiss (HUN)		Fredi Albrecht (GDR)	3	3
3.5	3.5	Makoto Saito (JPN)		Nicolae Martinescu (ROU)	0.5	0.5

=== Round 2 ===
TPP	MPP		Time		MPP	TPP
2	0	Hristo Ignatov (BUL)	5:48	Aimo Mäenpää (FIN)	4	7
6	4	Pelle Svensson (SWE)	0:42	Tore Hem (NOR)	0	1
6	4	Rudolf Lüscher (SUI)	1:44	Nikolai Yakovenko (URS)	0	0
8	4	Burke Deadrich (USA)	1:23	Andrzej Skrzydlewski (POL)	0	1
7	4	Lorenz Hecher (FRG)	8:23	Ferenc Kiss (HUN)	4	5
4	1	Fredi Albrecht (GDR)		Makoto Saito (JPN)	3	6.5
0.5		Nicolae Martinescu (ROU)		Bye		
2		Hassan Bechara (LIB)		DNA		

=== Round 3 ===
TPP	MPP		Time		MPP	TPP
1.5	1	Nicolae Martinescu (ROU)		Hristo Ignatov (BUL)	3	5
4	3	Tore Hem (NOR)		Nikolai Yakovenko (URS)	1	1
4.5	3.5	Andrzej Skrzydlewski (POL)		Ferenc Kiss (HUN)	0.5	5.5
4		Fredi Albrecht (GDR)		Bye		

=== Round 4 ===
TPP	MPP		Time		MPP	TPP
7	3	Fredi Albrecht (GDR)		Nicolae Martinescu (ROU)	1	2.5
5	0	Hristo Ignatov (BUL)	1:24	Tore Hem (NOR)	4	8
1	0	Nikolai Yakovenko (URS)	1:25	Andrzej Skrzydlewski (POL)	4	8.5
5.5		Ferenc Kiss (HUN)		Bye		

=== Round 5 ===
TPP	MPP		Time		MPP	TPP
6.5	1	Ferenc Kiss (HUN)		Nicolae Martinescu (ROU)	3	5.5
9	4	Hristo Ignatov (BUL)	8:35	Nikolai Yakovenko (URS)	0	1

=== Final ===
Results from the preliminary round are carried forward into the final (shown in yellow).

TPP	MPP		Time		MPP	TPP
0	0	Nicolae Martinescu (ROU)	0:00	Nikolai Yakovenko (URS)	4	4

== Final standings ==
1. Nicolae Martinescu (ROU)
2. Nikolai Yakovenko (URS)
3. Ferenc Kiss (HUN)
4. Hristo Ignatov (BUL)
5. Fredi Albrecht (GDR)
6. Tore Hem (NOR)
