= Wrestling at the 1964 Summer Olympics – Men's Greco-Roman light heavyweight =

Wrestling at the Olympics

Men's Greco-Roman light heavyweight at the Games of the XVIII Olympiad
- Venue: Komazawa Gymnasium
- Dates: 16–19 October 1964
- Competitors: 18 from 18 nations

Medalists
1st place, gold medalist(s)		Boyan Radev	Bulgaria
2nd place, silver medalist(s)		Per Svensson	Sweden
3rd place, bronze medalist(s)		Heinz Kiehl	United Team of Germany

The men's Greco-Roman light heavyweight competition at the 1964 Summer Olympics in Tokyo took place from 16 to 19 October at the Komazawa Gymnasium. Nations were limited to one competitor. Light heavyweight was the second-heaviest category, including wrestlers weighing 87 to 97 kilograms (191.8 to 213.8 lb).

== Competition format ==
This Greco-Roman wrestling competition continued to use the "bad points" elimination system introduced at the 1928 Summer Olympics for Greco-Roman and at the 1932 Summer Olympics for freestyle wrestling, as adjusted at the 1960 Summer Olympics. Each bout awarded 4 points. If the victory was by fall, the winner received 0 and the loser 4. If the victory was by decision, the winner received 1 and the loser 3. If the bout was tied, each wrestler received 2 points. A wrestler who accumulated 6 or more points was eliminated. Rounds continued until there were 3 or fewer uneliminated wrestlers. If only 1 wrestler remained, he received the gold medal. If 2 wrestlers remained, point totals were ignored and they faced each other for gold and silver (if they had already wrestled each other, that result was used). If 3 wrestlers remained, point totals were ignored and a round-robin was held among those 3 to determine medals (with previous head-to-head results, if any, counting for this round-robin).

== Results ==
=== Round 1 ===
Mane withdrew after his bout.

Bouts

Winner	Nation	Victory Type	Loser	Nation
Rostom Abashidze	Soviet Union	Tie	Petar Cucić	Yugoslavia
Ferenc Kiss	Hungary	Fall	Maruti Mane	India
Lucjan Sosnowski	Poland	Tie	Nicolae Martinescu	Romania
Adelmo Bulgarelli	Italy	Tie	Gıyasettin Yılmaz	Turkey
Aimo Mäenpää	Finland	Decision	Akira Nakaura	Japan
Eugen Wiesberger Jr.	Austria	Fall	Gang Du-man	South Korea
Boyan Radev	Bulgaria	Foul	Pat Lovell	United States
Heinz Kiehl	United Team of Germany	Fall	José Panizo	Spain
Pelle Svensson	Sweden	Decision	Peter Jutzeler	Switzerland

Points

Rank	Wrestler	Nation	R1
1	Heinz Kiehl	United Team of Germany	0
1	Boyan Radev	Bulgaria	0
1	Ferenc Kiss	Hungary	0
1	Eugen Wiesberger Jr.	Austria	0
5	Aimo Mäenpää	Finland	1
5	Pelle Svensson	Sweden	1
7	Rostom Abashidze	Soviet Union	2
7	Adelmo Bulgarelli	Italy	2
7	Petar Cucić	Yugoslavia	2
7	Nicolae Martinescu	Romania	2
7	Lucjan Sosnowski	Poland	2
7	Gıyasettin Yılmaz	Turkey	2
13	Peter Jutzeler	Switzerland	3
13	Akira Nakaura	Japan	3
15	Gang Du-man	South Korea	4
15	Pat Lovell	United States	4
15	José Panizo	Spain	4
18	Maruti Mane	India	4*

=== Round 2 ===
Four wrestlers were eliminated, leaving 13 in competition. Kiehl and Radev each made it through the first two rounds with 0 points.

Bouts

Winner	Nation	Victory Type	Loser	Nation
Rostom Abashidze	Soviet Union	Decision	Ferenc Kiss	Hungary
Petar Cucić	Yugoslavia	Tie	Lucjan Sosnowski	Poland
Nicolae Martinescu	Romania	Decision	Adelmo Bulgarelli	Italy
Gıyasettin Yılmaz	Turkey	Fall	Akira Nakaura	Japan
Aimo Mäenpää	Finland	Decision	Eugen Wiesberger Jr.	Austria
Boyan Radev	Bulgaria	Fall	Gang Du-man	South Korea
Heinz Kiehl	United Team of Germany	Fall	Pat Lovell	United States
Peter Jutzeler	Switzerland	Fall	José Panizo	Spain
Pelle Svensson	Sweden	Bye	N/A	N/A

Points

Rank	Wrestler	Nation	R1	R2	Total
1	Heinz Kiehl	United Team of Germany	0	0	0
1	Boyan Radev	Bulgaria	0	0	0
3	Pelle Svensson	Sweden	1	0	1
4	Aimo Mäenpää	Finland	1	1	2
4	Gıyasettin Yılmaz	Turkey	2	0	2
6	Rostom Abashidze	Soviet Union	2	1	3
6	Peter Jutzeler	Switzerland	3	0	3
6	Ferenc Kiss	Hungary	0	3	3
6	Nicolae Martinescu	Romania	2	1	3
6	Eugen Wiesberger Jr.	Austria	0	3	3
11	Petar Cucić	Yugoslavia	2	2	4
11	Lucjan Sosnowski	Poland	2	2	4
13	Adelmo Bulgarelli	Italy	2	3	5
14	Akira Nakaura	Japan	3	4	7
15	Gang Du-man	South Korea	4	4	8
15	Pat Lovell	United States	4	4	8
15	José Panizo	Spain	4	4	8

=== Round 3 ===
Four more wrestlers were eliminated. Radev still had 0 points, while the next closest wrestlers had 3.

Bouts

Winner	Nation	Victory Type	Loser	Nation
Pelle Svensson	Sweden	Tie	Rostom Abashidze	Soviet Union
Ferenc Kiss	Hungary	Decision	Petar Cucić	Yugoslavia
Adelmo Bulgarelli	Italy	Decision	Lucjan Sosnowski	Poland
Nicolae Martinescu	Romania	Decision	Gıyasettin Yılmaz	Turkey
Boyan Radev	Bulgaria	Default	Aimo Mäenpää	Finland
Eugen Wiesberger Jr.	Austria	Decision	Heinz Kiehl	United Team of Germany
Peter Jutzeler	Switzerland	Bye	N/A	N/A

Points

Rank	Wrestler	Nation	R1	R2	R3	Total
1	Boyan Radev	Bulgaria	0	0	0	0
2	Peter Jutzeler	Switzerland	3	0	0	3
2	Heinz Kiehl	United Team of Germany	0	0	3	3
2	Pelle Svensson	Sweden	1	0	2	3
5	Ferenc Kiss	Hungary	0	3	1	4
5	Nicolae Martinescu	Romania	2	1	1	4
5	Eugen Wiesberger Jr.	Austria	0	3	1	4
8	Rostom Abashidze	Soviet Union	2	1	2	5
8	Gıyasettin Yılmaz	Turkey	2	0	3	5
10	Adelmo Bulgarelli	Italy	2	3	1	6
10	Aimo Mäenpää	Finland	1	1	4	6
12	Petar Cucić	Yugoslavia	2	2	3	7
12	Lucjan Sosnowski	Poland	2	2	3	7

=== Round 4 ===
More than half of the wrestlers (5 of 9) were eliminated. Radev finally received his first point, but still led at 1—guaranteeing he would make it through round 5 as well.

Bouts

Winner	Nation	Victory Type	Loser	Nation
Rostom Abashidze	Soviet Union	Decision	Peter Jutzeler	Switzerland
Pelle Svensson	Sweden	Tie	Ferenc Kiss	Hungary
Nicolae Martinescu	Romania	Decision	Eugen Wiesberger Jr.	Austria
Boyan Radev	Bulgaria	Decision	Gıyasettin Yılmaz	Turkey
Heinz Kiehl	United Team of Germany	Bye	N/A	N/A

Points

Rank	Wrestler	Nation	R1	R2	R3	R4	Total
1	Boyan Radev	Bulgaria	0	0	0	1	1
2	Heinz Kiehl	United Team of Germany	0	0	3	0	3
3	Nicolae Martinescu	Romania	2	1	1	1	5
3	Pelle Svensson	Sweden	1	0	2	2	5
5	Rostom Abashidze	Soviet Union	2	1	2	1	6
5	Peter Jutzeler	Switzerland	3	0	0	3	6
5	Ferenc Kiss	Hungary	0	3	1	2	6
8	Eugen Wiesberger Jr.	Austria	0	3	1	3	7
9	Gıyasettin Yılmaz	Turkey	2	0	3	3	8

=== Round 5 ===
The fifth round eliminated 3 of the 4 remaining wrestlers; Radev, as the only man left with fewer than 6 points, took the gold medal. The tie in the standings between Svensson and Kiehl was broken by their head-to-head results in this round; Svensson won the bout between them and earned silver.

Bouts

Winner	Nation	Victory Type	Loser	Nation
Pelle Svensson	Sweden	Decision	Heinz Kiehl	United Team of Germany
Boyan Radev	Bulgaria	Decision	Nicolae Martinescu	Romania

Points

Rank	Wrestler	Nation	R1	R2	R3	R4	R5	Total
1st place, gold medalist(s)	Boyan Radev	Bulgaria	0	0	0	1	1	2
2nd place, silver medalist(s)	Pelle Svensson	Sweden	1	0	2	2	1	6
3rd place, bronze medalist(s)	Heinz Kiehl	United Team of Germany	0	0	3	0	3	6
4	Nicolae Martinescu	Romania	2	1	1	1	3	8
