= Bulgaria at the 1964 Summer Olympics =

- IOC code: BUL
- NOC: Bulgarian Olympic Committee

in Tokyo
- Competitors: 63 in 9 sports
- Flag bearer: Enyu Valchev
- Medals Ranked 11th: Gold 3 Silver 5 Bronze 2 Total 10

Summer Olympics appearances (overview)
- 1896; 1900–1920; 1924; 1928; 1932; 1936; 1948; 1952; 1956; 1960; 1964; 1968; 1972; 1976; 1980; 1984; 1988; 1992; 1996; 2000; 2004; 2008; 2012; 2016; 2020; 2024; 2028

Bulgaria competed at the 1964 Summer Olympics in Tokyo, Japan. 63 competitors, 56 men and 7 women, took part in 56 events in 9 sports.

== Medalists ==
Medal	Name	Sport	Event	Date
Gold	Enyu Valchev	Wrestling	Men's freestyle lightweight	14 October
Gold	Prodan Gardzhev	Wrestling	Men's freestyle middleweight	14 October
Gold	Boyan Radev	Wrestling	Men's Greco-Roman light heavyweight	19 October
Silver	Stancho Kolev	Wrestling	Men's freestyle featherweight	14 October
Silver	Angel Kerezov	Wrestling	Men's Greco-Roman flyweight	19 October
Silver	Kiril Petkov	Wrestling	Men's Greco-Roman welterweight	19 October
Silver	Velichko Velichkov	Shooting	Men's 50 metre rifle three positions	20 October
Silver	Lyutvi Ahmedov	Wrestling	Men's freestyle heavyweight	14 October
Bronze	Said Mustafov	Wrestling	Men's freestyle light heavyweight	13 October
Bronze	Aleksandar Nikolov	Boxing	Men's light heavyweight	21 October

== Athletics ==
Key

- Note–Ranks given for track events are within the athlete's heat only
- Q = Qualified for the next round

Men
Track & road events

Athlete	Event	Heat		Semifinal		Final	
Athlete	Event	Result	Rank	Result	Rank	Result	Rank
Nicola Dimitrov Dagorov	400 m hurdles	DNS		Did not advance			

Field events

Athlete	Event	Qualification		Final	
Athlete	Event	Result	Rank	Result	Rank
Raycho Tsonev	Long jump	7.33	17	Did not advance	
Georgi Stoykovski	Triple jump	16.21	4 Q	16.10	7
Lyuben Gurgushinov	Triple jump	14.75	27	Did not advance	
Evgeni Yordanov	High jump	2.06	12 Q	2.06	12
Dimitar Khlebarov	Pole vault	No mark		Did not advance	
Valko Kostov	Discus throw	DNS		Did not advance	

Women
Track & road events

Athlete	Event	Heat		Semifinal		Final	
Athlete	Event	Result	Rank	Result	Rank	Result	Rank
Snejana Kerkova	80 m hurdles	11.5	4	11.4	8	Did not advance	

Field events

Athlete	Event	Qualification		Final	
Athlete	Event	Result	Rank	Result	Rank
Diana Jorgova	Long jump	6.11 metres	11	6.24 metres	6
Ivanka Khristova	Shot put	15.24	10	15.69	10
Virzhiniya Mikhaylova	Discus throw	54.94	1	56.70	4

== Canoeing ==
=== Sprint ===
Men

Athlete	Event	Heats		Repechages		Semifinals		Final	
Athlete	Event	Time	Rank	Time	Rank	Time	Rank	Time	Rank
Bogdan Ivanov	C-1 1000 m	4:48.39	3 Q	—N/a		BYE		4:44.76	6
Georgi Todorov	K-1 1000 m	DNS		Did not advance					

Women

Athlete	Event	Heats		Repechages		Semifinals		Final	
Athlete	Event	Time	Rank	Time	Rank	Time	Rank	Time	Rank
Nikolina Ruseva	K-1 500 m	2:13.26	4 Q	—N/a		2:15.49	4	Did not advance	

== Cycling ==
One cyclist represented Bulgaria in 1964. Stefan Kirev from Kazanlak.

=== Track ===
1000m time trial

Athlete	Event	Time	Rank
Stefan Kirev	Men's 1000m time trial	1:13.06	15

== Gymnastics ==
- Nikola Prodanov, Velik Kapsazov, Georgi Adamov, Todor Kondev, Todor Bachvarov (Note: sometimes transliterated as Batchvarov; also competed in the 1960 Summer Olympics), Lyuben Hristov

== Shooting ==
Four shooters represented Bulgaria in 1964. Velichko Velichkov won the silver medal in the 50 m rifle, three positions event.

Men

Athlete	Event	Final	
Athlete	Event	Score	Rank
Dencho Denev	50 m pistol	543	15
Dencho Denev	25 m rapid fire pistol	582	18
Martsel Koen	50 m rifle three positions	1130	23
Martsel Koen	50 m rifle prone	589	25
Todor Kozlovski	50 m pistol	540	23
Velichko Velichkov	50 m rifle three positions	1152	Silver medal
Velichko Velichkov	50 m rifle prone	592	10

== Volleyball ==
=== Men ===
==== Round robin ====
Pos	Team	Pld	W	L	Pts	SW	SL	SR	SPW	SPL	SPR
1	Soviet Union	9	8	1	17	25	5	5.000	415	279	1.487
2	Czechoslovakia	9	8	1	17	26	10	2.600	486	399	1.218
3	Japan	9	7	2	16	22	12	1.833	475	372	1.277
4	Romania	9	6	3	15	19	15	1.267	432	394	1.096
5	Bulgaria	9	5	4	14	20	16	1.250	464	429	1.082
6	Hungary	9	4	5	13	18	18	1.000	449	466	0.964
7	Brazil	9	3	6	12	13	23	0.565	410	474	0.865
8	Netherlands	9	2	7	11	11	24	0.458	378	482	0.784
9	United States	9	2	7	11	10	23	0.435	360	450	0.800
10	South Korea	9	0	9	9	9	27	0.333	376	500	0.752

Date		Score		Set 1	Set 2	Set 3	Set 4	Set 5	Total
13 Oct	Bulgaria	3–0	Brazil	16–14	15–10	15–6			46–30
14 Oct	Czechoslovakia	3–2	Bulgaria	15–13	13–15	15–11	7–15	15–11	65–65
15 Oct	Romania	3–2	Bulgaria	15–6	11–15	5–15	15–13	15–8	61–57
17 Oct	Japan	3–1	Bulgaria	15–10	12–15	15–6	15–10		57–41
18 Oct	Bulgaria	3–2	Netherlands	15–11	8–15	15–8	14–16	15–8	67–58
19 Oct	Bulgaria	3–0	United States	15–9	15–13	15–7			45–29
21 Oct	Bulgaria	3–1	South Korea	15–4	12–15	15–11	15–9		57–39
22 Oct	Soviet Union	3–0	Bulgaria	15–2	16–14	15–13			46–29
23 Oct	Bulgaria	3–1	Hungary	15–9	15–12	12–15	15–8		57–44

==== Team roster ====
- Dimitar Karov
- Ivan Gochev
- Gergi Konstandinov
- Petko Panteleev
- Peter Kruchmarov
- Simeon Srandev
- Lachezar Stoyanov
- Boris Gyuderov
- Kiril Ivanov
- Slavko Slavov
- Georgi Spasov
- Angel Koritarov

== Weightlifting ==
Men

Athlete	Event	Military press		Snatch		Clean & Jerk		Total	Rank
Athlete	Event	Result	Rank	Result	Rank	Result	Rank	Total	Rank
Bogomil Cvetanov	67,5 kg	125	7	107.5	13	125	19	357.5	15
Weliko Konarov	75 kg	130	7	130	5	155	13	415	8
Stancho Penchev	82.5 kg	135	10	130	12	160	14	425	11
Petar Tachev	90 kg	145	8	130	11	170	10	445	8
Ivan Veselinov	+90 kg	165	7	135	11	190	4	490	7
