= Wrestling at the 1964 Summer Olympics – Men's freestyle light heavyweight =

Wrestling at the Olympics

Men's freestyle light heavyweight at the Games of the XVIII Olympiad
- Venue: Komazawa Gymnasium
- Dates: 11–14 October 1964
- Competitors: 16 from 16 nations

Medalists
1st place, gold medalist(s)		Aleksandr Medved	Soviet Union
2nd place, silver medalist(s)		Ahmet Ayık	Turkey
3rd place, bronze medalist(s)		Said Mustafov	Bulgaria

The men's freestyle light heavyweight competition at the 1964 Summer Olympics in Tokyo took place from 11 to 14 October at the Komazawa Gymnasium. Nations were limited to one competitor. Light heavyweight was the second-heaviest category, including wrestlers weighing 87 to 97 kilograms (191.8 to 213.8 lb).

== Competition format ==
This freestyle wrestling competition continued to use the "bad points" elimination system introduced at the 1928 Summer Olympics for Greco-Roman and at the 1932 Summer Olympics for freestyle wrestling, as adjusted at the 1960 Summer Olympics. Each bout awarded 4 points. If the victory was by fall, the winner received 0 and the loser 4. If the victory was by decision, the winner received 1 and the loser 3. If the bout was tied, each wrestler received 2 points. A wrestler who accumulated 6 or more points was eliminated. Rounds continued until there were 3 or fewer uneliminated wrestlers. If only 1 wrestler remained, he received the gold medal. If 2 wrestlers remained, point totals were ignored and they faced each other for gold and silver (if they had already wrestled each other, that result was used). If 3 wrestlers remained, point totals were ignored and a round-robin was held among those 3 to determine medals (with previous head-to-head results, if any, counting for this round-robin).

== Results ==
=== Round 1 ===
Bouts

Winner	Nation	Victory Type	Loser	Nation
Peter Jutzeler	Switzerland	Decision	Maruti Mane	India
Heinz Kiehl	United Team of Germany	Fall	Ölziisaikhany Erdene-Ochir	Mongolia
Gholam Reza Takhti	Iran	Decision	Imre Vígh	Hungary
Shunichi Kawano	Japan	Decision	Tony Buck	Great Britain
Hugh Williams	Australia	Decision	Sión Cóhen	Panama
Said Mustafov	Bulgaria	Tie	Ahmet Ayık	Turkey
Aleksandr Medved	Soviet Union	Fall	Francisc Balla	Romania
Jerry Conine	United States	Decision	Lennart Eriksson	Sweden

Points

Rank	Wrestler	Nation	R1
1	Heinz Kiehl	United Team of Germany	0
1	Aleksandr Medved	Soviet Union	0
3	Jerry Conine	United States	1
3	Peter Jutzeler	Switzerland	1
3	Shunichi Kawano	Japan	1
3	Gholam Reza Takhti	Iran	1
3	Hugh Williams	Australia	1
8	Ahmet Ayık	Turkey	2
8	Said Mustafov	Bulgaria	2
10	Tony Buck	Great Britain	3
10	Sión Cóhen	Panama	3
10	Lennart Eriksson	Sweden	3
10	Maruti Mane	India	3
10	Imre Vígh	Hungary	3
13	Francisc Balla	Romania	4
13	Ölziisaikhany Erdene-Ochir	Mongolia	4

=== Round 2 ===
Five wrestlers were eliminated; 11 remained. Three had 1 point.

Bouts

Winner	Nation	Victory Type	Loser	Nation
Peter Jutzeler	Switzerland	Fall	Ölziisaikhany Erdene-Ochir	Mongolia
Maruti Mane	India	Decision	Heinz Kiehl	United Team of Germany
Gholam Reza Takhti	Iran	Fall	Tony Buck	Great Britain
Imre Vígh	Hungary	Tie	Shunichi Kawano	Japan
Said Mustafov	Bulgaria	Fall	Sión Cóhen	Panama
Ahmet Ayık	Turkey	Fall	Hugh Williams	Australia
Aleksandr Medved	Soviet Union	Decision	Lennart Eriksson	Sweden
Francisc Balla	Romania	Tie	Jerry Conine	United States

Points

Rank	Wrestler	Nation	R1	R2	Total
1	Peter Jutzeler	Switzerland	1	0	1
1	Aleksandr Medved	Soviet Union	0	1	1
1	Gholam Reza Takhti	Iran	1	0	1
4	Ahmet Ayık	Turkey	2	0	2
4	Said Mustafov	Bulgaria	2	0	2
6	Jerry Conine	United States	1	2	3
6	Shunichi Kawano	Japan	1	2	3
6	Heinz Kiehl	United Team of Germany	0	3	3
9	Maruti Mane	India	3	1	4
10	Imre Vígh	Hungary	3	2	5
10	Hugh Williams	Australia	1	4	5
12	Francisc Balla	Romania	4	2	6
12	Lennart Eriksson	Sweden	3	3	6
14	Tony Buck	Great Britain	3	4	7
14	Sión Cóhen	Panama	3	4	7
16	Ölziisaikhany Erdene-Ochir	Mongolia	4	4	8

=== Round 3 ===
Four wrestlers were eliminated, leaving 7 to continue. Takhti took sole possession of the lead, staying at 1 point.

Bouts

Winner	Nation	Victory Type	Loser	Nation
Heinz Kiehl	United Team of Germany	Decision	Peter Jutzeler	Switzerland
Imre Vígh	Hungary	Decision	Maruti Mane	India
Gholam Reza Takhti	Iran	Fall	Shunichi Kawano	Japan
Said Mustafov	Bulgaria	Fall	Hugh Williams	Australia
Ahmet Ayık	Turkey	Tie	Aleksandr Medved	Soviet Union
Jerry Conine	United States	Bye	N/A	N/A

Points

Rank	Wrestler	Nation	R1	R2	R3	Total
1	Gholam Reza Takhti	Iran	1	0	0	1
2	Said Mustafov	Bulgaria	2	0	0	2
3	Jerry Conine	United States	1	2	0	3
3	Aleksandr Medved	Soviet Union	0	1	2	3
5	Ahmet Ayık	Turkey	2	0	2	4
5	Peter Jutzeler	Switzerland	1	0	3	4
5	Heinz Kiehl	United Team of Germany	0	3	1	4
8	Imre Vígh	Hungary	3	2	1	6
9	Shunichi Kawano	Japan	1	2	4	7
9	Maruti Mane	India	3	1	3	7
11	Hugh Williams	Australia	1	4	4	9

=== Round 4 ===
Only two wrestlers were eliminated in this round. Each of the remaining 5 had at least 3 points.

Bouts

Winner	Nation	Victory Type	Loser	Nation
Peter Jutzeler	Switzerland	Decision	Jerry Conine	United States
Said Mustafov	Bulgaria	Decision	Heinz Kiehl	United Team of Germany
Ahmet Ayık	Turkey	Decision	Gholam Reza Takhti	Iran
Aleksandr Medved	Soviet Union	Bye	N/A	N/A

Points

Rank	Wrestler	Nation	R1	R2	R3	R4	Total
1	Aleksandr Medved	Soviet Union	0	1	2	0	3
1	Said Mustafov	Bulgaria	2	0	0	1	3
3	Gholam Reza Takhti	Iran	1	0	0	3	4
4	Ahmet Ayık	Turkey	2	0	2	1	5
4	Peter Jutzeler	Switzerland	1	0	3	1	5
6	Jerry Conine	United States	1	2	0	3	6
7	Heinz Kiehl	United Team of Germany	0	3	1	3	7

=== Round 5 ===
Ayık advanced to the final round with a bye; the two bouts in round 5 would eliminate at least 2 and possibly 3 other wrestlers. Medved defeated Jutzeler to eliminate the latter wrestler. The draw between Takhti and Mustafov resulted in only Takhti's elimination; Mustafov had started with 3 points and the tie placed him at 5, not enough for elimination.

Bouts

Winner	Nation	Victory Type	Loser	Nation
Aleksandr Medved	Soviet Union	Fall	Peter Jutzeler	Switzerland
Gholam Reza Takhti	Iran	Tie	Said Mustafov	Bulgaria
Ahmet Ayık	Turkey	Bye	N/A	N/A

Points

Rank	Wrestler	Nation	R1	R2	R3	R4	R5	Total
1	Aleksandr Medved	Soviet Union	0	1	2	0	0	3
2	Ahmet Ayık	Turkey	2	0	2	1	0	5
2	Said Mustafov	Bulgaria	2	0	0	1	2	5
4	Gholam Reza Takhti	Iran	1	0	0	3	2	6
5	Peter Jutzeler	Switzerland	1	0	3	1	4	9

=== Final round ===
Ayık's draws against Mustafov (in round 1) and Medved (in round 3) counted for the final round. The only bout left between the medalists was Medved against Mustafov; the winner would take gold and the loser bronze. Medved pinned Mustafov in 39 seconds.

Bouts

Winner	Nation	Victory Type	Loser	Nation
Said Mustafov	Bulgaria	Tie (Round 1)	Ahmet Ayık	Turkey
Ahmet Ayık	Turkey	Tie (Round 3)	Aleksandr Medved	Soviet Union
Aleksandr Medved	Soviet Union	Fall	Said Mustafov	Bulgaria

Points

Rank	Wrestler	Nation	Points
1st place, gold medalist(s)	Aleksandr Medved	Soviet Union	2
2nd place, silver medalist(s)	Ahmet Ayık	Turkey	4
3rd place, bronze medalist(s)	Said Mustafov	Bulgaria	6
