= Wrestling at the 1968 Summer Olympics – Men's Greco-Roman 97 kg =

Men's Greco-Roman 97 kg events at the Olympics

Men's Greco-Roman 97 kg at the Games of the XIX Olympiad
- Venue: Insurgentes Ice Rink
- Dates: 23–26 October 1968
- Competitors: 16 from 16 nations

Medalists
1st place, gold medalist(s)		Boyan Radev	Bulgaria
2nd place, silver medalist(s)		Nikolay Yakovenko	Soviet Union
3rd place, bronze medalist(s)		Nicolae Martinescu	Romania

The Men's Greco-Roman Light-Heavyweight at the 1968 Summer Olympics as part of the wrestling program were held at the Insurgentes Ice Rink. The weight class allowed wrestlers which are up to 97 kilograms to compete.

== Results ==
The following wrestlers took part in the event:

Rank	Name	Country
1	Boyan Radev	Bulgaria
2	Nikolay Yakovenko	Soviet Union
3	Nicolae Martinescu	Romania
4	Per Svensson	Sweden
5	Tore Hem	Norway
6T	Caj Malmberg	Finland
6T	Wacław Orłowski	Poland
6T	Peter Jutzeler	Switzerland
AC	Takeshi Nagao	Japan
AC	Ferenc Kiss	Hungary
AC	Daniel Verník	Argentina
AC	Henk Schenk	United States
AC	Jürgen Klinge	East Germany
AC	Heinz Kiehl	West Germany
AC	Ed Millard	Canada
AC	Gürbüz Lü	Turkey
