= Wrestling at the 1964 Summer Olympics =

Coordinates: 35.6248°N 139.6608°E

Wrestling at the Games of the XVIII Olympiad
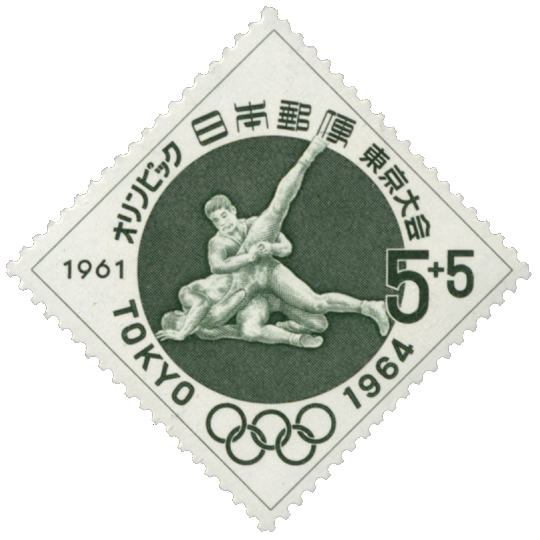
- Wrestling at the 1964 Olympics on a stamp of Japan.
- Venue: Komazawa Gymnasium
- Dates: 11 – 19 October
- Competitors: 275 from 42 nations

At the 1964 Summer Olympics, 16 wrestling events were contested, for all men. There were eight weight classes in Greco-Roman wrestling and eight classes in freestyle wrestling.

== Medal table ==
Rank	Nation	Gold	Silver	Bronze	Total
1	Japan	5	0	1	6
2	Soviet Union	3	4	3	10
3	Bulgaria	3	4	1	8
4	Turkey	2	3	1	6
5	Hungary	2	0	0	2
6	Yugoslavia	1	0	1	2
7	United Team of Germany	0	1	3	4
8	Romania	0	1	2	3
9	Sweden	0	1	1	2
10	Czechoslovakia	0	1	0	1
10	South Korea	0	1	0	1
12	Iran	0	0	2	2
13	United States	0	0	1	1
Totals (13 entries)		16	16	16	48

== Medal summary ==
=== Greco-Roman ===
Games	Gold	Silver	Bronze
Flyweight	Tsutomu Hanahara; Japan	Angel Kerezov; Bulgaria	Dumitru Pârvulescu; Romania
Bantamweight	Masamitsu Ichiguchi; Japan	Vladlen Trostyansky; Soviet Union	Ion Cernea; Romania
Featherweight	Imre Polyák; Hungary	Roman Rurua; Soviet Union	Branislav Martinović; Yugoslavia
Lightweight	Kazım Ayvaz; Turkey	Valeriu Bularca; Romania	David Gvantseladze; Soviet Union
Welterweight	Anatoly Kolesov; Soviet Union	Kiril Petkov; Bulgaria	Bertil Nyström; Sweden
Middleweight	Branislav Simić; Yugoslavia	Jiří Kormaník; Czechoslovakia	Lothar Metz; United Team of Germany
Light Heavyweight	Boyan Radev; Bulgaria	Per Svensson; Sweden	Heinz Kiehl; United Team of Germany
Heavyweight	István Kozma; Hungary	Anatoly Roshchin; Soviet Union	Wilfried Dietrich; United Team of Germany

=== Freestyle ===
Games	Gold	Silver	Bronze
Flyweight	Yoshikatsu Yoshida; Japan	Chang Chang-Sun; South Korea	Ali Akbar Heidari; Iran
Bantamweight	Yojiro Uetake; Japan	Hüseyin Akbas; Turkey	Aydin Ibrahimov; Soviet Union
Featherweight	Osamu Watanabe; Japan	Stancho Kolev; Bulgaria	Nodar Khokhashvili; Soviet Union
Lightweight	Enyu Valchev; Bulgaria	Klaus Rost; United Team of Germany	Iwao Horiuchi; Japan
Welterweight	İsmail Ogan; Turkey	Guliko Sagaradze; Soviet Union	Mohammad Ali Sanatkaran; Iran
Middleweight	Prodan Gardzhev; Bulgaria	Hasan Güngör; Turkey	Daniel Brand; United States
Light Heavyweight	Aleksandr Medved; Soviet Union	Ahmet Ayık; Turkey	Said Mustafov; Bulgaria
Heavyweight	Aleksandr Ivanitsky; Soviet Union	Lyutvi Ahmedov; Bulgaria	Hamit Kaplan; Turkey

== Participating nations ==
A total of 275 wrestlers from 42 nations competed at the Tokyo Games:

- Afghanistan (8)
- Argentina (4)
- Australia (8)
- Austria (4)
- Belgium (3)
- Bulgaria (16)
- Canada (4)
- Czechoslovakia (4)
- Denmark (3)
- Egypt (4)
- Finland (10)
- France (3)
- United Team of Germany (14)
- Great Britain (6)
- Greece (5)
- Hungary (10)
- India (8)
- Iran (12)
- Ireland (2)
- Italy (5)
- Japan (16)
- South Korea (13)
- Luxembourg (1)
- Mexico (4)
- Mongolia (8)
- New Zealand (2)
- Norway (1)
- Pakistan (6)
- Panama (3)
- Philippines (4)
- Poland (5)
- Romania (10)
- Soviet Union (16)
- Spain (1)
- Sweden (9)
- Switzerland (3)
- Turkey (15)
- United States (16)
- Yugoslavia (4)

== See also ==
- List of World and Olympic Champions in men's freestyle wrestling
- List of World and Olympic Champions in Greco-Roman wrestling
