= Wrestling at the 1976 Summer Olympics – Men's Greco-Roman 100 kg =

Men's Greco-Roman 100 kg at the Games of the XXI Olympiad
- Venue: Maurice Richard Arena
- Dates: 20–24 July 1976
- Competitors: 13 from 13 nations

Medalists
1st place, gold medalist(s)		Nikolai Balboshin	Soviet Union
2nd place, silver medalist(s)		Kamen Goranov	Bulgaria
3rd place, bronze medalist(s)		Andrzej Skrzydlewski	Poland

The Men's Greco-Roman 100 kg at the 1976 Summer Olympics as part of the wrestling program were held at the Maurice Richard Arena.

== Medalists ==
Gold	Nikolai Balboshin; Soviet Union
Silver	Kamen Goranov; Bulgaria
Bronze	Andrzej Skrzydlewski; Poland

== Tournament results ==
The competition used a form of negative points tournament, with negative points given for any result short of a fall. Accumulation of 6 negative points eliminated the loser wrestler. When only three wrestlers remain, a special final round is used to determine the order of the medals.

Legend

- TF — Won by Fall
- IN — Won by Opponent Injury
- DQ — Won by Passivity
- D1 — Won by Passivity, the winner is passive too
- D2 — Both wrestlers lost by Passivity
- FF — Won by Forfeit
- DNA — Did not appear
- TPP — Total penalty points
- MPP — Match penalty points

Penalties

- 0 — Won by Fall, Technical Superiority, Passivity, Injury and Forfeit
- 0.5 — Won by Points, 8-11 points difference
- 1 — Won by Points, 1-7 points difference
- 2 — Won by Passivity, the winner is passive too
- 3 — Lost by Points, 1-7 points difference
- 3.5 — Lost by Points, 8-11 points difference
- 4 — Lost by Fall, Technical Superiority, Passivity, Injury and Forfeit

=== Round 1 ===
TPP	MPP		Score		MPP	TPP
0	0	Andrzej Skrzydlewski (POL)	TF / 2:24	Bahram Moshtaghi (IRI)	4	4
1	1	Brad Rheingans (USA)	4 - 3	Tore Hem (NOR)	3	3
4	4	Yasunari Akiyama (JPN)	DQ / 8:53	Fredi Albrecht (GDR)	0	0
0	0	József Farkas (HUN)	TF / 2:24	Robert N'Diaye (SEN)	4	4
4	4	Nicolae Martinescu (ROU)	TF / 1:23	Nikolai Balboshin (URS)	0	0
0	0	Kamen Goranov (BUL)	TF / 1:52	Heinz Schäfer (FRG)	4	4
0		Daniel Verník (ARG)		Bye		

=== Round 2 ===
TPP	MPP		Score		MPP	TPP
4	4	Daniel Verník (ARG)	TF / 1:17	Andrzej Skrzydlewski (POL)	0	0
8	4	Bahram Moshtaghi (IRI)	TF / 0:34	Brad Rheingans (USA)	0	1
3	0	Tore Hem (NOR)	TF / 5:40	Yasunari Akiyama (JPN)	4	8
4	4	Fredi Albrecht (GDR)	D2 / 8:00	József Farkas (HUN)	4	4
8	4	Robert N'Diaye (SEN)	TF / 2:18	Nicolae Martinescu (ROU)	0	4
0	0	Nikolai Balboshin (URS)	DQ / 5:51	Kamen Goranov (BUL)	4	4
4		Heinz Schäfer (FRG)		Bye		

=== Round 3 ===
TPP	MPP		Score		MPP	TPP
4	0	Heinz Schäfer (FRG)	TF / 1:57	Daniel Verník (ARG)	4	8
3	3	Andrzej Skrzydlewski (POL)	7 - 9	Brad Rheingans (USA)	1	2
3	0	Tore Hem (NOR)	DQ / 8:56	Fredi Albrecht (GDR)	4	8
8	4	József Farkas (HUN)	TF / 3:32	Nikolai Balboshin (URS)	0	0
8	4	Nicolae Martinescu (ROU)	TF / 5:51	Kamen Goranov (BUL)	0	4

=== Round 4 ===
TPP	MPP		Score		MPP	TPP
8	4	Heinz Schäfer (FRG)	TF / 2:59	Andrzej Skrzydlewski (POL)	0	3
6	4	Brad Rheingans (USA)	TF / 3:58	Nikolai Balboshin (URS)	0	0
7	4	Tore Hem (NOR)	TF / 1:14	Kamen Goranov (BUL)	0	4

=== Final ===
Results from the preliminary round are carried forward into the final (shown in yellow).

TPP	MPP		Score		MPP	TPP
	0	Nikolai Balboshin (URS)	DQ / 5:51	Kamen Goranov (BUL)	4	
	4	Andrzej Skrzydlewski (POL)	TF / 2:04	Nikolai Balboshin (URS)	0	0
5	1	Kamen Goranov (BUL)	6 - 2	Andrzej Skrzydlewski (POL)	3	7

== Final standings ==
1. Nikolai Balboshin (URS)
2. Kamen Goranov (BUL)
3. Andrzej Skrzydlewski (POL)
4. Brad Rheingans (USA)
5. Tore Hem (NOR)
6. Heinz Schäfer (FRG)
7. József Farkas (HUN) and Nicolae Martinescu (ROU)
