= 1969 European Wrestling Championships =

- Host city: Bulgaria, Sofia(Freestyle); Italy Modena(Greco-Roman)
- Dates: 19 - 23 September 1969; 5 – 9 June 1969

Champions
- Freestyle: Soviet Union
- Greco-Roman: Yugoslavia

The 1969 European Wrestling Championships were held in the men's Freestyle style in Sofia Bulgaria 19 - 23 September 1969; the Greco-Romane style in Modena Italy 5 – 9 June 1969.

== Medal table ==
Rank	Nation	Gold	Silver	Bronze	Total
1	Soviet Union	6	3	1	10
2	Bulgaria	4	3	1	8
3	Yugoslavia	4	2	0	6
4	Turkey	2	2	4	8
5	Finland	2	1	1	4
6	Sweden	1	2	4	7
7	West Germany	1	1	3	5
8	Romania	0	2	1	3
9	Italy	0	1	3	4
10	East Germany	0	1	1	2
11	Hungary	0	1	0	1
11	Norway	0	1	0	1
13	Czechoslovakia	0	0	1	1
Totals (13 entries)		20	20	20	60

== Medal summary ==
=== Men's freestyle ===
Event	Gold	Silver	Bronze
48 kg	Roman Dmitriyev; Soviet Union	Ognyan Nikolov; Bulgaria	Sefer Baygın; Turkey
52 kg	Bayu Baev; Bulgaria	Aminula Nasrulayev; Soviet Union	Petre Ciarnău; Romania
57 kg	Yancho Patrikov; Bulgaria	Pavel Malian; Soviet Union	Mehmet Esenceli; Turkey
62 kg	Enyu Todorov; Bulgaria	Petre Coman; Romania	Zagalav Abdulbekov; Soviet Union
68 kg	Enyu Valchev; Bulgaria	Nodar Khokhashvili; Soviet Union	Josef Engel; Czechoslovakia
74 kg	Yuri Gusov; Soviet Union	Wolfgang Nitschke; East Germany	Adolf Seger; West Germany
82 kg	Yuri Shajmuradov; Soviet Union	Károly Bajkó; Hungary	Ivan Iliev; Bulgaria
90 kg	Gennady Strakhov; Soviet Union	Attila Balogh; Romania	Roland Andersson; Sweden
100 kg	Vladimir Guliutkin; Soviet Union	Vasil Todorov; Bulgaria	Peter Germer; East Germany
+100 kg	Shota Lomidze; Soviet Union	Osman Duraliev; Bulgaria	Ömer Topuz; Turkey

=== Men's Greco-Roman ===
Event	Gold	Silver	Bronze
48 kg	Rolf Lacour; West Germany	Lorenzo Calafiore; Italy	Muzaffer Can; Turkey
52 kg	Boško Marinko; Yugoslavia	Şefik Namlı; Turkey	Fritz Huber; West Germany
57 kg	Risto Björlin; Finland	Karlo Čović; Yugoslavia	Giuseppe Bognanni; Italy
62 kg	Metin Alakoç; Turkey	Werner Hettich; West Germany	Michele Toma; Italy
68 kg	Sreten Damjanović; Yugoslavia	Vahap Pehlivan; Turkey	Matti Poikala; Sweden
74 kg	Eero Tapio; Finland	Momir Kecman; Yugoslavia	Jan Karlsson; Sweden
82 kg	Milan Nenadić; Yugoslavia	Jan Kårström; Sweden	Martti Laakso; Finland
90 kg	Josip Čorak; Yugoslavia	Tore Hem; Norway	Roland Andersson; Sweden
100 kg	Pelle Svensson; Sweden	Aimo Mäenpää; Finland	Alfons Hecher; West Germany
+100 kg	Ömer Topuz; Turkey	Arne Robertsson; Sweden	Giuseppe Marcucci; Italy
