= 1968 European Wrestling Championships =

- Host city: (Socialist Federal Republic of Yugoslavia) Yugoslavia, Skopje Freestyle; Sweden, Västerås Greco-Roman
- Dates: 02 – 04 July 1968; 14 – 16 June 1968

Champions
- Freestyle: Bulgaria
- Greco-Roman: Soviet Union

The 1968 European Wrestling Championships were held in the Greco-Romane style and in Västerås 14 – 16 June 1968; the men's Freestyle style in Skopje 02 – 04 July 1968.

== Medal table ==
Rank	Nation	Gold	Silver	Bronze	Total
1	Soviet Union	8	1	2	11
2	Bulgaria	4	7	0	11
3	Hungary	1	3	2	6
4	Czechoslovakia	1	1	1	3
5	Turkey	1	0	2	3
6	France	1	0	0	1
7	Sweden	0	1	3	4
8	Romania	0	1	1	2
9	West Germany	0	1	0	1
9	Yugoslavia	0	1	0	1
11	Finland	0	0	2	2
11	Poland	0	0	2	2
13	East Germany	0	0	1	1
Totals (13 entries)		16	16	16	48

== Medal summary ==
=== Men's freestyle ===
Event	Gold	Silver	Bronze
52 kg	Bayu Baev; Bulgaria	Paul Neff; West Germany	Mehmet Esenceli; Turkey
57 kg	Ali Aliyev; Soviet Union	Ivan Shavov; Bulgaria	Zbigniew Żedzicki; Poland
63 kg	Enyu Todorov; Bulgaria	Petre Coman; Romania	Jürgen Luczak; East Germany
70 kg	Enyu Valchev; Bulgaria	Yuri Gusov; Soviet Union	Jan Karlsson; Sweden
78 kg	Daniel Robin; France	Károly Bajkó; Hungary	Guram Sagaradze; Soviet Union
87 kg	Andrei Tsjovrebov; Soviet Union	Prodan Gardzhev; Bulgaria	Francisc Balla; Romania
97 kg	Vladimir Gulyutkin; Soviet Union	Vasil Todorov; Bulgaria	Ryszard Długosz; Poland
97+ kg	Aleksandr Medved; Soviet Union	Osman Duraliev; Bulgaria	László Nyers; Hungary

=== Men's Greco-Roman ===
Event	Gold	Silver	Bronze
52 kg	Ivan Kochergin; Soviet Union	Petar Kirov; Bulgaria	Jussi Vesterinen; Finland
57 kg	Khristo Traykov; Bulgaria	János Varga; Hungary	Risto Björlin; Finland
63 kg	Yuri Grigoriev; Soviet Union	Jiří Švec; Czechoslovakia	İlhan Topsakal; Turkey
70 kg	Vladimir Novokhatko; Soviet Union	Matti Poikala; Sweden	Antal Steer; Hungary
78 kg	Sırrı Acar; Turkey	Milan Nenadić; Yugoslavia	Vladislav Ivlev; Soviet Union
87 kg	Omar Bliadze; Soviet Union	Petar Krumov; Bulgaria	Jiří Kormaník; Czechoslovakia
97 kg	Ferenc Kiss; Hungary	Boyan Radev; Bulgaria	Pelle Svensson; Sweden
97+ kg	Petr Kment; Czechoslovakia	István Kozma; Hungary	Ragnar Svensson; Sweden
