= Wrestling at the 1980 Summer Olympics – Men's Greco-Roman +100 kg =

Men's Greco-Roman +100 kg at the Games of the XXII Olympiad
- Venue: Central Sports Club of the Army
- Dates: 22–24 July 1980
- Competitors: 9 from 9 nations

Medalists
1st place, gold medalist(s)		Alexander Kolchinsky	Soviet Union
2nd place, silver medalist(s)		Aleksandar Tomov	Bulgaria
3rd place, bronze medalist(s)		Hassan Bechara	Lebanon

The Men's Greco-Roman +100 kg at the 1980 Summer Olympics as part of the wrestling program were held at the Athletics Fieldhouse, Central Sports Club of the Army.

== Medalists ==
Gold	Alexander Kolchinsky; Soviet Union
Silver	Aleksandar Tomov; Bulgaria
Bronze	Hassan Bechara; Lebanon

== Tournament results ==
The competition used a form of negative points tournament, with negative points given for any result short of a fall. Accumulation of 6 negative points eliminated the loser wrestler. When only three wrestlers remain, a special final round is used to determine the order of the medals.

Legend

- TF — Won by Fall
- IN — Won by Opponent Injury
- DQ — Won by Passivity
- D1 — Won by Passivity, the winner is passive too
- D2 — Both wrestlers lost by Passivity
- FF — Won by Forfeit
- DNA — Did not appear
- TPP — Total penalty points
- MPP — Match penalty points

Penalties

- 0 — Won by Fall, Technical Superiority, Passivity, Injury and Forfeit
- 0.5 — Won by Points, 8-11 points difference
- 1 — Won by Points, 1-7 points difference
- 2 — Won by Passivity, the winner is passive too
- 3 — Lost by Points, 1-7 points difference
- 3.5 — Lost by Points, 8-11 points difference
- 4 — Lost by Fall, Technical Superiority, Passivity, Injury and Forfeit

=== Round 1 ===
TPP	MPP		Score		MPP	TPP
4	4	Prvoslav Ilić (YUG)	DQ / 3:57	Aleksandar Tomov (BUL)	0	0
4	4	Jawdat Jabra (SYR)	TF / 2:44	József Farkas (HUN)	0	0
4	4	Roman Codreanu (ROU)	DQ / 7:50	Alexander Kolchinsky (URS)	0	0
4	4	Marek Galiński (POL)	D2 / 7:02	Arturo Díaz (CUB)	4	4
4	4	Antonio La Penna (ITA)	TF / 6:57	Hassan Bechara (LIB)	0	0

=== Round 2 ===
TPP	MPP		Score		MPP	TPP
4	0	Prvoslav Ilić (YUG)	DQ / 0:26	Jawdat Jabrah (SYR)	4	8
0	0	Aleksandar Tomov (BUL)	DQ / 5:16	József Farkas (HUN)	4	4
4	0	Roman Codreanu (ROU)	DQ / 4:46	Marek Galiński (POL)	4	8
0	0	Alexander Kolchinsky (URS)	TF / 0:55	Antonio La Penna (ITA)	4	8
4	0	Arturo Díaz (CUB)	DQ / 4:31	Hassan Bechara (LIB)	4	4

=== Round 3 ===
TPP	MPP		Score		MPP	TPP
8	4	Prvoslav Ilić (YUG)	D1 / 7:11	József Farkas (HUN)	2	6
0	0	Aleksandar Tomov (BUL)	DQ / 7:25	Roman Codreanu (ROU)	4	8
0	0	Alexander Kolchinsky (URS)	TF / 2:09	Arturo Díaz (CUB)	4	8
4		Hassan Bechara (LIB)		Bye		

=== Round 4 ===
TPP	MPP		Score		MPP	TPP
8	4	Hassan Bechara (LIB)	TF / 0:55	Aleksandar Tomov (BUL)	0	0
10	4	József Farkas (HUN)	DQ / 6:43	Alexander Kolchinsky (URS)	0	0

=== Final ===
Results from the preliminary round are carried forward into the final (shown in yellow).

TPP	MPP		Score		MPP	TPP
	4	Hassan Bechara (LIB)	TF / 0:55	Aleksandar Tomov (BUL)	0	
8	4	Hassan Bechara (LIB)	TF / 1:40	Alexander Kolchinsky (URS)	0	
3	3	Aleksandar Tomov (BUL)	2 - 4	Alexander Kolchinsky (URS)	1	1

== Final standings ==
1. Alexander Kolchinsky (URS)
2. Aleksandar Tomov (BUL)
3. Hassan Bechara (LIB)
4. József Farkas (HUN)
5. Prvoslav Ilić (YUG)
6. Arturo Díaz (CUB)
7. Roman Codreanu (ROU)
8. Marek Galiński (POL)
