= Echaniz =

Echaniz or Echániz is a surname. Notable people with the surname include:

- Alejandro Echaniz (born 1942), Mexican wrestler
- Gustavo Pedro Echaniz (born 1955), Argentine footballer
- Iñaki Echaniz (born 1993), French politician
- José Echániz (1905–1969), Cuban-born pianist
