= Lüscher =

Lüscher is a surname mainly occurring in Switzerland. Outside German-speaking Switzerland the form Luscher may occur. Notable people with the surname include:

- Bettina Lüscher (born 1961), German journalist
- Christian Lüscher (born 1963), Swiss attorney and politician
- Christian Lüscher (neurobiologist) (born 1963), Swiss neurobiologist
- Flavia Lüscher (born 2003), Swiss footballer
- Gustav S. Luscher (1856–1943), American businessman and politician
- Henry R. Luscher, American politician
- Ingeborg Lüscher (born 1936), German-Swiss artist
- Jonas Lüscher (born 1976), Swiss-German writer and essayist
- Martin Lüscher (born 1949), Swiss theoretical physicist
- Max Lüscher (1923–2017), Swiss psychotherapist
- Peter Lüscher (born 1956), Swiss alpine ski racer
- Rudolf Lüscher (born 1945), Swiss former wrestler
- Sara Lüscher (born 1986), Swiss orienteering competitor
- Susanne Lüscher, Swiss orienteering competitor
- Sven Lüscher (born 1984), Swiss footballer
