= Hecher =

Hecher is a German surname. Notable people with the surname include:

- Alfons Hecher (born 1943), German sport wrestler
- Lorenz Hecher (born 1946), German sport wrestler
- Traudl Hecher (1943–2023), Austrian alpine skier

== See also ==
- Hecker (surname)
