= Marek Galiński =

Marek Galiński may refer to:

- Marek Galiński (cyclist) (1974–2014), Polish mountain biker
- Marek Galiński (wrestler) (1951–1999), Polish wrestler
