= Yasunari =

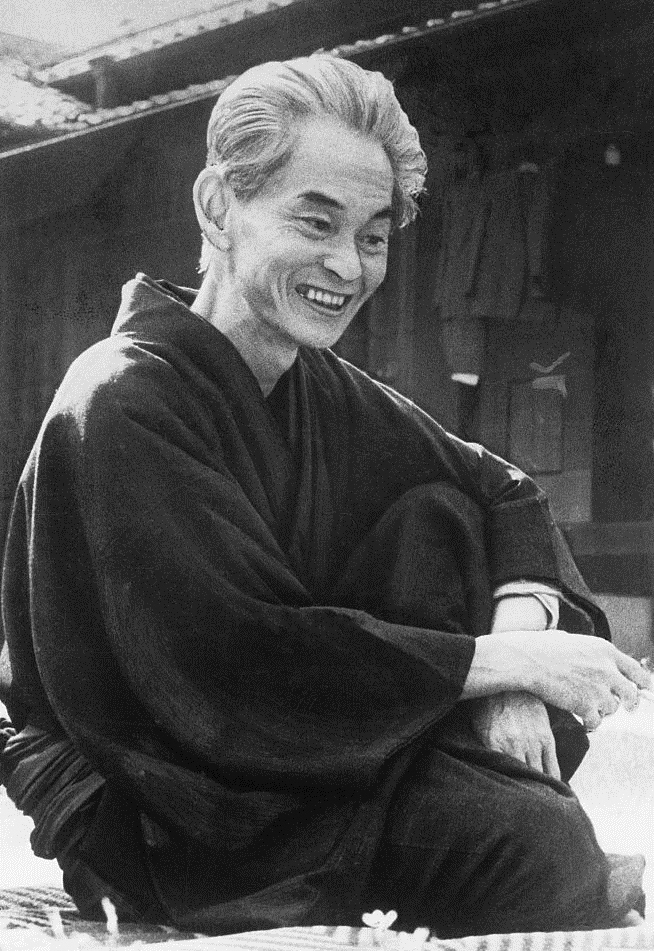
- Yasunari Kawabata (1899–1972), Japanese writer
- Pronunciation: jasɯnaɾi (IPA)
- Gender: Male

Origin
- Origin: Japanese
- Meaning: Different meanings depending on the kanji used

Yasunari is a masculine Japanese given name.

== Written forms ==
Yasunari can be written using many different combinations of kanji characters. Here are some examples:

- 靖成, "peaceful, turn into"
- 靖也, "peaceful, to be"
- 康成, "healthy, turn into"
- 康也, "healthy, to be"
- 安成, "tranquil, turn into"
- 安也, "tranquil, to be"
- 保成, "preserve, turn into"
- 保也, "preserve, to be"
- 泰成, "peaceful, turn into"
- 泰也, "peaceful, to be"
- 易成, "divination, turn into"

The name can also be written in hiragana やすなり or katakana ヤスナリ.

== Notable people with the name ==
- Yasunari Akiyama (秋山 安成; born 1948), Japanese sport wrestler
- Yasunari Hirai (平井 康翔; born 1990), Japanese swimmer
- Yasunari Hiraoka (平岡 靖成; born 1972), Japanese footballer
- Yasunari Ishimi (born 1943), a Japanese karate expert
- Yasunari Iwata (岩田 康誠; born 1974), Japanese jockey
- Yasunari Kawabata (川端 康成; 1899–1972), Japanese writer
- Yasunari Myogiryu (妙義龍 泰成; born 1986), Japanese sumo wrestler
