= Nikolay Balboshin =

Soviet Greco-Roman wrestler

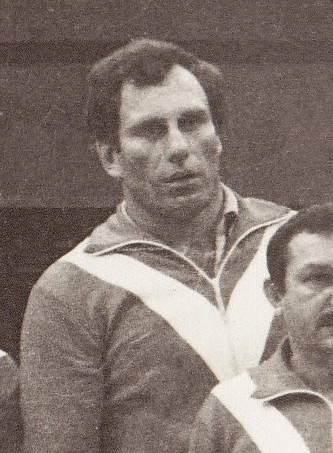

Personal information
- Born: 8 June 1949 (age 77) Potsdam, East Germany
- Height: 188 cm (6 ft 2 in)
- Weight: 100 kg (220 lb)

Sport
- Sport: Greco-Roman wrestling
- Club: Dynamo Moscow
- Coached by: Anatoly Parfyonov; Yury Kolupov
Medal record
Representing the Soviet Union
Olympic Games
Gold medal – first place	1976 Montreal	100 kg
World Championships
Gold medal – first place	1973 Tehran	100 kg
Gold medal – first place	1974 Istanbul	100 kg
Gold medal – first place	1977 Gotheburg	100 kg
Gold medal – first place	1978 Mexico City	100 kg
Gold medal – first place	1979 San Diego	100 kg
European Championships
Gold medal – first place	1973 Helsinki	100 kg
Silver medal – second place	1974 Madrid	100 kg
Gold medal – first place	1975 Ludwigshafen	100 kg
Gold medal – first place	1976 Leningrad	100 kg
Gold medal – first place	1977 Bursa	100 kg
Gold medal – first place	1978 Sofia	100 kg
Gold medal – first place	1979 Bucharest	100 kg
Bronze medal – third place	1984 Jönköping	100 kg

Nikolay Fyodorovich Balboshin (Russian: Николай Фёдорович Балбошин; born 8 June 1949) is a retired Soviet heavyweight Greco-Roman wrestler. He rarely lost a bout in the 1970s, winning five world titles, six European titles, and an Olympics gold medal in 1976. At the 1976 Olympics he pinned all his five opponents, in total spending less than 17 minutes on the mat. He was the Soviet flag bearer and a clear favorite at the Moscow Olympics, but injured an Achilles tendon in the second bout and withdrew from the tournament. He recovered by 1984, when he won his last Soviet title and was selected for the 1984 Games, but could not compete because of the 1984 Summer Olympics boycott by the Soviet Union. He retired from competitions to become a wrestling coach n Moscow. In 2006 he was inducted into the FILA International Wrestling Hall of Fame.

Balboshin was born in East Germany, where his father, a career military officer, was serving at the time. He is married to Nina Balboshina and has a son Nikolai (born 1973) and a daughter Yelena (born 1979). He took up wrestling when his family moved to Moscow and trained together with his elder brother Vladimir. His career was marred by injuries. In the 1960s he broke his arm at a junior wrestling competition. In 1972 he was included to the Soviet national team to compete at the 1972 European championships and Summer Olympics, but lost that season after tearing a knee tendon. He won the Soviet, European and world titles in 1973 while recovering from a shoulder injury, which also bothered him next year when he lost the European championships final to Kamen Goranov. In 1975 he won the European title, but injured a hip at the world championships and placed fourth.
