= Caj Malmberg =

Finnish wrestler

Personal information
- Nationality: Finnish
- Born: 24 January 1948 (age 78) Helsinki, Finland

Sport
- Sport: Wrestling

Caj Malmberg (born 24 January 1948) is a Finnish wrestler. He competed in the men's Greco-Roman 97 kg at the 1968 Summer Olympics.
