= Ivan Ivanov (wrestler, born 1937) =

Bulgarian wrestler

Personal information
- Nationality: Bulgarian
- Born: 24 April 1937
- Died: 27 August 2010 (aged 73)

Sport
- Sport: Wrestling
Medal record
Representing Bulgaria
World Championships
Bronze medal – third place	1963 Helsingborg	63 kg

Ivan Ivanov (24 April 1937 – 27 August 2010) was a Bulgarian wrestler. He competed in the men's Greco-Roman lightweight at the 1964 Summer Olympics.
