= Rune Johnsson =

Swedish wrestler

Personal information
- Nationality: Swedish
- Born: 28 May 1933 (age 93) Sundsvall, Sweden

Sport
- Sport: Wrestling

Rune Johnsson (born 28 May 1933) is a Swedish wrestler. He competed in the men's Greco-Roman lightweight at the 1964 Summer Olympics.
