= Bulgarian Sportsperson of the Year =

Annual award

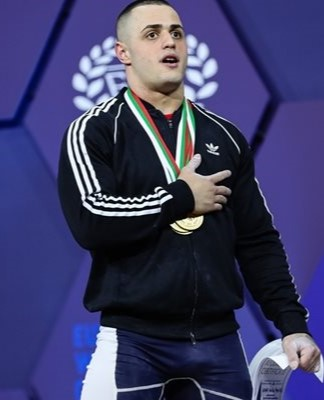
Karlos Nasar is the current prize holder.

Bulgarian Sportsperson of the Year (Bulgarian: Спортист на годината на България, Sportist na godinata na Balgariya) is an annual award given to the best Bulgarian sportsperson of the year. The winner is selected by authorized journalists. The award was established by the Naroden Sport newspaper and specifically by Aleksandar Yasnikov. It was first given in 1958 to the basketball player Vanya Voynova. The person with the most awards is high-jumper Stefka Kostadinova with four. Traditionally, the award is given at the Sportsperson of the Year Ball which is attended by journalists, sportspeople, social figures, intellectuals, etc.

== Bulgarian Sportspeople of the Year ==
Year	Winner	Sport
1958	Vanya Voynova	basketball
1959	Lyutvi Ahmedov	freestyle and Greco-Roman wrestling
1960	Dimitar Dobrev	Greco-Roman wrestling
1961	Dimitar Khlebarov	athletics, pole vault
1962	Enyu Valchev	freestyle wrestling
1963	Prodan Gardzhev	freestyle wrestling
1964	Boyan Radev	Greco-Roman wrestling
1965	Georgi Asparuhov	association football
1966	Prodan Gardzhev	freestyle wrestling
1967	Boyan Radev	Greco-Roman wrestling
1968	Boyan Radev	Greco-Roman wrestling
1969	Mikhail Zhelev	athletics, 3000 metres
1970	Petar Kirov	Greco-Roman wrestling
1971	Petar Kirov	Greco-Roman wrestling
1972	Yordan Bikov	weightlifting
1973	Nedelcho Kolev	weightlifting
1974	Lilyana Tomova	athletics
1975	Valentin Khristov	weightlifting
1976	Ivanka Khristova	athletics, shot put
1977	Totka Petrova	athletics, 800 metres and 1500 metres
1978	Zdravka Yordanova and Svetla Otsetova	rowing
1979	Aleksandar Tomov	Greco-Roman wrestling
1980	Lyubomir Lyubenov	canoeing
1981	Yanko Rusev	weightlifting
1982	Blagoy Blagoev	weightlifting
1983	Vasil Etropolski	fencing, sabre
1984	Lyudmila Andonova-Zhecheva	athletics, high jump
1985	Stefka Kostadinova	athletics, high jump
1986	Yordanka Donkova	athletics, 110 metre hurdles
1986	Asen Zlatev	weightlifting
1987	Stefka Kostadinova	athletics, high jump
1987	Khristo Markov	athletics, triple jump
1988	Tanya Dangalakova	swimming, breaststroke
1988	Khristo Markov	athletics, triple jump
1989	Vesela Letcheva	sport shooting
1989	Valentin Jordanov	freestyle wrestling
1990	Stefan Botev	weightlifting
1991	Serafim Todorov	boxing
1992	Nikolay Bukhalov	canoeing
1993	Serafim Todorov	boxing
1994	Hristo Stoichkov	association football
1995	Stefka Kostadinova	athletics, high jump
1996	Stefka Kostadinova	athletics, high jump
1997	Yoto Yotov	weightlifting
1998	Ekaterina Dafovska	biathlon
1999	Galabin Boevski	weightlifting
2000	Tereza Marinova	athletics, triple jump
2001	Yordan Yovchev	artistic gymnastics
2002	Rumyana Neykova	rowing
2003	Yordan Yovchev	artistic gymnastics
2004	Mariya Grozdeva	sport shooting
2005	Veselin Topalov	chess
2006	Albena Denkova and Maxim Staviski	ice dancing
2007	Stanka Zlateva	wrestling
2008	Rumyana Neykova	rowing
2009	Detelin Dalakliev	boxing
2010	Stanka Zlateva	freestyle wrestling
2011	Stanka Zlateva	freestyle wrestling
2012	Kubrat Pulev	boxing
2013	Ivo Angelov	wrestling
2014	Grigor Dimitrov	tennis
2015	Gabriela Petrova	athletics, triple jump
2016	Mirela Demireva	athletics, high jump
2017	Grigor Dimitrov	tennis
2018	Taybe Yusein	freestyle wrestling
2019	Vladimir Iliev	biathlon
2020	Tsvetana Pironkova	tennis
2021	Ivet Goranova	karate
2022	Sasha Vezenkov	basketball
2023	Sasha Vezenkov	basketball
2024	Karlos Nasar	weightlifting
2025	Karlos Nasar	weightlifting
