= Pat Lovell (wrestler) =

American wrestler

Personal information
- Nationality: American
- Born: November 1, 1937 (age 89) Richmond, California, U.S.

Sport
- Sport: Wrestling
- Event: Greco-Roman

Pat Lovell (born November 1, 1937) is an American wrestler. He competed in the men's Greco-Roman light heavyweight at the 1964 Summer Olympics.
