= Jawdat Jabra =

Syrian wrestler

Personal information
- Nationality: Syrian
- Born: 5 August 1948 (age 77)

Sport
- Sport: Wrestling

Jawdat Jabra (born 5 August 1948) is a Syrian wrestler. He competed in the men's Greco-Roman +100 kg at the 1980 Summer Olympics, losing both his matches.
