= Mahmoud Ibrahim =

Egyptian wrestler

Personal information
- Nationality: Egyptian
- Born: 24 November 1937 (age 88)

Sport
- Sport: Wrestling
Medal record
Men's Greco-Roman wrestling
Representing Egypt
African Championships
Silver medal – second place	2025 Casablanca	87 kg

Mahmoud Ibrahim (born 24 November 1937) is an Egyptian wrestler. He competed in the men's Greco-Roman lightweight at the 1964 Summer Olympics.
