= Tokuaki Fujita =

Japanese wrestler (1941–2011)

Personal information
- Nationality: Japanese
- Born: 10 January 1941
- Died: 7 August 2011 (aged 70)

Sport
- Sport: Wrestling

Tokuaki Fujita (藤田 徳明, Fujita Tokuaki; 10 January 1941 – 7 August 2011) was a Japanese wrestler. He competed in the men's Greco-Roman lightweight at the 1964 Summer Olympics.
