= Franz Schmitt =

German wrestler

Personal information
- Nationality: German
- Born: 5 September 1937 (age 88) Aschaffenburg, Germany

Sport
- Sport: Wrestling

Franz Schmitt (born 5 September 1937) is a German wrestler. He competed in the men's Greco-Roman lightweight at the 1964 Summer Olympics.
