= James Burke (wrestler) =

American wrestler (1936–2006)

Personal information
- Born: February 20, 1936 Denver, Colorado, U.S.
- Died: May 11, 2006 (aged 70) Marin County, California, U.S.

Sport
- Country: United States
- Sport: Wrestling
- Events: Greco-Roman; Freestyle; Folkstyle
- Club: Olympic Club – San Francisco
- Team: USA
Medal record
Men's Greco-Roman wrestling
Representing the United States
World Championships
Bronze medal – third place	1962 Toledo	70 kg
Collegiate Wrestling
Representing San Francisco State
NCAA Division II Championships
Gold medal – first place	1965 Golden	157 lb

James "Jim" Burke (February 20, 1936 – May 11, 2006) was an American wrestler. He was a bronze medalist at the 1962 Greco-Roman World Championships, making him the first American to win a medal at the Greco-Roman World Championships. He also competed in the men's Greco-Roman lightweight division at the 1964 Summer Olympics. In 1965, he was on both the Greco-Roman and Freestyle USA World Teams.
