= Takeshi Nagao =

Japanese wrestler

Personal information
- Nationality: Japanese
- Born: 7 December 1943 (age 82) Tokyo, Japan

Sport
- Sport: Wrestling

Takeshi Nagao (長尾 猛司, Nagao Takeshi; born 7 December 1943) is a Japanese wrestler. He competed in the men's Greco-Roman 97 kg at the 1968 Summer Olympics.
