= Imre Vígh =

Hungarian wrestler

Personal information
- Nationality: Hungarian
- Born: 3 April 1938 Székesfehérvár, Hungary
- Died: 23 April 2001 (aged 63) Székesfehérvár, Hungary

Sport
- Sport: Wrestling

Imre Vígh (3 April 1938 – 23 April 2001) was a Hungarian wrestler. He competed in the men's freestyle light heavyweight at the 1964 Summer Olympics.
