= Jürgen Klinge =

German wrestler

Personal information
- Nationality: German
- Born: 27 June 1940 (age 86) Leipzig, Germany

Sport
- Sport: Wrestling

Jürgen Klinge (born 27 June 1940) is a German former wrestler. He competed in the men's Greco-Roman 97 kg at the 1968 Summer Olympics.
