= Kazım Ayvaz =

Turkish sports wrestler (1938–2020)

Personal information
- Nationality: Turkish
- Born: March 10, 1938 Rize, Turkey
- Died: January 18, 2020 (aged 81) Sweden

Sport
- Country: Turkey
- Sport: Greco-Roman wrestling
- Event: Lightweight
- Retired: 1969
Medal record
Representing Turkey
Olympic Games
| Gold medal – first place | 1964 Tokyo | 70 kg |
World Championships
| Gold medal – first place | 1958 Budapest | 73 kg |
| Gold medal – first place | 1962 Toledo | 70 kg |
Balkan Championships
| Gold medal – first place | 1959 Istanbul | 73 kg |
| Silver medal – second place | 1964 Constanta | 70 kg |
Adriatic Cup
| Bronze medal – third place | 1957 Opatija | 73 kg |
Men's freestyle wrestling
Balkan Championships
| Silver medal – second place | 1960 Burgas | 73 kg |

Kazım Ayvaz (March 10, 1938 – January 18, 2020) was a Turkish Olympic medalist sports wrestler in the lightweight class and a trainer. He won the gold medal in Men's Greco-Roman wrestling at the 1964 Olympics and became world champion twice.

== Career ==
He was born 1938 in Rize, north-eastern Turkey. He began wrestling 1953 at his age of 15 in the "İstanbul Güreş İhtisas Kulübü", a club in Fatih, Istanbul specialized in wrestling.

He won the gold medal at the 1958 World Wrestling Championships in Budapest in 73 kg. Greco-Roman wrestling, ahead of silver medalist Grigory Gamarnik of the USSR and bronze medalist Valeriu Bularca of Romania.

Representing his country in Greco-Roman style wrestling, he participated at three consecutive Olympics in 1960, 1964 and 1968, however was successful only in Tokyo. From 1964 on, Kazım Ayvaz could not repeat his victorious matches. He retired from the active sports in 1969 and served from then on as a trainer in Sweden, where he emigrated after the 1968 Olympics.

Ayvaz lived in Sweden until his death on 18 January 2020.

== Achievements ==
- 1957 Adriatic Cup in Opatija, Yugoslavia – bronze (Greco-Roman Welterweight)
- 1958 World Wrestling Championships in Budapest, Hungary – gold (Greco-Roman Welterweight)
- 1959 Balkan Wrestling Championships in Istanbul, Turkey – gold (Greco-Roman 73 kg)
- 1960 Balkan Wrestling Championships in Burgas, Bulgaria – silver (Freestyle 73 kg)
- 1960 Summer Olympics in Rome, Italy – 4th (Greco-Roman Middleweight)
- 1962 World Wrestling Championships in Toledo, Ohio, U.S. – gold (Greco-Roman Lightweight)
- 1963 World Wrestling Championships in Helsingborg, Sweden – 17th (Greco-Roman Lightweight)
- 1964 Summer Olympics in Tokyo, Japan – gold (Greco-Roman Lightweight)
- 1964 Balkan Wrestling Championships in Constanţa, Romania – silver (Greco-Roman Lightweight)
- 1966 European Wrestling Championships in Essen, Germany – 4th (Greco-Roman Lightweight)
- 1966, World Wrestling Championships in Toledo, Ohio, U.S. – 6th (Greco-Roman Lightweight)
- 1968 Summer Olympics in Mexico City, Mexico – 24th, injured (Greco-Roman Lightweight)
