= Heinz Schäfer (wrestler) =

German wrestler

Personal information
- Nationality: German
- Born: 17 March 1950 Oer-Erkenschwick, Germany
- Died: 13 July 1983 (aged 33)

Sport
- Sport: Wrestling

Heinz Schäfer (17 March 1950 – 13 July 1983) was a German wrestler. He competed in the men's Greco-Roman 100 kg at the 1976 Summer Olympics.
