= Sión Cóhen =

Panamanian wrestler (born 1934)

Personal information
- Full name: Sión Ernesto Cóhen Cattán
- Nationality: Panamanian
- Born: 30 November 1934

Sport
- Sport: Wrestling

Sión Ernesto Cóhen Cattán (born 30 November 1934, date of death unknown) was a Panamanian wrestler. He competed in the men's freestyle light heavyweight at the 1964 Summer Olympics. Cóhen died prior to 2011.
