= Akira Nakaura =

Japanese wrestler

Personal information
- Nationality: Japanese
- Born: 3 November 1935 (age 91) Hiroshima, Japan

Sport
- Sport: Wrestling

Akira Nakaura (中浦 章, Nakaura Akira; born 3 November 1935) is a Japanese wrestler. He competed in the men's Greco-Roman light heavyweight at the 1964 Summer Olympics.
