= Petar Cucić =

Yugoslav wrestler (born 1935)

Personal information
- Nationality: Yugoslav
- Born: 18 March 1935 (age 91)

Sport
- Sport: Wrestling

Petar Cucić (born 18 March 1935) is a Yugoslav wrestler. He competed in the men's Greco-Roman light heavyweight at the 1964 Summer Olympics.
