= Nikolay Yakovenko =

Russian Greco-Roman wrestler

Personal information
- Born: 5 November 1941 Rostov Oblast, Russian SFSR, Soviet Union
- Died: 22 December 2006 (aged 65) Moscow, Russia
- Height: 180 cm (5 ft 11 in)
- Weight: 100 kg (220 lb)

Sport
- Sport: Greco-Roman wrestling
- Club: Soviet Army
Medal record
Representing the Soviet Union
Olympic Games
Silver medal – second place	1968 Mexico City	97 kg
Silver medal – second place	1972 Munich	100 kg
World Championships
Gold medal – first place	1967 Bucharest	97 kg
Gold medal – first place	1969 Mar del Plata	100 kg
Bronze medal – third place	1970 Edmonton	100 kg
European Championships
Gold medal – first place	1972 Katowice	100 kg

Nikolay Ivanovich Yakovenko (Russian: Николай Иванович Яковенко; 5 November 1941 – 22 December 2006) was a heavyweight Greco-Roman wrestler from Russia. He won the world title in 1967 and 1969 and Olympic silver medals in 1968 and 1972.

Yakovenko took up wrestling in 1958 and won his first Soviet title in 1961, in the welterweight division. He was included to the Soviet national team in 1967, when he moved up to the light-heavyweight category. In 1969 he won his last Soviet title, in the heavyweight division. He retired after the 1972 Olympics and had a long career as a wrestling coach and official. Between 1973 and 1980 he headed the Soviet Greco-Roman team, and after that coached at Soviet Army clubs in Rostov and Moscow. Starting from 1985 he also headed the physical education department of the Moscow State University of Railway Engineering. Since 2009, an annual Greco-Roman wrestling tournament has been held in Rostov in his honor.
