= Wacław Orłowski =

Polish wrestler (1945–2026)

Personal information
- Nationality: Polish
- Born: 5 January 1945 Braunau am Inn, Reichsgau Oberdonau, Nazi Germany
- Died: 9 August 2026 (aged 81)

Sport
- Sport: Wrestling

Wacław Orłowski (5 January 1945 – 9 August 2026) was a Polish wrestler. He competed in the men's Greco-Roman 97 kg at the 1968 Summer Olympics. Orłowski died on 9 August 2026, at the age of 81.
