= Gürbüz Lü =

Turkish wrestler

Personal information
- Nationality: Turkish
- Born: 1943 (age 82–83) Samsun, Turkey

Sport
- Sport: Wrestling

Gürbüz Lü (born 1943) is a Turkish wrestler. He competed in the men's Greco-Roman 97 kg at the 1968 Summer Olympics. He was the flag bearer for Turkey in the opening ceremony.
