= Jerry Conine =

American wrestler (born 1939)

Personal information
- Born: December 2, 1939 (age 86) Tacoma, Washington, U.S.

Sport
- Country: United States
- Sport: Wrestling
- Events: Freestyle and Greco-Roman
- Team: USA

Jerry Conine (born December 2, 1939) is an American former wrestler, American footballer and American handball player. Conine competed in the men's freestyle light heavyweight at the 1964 Summer Olympics, and played American football for Washington State Cougars and the Tacoma Tyees.

== Career ==
Conine competed in the men's freestyle light heavyweight at the 1964 Summer Olympics, finishing sixth overall. Conine later won his event at the 1965 Association of American Universities national Greco-Roman wrestling championships.

Conine also played college football for the Washington State Cougars, and American football for the Tacoma Tyees in the North Pacific Football League. He missed part of the 1964 Tyees season to compete at the Olympics.

In 1970, Conine took up American handball. He finished second in the doubles event at the 1976 national championships. In the 1970s and 1980s, he competed in the Championship Riverside Handball League, and was described as "one of the greatest handball players Southern California has ever produced." Conine was still competing in age group handball in 1999, when he competed in the United States Handball Association National Championships.

In 2006, Conine was inducted into the Wrestling Hall of Fame. In 2007, he was inducted into the Southern California Handball Association hall of fame.

== Personal life ==
Conine is from Tacoma, Washington, United States, and later lived in Riverside, California. His son Jeff played in Major League Baseball, and his grandson Griffin plays in Major League Baseball for the Miami Marlins.
