= Lachezar Stoyanov =

Bulgarian volleyball player (born 1943)

Personal information
- Nationality: Bulgarian
- Born: 4 January 1943 (age 82); Montana, Bulgaria

Sport
- Sport: Volleyball

Lachezar Stoyanov (Bulgarian: Лъчезар Стоянов, born 4 January 1943) is a Bulgarian volleyball player. He competed at the 1964 Summer Olympics and the 1972 Summer Olympics.
