= Yasunari Akiyama =

Japanese wrestler

Personal information
- Nationality: Japanese
- Born: 11 March 1948 (age 78) Hiroshima, Japan

Sport
- Sport: Wrestling

Yasunari Akiyama (秋山 安成, Akiyama Yasunari; born 11 March 1948) is a Japanese wrestler. He competed in the men's Greco-Roman 100 kg at the 1976 Summer Olympics.
