= Hassan Bechara =

Lebanese wrestler (1945–2017)

Medal record

Men's Greco-Roman wrestling

Representing Lebanon

Olympic Games
Bronze medal – third place	1980 Moscow	Super heavyweight

Hassan Ali Bechara (March 17, 1945 – July 24, 2017) was a Lebanese wrestler. At the 1980 Summer Olympics, at the age of 35, he won the bronze medal in the men's Greco-Roman Super Heavyweight category. He was born in Beirut.
