= Valeriu Bularca =

Romanian Greco-Roman wrestler

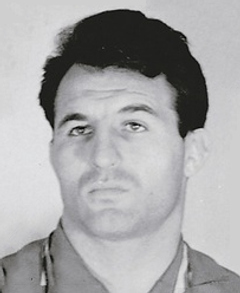

Personal information
- Born: 14 February 1931 Întorsura Buzăului, Romania
- Died: 7 February 2017 (aged 85) Brașov, Romania
- Height: 174 cm (5 ft 9 in)

Sport
- Sport: Greco-Roman wrestling
- Club: Dinamo Brașov
Medal record
Representing Romania
Olympic Games
Silver medal – second place	1964 Tokyo	70 kg
World Championships
Bronze medal – third place	1958 Budapest	73 kg
Gold medal – first place	1961 Yokohama	73 kg

Valeriu Bularca (14 February 1931 – 7 February 2017) was a Greco-Roman wrestler from Romania. He competed at the 1960 and 1964 Olympics and won a silver medal in 1964. In 1961 he became the first Romanian wrestler to win a world title. Domestically he collected six national titles between 1957 and 1964. After retiring from competitions he worked as a wrestling coach at CS Steagu Roșu in Brașov.

He died in Brașov on 7 February 2017.
