= Hughie Williams =

Personal information
- Born: 3 September 1933
- Died: 15 October 2017 (aged 84)
- Height
- Weight

Sport
- Sport: wrestling

Hughie Williams (3 September 1933 – 15 October 2017) was State Secretary of the Queensland Branch of the Transport Workers Union of Australia. He was State Secretary from 1992–2010 and was the national president in 2000. He was also State Secretary during the early 1980s and had been secretary of the now defunct Brisbane sub-branch throughout the 1980s.

Williams was a stalwart of the Union movement in his time as organiser and then Branch Secretary.

On 10 December 2010 Williams stood aside as secretary after being defeated by a landslide defeat in the quadrennial elections by 'The New Transport Worker Team' headed by Peter Biagini. Williams was 77 when he was defeated.

Williams died on 15 October 2017.

== Activist ==
Williams dedicated his life to fighting injustices and was instrumental in the protests against the Springboks Tour in the 1970s.

Williams stood as unsuccessfully an ALP candidate for the Queensland state seat of Ithaca in 1972.

== Wrestling and early life ==
Williams was raised in the coalmining area of Maitland in NSW. Williams has also competed at the 1964 Summer Olympics in wrestling in the light-heavyweight freestyle (<97kgs) division and was involved in organising for Brisbane's 1982 Commonwealth Games.Williams was elected a Gold Life member of Wrestling Australia for his service as a volunteer and committee member. Exhibition notes for Rockhampton's Museum of Art WrestleMANIA exhibition notes that Rockhampton was a stronghold for Williams. Brett MacAnally's poem "The Paddo of my youth" contains the line "Hughie Williams taught the Wrestling" at the PYC.

== Books ==
Murray Johnson's biography of Williams "No holds barred: Hughie Williams: Olympic wrestler and trade union heavyweight" was published in 2003 by the Central Queensland University Press.

In 2009 former Federal ALP leader and Deputy Prime Minister, Kim Beazley AC launched Williams' autobiography "A Life". The launch attended was by the then Labor Premier Anna Bligh AC and Campbell Newman AO (who defeated Bligh in the 2012 state election).

== Union Cooperative Society ==
Williams and others assisted Qld Labor figure George Georges in establishing the Union Cooperative Society. Williams was Chair of the Coop in the 1990s. during Georges' and Williams time, the Paddington Workers Club was established. Senator Clair Moore recalls a large picture of Williams in his wrestling gear in the entrance of the club.

== Hughie Williams Park ==
Brisbane Council has named a park in Cecil Road, Bardon, a suburb of which Williams was a resident, the Hughie Williams Park.
