= Dimitrios Savvas =

Greek wrestler

Personal information
- Born: 17 September 1939 (age 86) Florina, Greece
- Height: 170 cm (5 ft 7 in)
- Weight: 78 kg (172 lb)

Sport
- Sport: Greco-Roman wrestling
- Club: Ethnikos GS, Athens

Dimitrios Savvas (Greek: Δημήτριος Σαββας; born 17 September 1939) is a retired Greco-Roman wrestler from Greece who competed at the 1964 and 1968 Summer Olympics.
