= Tore Hem =

Norwegian sport wrestler

Tore Hem (born 12 November 1944) is a retired Norwegian sport wrestler who competed in three Summer Olympics.

He was born in Oslo, and represented the sports club SK av 1909. He competed mostly in the heavyweight class, but sometimes in the light-heavyweight class. At the World Championships he finished fifth in 1967 and fourth in 1969. At the European Championships he finished sixth in 1967, won a silver in 1969, finished fifth in 1975 and sixth in 1978.

At the Olympics he finished fifth in 1968 (light-heavyweight), sixth in 1972 (heavyweight) and fifth in 1976 (heavyweight). He competed in freestyle once, at the 1976 Summer Olympics, where he withdrew after round one.

He took twenty Norwegian national titles between 1965 and 1991, which is a Norwegian record.
