= Kamen Goranov =

Bulgarian wrestler (born 1948)

Medal record

Men's Greco-Roman wrestling

Representing Bulgaria

Olympic Games
Silver medal – second place	1976 Montreal	heavyweight

Kamen Goranov (Bulgarian: Камен Горанов) (born 7 June 1948) is a Bulgarian former wrestler who competed in the 1976 Summer Olympics.
