= Kim Ik-jong =

South Korean wrestler

Personal information
- Nationality: South Korean
- Born: 10 May 1941 (age 83)

Sport
- Sport: Wrestling

Kim Ik-jong (born 10 May 1941) is a South Korean wrestler who competed at the 1964 and the 1968 Summer Olympics.
