= Andrzej Skrzydlewski =

Polish Greco-Roman wrestler (1946–2006)

Medal record

Men's Greco-Roman wrestling

Representing Poland

Olympic Games
Bronze medal – third place	1976 Montréal	Heavyweight (100 kg)

Andrzej Skrzydlewski (3 November 1946 – 28 May 2006) was a Polish wrestler who competed in the 1972 and 1976 Summer Olympics. He was the bronze medalist at the 1976 Summer Olympics in wrestling in the 100 kg (220 lb) category (heavyweight). Skrzydlewski was born in and died in Ksawerów.
