= Roland Andersson (wrestler) =

Swedish former wrestler

Roland Andersson (born 9 September 1944) is a Swedish former wrestler who competed in the 1972 Summer Olympics.
