= Hristo Ignatov =

Bulgarian wrestler

Hristo Ignatov (Bulgarian: Христо Игнатов; born 1 December 1953) is a Bulgarian former wrestler who competed in the 1972 Summer Olympics.
