= Lennart Eriksson (wrestler) =

Swedish Greco-Roman wrestler

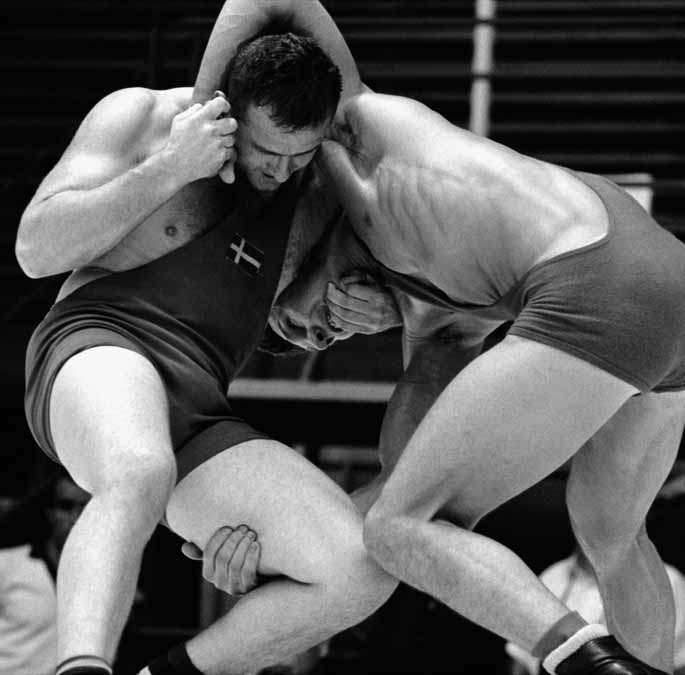
- Eriksson (left) vs. Aleksandr Medved at the 1964 Olympics

Personal information
- Born: 4 February 1939 Västerås, Sweden
- Died: 1 September 2017 (aged 78)
- Height: 189 cm (6 ft 2 in)
- Weight: 97 kg (214 lb)

Sport
- Sport: Greco-Roman wrestling
- Club: IF Norden, Sala
Medal record
Men's wrestling (Greco-Roman)
Representing Sweden
World Championships
Bronze medal – third place	1969 Mar del Plata	-100 kg

Knut Olof Lennart Eriksson (4 February 1939 – 1 September 2017) was a Swedish wrestler. At the 1969 World Championships he finished fourth in the unlimited-weight freestyle and won a bronze medal in the under 100 kg Greco-Roman contest. He competed in the light-heavyweight freestyle event at the 1964 Summer Olympics, but was eliminated in the second round by the eventual winner Aleksandr Medved.
