= Petar Krachmarov =

Bulgarian volleyball player

Personal information
- Nationality: Bulgarian
- Born: 31 January 1938 (age 87); Sofia, Bulgaria

Sport
- Sport: Volleyball

Petar Krachmarov (Bulgarian: Петър Кръчмаров, born 31 January 1938) is a Bulgarian volleyball player. He competed at the 1964 Summer Olympics and the 1968 Summer Olympics.
