= David Gvantseladze =

Georgian Greco-Roman wrestler

Personal information
- Born: 28 March 1937 Batumi, Georgian SSR, Soviet Union
- Died: 1 May 1984 (aged 47) Tbilisi, Georgian SSR, Soviet Union
- Height: 1.67 m (5 ft 6 in)

Sport
- Sport: Greco-Roman wrestling
- Club: Burevestnik Tbilisi
Medal record
Representing the Soviet Union
Olympic Games
| Bronze medal – third place | 1964 Tokyo | Lightweight |
World Championships
| Silver medal – second place | 1963 Helsingborg | Lightweight |

David Gvantseladze (Georgian: დავით გვანცელაძე; Russian: Давид Гванцеладзе; 28 March 1937 – 1 May 1984) was a Georgian wrestler. He won a bronze medal at the 1964 Summer Olympics and a silver medal at the 1963 World Wrestling Championships in Greco-Roman wrestling in the lightweight category (under 70 kg).
