= Wahid Ullah Zaid =

Afghan wrestler (born 1944)

Wahid Ullah Zaid (born 1 September 1944) is a retired Greco-Roman wrestler from Afghanistan. He competed at the 1964 Summer Olympics in the lightweight event.
