= Ölziisaikhany Erdene-Ochir =

Mongolian wrestler

Personal information
- Nationality: Mongolian
- Born: 1 April 1936; Bayanzürkh, Mongolia
- Died: 16 November 2017 (aged 81)

Sport
- Sport: Wrestling

Ölziisaikhany Erdene-Ochir (1 April 1936 – 16 November 2017) was a Mongolian wrestler. He competed at the 1964 Summer Olympics and the 1968 Summer Olympics.
