= Gıyasettin Yılmaz =

Turkish wrestler (1938–2018)

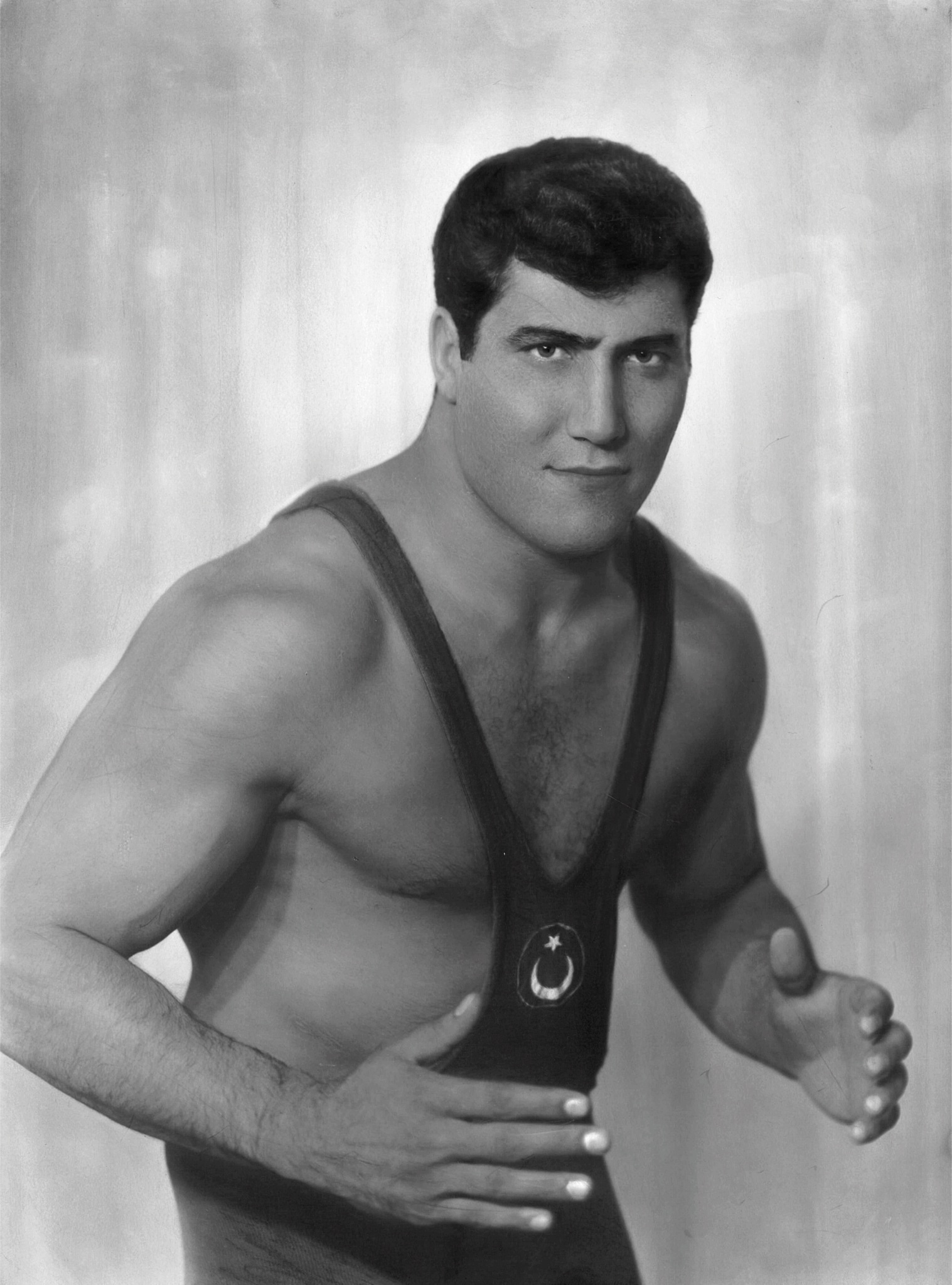
Gıyasettin Yılmaz

Gıyasettin Yılmaz (6 May 1938 – October 2018) was a Turkish wrestler who competed in the 1964 Summer Olympics, in the 1968 Summer Olympics, and in the 1972 Summer Olympics. Yılmaz was the flag bearer for Turkey in the opening ceremony of the 1972 Summer Olympics.
