= Stancho Penchev =

Bulgarian weightlifter (born 1940)

Personal information
- Nationality: Bulgarian
- Born: 9 May 1940 (age 84); Plovdiv, Bulgaria

Sport
- Sport: Weightlifting

Stancho Penchev (Bulgarian: Станчо Пенчев; born 9 May 1940) is a Bulgarian weightlifter. He competed at the 1964 Summer Olympics as a light heavyweight and the 1972 Summer Olympics as a heavyweight. He was ranked number one in Bulgaria for his weight class in 1963, 1966, 1969, 1971, 1973 and 1974.
