= Rostom Abashidze =

Georgian wrestler (born 1935)

Personal information
- Born: 23 February 1935 (age 91) Batumi, Georgia
- Height: 188 cm (6 ft 2 in)
- Weight: 97 kg (214 lb)

Sport
- Sport: Greco-Roman wrestling
Medal record
Representing the Soviet Union
World Championships
Gold medal – first place	1958 Budapest	-87 kg
Gold medal – first place	1962 Toledo	-97 kg
Gold medal – first place	1963 Helsingborg	-97 kg

Rost'om (Rostom) Omeris Abashidze (Georgian: როსტომ ომერის ძე აბაშიძე, Russian: Ростом Омарович Абашидзе, born 23 February 1935) is a retired light-heavyweight Greco-Roman wrestler from Georgia. Competing for the Soviet Union he won the world title in 1958, 1962 and 1963 and placed fifth at the 1964 Summer Olympics.

Abashidze first trained in swimming and association football before changing to wrestling. After graduating from secondary school in Batumi he moved to Tbilisi, where he studied at the Georgian Technical University and later defended a PhD in construction engineering. Shortly before the 1964 Olympics he fell ill with hepatitis A and have not fully recovered. He retired from competitions after the games to become a wrestling coach in Georgia. Later he also held executive positions in the construction industry.
