= Alejandro Echaniz =

Mexican wrestler

Alejandro Echaniz Partida
Personal information
- Nationality: Mexican
- Born: 7 September 1942 (age 84)

Sport
- Sport: Wrestling

Alejandro Echaniz Partida (born 7 September 1942) is a Mexican wrestler. He competed in two events at the 1964 Summer Olympics.
