= Slavcho Slavov =

Bulgarian volleyball player

Personal information
- Nationality: Bulgarian
- Born: 26 February 1937 (age 88)

Sport
- Sport: Volleyball

Slavcho Slavov (Bulgarian: Славчо Славов, born 26 February 1937) is a Bulgarian volleyball player. He competed in the men's tournament at the 1964 Summer Olympics.
