= Kurt Madsen =

Danish wrestler

Personal information
- Nationality: Danish
- Born: 8 January 1936 (age 90) Melby, Denmark

Sport
- Sport: Wrestling

Kurt Madsen (born 8 January 1936) is a Danish wrestler. He competed at the 1964 Summer Olympics and the 1968 Summer Olympics.
