= Eero Tapio =

Finnish wrestler (1941–2022)

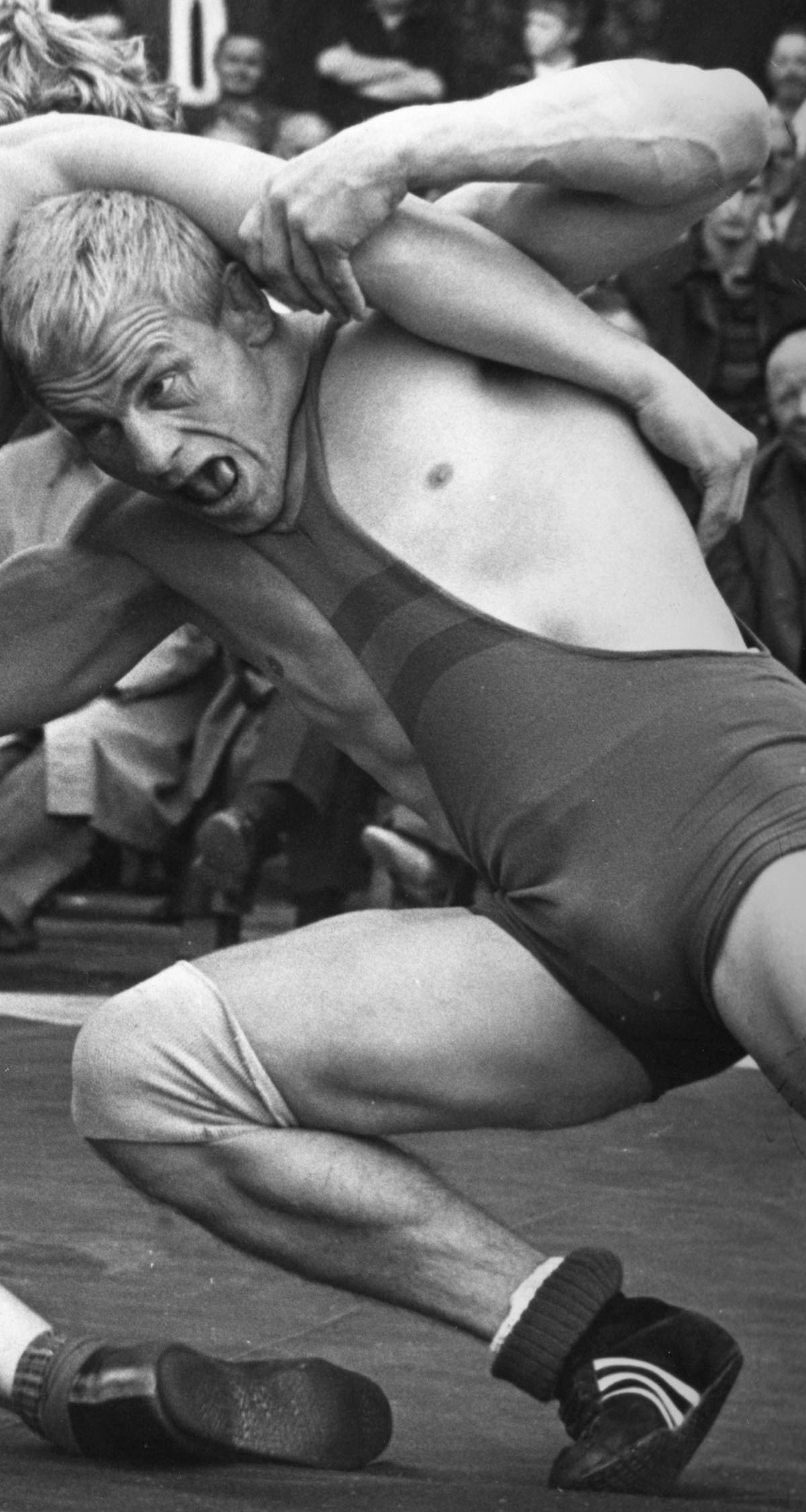
- Tapio in 1963

Personal information
- Born: 3 March 1941 Muhos, Finland
- Died: 17 December 2022 (aged 81)
- Height: 170 cm (5 ft 7 in)
- Weight: 70–78 kg (154–172 lb)

Sport
- Sport: Greco-Roman wrestling
- Club: Haukiputaan Heitto
Medal record
Men's Greco-Roman wrestling
Representing Finland
World Championships
Bronze medal – third place	1965 Tampere	-70 kg
Bronze medal – third place	1966 Toledo	-70 kg
Gold medal – first place	1967 Bucharest	-70 kg
Silver medal – second place	1969 Mar del Plata	-74 kg
European Championships
Silver medal – second place	1967 Minsk	-70 kg
Gold medal – first place	1969 Modena	-74 kg

Eero Johannes "Erkka" Tapio (3 March 1941 – 17 December 2022) was a Greco-Roman wrestler from Finland who won four medals at the world championships of 1965–69, including a gold medal in 1967. He competed at the 1964, 1968 and 1972 Summer Olympics and placed fifth-sixth in 1964 and 1968. He was voted the Finnish Sports Personality of the Year in 1967, placing within first ten in 1965, 1966 and 1969.

Tapio was born to a farmer, and through his life worked as a painter, janitor, wrestling coach, and sports official. From the 1970s–1980s, he worked with the national wrestling team. He had two children from his marriage, born in 1966 and 1968 respectively.
