= Heinz Kiehl =

German wrestler (1943–2016)

Medal record

Men's Greco-Roman wrestling

Representing Germany

Olympic Games
Bronze medal – third place	1964 Tokyo	Light-heavyweight

Heinz Kiehl (6 June 1943 – 26 July 2016) was a German wrestler who competed in the 1964 Summer Olympics and the 1968 Summer Olympics for West Germany.

Kiehl was born on 6 June 1943 in Oggersheim. He won a bronze medal in 1964 the light-heavyweight division.
