= József Farkas (wrestler) =

Hungarian wrestler

Personal information
- Nationality: Hungarian
- Born: 17 March 1952 (age 73); Budapest, Hungary

Sport
- Sport: Wrestling

József Farkas (born 17 March 1952) is a Hungarian wrestler. He competed at the 1976 Summer Olympics and the 1980 Summer Olympics.
