= Pelle Svensson =

Swedish wrestler and lawyer (1943–2020)

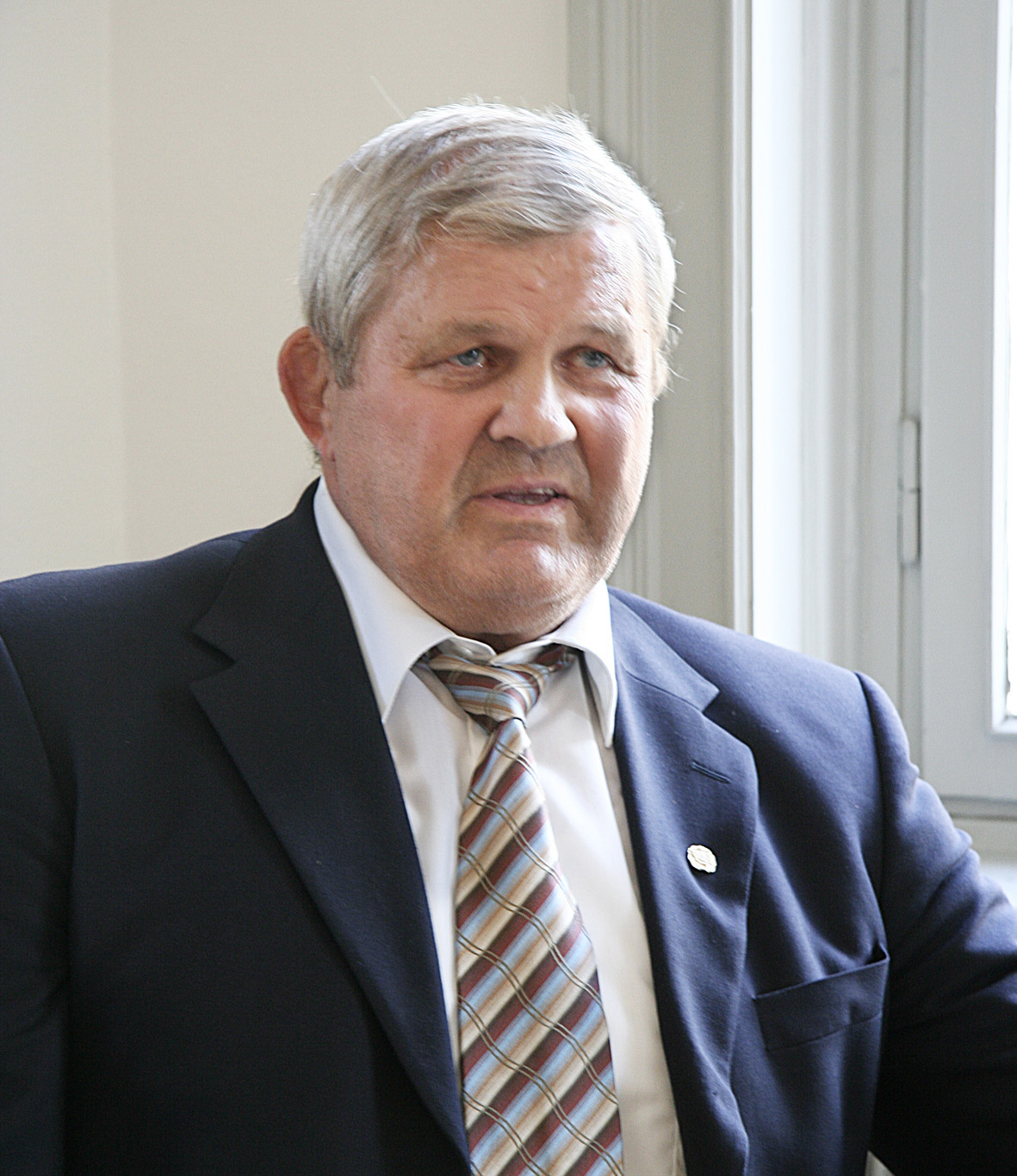
- Svensson in 2009

Personal information
- Born: 6 February 1943 Sollefteå, Sweden
- Died: 17 December 2020 (aged 77) Sundsvall, Sweden
- Height: 188 cm (6 ft 2 in)
- Weight: 105 kg (231 lb)

Sport
- Sport: Greco-Roman wrestling
- Club: SAIK, Sundsvall; Heby BK, Tärnsjö
Medal record
Representing Sweden
Olympic Games
Silver medal – second place	1964 Tokyo	97 kg
World Championships
Gold medal – first place	1970 Edmonton	100 kg
Gold medal – first place	1971 Sofia	100 kg
European Championships
Bronze medal – third place	1966 Essen	97 kg
Bronze medal – third place	1967 Minsk	97 kg
Bronze medal – third place	1968 Västerås	97 kg
Gold medal – first place	1969 Modena	100 kg
Gold medal – first place	1970 East Berlin	100 kg

Per Oskar "Pelle" Svensson (6 February 1943 – 17 December 2020) was a Swedish Greco-Roman wrestler and lawyer. His achievements included a silver medal at the 1964 Summer Olympics in the light heavyweight class and two gold medals at the World Championships in 1970 and 1971.

== Early life ==
Svensson was born on 6 February 1943 in Sollefteå, Sweden, the son of homeowner Henry Svensson and Lydia Svensson.

== Career ==
=== Wrestling career ===
Svensson, who started his career in wrestling in 1955, competed for the clubs Sundsvalls AIK and Heby BK. He won the Swedish Championships for the first time in 1962, competing in the 100 kg class. He won the Swedish Championships for thirteen consecutive years until his retirement in 1974. He competed at the World Championships for the first time in 1963, ending up fourth. At the 1964 Summer Olympics held in Tokyo, Japan, Svensson won a silver medal in the light heavyweight class. He also won two gold medals at the European Championships in 1969 and 1970 and two gold medals at the World Championships in 1970 and 1971, as well as three bronze medals at the European Championships in 1966, 1967, and 1968. As a wrestler he was nicknamed Pelle Swing in Sweden.

Svensson was chairman of the Swedish Wrestling Federation (Swedish: Svenska Brottningsförbundet) from 1993 to 1998, and a member of the board of the International Federation of Associated Wrestling Styles (FILA) from 1990 to 2007. Svensson left his position as a member of the board of the FILA in protest of what he saw as a lack of willingness on the part of the FILA to fight corruption within the sport.

=== Legal career ===
Following his career in wrestling, Svensson pursued a career as a lawyer. He received a Bachelor of Arts degree from Uppsala University in 1970 and a Candidate of Law degree in 1973. He was employed at Lindstedts law firm in Sundsvall in 1977 and had his own law firm from 1989. He became a member of the Swedish Bar Association in 1980.

Svensson was noted for taking on several high-profile criminal cases. He first received attention when he filed a civil suit against a suspected murderer in the case of the disappearance of an eleven-year-old boy north of Sundsvall in 1980 (known in Sweden as Johanfallet, "the Johan Case"), together with the parents of the boy. The case ultimately ended in loss in the court of appeal, which ordered the parents to pay the court costs, and Svensson was criticized and accused of taking the case in order to receive media attention.

In 1988, Svensson served as the defense attorney for Juha Valjakkala, who was later convicted of the murder of three people in the village of Åmsele (known in Sweden as Åmselemorden, "the Åmsele Murders") earlier in the same year. In 2005 he wrote the book Utan nåd : grymhet utan gräns ("Without Mercy – Cruelty Beyond Limit") about the case.

Svensson also served as the defense attorney to Lars Tingström (known in Sweden by the nickname Bombmannen, "the Bomb-Man"), who was later convicted of three bomb attacks around Stockholm. In 1996, Svensson published parts of what he said was a testament authored by Tingström shortly before his death in 1993. In the purported testament, Tingström wrote that he had given Christer Pettersson the instructions to assassinate Swedish Prime Minister Olof Palme. The journalist Gunnar Wall wrote an article in Dagens Nyheter where he accused Svensson of manipulating the testament from Tingström. A forensic investigation later proved the testament to be real. Svensson's information led the prosecutors to file an application for a new trial against Pettersson for the assassination of Palme, but this was rejected by the Supreme Court.

Svensson ended his career as a lawyer after occupational burnout, but continued to take cases after his retirement.

== Personal life ==
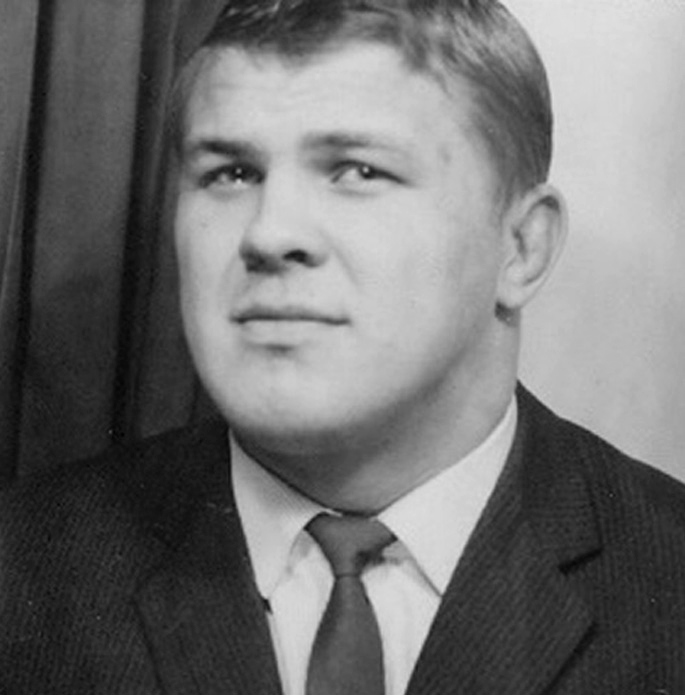
Svensson in the 1960s

Svensson was married to Pia Hallberg (born 1946), the daughter of Andor and Anna Hallberg. They had three children. He lived in the small village of Njurunda outside Sundsvall in Västernorrland County.

== Death ==
Svensson died on 17 December 2020 after suffering from cancer. He was 77.

== Wrestling achievements ==
Year	Event	Venue	Place	Weight class (kg)
1963	FILA World Championships	Helsingborg, Sweden	4th	97.0
1964	Olympic Games	Tokyo, Japan	2nd	97.0
1965	FILA World Championships	Tampere, Finland	4th	97.0
1966	European Championships	Essen, Germany	3rd	97.0
1966	FILA World Championships	Toledo, United States	5th	97.0
1967	European Championships	Minsk, Soviet Union	3rd	97.0
1968	European Championships	Västerås, Sweden	3rd	97.0
1968	Olympic Games	Mexico City, Mexico	4th	97.0
1969	European Championships	Modena, Italy	1st	100.0
1970	European Championships	Berlin, Germany	1st	100.0
1970	FILA World Championships	Edmonton, Canada	1st	100.0
1971	FILA World Championships	Sofia, Bulgaria	1st	100.0

== Bibliography ==
- Öppet brev till Sveriges idrottspampar. Stockholm: Forum. 1973. ISBN 91-37-05397-3.
- Trollpojken. Sundsvall: Sinklarförlaget. 1981. ISBN 91-85780-03-0.
- Rätten på din sida? : hur fungerar rättsstaten. Stockholm: Norstedt. 1987. 91-1-873272-0.
- Gripen och oskyldigt dömd : [Pelles lilla röda]. Njurunda: Pelle Svensson. 1991. ISBN 91-630-0840-8.
- Skymningslandet. Bjästa: Cewe-förlaget. 1995. ISBN 91-7542-214-X.
- Sanningens eld, lögnens lågor. Njurunda: Pelle Svensson. 1996. ISBN 91-630-4299-1.
- Sanningen om mordet på Olof Palme. Njurunda: United Books. 1998. ISBN 91-630-6670-X.
- Utan nåd : grymhet utan gräns. Stockholm: Carlsson. 2005. ISBN 91-7203-653-2.
- Quick: den stora rättsskandalen. Stockholm: Blue Publishing. 2009. ISBN 9789197854054.
