= Marek Galiński (wrestler) =

Polish wrestler (1951–1999)

Marek Galiński (13 May 1951 in Wrocław – 28 September 1999 in Wrocław) was a Polish wrestler who competed in the 1980 Summer Olympics.
