= Lorenz Hecher =

German wrestler

Lorenz Hecher (born 1 September 1946 in Giggenhausen) is a German former wrestler who competed in the 1972 Summer Olympics.
