= Said Mustafov =

Bulgarian wrestler (1933–1990)

Olympic medal record

Men's freestyle wrestling

Representing Bulgaria

Olympic Games
Bronze medal – third place	1964 Tokyo	Light-heavyweight

Said Mustafov (Bulgarian: Саид Мустафов; 13 March 1933 – 1990) was a Bulgarian wrestler who competed in the 1964 Summer Olympics and in the 1968 Summer Olympics. He competed in Men's light-weight wrestling.
