= Nicolae Martinescu =

Romanian wrestler (1940–2013)

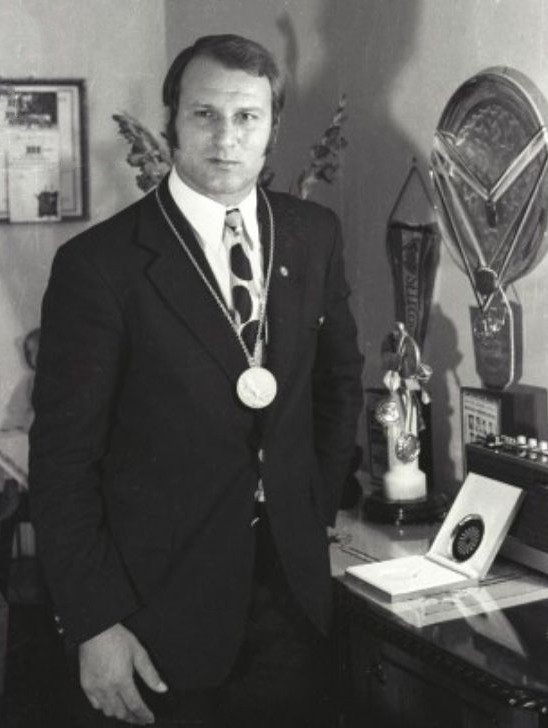

Personal information
- Born: 24 February 1940 Vișani, Romania
- Died: 1 April 2013 (aged 73) Bucharest, Romania
- Height: 183 cm (6 ft 0 in)

Sport
- Sport: Greco-Roman wrestling
- Club: Dunarea Galati; CS Dinamo București
Medal record
Men's Greco-Roman wrestling
Representing Romania
Olympic Games
Bronze medal – third place	1968 Mexico City	97 kg
Gold medal – first place	1972 Munich	100 kg
World Championships
Silver medal – second place	1963 Helsingborg	97 kg
Bronze medal – third place	1966 Toledo	97 kg
Bronze medal – third place	1967 Bucharest	97 kg
Silver medal – second place	1971 Sofia	100 kg
Bronze medal – third place	1974 Katowice	100 kg
European Championships
Gold medal – first place	1966 Essen	97 kg
Bronze medal – third place	1973 Helsinki	97 kg

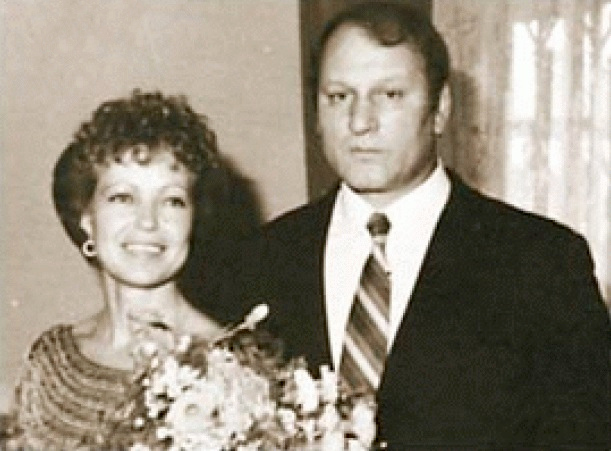
Mioara Velicu and Nicolae Martinescu

Nicolae Martinescu (24 February 1940 – 1 April 2013) was a Greco-Roman wrestler from Romania. He competed at the 1964, 1968, 1972 and 1976 Olympics and won a gold medal in 1972, placing third in 1968 and fourth in 1964. At the 1976 Olympics he served as the flag bearer for Romania at the opening ceremony. Martinescu won a European title in 1966 and five medals at the world championships between 1963 and 1974. Domestically he collected 18 Romanian national titles between 1961 and 1978.

In 1972, he was awarded the title of Merited Master of Sport of the USSR. After retiring from competitions he worked at the Romanian Wrestling Federation. Martinescu died aged 73 in Bucharest.

His wife was folk singer Mioara Velicu.
