= Fredi Albrecht =

German wrestler

Personal information
- Nationality: German
- Born: 23 June 1947 (age 77); Albrechts, Suhl, Thuringia, Germany

Sport
- Sport: Wrestling

Fredi Albrecht (born 23 June 1947 in Albrechts) is a German former wrestler who competed in the 1972 Summer Olympics and in the 1976 Summer Olympics. He has since retired and become a referee.
