= Rudolf Lüscher =

Swiss wrestler

Rudolf Lüscher (24 August 1945 – 2013) was a Swiss wrestler who competed in the 1972 Summer Olympics.
