= Enyu Valchev =

Bulgarian freestyle wrestler

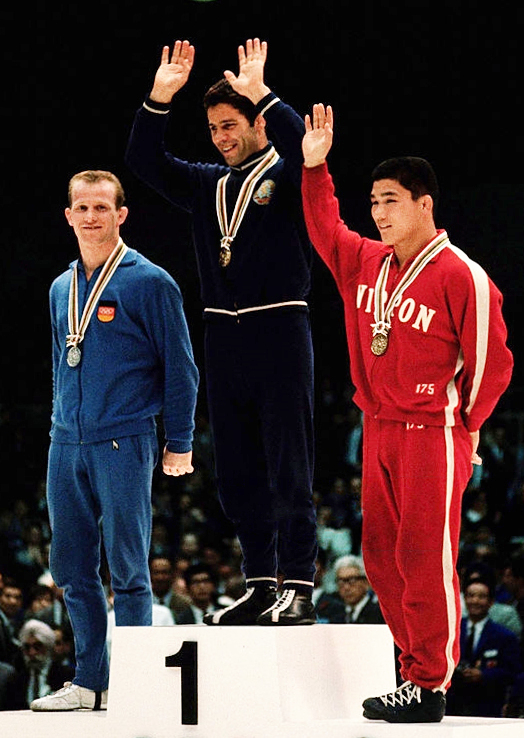
- Enyu Valchev (center) at the 1964 Olympics

Personal information
- Born: 4 January 1936 Polski Gradec, Stara Zagora Province, Bulgaria
- Died: 15 February 2014 (aged 78) Sofia, Bulgaria
- Height: 1.70 m (5 ft 7 in)
- Weight: 67 kg (148 lb)

Sport
- Sport: Freestyle wrestling
- Club: Army Sport Club, Sofia, Minor Dimitrovgrad, Levski-Spartak
Medal record
Men's freestyle wrestling
Representing Bulgaria
Olympic Games
Bronze medal – third place	1960 Rome	Lightweight
Gold medal – first place	1964 Tokyo	Lightweight
Silver medal – second place	1968 Mexico	Lightweight
World Championships
Silver medal – second place	1959 Tehran	67 kg
Gold medal – first place	1962 Toledo	70 kg
Bronze medal – third place	1967 New Delhi	70 kg
Silver medal – second place	1969 Mar del Plata	68 kg
World Cup
Silver medal – second place	1958 Sofia	57 kg
European Championships
Gold medal – first place	1969 Sofia	68 kg
Gold medal – first place	1968 Skopje	70 kg
Bronze medal – third place	1967 Minsk	70 kg

Enyu Valchev Dimov (Bulgarian: Еню Вълчев Димов; 4 January 1936 – 15 February 2014) was a lightweight freestyle wrestler from Bulgaria. He competed at the 1960, 1964 and 1968 Olympics and won a bronze, gold and silver medal, respectively. At the World championships, he won gold in 1962, silvers in 1959 and 1969 and bronze in 1967, while finishing fourth in 1965, fifth in 1966 and sixth in 1963. At the European Championships Valchev won gold medals in 1968 and 1969 and a bronze in 1967. In 1962 Valchev was selected as Bulgarian Sportsperson of the Year.

After finishing his wrestling career, Valchev worked as a coach, and was the head coach of the Bulgarian junior team until his retirement in 1990. In 2005 he was elected to the FILA International Wrestling Hall of Fame.
