= Turkey at the 1964 Summer Olympics =

- IOC code: TUR
- NOC: Turkish National Olympic Committee

in Tokyo
- Flag bearer: Çetin Şahiner
- Medals Ranked 16th: Gold 2 Silver 3 Bronze 1 Total 6

Summer Olympics appearances (overview)
- 1908; 1912; 1920; 1924; 1928; 1932; 1936; 1948; 1952; 1956; 1960; 1964; 1968; 1972; 1976; 1980; 1984; 1988; 1992; 1996; 2000; 2004; 2008; 2012; 2016; 2020; 2024

Other related appearances
- 1906 Intercalated Games

Turkey competed at the 1964 Summer Olympics in Tokyo, Japan.

== Medalists ==
Medal	Name	Sport	Event
Gold	Kazim Ayvaz	Wrestling	Men's Greco-Roman Lightweight
Gold	Ismail Ogan	Wrestling	Men's Freestyle Welterweight
Silver	Hüseyin Akbas	Wrestling	Men's Freestyle Bantamweight
Silver	Hasan Güngör	Wrestling	Men's Freestyle Middleweight
Silver	Ahmet Ayik	Wrestling	Men's Freestyle Light Heavyweight
Bronze	Hamit Kaplan	Wrestling	Men's Freestyle Heavyweight
