= Peter Jutzeler =

Swiss wrestler (1940–2020)

Personal information
- Nationality: Swiss
- Born: 9 May 1940; Erlenbach, Switzerland
- Died: 28 September 2020 (aged 80)

Sport
- Sport: Wrestling

Peter Jutzeler (9 May 1940 – 28 September 2020) was a Swiss wrestler. He competed at the 1964 Summer Olympics and the 1968 Summer Olympics.
