= Boyan Radev =

Bulgarian Greco-Roman wrestler (1942–2025)

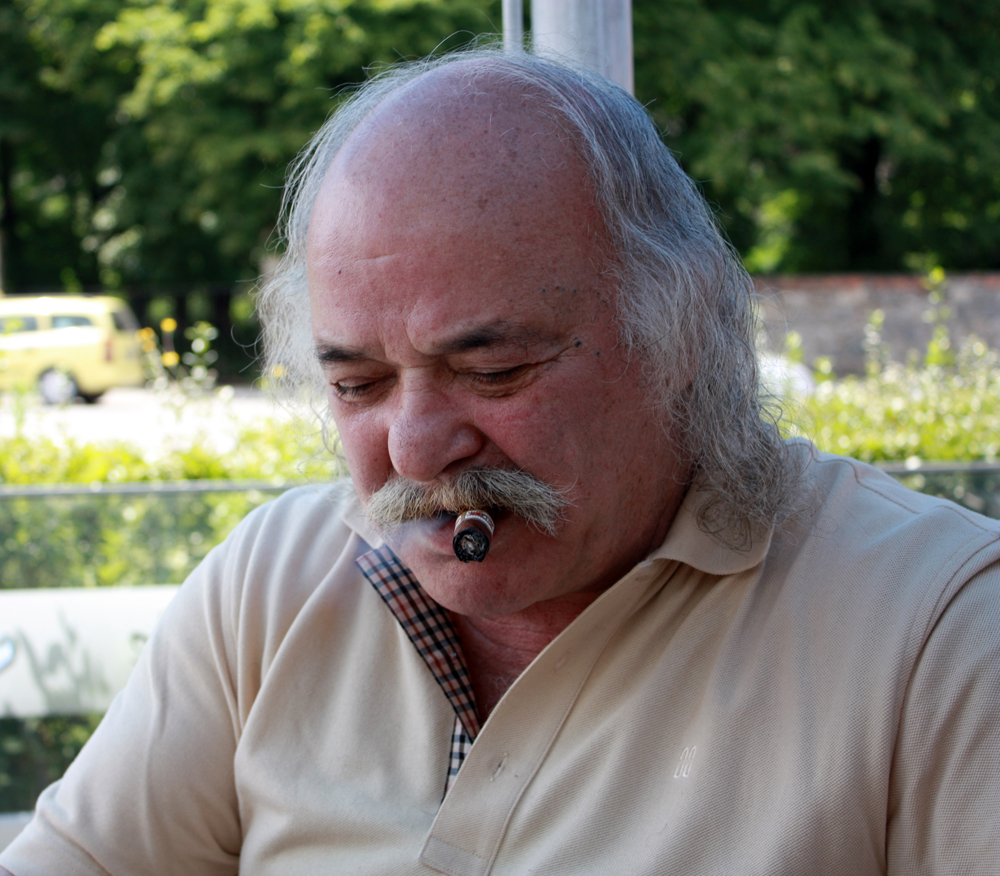
- Radev in 2010

Personal information
- Nationality: Bulgarian
- Born: Boyan Radev Aleksandrov Bulgarian: Боян Радев; 25 February 1942 Moshino (now Pernik), Kingdom of Bulgaria
- Died: 18 December 2025 (aged 83) Sofia, Bulgaria
- Height: 1.76 m (5 ft 9 in)
- Weight: 87–97 kg (192–214 lb)

Sport
- Style: Greco-Roman
- Club: Levski-Spartak
Medal record
Men's Greco-Roman wrestling
Representing Bulgaria
Olympic Games
Gold medal – first place	1964 Tokyo	Light Heavyweight
Gold medal – first place	1968 Mexico	Light Heavyweight
World Championships
Silver medal – second place	1962 Toledo	Light Heavyweight
Gold medal – first place	1966 Toledo	Light Heavyweight
Silver medal – second place	1967 Bucharest	Light Heavyweight
European Championships
Silver medal – second place	1968	Light Heavyweight

Boyan Radev (Bulgarian: Боян Радев; 25 February 1942 – 18 December 2025) was a Bulgarian Greco-Roman wrestler. He was the first Bulgarian two-time Olympic Games champion (1964 Tokyo and 1968 Mexico) and one-time world champion. Radev was also an art collector and artist sponsor.

== Professional wrestling ==
Radev wrestled for Minyor Pernik, Orlin Pirdop, CSKA Sofia and Spartak Sofia.

He was a two-time Olympic gold medalist (1964 and 1968) and a 1966 world champion. He also earned silver medals at the 1962 and 1967 World Cups as well as the 1968 European Championships.

== Death ==
Radev died on 18 December 2025, at the age of 83.

== Ministry of Internal Affairs and Committee for State Security ==
Radev ended his wrestling career shortly after the merger of Spartak Sofia and Levski Sofia in 1971. Thereafter, he worked for the Ministry of Internal Affairs in Bulgaria. He also worked for the Bulgarian Committee for State Security from 1964 onwards. Radev was a colonel at the time of his retirement.

== Art collection ==
As Radev said himself, he became an avid art collector after he was given a painting by the artist Stoyan Illiev. From that point forwards, Radev devoted part of his time to art collecting and philanthropy in Bulgaria. Radev donated all of his wrestling medals as well as his Madara (Bulgarian State Order) and Peter the Great (Russian State Order) to the National Historical Museum (Bulgaria) – making him the number-one donor to the museum.

== Awards ==
Radev was awarded Bulgarian Sportsperson of the Year in 1964, 1967, and 1968. He was given the title Merited Master of Sport of Bulgaria.

He was inducted into the United World Wrestling Greco-Roman Hall of Fame in 2009.

Radev was awarded the Pierre de Coubertin Medal in 2009.

He was elected Levski Sofia Sportsman of the 20th Century.
