= Ferenc Kiss (wrestler) =

Hungarian wrestler (1942–2015)

Personal information
- Born: 5 January 1942 Nick, Hungary
- Died: 8 September 2015 (aged 73)
Medal record
Men's Greco-Roman wrestling
Representing Hungary
Olympic Games
Bronze medal – third place	1972 Munich	Heavyweight

Ferenc Kiss (5 January 1942 – 8 September 2015) was a Hungarian wrestler who competed in the 1964 Summer Olympics, in the 1968 Summer Olympics, and in the 1972 Summer Olympics. He was born in Nick, Hungary.
