= Aimo Mäenpää =

Finnish wrestler (1937–2018)

Aimo Matias Mäenpää (30 January 1937 – 11 April 2018) was a Finnish wrestler who competed in the 1964 Summer Olympics and in the 1972 Summer Olympics.
