= Deaths in May 1994 =

The following is a list of notable deaths in May 1994.

Entries for each day are listed alphabetically by surname. A typical entry lists information in the following sequence:

- Name, age, country of citizenship at birth, subsequent country of citizenship (if applicable), reason for notability, cause of death (if known), and reference.

== May 1994 ==
=== 1 ===
- Nort Billings, 89, American Olympic cross-country skier (1932).
- Gunnar Fredriksen, 87, Norwegian Olympic decathlete (1928).
- Imre Gyöngyössy, 64, Hungarian film director and screenwriter.
- Yigal Mossinson, 76, Israeli novelist, playwright, and inventor.
- Thøger Nordbø, 89, Norwegian footballer.
- Ayrton Senna, 34, Brazilian racing driver, racing accident.
- Arnold Strippel, 82, German Nazi SS commander during World War II.

=== 2 ===
- Nathan Adler, 83, American psychoanalyst and professor of clinical psychology.
- Fahrettin Akbaş, 66-67, Turkish Olympic wrestler (1952).
- Louis Calaferte, 65, French novelist.
- Anita Durante, 96, Italian actress.
- Buck Fausett, 86, American baseball player (Cincinnati Reds), and manager.
- Manfred Kersch, 81, German Olympic sprinter (1936).

=== 3 ===
- Francis Bell, 50, New Zealand actor, suicide.
- William Dickey, 65, American poet and professor of English, AIDS-related complications.
- Vladimir Kostine, 72, Russian basketball referee.
- Herbert Martineau, 79, British Olympic racewalker (1948).
- Felipe Galarza Sánchez, 81, Spanish military officer.
- Neville Stibbard, 70, Australian rules footballer.

=== 4 ===
- Per Engdahl, 85, Swedish far-right politician.
- Roger Jenkins, 82, American-Canadian ice hockey player.
- Lindsay Lamb, 80, Australian rules footballer.
- Kōtō Matsudaira, 91, Japanese diplomat.
- Josip Palada, 82, Yugoslavian tennis player.
- Al Sanders, 44, American basketball player (Virginia Squires).

=== 5 ===
- Joe Byler, 71, American football player (New York Giants).
- Egan Chambers, 73, Canadian politician, member of the House of Commons of Canada (1958-1962).
- Tony DePhillips, 81, American baseball player (Cincinnati Reds).
- Joe Layton, 63, American director and choreographer.
- Harry O'Boyle, 89, American gridiron football player.
- Mário Quintana, 87, Brazilian writer and translator.
- Louise Troy, 60, American actress of stage and screen, breast cancer.
- Noel Wimalasena, 80, Sri Lankan lawyer and politician.

=== 6 ===
- Gunnar Åhs, 78, Swedish bobsledder and Olympian (1952, 1956).
- Rafael Baledón, 74, Mexican film actor, director, screenwriter, and producer.
- Murray Boltinoff, 83, American writer and editor of comic books.
- John Henry Bremridge, 67, Hong Kong politician.
- Mkhitar Djrbashian, 75, Armenian mathematician.
- Ahmed Juffali, 70, Saudi businessman, heart attack.
- Malvina Pastorino, 77, Argentine film actress, fall.
- Moses Rosen, 81, Romanian rabbi.
- Fred Sadoff, 67, American actor, AIDS-related complications.
- Antal Szendey, 79, Hungarian rower and Olympian (1936, 1948).
- Herbert Topp, 94, American Olympic water polo player (1928).

=== 7 ===
- Haim Bar-Lev, 69, Israeli general and politician, cancer.
- Clement Greenberg, 85, American essayist and visual art critic.
- John Thomas Howell, 90, American botanist and taxonomist.
- Mpinga Kasenda, 56, Prime Minister of Zaire under Mobutu Sese Seko, plane crash.
- Pahor Labib, 88, Egyptian egyptologist and coptologist.
- Andy McEvoy, 55, Irish football player.
- Chuck Taylor, 74, American football player and coach.
- Aud Tuten, 80, American-born Canadian ice hockey player (Chicago Black Hawks).
- Aharon Yariv, 73, Israeli politician and general.

=== 8 ===
- Edith Bullock, 91, American businesswoman and politician.
- Einar Diesen, 96, Norwegian journalist and newspaper editor.
- Jim Finks, 66, American football player (Pittsburgh Steelers), coach, and executive (Minnesota Vikings, Chicago Bears, New Orleans Saints), lung cancer.
- Steven Keats, 49, American actor (Death Wish, Black Sunday, Silent Rage), suicide.
- George Peppard, 65, American actor (Breakfast at Tiffany's, The A-Team, The Carpetbaggers), lung cancer.
- Murray Spivack, 90, Russian-American sound engineer.

=== 9 ===
- Anni Albers, 94, American textile artist and printmaker.
- Ralph Brickner, 69, American Major League Baseball player (Boston Red Sox).
- Allan Frost Archer, 86, American entomologist and arachnologist.
- Percy Forrest, 77, American baseball player.
- Bengt Lehander, 68, Swedish Air Force officer.
- Heinz-Werner Meyer, 61, German trade union leader and politician.
- Richard A. Penry, 45, American soldier, Medal of Honor recipient.

=== 10 ===
- Cleanth Brooks, 87, American literary critic and professor.
- Oliver Fletcher, 71, American football player (Los Angeles Dons).
- John Wayne Gacy Jr., 52, American serial killer and sex offender, execution by lethal injection.
- Lucebert, 69, Dutch poet and painter.
- Edward S. Michael, 76, American air force officer, Medal of Honor recipient.
- Elias Motsoaledi, 69, South African anti-apartheid activist.
- Lil Picard, 94, German-American actress, artist, and journalist.

=== 11 ===
- Louis-Thomas Achille, 84, Martiniquais intellectual, educator and musician.
- David Howard Adeney, 82, British missionary and university evangelist.
- S. A. Ajayi, 89, Nigerian statesman.
- Alfred James Broomhall, 82, British missionary in China and author.
- Timothy Carey, 65, American actor (The Killing, Paths of Glory, One-Eyed Jacks), stroke.
- Nikolay Fyodorov, 80, Soviet-Russian animator, director, writer and cartoonist.
- Henri Guisol, 89, French film actor.
- Lloyd Hughes, 81, Australian politician.
- Helmut Käser, 81, Swiss lawyer and general secretary of FIFA.
- Romano Puppo, 61, Italian stuntman and actor, traffic collision.
- Rolands Upatnieks, 61, Soviet Latvian Olympic luger (1976).
- Bennie Warren, 82, American Major League Baseball player (Philadelphia Athletics, New York Giants).

=== 12 ===
- Xen Balaskas, 83, South African cricket player.
- Sir Alfred Beit, 2nd Baronet, 91, British politician, art collector and philanthropist.
- Catherine Berndt, 76, Australian anthropologist.
- Paul Cushing Child, 92, American civil servant, diplomat, and artist.
- Hank D'Amore, 74, Canadian ice hockey player (New York Rangers).
- Erik Erikson, 91, Danish-German-American psychologist and psychoanalyst.
- Si Johnson, 87, American baseball player.
- Roy J. Plunkett, 83, American chemist, cancer.
- John Smith, 55, Scottish politician, heart attack.
- Frank Yokas, 70, American football player.
- André Zwobada, 84, French screenwriter, producer and film director.

=== 13 ===
- Vladimir Antoshin, 64, Soviet/Russian chess Grandmaster.
- Enrique Demarco, 70, Uruguayan Olympic cyclist (1948).
- Ruth Gillette, 87, American actress.
- Duncan Hamilton, 74, British racing driver.
- John Francis Kennedy, 88, American politician.
- Percy Purcell, 82, Australian rules footballer.
- John Swainson, 68, Canadian-American politician and jurist.

=== 14 ===
- Dave Albritton, 81, American Olympic high jumper (1936), coach, and politician.
- Cihat Arman, 78, Turkish football goalkeeper, Olympian (1936, 1948), and manager.
- W. Graham Claytor, Jr., 82, American Navy officer, attorney, and government official.
- Burt Monroe, 63, American ornithologist.
- Antônio Rebello Júnior, 88, Brazilian Olympic rower (1932).
- Brian Roper, 64, British-American actor, and real estate agent.
- Sante Scarcia, 90, Italian Olympic weightlifter (1924).
- Bob Spargo Sr., 80, Australian rules footballer.
- Olga Spiridonović, 70, Serbian actress.
- Leonard Teale, 71, Australian actor, radio announcer, and presenter.
- Robert G. Vosper, 80, American educator and librarian.
- Stan Wittman, 92, Australian rules footballer.

=== 15 ===
- Omprakesh Agrawal, 39, Indian snooker player, cancer.
- Leonard Carpenter, 91, American Olympic rower (1924).
- Royal Dano, 71, American actor (The Outlaw Josey Wales, Killer Klowns from Outer Space, The Right Stuff), heart attack.
- Showboat Fisher, 95, American baseball player (Washington Senators, St. Louis Cardinals, St. Louis Browns).
- Oskar Heil, 86, German electrical engineer and inventor.
- Sherman Landers, 96, American track and field athlete and Olympian (1920).
- Alexander Nove, 78, British professor of Economics.
- Gilbert Roland, 88, Mexican-American actor, cancer.
- Robert T. Secrest, 90, American politician, member of the United States House of Representatives (1933-1942, 1949-1954, 1963-1966).

=== 16 ===
- Val A. Browning, 98, American gunmaker and philanthropist.
- Alain Cuny, 85, French actor in theatre and cinema.
- Dalmiro Finol, 74, Venezuelan baseball player.
- Zdeňka Honsová, 66, Czech Olympic gymnast (1948).
- Phani Majumdar, 82, Indian film director.
- Roy McElroy, 87, New Zealand lawyer and politician.
- Alfred Otto Carl Nier, 82, American physicist.
- Paul Shulman, 72, Israeli Navy officer.
- John Stenner, 29, American cyclist and Olympian (1992).
- Semih Türkdoğan, 81-82, Turkish Olympic sprinter (1928).

=== 17 ===
- Gérson da Silva, 28, Brazilian football player, AIDS-related complications.
- Nicolás Gómez Dávila, 80, Colombian philosopher, cardiovascular disease.
- Leonila Garcia, 87, Filipino pharmacist, First Lady of the Philippines.
- Irène Hamoir, 87, Belgian novelist and poet.
- Étienne Hirsch, 93, French civil engineer and member of the French Resistance during World War II.
- Vladimír Podzimek, 29, Czech ski jumper and Olympian (1984), suicide.
- Gerardo Reichel-Dolmatoff, 82, Austrian anthropologist and archaeologist.
- Bob Sims, 78, American basketball player.
- John Thanos, 45, American convicted murderer, execution by lethal injection.

=== 18 ===
- Harry Barker, 95, New Zealand newspaper journalist and editor.
- John Cramer, 98, Australian politician, heart attack.
- Manuel Manahan, 78, Filipino politician, journalist, and businessman.
- Mamintal A.J. Tamano, 65, Filipino politician statesman.

=== 19 ===
- Joseph Chatt, 79, British chemist.
- Jacques Ellul, 82, French philosopher and sociologist.
- Henry Morgan, 79, American humorist, lung cancer.
- Luis Ocaña, 48, Spanish road bicycle racer, suicide.
- Jacqueline Kennedy Onassis, 64, American socialite, writer, and First Lady of the United States, non-Hodgkin lymphoma.

=== 20 ===
- Bartine Burkett, 96, American film actress, heart attack.
- Fernande Giroux, Canadian actress and jazz singer.
- Ingrid Hafner, 57, British actress, ALS.
- Kasu Brahmananda Reddy, 84, Indian politician.
- Jiří Sobotka, 82, Czechoslovak football player.

=== 21 ===
- Martin Doherty, 35, Irish republican and IRA volunteer, shot.
- Giovanni Goria, 50, Italian politician, lung cancer.
- David S. Holmes Jr., 79, American politician.
- Masayoshi Ito, 80, Japanese politician.
- Norman Low, 80, Scottish football player and manager.
- Ralph Miliband, 70, British sociologist, heart attack.
- Johan Hendrik Weidner, 81, Dutch member of the resistance during World War II.
- Cliff Wilson, 60, Welsh snooker player.

=== 22 ===
- Jane Dulo, 76, American actress and comedian.
- Gerhard Krüger, 85, German Nazi Party student leader and later a neo-Nazi figure.
- Mitacq, 66, Belgian comics author.
- Norman Read, 62, New Zealand racewalker and Olympian (1956, 1960), heart attack.

=== 23 ===
- Al Baldwin, 71, American gridiron football player (Green Bay Packers).
- Ray Candy, 42, American professional wrestler, heart attack.
- Willem Gevers, 83, Dutch nobleman and Olympic bobsledder (1936).
- George de Godzinsky, 79, Russian-Finnish composer and conductor.
- Olav Hauge, 85, Norwegian horticulturist, translator and poet.
- Leo Kuper, 89, South African sociologist.
- George Metesky, 90, American electrician and mechanic.
- Joe Pass, 65, American jazz guitarist, liver cancer.
- Oscar Saul, 81, American screenwriter.
- Joan Vickers, Baroness Vickers, 86, British politician.

=== 24 ===
- Willi Eichhorn, 85, German Olympic rower (1936).
- André Gauthier, 79, Canadian politician, member of the House of Commons of Canada, (1949-1958).
- Martin Goldsmith, 80, American screenwriter and novelist.
- Julien Hébert, 76, Québécois industrial designer.
- Franz Kneissl, 72, Austrian Olympic bobsledder (1952).
- Bill Schutte, 84, American football player and coach.
- John Wain, 69, English poet, novelist, and critic.

=== 25 ===
- Joe Brainard, 52, American artist and writer, AIDS-related complications.
- Eric Gale, 55, American jazz and R&B guitarist, lung cancer.
- John Mackie, Baron John-Mackie, 84, British politician.
- Robert Paverick, 81, Belgian football player.
- Sonny Sharrock, 53, American jazz guitarist, heart attack.

=== 26 ===
- Károly Antal, 84, Hungarian sculptor.
- George Ball, 84, American diplomat and banker.
- Muriel Cooper, 69, American book designer, digital designer, and researcher.
- Shelby Cullom Davis, 85, American businessman, investor, and philanthropist.
- Mayeum Choying Wangmo Dorji, 97, Bhutanese royal and politician.
- Gil Fuller, 74, American jazz arranger, composer and bandleader.
- André Gérard, 83, French football player and manager.
- Jules Keignaert, 86, French Olympic water polo player (1928).
- Hezy Leskly, 41, Israeli poet, choreographer, painter and art critic, AIDS-related complications.
- Pug Lund, 81, American gridiron football player.
- Norberto Menéndez, 57, Argentine football player.
- Robbie Stanley, 26, American auto racing driver, racing accident.
- Red Treadway, 74, American baseball player (New York Giants).

=== 27 ===
- Klaus Beckmann, 49, German politician.
- Charles Rodman Campbell, 39, American convicted murderer, execution by hanging.
- Luis de Carlos, 87, Spanish football executive.
- Lakshman Shastri Joshi, 93, Indian writer, scholar, and literary critic.
- George Melinkovich, 82, American football player and coach.
- Red Rodney, 66, American jazz trumpeter, lung cancer.
- Art Spinney, 66, American football player (Baltimore Colts).

=== 28 ===
- Julius Boros, 74, American golfer, heart attack.
- James Burke, 67, American prelate of the Catholic Church.
- Daniel Flood, 90, American attorney and politician, member of the United States House of Representatives (1945-1947, 1949-1953, 1955-1980).
- Thomas Henry Goode, 60, Canadian politician, member of the House of Commons of Canada (1968-1972).
- Geoff Mandy, 74, South African Olympic diver (1948).
- Lucienne Pageot-Rousseaux, 95, French painter.
- Zainulabedin Gulamhusain Rangoonwala, 80, Indian activist and banker.
- Ray Scriven, 82, Australian rules footballer.
- Hugh Stirling, 86, Canadian football player.
- Max Walter Svanberg, 82, Swedish painter, illustrator, and designer.
- Branislav Varsik, 90, Slovak historian and archivist.

=== 29 ===
- José Bohr, 92, German-Chilean film director, producer, actor and screenwriter.
- Peter Cranmer, 79, English sportsman.
- Raymond Fellay, 62, Swiss Olympic alpine skier (1956).
- Erich Honecker, 81, German communist politician and leader of the GDR, liver cancer.
- Oliver Jackson, 61, American jazz drummer, heart failure.
- Joseph Janni, 78, British film producer.
- Harry Levin, 81, American literary critic and scholar.
- Áskell Löve, 77, Icelandic botanist.
- Pat Phillips, 66, Australian rules footballer.
- Wojciech Rutkowski, 58, Polish Olympic volleyball player (1968).
- Lady May Abel Smith, 88, British noblewoman.

=== 30 ===
- Malouf Abraham, 78, American businessman and politician.
- Serge Afanasyan, 81, Armenian historian.
- Ezra Taft Benson, 94, American farmer, government official, and religious leader, heart failure.
- Marcel Bich, 79, Italian-French industrialist and co-founder of Bic.
- Agostino Di Bartolomei, 39, Italian football player, suicide.
- Ove Gunnarsson, 48, Swedish Olympic sports shooter (1976, 1980, 1984).
- Donald Hill, 71, British engineer and historian of science and technology.
- Dirk Köhler, 26, German Olympic sports shooter (1988).
- Jack Krol, 57, American baseball coach and manager, cancer.
- Juan Carlos Onetti, 84, Uruguayan novelist and author of short stories, heart attack.
- Juzo Sanada, 71, Japanese baseball player.
- Pavle Savić, 85, Serbian physicist and chemist.
- István Tamássy, 83, Hungarian football player.

=== 31 ===
- Frank Beck, 51, English convicted child sex offender, heart attack.
- Mbaye Diagne, 36, Senegalese military officer, killed in action.
- Doug Freeman, 79, New Zealand cricketer.
- Sidney Gilliat, 86, English film director, producer and writer.
- Manny Klein, 86, American jazz trumpeter.
- Herva Nelli, 85, Italian-American operatic soprano, leukemia.
- Samta Prasad, 72, Indian classical musician and tabla player.
- Henri Woode, 84, American composer, lyricist, arranger, and singer.
- Hannah Marie Wormington, 79, American archaeologist.
