= Deaths in March 1994 =

The following is a list of notable deaths in March 1994.

Entries for each day are listed alphabetically by surname. A typical entry lists information in the following sequence:

- Name, age, country of citizenship at birth, subsequent country of citizenship (if applicable), reason for notability, cause of death (if known), and reference.

== March 1994 ==
=== 1 ===
- Manmohan Desai, 57, Indian film producer and director.
- Eliseo Diego, 74, Cuban poet and writer of short stories.
- Hennie Dijkstra, 81, Dutch footballer.
- Herschel Friday, 72, American lawyer, plane crash.
- Ludwig Günderoth, 83, German football player and manager.
- Alexei Haieff, 79, American composer of orchestral and choral works.
- Herbert Schade, 71, German long-distance runner and Olympian (1952, 1956).
- Dallas Shirley, 80, American basketball referee.
- Armonía Somers, 79, Uruguayan feminist, pedagogue, and novelist.
- Tim Souster, 51, British composer and writer on music.
- Ethel Terrell, 68, American politician.
- Joe Tipton, 72, American baseball player.

=== 2 ===
- Kleggie Hermsen, 70, American basketball player.
- Walter Kent, 82, American composer and conductor.
- Giuseppe La Loggia, 82, Italian politician, lawyer and teacher.
- Donald M. MacKinnon, 80, Scottish philosopher and theologian.
- Anita Morris, 50, American actress, singer and dancer, ovarian cancer.
- Butch Sutcliffe, 78, American baseball player (Boston Bees).
- Yevgeniya Zhigulenko, 73, Soviet pilot and navigator during World War II and Hero of the Soviet Union.

=== 3 ===
- Bob Crisp, 82, South African cricketer.
- Roman Haubenstock-Ramati, 75, Composer and music editor.
- Rune Källqvist, 64, Swedish Olympic water polo player (1952).
- Karel Kryl, 49, Czechoslovak poet, singer-songwriter and activist, heart attack.
- Bilge Olgaç, 54, Turkish film director.
- Ezra Stone, 76, American actor and director, traffic collision.
- Lars Widding, 69, Swedish author and journalist.
- John Edward Williams, 71, American author, editor and professor.
- Gary Wood, 52, American gridiron football player (New York Giants, New Orleans Saints).

=== 4 ===
- Gianni Agus, 76, Italian actor.
- Aníbal, 53, Mexican Luchador (professional wrestler), brain cancer.
- Sándor Békési, 65, Hungarian Olympic gymnast (1960).
- Will Berzinski, 59, American football player (Philadelphia Eagles).
- Louis Brower, 93, American baseball player (Detroit Tigers).
- John Candy, 43, Canadian actor (Planes, Trains and Automobiles, Spaceballs, Uncle Buck) and comedian, Emmy winner (1982, 1983), heart attack.
- George Edward Hughes, 75, Irish-New Zealand philosopher and logician.
- Marie-Joseph Lemieux, 91, Canadian Catholic archbishop and Holy See diplomat.
- Brian McCowage, 58, Australian Olympic fencer (1956, 1960, 1964).
- Ross Treleaven, 86-87, Australian rules footballer.

=== 5 ===
- Abdullah as-Sallal, 77, President of the Yemen Arab Republic.
- Joseph Birdsell, 85, American anthropologist.
- Arnold Brown, 66, Canadian politician.
- Jan Dobraczyński, 83, Polish writer, novelist, and politician.
- Conrad Heidkamp, 88, German footballer and Olympian (1928).
- Abd El-Karim Sakr, 75, Egyptian football player and Olympian (1936, 1948).

=== 6 ===
- Tengiz Abuladze, 70, Georgian film director, screenwriter, and theatre teacher.
- Mane Bajić, 52, Serbian midfielder, traffic collision.
- Larry Eyler, 41, American serial killer, AIDS-related complications.
- Yvonne Fair, 51, American singer, cancer.
- George Heath, 81, English cricketer.
- Melina Mercouri, 73, Greek actress, singer, activist and politician, cancer.
- Tony Momsen, 66, American gridiron football player (Pittsburgh Steelers, Washington Redskins).
- Ken Noritake, 71, Japanese football player.

=== 7 ===
- Ray Arcel, 94, American boxing trainer.
- Fortunato Arena, 71, Italian stuntman and actor.
- James Hannigan, 65, Irish-prelate of the Roman Catholic Church.
- Stew Hofferth, 81, American baseball player (Boston Braves).
- Lindsay Tipping, 43, Australian rules footballer.

=== 8 ===
- Mervyn Brogan, 79, Australian Army general.
- Leonard K. Carson, 70, American Air Force fighter ace.
- Rosemary Du Cros, 92, British aviation pioneer.
- John Ewart, 66, Australian actor, head and neck cancer.
- Uberto Gillarduzzi, 84, Italian bobsledder and Olympian (1936, 1952).
- Knut Haukelid, 82, Norwegian military officer.
- Eufrosinia Kersnovskaya, 86, Russian memoirist and Gulag prisoner.
- Yvonne Martin, 82, French film editor.
- Brian McGowan, 58, Australian politician.
- Jack Spector, 65, American radio DJ and TV host, heart attack.

=== 9 ===
- Zoltán Beke, 82, Romanian football player and coach.
- Sándor Békési, 65, Hungarian Olympic gymnast (1960).
- Karl Wilhelm Berkhan, 78, German politician.
- Wilhelm Brese, 97, German politician and member of the Bundestag.
- Charles Bukowski, 73, German-American poet, novelist, and short story writer, leukemia.
- Paul Dubreil, 90, French mathematician.
- Elbie Fletcher, 77, American baseball player (Boston Braves/Bees, Pittsburgh Pirates).
- Bernie Fyffe, 72, Australian rules footballer.
- Jon Kimche, 84, Swiss-British journalist and historian.
- Moe Purtill, 77, American swing jazz drummer.
- Devika Rani, 85, Indian actress.
- Fernando Rey, 76, Spanish actor, bladder cancer.
- Gilbert Rondeau, 66, Canadian politician, member of the House of Commons of Canada (1962-1965, 1968-1979).
- Lawrence E. Spivak, 93, American publisher and journalist.

=== 10 ===
- Roger Bocquet, 72, Swiss football player.
- Jim Brenneman, 53, American baseball player (New York Yankees).
- Rupert Bruce-Mitford, 79, British archaeologist and scholar.
- Aurelio Galleppini, 76, Italian comics artist and illustrator.
- Jim Honochick, 76, American baseball umpire.
- Pierre-Olivier Lapie, 92, French essayist and novelist.
- Östen Sandström, 83, Swedish Olympic sprinter (1936).
- Robert Shea, 61, American novelist and journalist.

=== 11 ===
- Charlie Bivins, 55, American gridiron football player (Chicago Bears, Pittsburgh Steelers Buffalo Bills).
- Fausta Cialente, 95, Italian novelist, journalist and political activist.
- Evelyn Gardner, 90, British socialite.
- Aldo Puccinelli, 73, Italian football player and manager.
- Kaku Takashina, 75, Japanese actor.
- Brenda Wootton, 66, English folk singer and poet.

=== 12 ===
- Gordy Coleman, 59, American baseball player (Cleveland Indians, Cincinnati Reds).
- Philippe Daudy, 68, French member of the French Resistance, journalist, and novelist.
- Frank Gorrell, 66, American politician, choking incident.
- Don Joseph, 70, American jazz musician.
- Mehmed Orhan, 84, Ottoman prince and head of the Ottoman dynasty.

=== 13 ===
- Danny Barker, 85, American jazz musician, vocalist, and author .
- Jean Gourguet, 91, French film director, screenwriter and film producer.
- Sam Ranzino, 66, American college and basketball player (NC State Wolfpack, Rochester Royals).
- Martha Esther Rogers, 79, American nurse, theorist, and author.
- Buddy Rosar, 79, American baseball player.
- Eva Gräfin Finck von Finckenstein, 90, American politician.
- John Yeon, 83, American architect, heart failure.

=== 14 ===
- Tei Abal, 61-62, Papua New Guinean politician.
- Sally Belfrage, 57, American writer and journalist, cancer.
- Serge Blusson, 65, French cyclist and Olympian (1948).
- Tony Freitas, 85, American baseball player (Philadelphia Athletics, Cincinnati Reds).
- Otto Hartmann, 90, Austrian stage and film actor.
- Sheila Humphreys, 95, Irish political activist.
- Willie Hobbs Moore, 59, American physicist and engineer, cancer.
- Floyd Reid, 66, American gridiron football player.
- Indra Sen, 90, Indian psychologist.
- Georges Claes sr., 74, Belgian racing cyclist.

=== 15 ===
- Bill Green, 53, American basketball player.
- Jack Hargreaves, 82, English television presenter and writer.
- M. K. Indira, 77, Indian novelist.
- Tom Kirk, 77, Australian rugby player.
- Josef Kohout, 79, Austrian Nazi concentration camp survivor and author.
- Jürgen Manger, 71, German actor and comedian.
- Floyd Reid, 66, American football player (Green Bay Packers).

=== 16 ===
- Albert Bühlmann, 70, Swiss physician, heart failure.
- Janet Chandler, 82, American actress and model.
- Nicolas Flagello, 66, American composer and conductor of classical music.
- Bill Harp, 70, American set decorator.
- Richard Nugent, Baron Nugent of Guildford, 86, British politician.
- Mykola Kudrytsky, 31, Ukrainian football player, traffic collision.
- Eric Show, 37, American Major League Baseball player (San Diego Padres, Oakland Athletics), drug overdose.
- Kantarō Suga, 59, Japanese actor, traffic accident.

=== 17 ===
- Kalyan Bulchand Advani, 82, Indian poet, critic, and scholar.
- Charlotte Auerbach, 94, German geneticist.
- Wilson Homer Elkins, 85, American educator and university administrator.
- Cliff Goldstraw, 78, Australian rules footballer.
- Walter Janka, 79, German communist, political activist and writer.
- Elenjikal Chandy Kuruvila, 71, Indian Navy flag officer.
- Ellsworth Vines, 82, American tennis champion
- Mai Zetterling, 68, Swedish actress, novelist and film director, cancer.

=== 18 ===
- Mehboob Alam, 46, Pakistani actor.
- William Bergsma, 72, American composer and teacher, heart attack.
- Peter Borgelt, 66, German television actor, cancer.
- Yehia Chahine, 76, Egyptian film producer and actor.
- Andrew Crawford, 76, Scottish actor.
- David Ginsburg, 73, British politician.
- Erwin Kohn, 82, Austrian table tennis player.
- Günter Mittag, 67, German politician.

=== 19 ===
- Rafig Babayev, 56, Azerbaijani jazz musician and author of scores for films, terrorist attack.
- José Coronel Hurtecho, 88, Nicaraguan poet, critic, playwright, and diplomat.
- Jim Lawrence, 75, American author.
- Josef Meixner, 85, German theoretical physicist.
- Charles Paris, 82, American comic book artist.
- Milt Piepul, 75, American football player (Detroit Lions), and coach.
- Mel Rudd, 80, Australian rules footballer.
- Benjamin Clemens Stone, 60, British–American botanist.

=== 20 ===
- Ilaria Alpi, 32, Italian journalist, killed in ambush.
- IJke Buisma, 86, Dutch Olympic high jumper (1928).
- Irvin Flores, 69, Puerto Rican political activist.
- Lewis Grizzard, 47, American writer and humorist.
- Reg Groth, 80, Australian politician.
- Miran Hrovatin, 44, Italian photographer and camera operator, killed in ambush.
- Alfonso Rodríguez Salas, 54, Spanish football player, colorectal cancer.

=== 21 ===
- John Thomas Blackburn, 82, American naval aviator and flying ace.
- Macdonald Carey, 81, American actor (Days of Our Lives, Shadow of a Doubt, Lock-Up), lung cancer.
- Lili Damita, 89, French-American actress and singer, Alzheimer's disease.
- Cornelia Gilissen, 78, American Olympic diver (1936).
- Franz Pelikan, 68, Austrian football goalkeeper and Olympian (1948).
- Dack Rambo, 52, American actor (Dallas, The Guns of Will Sonnett, The Loretta Young Show), AIDS-related complications.

=== 22 ===
- Dan Hartman, 43, American musician and record producer, AIDS-related complications.
- Horton Holcombe Hobbs, Jr., 79, American taxonomist and carcinologist.
- Ilse Hornung, 85, Austrian figure skater and Olympian (1928).
- Walter Lantz, 94, American cartoonist and animator (Woody Woodpecker), heart failure.
- Ulrich Poltera, 71, Swiss Olympic ice hockey player (1948, 1952).

=== 23 ===
- Luis Donaldo Colosio, 44, Mexican economist and politician, homicide.
- Nancy Cárdenas, 59, Mexican actor, poet, writer and feminist.
- Álvaro del Portillo, 80, Spanish Roman Catholic bishop and prelate of Opus Dei.
- Giulietta Masina, 73, Italian film actress, lung cancer.
- Goar Mestre, 81, Cuban-Argentine businessman, cancer.
- Jack Norman, 84, Australian rules footballer.
- Bob Richards, 38, American meteorologist, suicide by plane crash.
- Donald Swann, 70, Welsh musician, singer and entertainer, cancer.
- Paula Trueman, 96, American actress (The Outlaw Josey Wales, Dirty Dancing, Moonstruck).
- Valentina Vladimirova, 66, Ukrainian-Russian actress.
- Roger Wolff, 82, American baseball player.

=== 24 ===
- Zbigniew Gołąb, 71, Polish-American linguist and slavist.
- Hans Jakob, 85, German football player and Olympian (1936).
- John L. May, 71, American Roman Catholic archbishop, brain cancer.
- Walle Nauta, 77, Dutch-American neuroscientist.
- Edith Porada, 81, Austrian-American art historian and archaeologist.
- David van Vactor, 87, American composer of contemporary classical music.
- Jiang Yizhen, 79, Chinese communist politician.

=== 25 ===
- Rudi Feld, 97, German art director and set designer.
- Angelines Fernández, 69, Spanish-Mexican actress and comedian, lung cancer.
- Bob Fontaine Sr., 70, American baseball player, scout and executive.
- Bernard Kangro, 83, Estonian writer and poet.
- Max Petitpierre, 95, Swiss politician and jurist.
- Jesus M. Vargas, 89, Filipino politician.

=== 26 ===
- Emma Bosch, 23, Spanish Olympic alpine skier (1992).
- Dame Whina Cooper, 98, New Zealand Māori leader.
- Wadad Hamdi, 70, Egyptian actress, stabbed.
- Willi Kirschner, 82, Romanian Olympic handball player (1936).
- Owen McCann, 86, South African Catholic cardinal and journalist.
- Margaret Millar, 79, American-Canadian writer.

=== 27 ===
- Otto Bonsema, 84, Dutch football player and manager.
- Frances Donaldson, Baroness Donaldson of Kingsbridge, 87, British writer and biographer.
- Elisabeth Schmid, 81, German archaeologist and osteologist.
- Lawrence Wetherby, 86, American politician.

=== 28 ===
- Richard Brandram, 82, British Army officer.
- Albert Goldman, 66, American academic and author.
- Ștefan Gușă, 53, Romanian general, cancer.
- Eugène Ionesco, 84, Romanian-French playwright.
- Cyrus Longworth Lundell, 86, American botanist.
- Ira Murchison, 61, American sprinter and Olympic champion (1956), cancer.
- Wendell Niles, 89, American radio and television announcer, cancer.

=== 29 ===
- Ray Bare, 44, American baseball player (St. Louis Cardinals, Detroit Tigers).
- Paul Grimault, 89, French animator.
- Lynda Hull, 39, American poet, car accident.
- William Huston Natcher, 84, American politician, member of the United States House of Representatives (1953-).
- Charles Oser, 92, Swiss politician.
- Bill Travers, 72, British actor, screenwriter, and animal rights activist.
- Jiang Zehan, 91, Chinese mathematician.

=== 30 ===
- Louis Fauconnier, 78, Belgian Olympic modern pentathlete (1948).
- Ina Hooft, 100, Dutch painter.
- Leslie Howard Saunders, 94, Canadian politician and Mayor of Toronto.
- William Arthur Ward, 72, American motivational writer.
- Sid Weiss, 79, American jazz double-bassist.

=== 31 ===
- Léon Degrelle, 87, Belgian politician and nazi collaborator, heart attack.
- Henri Gouhier, 94, French philosopher and literary critic.
- William Henry Hance, 42, American soldier and serial killer, execution by electrocution.
- Medea Japaridze, 71, Soviet/Georgian actress.
- Béla Kenéz, 71, Hungarian Olympic wrestler (1952).
- Mohibullah "Mo" Khan, 56, Pakistani squash player.
- José Escobar Saliente, 85, Spanish comic book writer and artist.
