= Wrestling at the 1960 Summer Olympics – Men's Greco-Roman flyweight =

Wrestling at the Olympics

Men's Greco-Roman flyweight at the Games of the XVII Olympiad
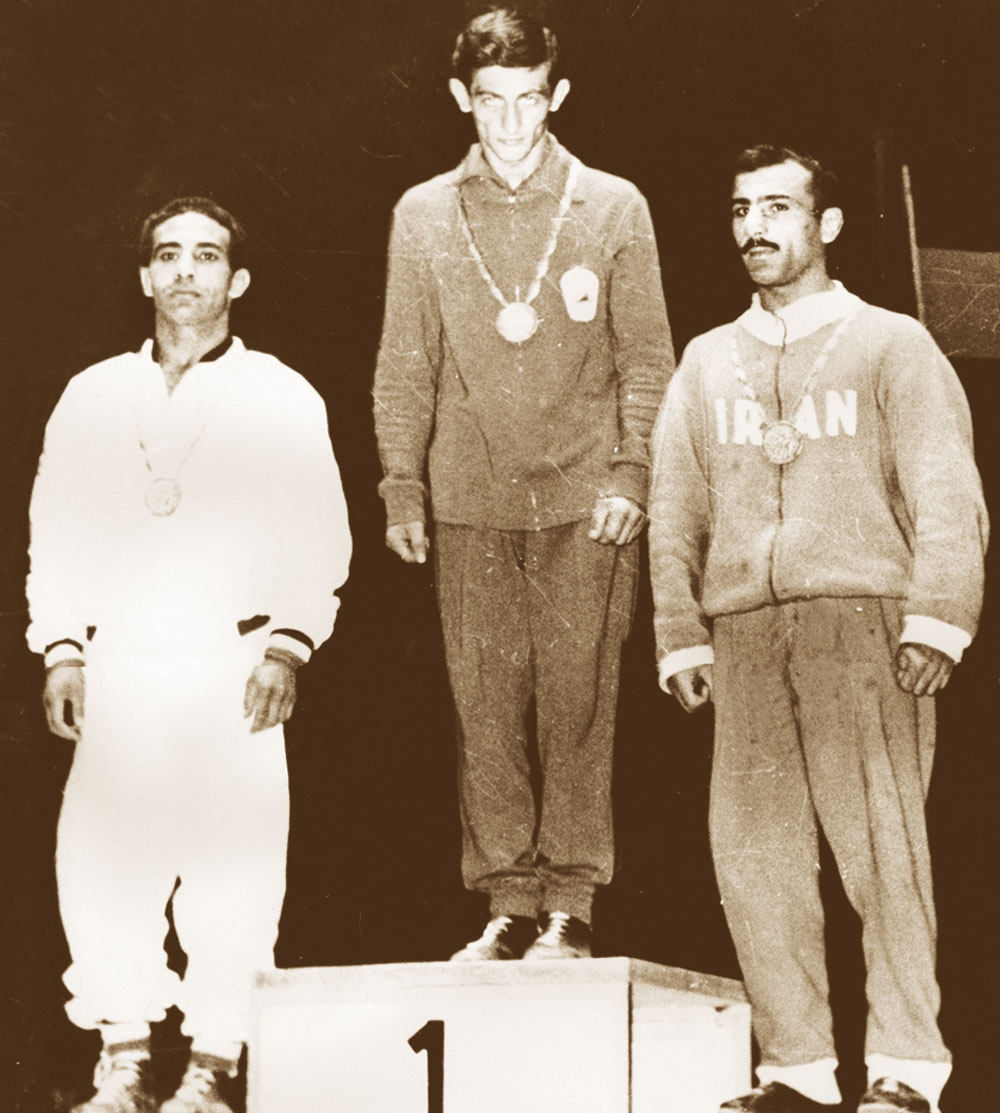
- Venue: Basilica of Maxentius
- Dates: 26–31 August 1960
- Competitors: 18 from 18 nations

Medalists
1st place, gold medalist(s)		Dumitru Pârvulescu	Romania
2nd place, silver medalist(s)		Osman El-Sayed	United Arab Republic
3rd place, bronze medalist(s)		Mohamed Paziraie	Iran

The men's Greco-Roman flyweight competition at the 1960 Summer Olympics in Rome took place from 26 to 31 August at the Basilica of Maxentius. Nations were limited to one competitor. Flyweight was the lightest category, including wrestlers weighing up to 52 kilograms (114.6 lb).

== Competition format ==
This Greco-Roman wrestling competition continued to use the "bad points" elimination system introduced at the 1928 Summer Olympics for Greco-Roman and at the 1932 Summer Olympics for freestyle wrestling, though adjusted the point values slightly. Wins by fall continued to be worth 0 points and wins by decision continued to be worth 1 point. Losses by fall, however, were now worth 4 points (up from 3). Losses by decision were worth 3 points (consistent with most prior years, though in some losses by split decision had been worth only 2 points). Ties were now allowed, worth 2 points for each wrestler. The elimination threshold was also increased from 5 points to 6 points. The medal round concept, used in 1952 and 1956 requiring a round-robin amongst the medalists even if one or more finished a round with enough points for elimination, was used only if exactly three wrestlers remained after a round—if two competitors remained, they faced off head-to-head; if only one, he was the gold medalist.

== Results ==
=== Round 1 ===
Bouts

Winner	Nation	Victory Type	Loser	Nation
Ivan Kochergin	Soviet Union	Fall	Kazim Gedik	Turkey
Dumitru Pârvulescu	Romania	Decision	Dick Wilson	United States
Franz Burkhard	Switzerland	Fall	Werner Hartmann	Austria
Borivoj Vukov	Yugoslavia	Tie	Bengt Frännfors	Sweden
Takashi Hirata	Japan	Fall	Georgi Moskov	Bulgaria
Ignazio Fabra	Italy	Decision	Fritz Stange	United Team of Germany
Heikki Hakola	Finland	Tie	Stefan Hajduk	Poland
Mohamed Paziraie	Iran	Decision	Maurice Mewis	Belgium
Osman El-Sayed	United Arab Republic	Decision	Jørgen Jensen	Denmark

Points

Rank	Wrestler	Nation	Start	Earned	Total
1	Franz Burkhard	Switzerland	0	0	0
1	Takashi Hirata	Japan	0	0	0
1	Ivan Kochergin	Soviet Union	0	0	0
4	Osman El-Sayed	United Arab Republic	0	1	1
4	Ignazio Fabra	Italy	0	1	1
4	Dumitru Pârvulescu	Romania	0	1	1
4	Mohamed Paziraie	Iran	0	1	1
8	Bengt Frännfors	Sweden	0	2	2
8	Stefan Hajduk	Poland	0	2	2
8	Heikki Hakola	Finland	0	2	2
8	Borivoj Vukov	Yugoslavia	0	2	2
12	Jørgen Jensen	Denmark	0	3	3
12	Maurice Mewis	Belgium	0	3	3
12	Fritz Stange	United Team of Germany	0	3	3
12	Dick Wilson	United States	0	3	3
16	Kazim Gedik	Turkey	0	4	4
16	Werner Hartmann	Austria	0	4	4
16	Georgi Moskov	Bulgaria	0	4	4

=== Round 2 ===
Bouts

Winner	Nation	Victory Type	Loser	Nation
Dumitru Pârvulescu	Romania	Fall	Kazim Gedik	Turkey
Ivan Kochergin	Soviet Union	Tie	Dick Wilson	United States
Borivoj Vukov	Yugoslavia	Fall	Franz Burkhard	Switzerland
Bengt Frännfors	Sweden	Fall	Werner Hartmann	Austria
Georgi Moskov	Bulgaria	Decision	Fritz Stange	United Team of Germany
Ignazio Fabra	Italy	Decision	Takashi Hirata	Japan
Maurice Mewis	Belgium	Fall	Heikki Hakola	Finland
Stefan Hajduk	Poland	Decision	Jørgen Jensen	Denmark
Osman El-Sayed	United Arab Republic	Decision	Mohamed Paziraie	Iran

Points

Rank	Wrestler	Nation	Start	Earned	Total
1	Dumitru Pârvulescu	Romania	1	0	1
2	Osman El-Sayed	United Arab Republic	1	1	2
2	Ignazio Fabra	Italy	1	1	2
2	Bengt Frännfors	Sweden	2	0	2
2	Ivan Kochergin	Soviet Union	0	2	2
2	Borivoj Vukov	Yugoslavia	2	0	2
7	Stefan Hajduk	Poland	2	1	3
7	Takashi Hirata	Japan	0	3	3
7	Maurice Mewis	Belgium	3	0	3
10	Franz Burkhard	Switzerland	0	4	4
10	Mohamed Paziraie	Iran	1	3	4
12	Georgi Moskov	Bulgaria	4	1	5
12	Dick Wilson	United States	3	2	5
14	Heikki Hakola	Finland	2	4	6
14	Jørgen Jensen	Denmark	3	3	6
14	Fritz Stange	United Team of Germany	3	3	6
17	Kazim Gedik	Turkey	4	4	8
17	Werner Hartmann	Austria	4	4	8

=== Round 3 ===
Bouts

Winner	Nation	Victory Type	Loser	Nation
Ivan Kochergin	Soviet Union	Tie	Dumitru Pârvulescu	Romania
Dick Wilson	United States	Fall	Franz Burkhard	Switzerland
Borivoj Vukov	Yugoslavia	Decision	Georgi Moskov	Bulgaria
Takashi Hirata	Japan	Decision	Bengt Frännfors	Sweden
Ignazio Fabra	Italy	Decision	Maurice Mewis	Belgium
Mohamed Paziraie	Iran	Decision	Stefan Hajduk	Poland
Osman El-Sayed	United Arab Republic	Bye	N/A	N/A

Points

Rank	Wrestler	Nation	Start	Earned	Total
1	Osman El-Sayed	United Arab Republic	2	0	2
2	Ignazio Fabra	Italy	2	1	3
2	Dumitru Pârvulescu	Romania	1	2	3
2	Borivoj Vukov	Yugoslavia	2	1	3
5	Takashi Hirata	Japan	3	1	4
5	Ivan Kochergin	Soviet Union	2	2	4
7	Bengt Frännfors	Sweden	2	3	5
7	Mohamed Paziraie	Iran	4	1	5
7	Dick Wilson	United States	5	0	5
10	Stefan Hajduk	Poland	3	3	6
10	Maurice Mewis	Belgium	3	3	6
12	Franz Burkhard	Switzerland	4	4	8
12	Georgi Moskov	Bulgaria	5	3	8

=== Round 4 ===
Bouts

Winner	Nation	Victory Type	Loser	Nation
Ivan Kochergin	Soviet Union	Decision	Osman El-Sayed	United Arab Republic
Dumitru Pârvulescu	Romania	Decision	Borivoj Vukov	Yugoslavia
Takashi Hirata	Japan	Fall	Dick Wilson	United States
Bengt Frännfors	Sweden	Tie	Ignazio Fabra	Italy
Mohamed Paziraie	Iran	Bye	N/A	N/A

Points

Rank	Wrestler	Nation	Start	Earned	Total
1	Takashi Hirata	Japan	4	0	4
1	Dumitru Pârvulescu	Romania	3	1	4
3	Osman El-Sayed	United Arab Republic	2	3	5
3	Ignazio Fabra	Italy	3	2	5
3	Ivan Kochergin	Soviet Union	4	1	5
3	Mohamed Paziraie	Iran	5	0	5
7	Borivoj Vukov	Yugoslavia	3	3	6
8	Bengt Frännfors	Sweden	5	2	7
9	Dick Wilson	United States	5	4	9

=== Round 5 ===
Pârvulescu was the only wrestler left with fewer than 6 points; he took the gold medal. The tie in the standings between El-Sayed and Paziraie at 6 points for the silver medal was resolved by head-to-head results; El-Sayed had defeated Paziraie in round 2, so took silver.

Bouts

Winner	Nation	Victory Type	Loser	Nation
Mohamed Paziraie	Iran	Decision	Ivan Kochergin	Soviet Union
Osman El-Sayed	United Arab Republic	Decision	Takashi Hirata	Japan
Dumitru Pârvulescu	Romania	Decision	Ignazio Fabra	Italy

Points

Rank	Wrestler	Nation	Start	Earned	Total
1st place, gold medalist(s)	Dumitru Pârvulescu	Romania	4	1	5
2nd place, silver medalist(s)	Osman El-Sayed	United Arab Republic	5	1	6
3rd place, bronze medalist(s)	Mohamed Paziraie	Iran	5	1	6
4	Takashi Hirata	Japan	4	3	7
5	Ignazio Fabra	Italy	5	3	8
5	Ivan Kochergin	Soviet Union	5	3	8
