= Wrestling at the 1956 Summer Olympics – Men's Greco-Roman flyweight =

Men's Greco-Roman flyweight at the Games of the XVI Olympiad
- Venue: Royal Exhibition Building
- Dates: 3–6 December 1956
- Competitors: 11 from 11 nations

Medalists
1st place, gold medalist(s)		Nikolay Solovyov	Soviet Union
2nd place, silver medalist(s)		Ignazio Fabra	Italy
3rd place, bronze medalist(s)		Dursun Ali Eğribaş	Turkey

The men's Greco-Roman flyweight competition at the 1956 Summer Olympics in Melbourne took place from 3 December to 6 December at the Royal Exhibition Building. Nations were limited to one competitor. Flyweight was the lightest category, including wrestlers weighing up to 52 kilograms (114.6 lb).

== Competition format ==
This Greco-Roman wrestling competition continued to use the "bad points" elimination system introduced at the 1928 Summer Olympics for Greco-Roman and at the 1932 Summer Olympics for freestyle wrestling, as modified in 1952 (adding medal rounds and making all losses worth 3 points—from 1936 to 1948 losses by split decision only cost 2). Each round featured all wrestlers pairing off and wrestling one bout (with one wrestler having a bye if there were an odd number). The loser received 3 points. The winner received 1 point if the win was by decision and 0 points if the win was by fall. At the end of each round, any wrestler with at least 5 points was eliminated. This elimination continued until the medal rounds, which began when 3 wrestlers remained. These 3 wrestlers each faced each other in a round-robin medal round (with earlier results counting, if any had wrestled another before); record within the medal round determined medals, with bad points breaking ties.

== Results ==
=== Round 1 ===
Bouts

Winner	Nation	Victory Type	Loser	Nation
István Baranya	Hungary	Decision, 3–0	Borivoj Vukov	Yugoslavia
Maurice Mewis	Belgium	Fall	Monty Hakansson	Australia
Ignazio Fabra	Italy	Decision, 2–1	Dursun Ali Eğribaş	Turkey
Dick Wilson	United States	Decision, 3–0	André Zoete	France
Nikolay Solovyov	Soviet Union	Decision, 2–1	Dumitru Pîrvulescu	Romania
Bengt Johansson	Sweden	Bye	N/A	N/A

Points

Rank	Wrestler	Nation	Start	Earned	Total
1	Bengt Johansson	Sweden	0	0	0
1	Maurice Mewis	Belgium	0	0	0
3	István Baranya	Hungary	0	1	1
3	Ignazio Fabra	Italy	0	1	1
3	Nikolay Solovyov	Soviet Union	0	1	1
3	Dick Wilson	United States	0	1	1
7	Dursun Ali Eğribaş	Turkey	0	3	3
7	Monty Hakansson	Australia	0	3	3
7	Dumitru Pîrvulescu	Romania	0	3	3
7	Borivoj Vukov	Yugoslavia	0	3	3
7	André Zoete	France	0	3	3

=== Round 2 ===
Bouts

Winner	Nation	Victory Type	Loser	Nation
Borivoj Vukov	Yugoslavia	Decision, 3–0	Bengt Johansson	Sweden
István Baranya	Hungary	Decision, 3–0	Maurice Mewis	Belgium
Dursun Ali Eğribaş	Turkey	Fall	Monty Hakansson	Australia
Ignazio Fabra	Italy	Decision, 3–0	Dick Wilson	United States
Nikolay Solovyov	Soviet Union	Fall	André Zoete	France
Dumitru Pîrvulescu	Romania	Bye	N/A	N/A

Points

Rank	Wrestler	Nation	Start	Earned	Total
1	Nikolay Solovyov	Soviet Union	1	0	1
2	István Baranya	Hungary	1	1	2
2	Ignazio Fabra	Italy	1	1	2
4	Dursun Ali Eğribaş	Turkey	3	0	3
4	Bengt Johansson	Sweden	0	3	3
4	Maurice Mewis	Belgium	0	3	3
4	Dumitru Pîrvulescu	Romania	3	0	3
8	Borivoj Vukov	Yugoslavia	3	1	4
8	Dick Wilson	United States	1	3	4
10	Monty Hakansson	Australia	3	3	6
10	André Zoete	France	3	3	6

=== Round 3 ===
Bouts

Winner	Nation	Victory Type	Loser	Nation
Dumitru Pîrvulescu	Romania	Decision, 3–0	Bengt Johansson	Sweden
Borivoj Vukov	Yugoslavia	Decision, 3–0	Maurice Mewis	Belgium
Ignazio Fabra	Italy	Decision, 3–0	István Baranya	Hungary
Dursun Ali Eğribaş	Turkey	Fall	Dick Wilson	United States
Nikolay Solovyov	Soviet Union	Bye	N/A	N/A

Points

Rank	Wrestler	Nation	Start	Earned	Total
1	Nikolay Solovyov	Soviet Union	1	0	1
2	Dursun Ali Eğribaş	Turkey	3	0	3
2	Ignazio Fabra	Italy	2	1	3
4	Dumitru Pîrvulescu	Romania	3	1	4
5	István Baranya	Hungary	2	3	5
6	Borivoj Vukov	Yugoslavia	4	1	5
7	Bengt Johansson	Sweden	3	3	6
7	Maurice Mewis	Belgium	3	3	6
9	Dick Wilson	United States	4	3	7

=== Round 4 ===
Bouts

Winner	Nation	Victory Type	Loser	Nation
Dursun Ali Eğribaş	Turkey	Decision, 3–0	Nikolay Solovyov	Soviet Union
Ignazio Fabra	Italy	Decision, 3–0	Dumitru Pîrvulescu	Romania

Points

Rank	Wrestler	Nation	Start	Earned	Total
1	Dursun Ali Eğribaş	Turkey	3	1	4
1	Ignazio Fabra	Italy	3	1	4
1	Nikolay Solovyov	Soviet Union	1	3	4
4	Dumitru Pîrvulescu	Romania	4	3	7

=== Medal rounds ===
Fabra's victory over Eğribaş in round 1 and Eğribaş's victory over Solovyov in round 4 counted for the medal round. Solovyov defeated Fabra in the medal round. Solovyov won gold due to his best score within the medal rounds (a win by fall and a loss for 3 points, compared to a win by decision and a loss for 4 points for each of the other two wrestlers). Between the two remaining wrestlers, Fabra had won head-to-head, so took silver. Eğribaş finished with bronze.

Bouts

Winner	Nation	Victory Type	Loser	Nation
Nikolay Solovyov	Soviet Union	Fall	Ignazio Fabra	Italy

Points

Rank	Wrestler	Nation	Wins	Losses	Points in round
1st place, gold medalist(s)	Nikolay Solovyov	Soviet Union	1	1	3
2nd place, silver medalist(s)	Ignazio Fabra	Italy	1	1	4
3rd place, bronze medalist(s)	Dursun Ali Eğribaş	Turkey	1	1	4
