= Wrestling at the 1952 Summer Olympics – Men's Greco-Roman flyweight =

Wrestling at the Olympics

Men's Greco-Roman flyweight at the Games of the XV Olympiad
- Venue: Messuhalli
- Dates: 24–27 July 1952
- Competitors: 17 from 17 nations

Medalists
1st place, gold medalist(s)		Boris Gurevich	Soviet Union
2nd place, silver medalist(s)		Ignazio Fabra	Italy
3rd place, bronze medalist(s)		Leo Honkala	Finland

The men's Greco-Roman flyweight competition at the 1952 Summer Olympics in Helsinki took place from 24 July to 27 July at Messuhalli. Nations were limited to one competitor. Flyweight was the lightest category, including wrestlers weighing up to 52 kilograms (114.6 lb).

== Competition format ==
This Greco-Roman wrestling competition continued to use the "bad points" elimination system introduced at the 1928 Summer Olympics for Greco-Roman and at the 1932 Summer Olympics for freestyle wrestling, removing the slight modification introduced in 1936 and used until 1948 (which had a reduced penalty for a loss by 2–1 decision). Each round featured all wrestlers pairing off and wrestling one bout (with one wrestler having a bye if there were an odd number). The loser received 3 points. The winner received 1 point if the win was by decision and 0 points if the win was by fall. At the end of each round, any wrestler with at least 5 points was eliminated. This elimination continued until the medal rounds, which began when 3 wrestlers remained. These 3 wrestlers each faced each other in a round-robin medal round (with earlier results counting, if any had wrestled another before); record within the medal round determined medals, with bad points breaking ties.

== Results ==
=== Round 1 ===
Bouts

Winner	Nation	Victory Type	Loser	Nation
Heini Weber	Germany	Fall	Werner Zimmer	Saar
Béla Kenéz	Hungary	Decision, 3–0	Fahrettin Akbaş	Turkey
Boris Gurevich	Soviet Union	Decision, 3–0	Borivoj Vukov	Yugoslavia
Svend Aage Thomsen	Denmark	Decision, 3–0	Josef Zeman	Czechoslovakia
Maurice Mewis	Belgium	Decision, 3–0	Dumitru Pîrvulescu	Romania
Bengt Johansson	Sweden	Decision, 3–0	Franz Brunner	Austria
Ignazio Fabra	Italy	Decision, 3–0	Edmond Faure	France
Mahmoud Omar Fawzy	Egypt	Fall	Frithjof Clausen	Norway
Leo Honkala	Finland	Bye	N/A	N/A

Points

Rank	Wrestler	Nation	Start	Earned	Total
1	Mahmoud Omar Fawzy	Egypt	0	0	0
1	Leo Honkala	Finland	0	0	0
1	Heini Weber	Germany	0	0	0
4	Ignazio Fabra	Italy	0	1	1
4	Boris Gurevich	Soviet Union	0	1	1
4	Bengt Johansson	Sweden	0	1	1
4	Béla Kenéz	Hungary	0	1	1
4	Maurice Mewis	Belgium	0	1	1
4	Svend Aage Thomsen	Denmark	0	1	1
10	Fahrettin Akbaş	Turkey	0	3	3
10	Franz Brunner	Austria	0	3	3
10	Frithjof Clausen	Norway	0	3	3
10	Edmond Faure	France	0	3	3
10	Dumitru Pîrvulescu	Romania	0	3	3
10	Borivoj Vukov	Yugoslavia	0	3	3
10	Josef Zeman	Czechoslovakia	0	3	3
10	Werner Zimmer	Saar	0	3	3

=== Round 2 ===
Clausen withdrew.

Bouts

Winner	Nation	Victory Type	Loser	Nation
Leo Honkala	Finland	Fall	Werner Zimmer	Saar
Heini Weber	Germany	Decision, 3–0	Fahrettin Akbaş	Turkey
Borivoj Vukov	Yugoslavia	Fall	Béla Kenéz	Hungary
Boris Gurevich	Soviet Union	Fall	Svend Aage Thomsen	Denmark
Maurice Mewis	Belgium	Fall	Josef Zeman	Czechoslovakia
Dumitru Pîrvulescu	Romania	Decision, 3–0	Franz Brunner	Austria
Bengt Johansson	Sweden	Decision, 3–0	Edmond Faure	France
Ignazio Fabra	Italy	Fall	Mahmoud Omar Fawzy	Egypt

Points

Rank	Wrestler	Nation	Start	Earned	Total
1	Leo Honkala	Finland	0	0	0
2	Ignazio Fabra	Italy	1	0	1
2	Boris Gurevich	Soviet Union	1	0	1
2	Maurice Mewis	Belgium	1	0	1
2	Heini Weber	Germany	0	1	1
6	Bengt Johansson	Sweden	1	1	2
7	Mahmoud Omar Fawzy	Egypt	0	3	3
7	Borivoj Vukov	Yugoslavia	3	0	3
9	Béla Kenéz	Hungary	1	3	4
9	Dumitru Pîrvulescu	Romania	3	1	4
9	Svend Aage Thomsen	Denmark	1	3	4
12	Frithjof Clausen	Norway	3	0	3*
13	Fahrettin Akbaş	Turkey	3	3	6
13	Franz Brunner	Austria	3	3	6
13	Edmond Faure	France	3	3	6
13	Josef Zeman	Czechoslovakia	3	3	6
13	Werner Zimmer	Saar	3	3	6

=== Round 3 ===
Bouts

Winner	Nation	Victory Type	Loser	Nation
Leo Honkala	Finland	Decision, 2–1	Heini Weber	Germany
Boris Gurevich	Soviet Union	Decision, 3–0	Béla Kenéz	Hungary
Borivoj Vukov	Yugoslavia	Decision, 3–0	Svend Aage Thomsen	Denmark
Bengt Johansson	Sweden	Decision, 3–0	Maurice Mewis	Belgium
Ignazio Fabra	Italy	Decision, 3–0	Dumitru Pîrvulescu	Romania
Mahmoud Omar Fawzy	Egypt	Bye	N/A	N/A

Points

Rank	Wrestler	Nation	Start	Earned	Total
1	Leo Honkala	Finland	0	1	1
2	Ignazio Fabra	Italy	1	1	2
2	Boris Gurevich	Soviet Union	1	1	2
4	Mahmoud Omar Fawzy	Egypt	3	0	3
4	Bengt Johansson	Sweden	2	1	3
6	Maurice Mewis	Belgium	1	3	4
6	Borivoj Vukov	Yugoslavia	3	1	4
6	Heini Weber	Germany	1	3	4
9	Béla Kenéz	Hungary	4	3	7
9	Dumitru Pîrvulescu	Romania	4	3	7
9	Svend Aage Thomsen	Denmark	4	3	7

=== Round 4 ===
Bouts

Winner	Nation	Victory Type	Loser	Nation
Leo Honkala	Finland	Decision, 3–0	Mahmoud Omar Fawzy	Egypt
Heini Weber	Germany	Decision, 3–0	Borivoj Vukov	Yugoslavia
Boris Gurevich	Soviet Union	Decision, 3–0	Maurice Mewis	Belgium
Ignazio Fabra	Italy	Decision, 3–0	Bengt Johansson	Sweden

Points

Rank	Wrestler	Nation	Start	Earned	Total
1	Leo Honkala	Finland	1	1	2
2	Ignazio Fabra	Italy	2	1	3
2	Boris Gurevich	Soviet Union	2	1	3
4	Heini Weber	Germany	4	1	5
5	Mahmoud Omar Fawzy	Egypt	3	3	6
5	Bengt Johansson	Sweden	3	3	6
7	Maurice Mewis	Belgium	4	3	7
7	Borivoj Vukov	Yugoslavia	4	3	7

=== Medal rounds ===
Bouts

Winner	Nation	Victory Type	Loser	Nation
Boris Gurevich	Soviet Union	Decision, 3–0	Leo Honkala	Finland
Ignazio Fabra	Italy	Decision, 3–0	Leo Honkala	Finland
Boris Gurevich	Soviet Union	Decision, 3–0	Ignazio Fabra	Italy

Points

Rank	Wrestler	Nation	Wins	Losses	Start	Earned	Total
1st place, gold medalist(s)	Boris Gurevich	Soviet Union	2	0	3	2	5
2nd place, silver medalist(s)	Ignazio Fabra	Italy	1	1	3	4	7
3rd place, bronze medalist(s)	Leo Honkala	Finland	0	2	2	6	8
