= Ignazio Fabra =

Italian wrestler (1930–2008)

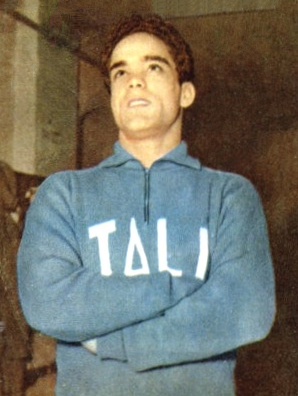

Personal information
- Born: 25 April 1930 Palermo, Italy
- Died: 13 April 2008 (aged 77) Genoa, Italy
- Height: 161 cm (5 ft 3 in)
- Weight: 51 kg (112 lb)

Sport
- Sport: Greco-Roman wrestling
- Club: Società Sportiva Calvaruso Palermo; GS Italsider Genova
Medal record
Representing Italy
Olympic Games
Silver medal – second place	1952 Helsinki	52 kg
Silver medal – second place	1956 Melbourne	52 kg
World Championships
Gold medal – first place	1955 Karlsruhe	52 kg
Silver medal – second place	1962 Toledo	52 kg
Silver medal – second place	1963 Helsingborg	52 kg
Mediterranean Games
Gold medal – first place	1951 Alexandia	52 kg
Silver medal – second place	1963 Naples	52 kg

Ignazio Fabra (25 April 1930 – 13 April 2008) is a flyweight Greco-Roman wrestler from Italy. He won a world title in 1955 and finished second at the 1952 and 1956 Olympics and 1962 and 1963 world championships. He placed fifth at the 1960 Olympics and fourth at the 1964 Olympics.

Fabra was deaf since birth and communicated by signs. He was winning the 1952 Olympic final against Boris Gurevich, but then misinterpreted a gesture of his coach, went into an attack, and got caught up in a counter-attack. After winning the 1955 world title he was a heavy favorite at the 1956 games, but lost in the final to Nikolay Solovyov due to a knee injury. Fabra retired in the late 1960s and became a wrestling coach. He led the national wrestling team at the 1969 World Games of the Deaf and prepared the 1972 Olympic medalist Giuseppe Bognanni.

Fabra was the first person to participate both at Olympic Games and Deaflympics. He has also won gold medals in 1961 and 1965 Deaflympics.
