= Boris Gurevich =

Boris Gurevich may refer to:

- Boris Gurevich (wrestler, born 1931), Soviet Olympic wrestler
- Boris Gurevich (wrestler, born 1937), Soviet Olympic wrestler
- Boris Gurevich (mathematician, born 1938), Russian mathematician
