= Nikolai Getman =

Russian painter

- Микола Іванович Гетьман
- Born: 1917; Kharkiv, Ukraine
- Died: August 2004 (aged 86–87); Orel, Russia
- Occupation: Artist

Mykola Ivanovich Hetman (Ukrainian: Микола Іванович Гетьман, 1917 - August 2004) was a Ukrainian artist. He was a prisoner from 1946 to 1953 in forced labor camps in Siberia and Kolyma, where he survived as a result of his ability to sketch for the propaganda requirements of the authorities. He is remembered as one of few artists who has recorded the life of prisoners in the Gulag in the form of paintings.

== Early life ==
Getman had a difficult childhood in Ukraine, often close to starvation, but from the very beginning was able to develop his natural artistic talents. After graduating from technical college in 1937, he attended the Kharkiv Art College in order to become a professional artist. Three years later he was called up to join the Red Army, where he served until the end of World War II. Shortly after his return, he was arrested for participating in anti-Soviet propaganda as a result of a caricature of Stalin one of his friends had drawn on a cigarette box. He was convicted in January 1946 and sent to the Gulag prison camps in Siberia.

== Time in Gulag ==
During the eight years Getman spent at Taishetlag (Siberia) and Svitlag (Kolyma), he started to develop his plan to record the horrors of the camp conditions in the form of paintings. While he could not paint openly in the camps, he took careful note of all that transpired. Even when he started to paint after his release in 1953, he still had to do so in secret as he would otherwise have been convicted once again, perhaps even sentenced to death. In his own words: "I undertook the task because I was convinced that it was my duty to leave behind a testimony to the fate of the millions of prisoners who died."

The Victims of Communism Museum provides access to all 50 of Getman's paintings together with explanations of their significance. Their impact is especially effective in providing visual representations of the conduct of the camps, the harsh working conditions, the severe climate and the fate of the prisoners themselves.

The Gulag paintings were not shown until 1993 at a private exhibition in the gallery of the Russian Artists' Union in Orel. In 1995, there was a special ceremony in the Turgenev Theatre in Orel where a Getman exhibition entitled "The Gulag in the Eyes of an Artist" was opened in the presence of the artist and Aleksandr Solzhenitsyn, author of The Gulag Archipelago.

In June 1997, the private exhibition "The Gulag in the Eyes of an Artist" was displayed at the U.S. Congress in Washington, D.C.

== Other artistic activities ==
In 1953, after his release, Getman worked as an artist in the House of Culture in Yagodnoe in Magadan Oblast. In 1956, he took part in an exhibition of the works of artists from Siberia and the Kolyma region and became a candidate for the USSR Union of Artists in 1957. In April 1963, he took part in the Second Congress of the USSR Artists' Union in Moscow, and in 1964 became a member of the USSR Artists' Union. He helped organize the Magadan Artists' Union and became director of the Magadan section of the Arts Foundation of the RSFSR from 1963 to 1966. In 1976, he moved from Magadan to Orel, where he had a studio in the local branch of the Russian Artists' Union. During this period he was also required to paint a number of portraits of political figures.

He participated in several art exhibitions across the Soviet Union as well as in Germany, Bulgaria, Finland and The Netherlands.

== Purpose of his art ==
Getman was clear about his goal: "Some may say that the Gulag is a forgotten part of history and that we do not need to be reminded. But I have witnessed monstrous crimes. It is not too late to talk about them and reveal them. It is essential to do so. Some have expressed fear on seeing some of my paintings that I might end up in Kolyma again—this time for good. But the people must be reminded...of one of the harshest acts of political repression in the Soviet Union. My paintings may help achieve this."

A book with his paintings was published by the Jamestown Foundation in 2001.

== Bibliography ==
- Getman, Nikolai: The Gulag Collection: Paintings of the Soviet Penal System, The Jamestown Foundation, 2001, 131 p., ISBN 0-9675009-1-5

== See also ==
- Eufrosinia Kersnovskaya
