= Takashi Hirata =

Japanese wrestler

Personal information
- Nationality: Japanese
- Born: 15 January 1936 (age 90) Tokyo, Japan

Sport
- Sport: Wrestling

Takashi Hirata (born 15 January 1936) is a Japanese wrestler. He competed in the men's Greco-Roman flyweight at the 1960 Summer Olympics.
