= Leo Honkala =

Finnish wrestler (1933–2015)

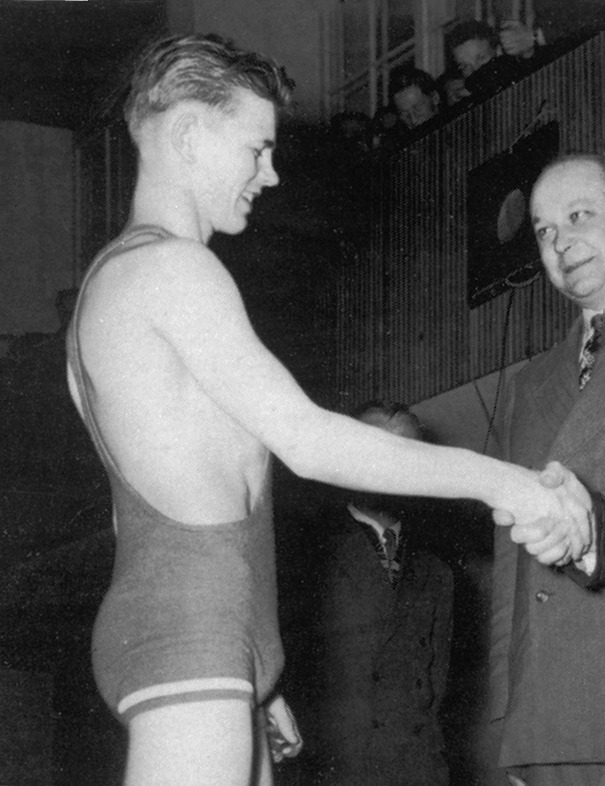

Personal information
- Born: 8 January 1933 Oulu, Finland
- Died: 17 May 2015 (aged 82) Oxelösund, Sweden
- Height: 170 cm (5 ft 7 in)
- Weight: 57–62 kg (126–137 lb)

Sport
- Sport: Greco-Roman wrestling
- Club: Oulun Pyrintö
Medal record
Representing Finland
Olympic Games
Bronze medal – third place	1952 Helsinki	Flyweight

Leo Ilmo Honkala (8 January 1933 – 17 May 2015) was a flyweight Greco-Roman wrestler from Finland who won a bronze medal at the 1952 Summer Olympics. In the following several years he suffered several shoulder injuries, and retired from competitions in 1956 after winning his only national title. In retirement he first worked as a policeman in Finland, but in the late 1960s immigrated to Sweden, and in 1974–85 trained the Swedish wrestling team. He also competed in powerlifting, but at the 2006 European Masters Championships failed a drug test for EPO and was banned for life.
