= Osman El-Sayed =

Egyptian Greco-Roman wrestler

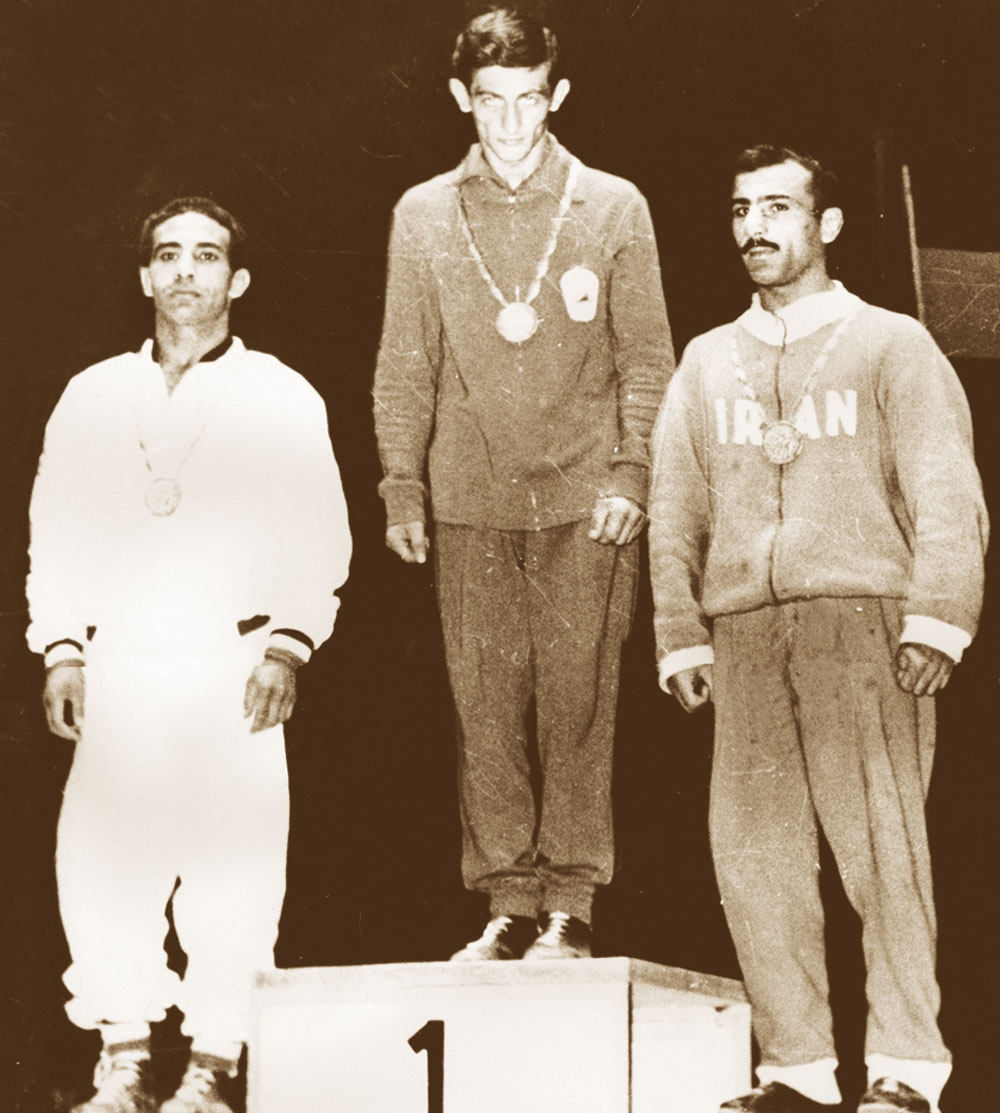
- El-Sayed (left) at the 1960 Olympics

Personal information
- Born: 28 February 1930 Alexandria, Egypt
- Died: 21 April 2013 (aged 83)

Sport
- Sport: Greco-Roman wrestling
Medal record
Representing United Arab Republic
Olympic Games
Silver medal – second place	1960 Rome	52 kg

Muhammad Osman El-Sayed (Arabic: محمد عثمان السيد; 28 February 1930 – 21 April 2013) was a flyweight Greco-Roman wrestler from Egypt who won a silver medal at the 1960 Olympics.
