= Dursun Ali Eğribaş =

Turkish wrestler (1933–2014)

Medal record

Representing Turkey

Men's Greco-Roman wrestling

Olympic Games
Bronze medal – third place	1956 Melbourne	52 kg

Mediterranean Games
Gold medal – first place	1959 Beirut	52 kg

Dursun Ali Eğribaş (1933 – August 2014) was a Turkish wrestler. He won a bronze medal in flyweight at the 1956 Summer Olympics in Melbourne.
