= Werner Zimmer =

German wrestler (1929–2019)

Personal information
- Nationality: German
- Born: 27 November 1929 Etzenhofen, Germany
- Died: 29 April 2019 (aged 89)

Sport
- Sport: Wrestling

Werner Zimmer (27 November 1929 – 29 April 2019) was a German wrestler. He competed in the men's Greco-Roman flyweight at the 1952 Summer Olympics, representing Saar.
