= Mahmoud Omar Fawzy =

Egyptian wrestler (born 1919)

Personal information
- Nationality: Egyptian
- Born: 10 October 1919 Cairo, Egypt

Sport
- Sport: Wrestling

Mahmoud Omar Fawzy (born 10 October 1919, date of death unknown) was an Egyptian wrestler. He competed in the men's Greco-Roman flyweight at the 1952 Summer Olympics. Fawzy is deceased.
