= Monty Hakansson =

Swedish wrestler (1919–1992)

Personal information
- Full name: Malte Sigvard Håkansson
- Nationality: Swedish
- Born: 28 October 1919 Kävlinge, Sweden
- Died: 15 February 1992 (aged 72)

Sport
- Sport: Wrestling

Monty Hakansson (28 October 1919 – 15 February 1992) was a Swedish wrestler. He moved to Australia in 1948, becoming an Australian citizen. He competed in the men's Greco-Roman flyweight at the 1956 Summer Olympics, representing Australia.
