= István Baranya =

Hungarian wrestler

Personal information
- Nationality: Hungarian
- Born: 9 February 1931 Hódmezővásárhely, Hungary
- Died: 24 June 2007 (aged 76) Budapest, Hungary

Sport
- Sport: Wrestling

István Baranya (9 February 1931 – 24 June 2007) was a Hungarian wrestler. He competed in the men's Greco-Roman flyweight at the 1956 Summer Olympics.
