= Stefan Hajduk =

Polish wrestler

Personal information
- Nationality: Polish
- Born: 2 November 1933 Eustachów, Poland
- Died: 28 April 1993 (aged 59) Warsaw, Poland

Sport
- Sport: Wrestling

Stefan Hajduk (2 November 1933 – 28 April 1993) was a Polish wrestler. He competed in the men's Greco-Roman flyweight at the 1960 Summer Olympics.
