= Josef Zeman (wrestler) =

Czech wrestler

Personal information
- Nationality: Czech
- Born: 24 December 1925
- Died: 16 June 2003 (aged 77)

Sport
- Sport: Wrestling

Josef Zeman (24 December 1925 – 16 June 2003) was a Czech wrestler. He competed in the men's Greco-Roman flyweight at the 1952 Summer Olympics.
