= Franz Burkhard =

Swiss wrestler

Personal information
- Nationality: Swiss
- Born: 25 May 1931 Sempach, Switzerland

Sport
- Sport: Wrestling

Franz Burkhard (born 25 May 1931) is a Swiss former wrestler. He competed in the men's Greco-Roman flyweight at the 1960 Summer Olympics.
