= Heikki Hakola =

Finnish wrestler

Personal information
- Nationality: Finnish
- Born: 11 December 1929 Lapua, Finland
- Died: 29 March 2016 (aged 86) Lapua, Finland

Sport
- Sport: Wrestling

Heikki Hakola (11 December 1929 – 29 March 2016) was a Finnish wrestler. He competed in the men's Greco-Roman flyweight at the 1960 Summer Olympics.
