= Mohammad Paziraei =

Iranian Greco-Roman wrestler (1929–2002)

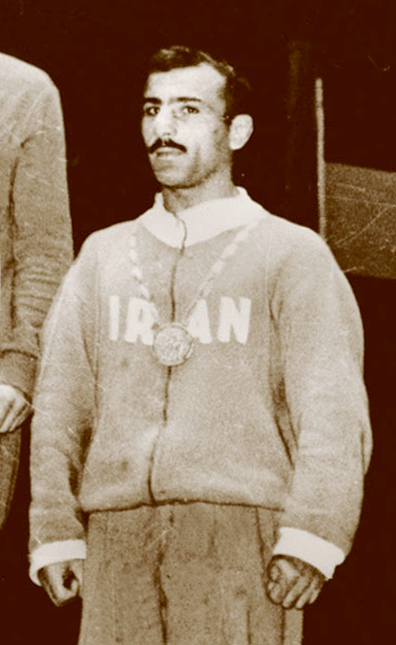
- Paziraei at the 1960 Olympics in Rome

Personal information
- Born: 4 August 1929 Baku, Azerbaijan
- Died: 9 March 2002 (aged 72) Tehran, Iran
- Height: 162 cm (5 ft 4 in)

Sport
- Sport: Greco-Roman wrestling
Medal record
Representing Iran
Olympic Games
Bronze medal – third place	1960 Rome	52 kg

Mohammad Paziraei (Persian: محمد پذیرایی, 4 August 1929 – 9 March 2002) was a Greco-Roman flyweight wrestler, who was born to an Iranian family living in Azerbaijan, but spent most of his life in Iran. He won a bronze medal at the 1960 Olympics and placed fifth at the 1961 and placed sixth at the 1962 World Championships.
