= Heini Weber =

German wrestler

Personal information
- Nationality: German
- Born: 2 November 1923; Neumarkt in der Oberpfalz, Germany
- Died: 27 April 2010 (aged 86)

Sport
- Sport: Wrestling

Heini Weber (2 November 1923 – 27 April 2010) was a German wrestler. He competed in two events at the 1952 Summer Olympics.
