= Eufrosinia Kersnovskaya =

Russian painter

Eufrosinia Antonovna Kersnovskaya
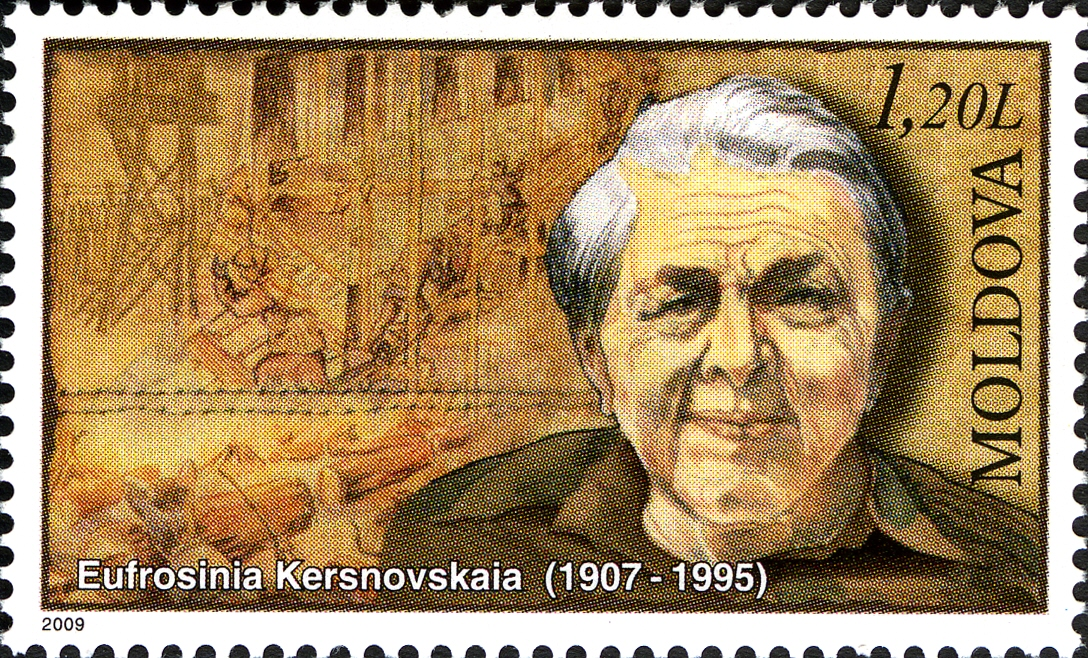
- Born: 8 January 1908; Odesa, Russian Empire (modern Ukraine)
- Died: 8 March 1994 (aged 86); Yessentuki, Stavropol Krai, Russia
- Parent(s): Anton Antonovich Kersnovski-sr. (died in 1936-1939) and Alexandra Alekseevna Kersnovskaya (née Karavasili) (1878 – 17 january 1964)
- Relatives: Anton Antonovich Kersnovski (brother) (1905 – 24 June 1944)
- Website: http://www.gulag.su

Eufrosinia Antonovna Kersnovskaya (Russian: Евфроси́ния Анто́новна Керсно́вская; Romanian: Eufrosinia Kersnovskaia; 8 January 1908 – 8 March 1994) was a Russian woman who spent 12 years in Gulag camps and wrote her memoirs in 12 notebooks, 2,200,000 characters, accompanied with 680 pictures.

She wrote three copies of the work. In 1968, friends typed samizdat copies, repeating the pictures on the back sides of the sheets. Excerpts from the work were first published in Ogonyok and Znamya magazines in 1990, as well as in The Observer (June 1990). After that, German and French publications followed. In 2001 the complete text, in six volumes, was published in Russia.

== Biography ==
Eufrosinia Kersnovskaya was born in Odessa to a family of Russian gentry. During the Russian Civil War the family moved to their estate in Bessarabia to become farmers. Bessarabia was soon united with Romania.

In 1940, Bessarabia was occupied and annexed by the Soviet Union, and the Kersnovskaya family (Eufrosinia and her mother) were oppressed as former landowners. In June 1941 she was deported to Siberia as an exile settler (ссыльнопоселенец) to work as a logger.

In 1942 she attempted to escape, but was recaptured and sentenced to death. She refused to ask for clemency and wrote on a sheet of paper provided to her for this purpose: "I cannot demand justice, I do not want to ask for mercy". Kernovskaya's death sentence was nevertheless commuted to 10 years of labor camps, which she spent in the Norillag (Норильлаг, Norilsk labor camp) at mining works.

After the discharge in 1953 she lived in Yessentuki and wrote her memoirs during 1964–1968, which were published only in 1990.

Her memoirs are illustrated by hundreds of drawings of life in the Gulag. They are also remarkable for the quality of the drawings.

== Bibliography ==
- Керсновская Е.А. "Наскальная живопись". - М.: КВАДРАТ, 1991;
- Kersnovskaja Е. "Ach Herr wenn unsre Sünden uns verklagen". - Kiel: NEUER MALIK VERLAG, 1991.
- Kersnovskaja Е. "Coupable de rien". - Paris: PLON, 1994.
- Керсновская Е.А. "Сколько стоит человек". - 6 volumes, Moscow, ООО "МОЖАЙСК-ТЕРРА", 2000-2001.

== See also ==
- Nikolai Getman
- David Olère
- Vann Nath
- Vedem
