= Percy Purcell =

Australian rules footballer, born 1911

Personal information
- Full name: Pearce Gerard Purcell
- Born: 18 May 1911; Maryborough, Victoria
- Died: 13 May 1994 (aged 82)
- Height: 173 cm (5 ft 8 in)
- Weight: 64 kg (141 lb)

Playing career^{1}
Years	Club	Games (Goals)
1935	North Melbourne	3 (1)
- ^{1} Playing statistics correct to the end of 1935.

Percy Purcell (18 May 1911 – 13 May 1994) was an Australian rules footballer who played with North Melbourne in the Victorian Football League (VFL).

Purcell later served in the Royal Australian Air Force during World War II.
