= Pat Phillips =

Australian rules footballer

Personal information
- Full name: Patrick Gerald Phillips
- Born: 9 June 1927; Preston, Victoria
- Died: 29 May 1994 (aged 66)
- Original team: Chelsea
- Height: 178 cm (5 ft 10 in)
- Weight: 73 kg (161 lb)

Playing career^{1}
Years	Club	Games (Goals)
1947–48	Richmond	15 (3)
- ^{1} Playing statistics correct to the end of 1948.

Patrick Gerald Phillips (9 June 1927 – 29 May 1994) was an Australian rules footballer who played with Richmond in the Victorian Football League (VFL).
