= Lindsay Tipping =

Australian rules footballer

Personal information
- Full name: Lindsay Tipping
- Born: 11 April 1950
- Died: 7 March 1994 (aged 43)
- Original team: Camberwell Baptists
- Height: 183 cm (6 ft 0 in)
- Weight: 81 kg (179 lb)

Playing career^{1}
| Years | Club | Games (Goals) |
| 1969–71 | Hawthorn | 12 (0) |
- ^{1} Playing statistics correct to the end of 1971.

Lindsay Tipping (11 April 1950 – 7 March 1994) was an Australian rules footballer who played with Hawthorn in the Victorian Football League (VFL).
