= Jørgen Jensen (wrestler) =

Danish wrestler (1939–1995)

Personal information
- Nationality: Danish
- Born: 2 June 1939; Copenhagen, Denmark
- Died: 12 March 1995 (aged 55); Copenhagen, Denmark

Sport
- Sport: Wrestling

Jørgen Jensen (2 June 1939 – 12 March 1995) was a Danish wrestler. He competed at the 1960 Summer Olympics and the 1964 Summer Olympics.
