= Frank Beck (sex offender) =

English child sex offender (1942–1994)

- Born: 19 July 1942; Salisbury, Wiltshire, England
- Died: 31 May 1994 (aged 51); Whitemoor Prison, Cambridgeshire, England
- Occupation: Officer-in-charge of several children's homes
- Known for: Convicted child sex offender
- Criminal charges: Sexual and physical assaults
- Penalty: Five life-terms

Frank Beck (19 July 1942 – 31 May 1994) was an English convicted child sex offender. He was employed by the Leicestershire County Council as the officer-in-charge of several children's homes in Leicestershire, between 1973 and 1986. Though holding only a 'middle management' grade within the hierarchy of Leicestershire Social Services, Beck quickly established an esteemed reputation among his professional peers as an innovative, dynamic and extraordinarily effective practitioner in dealing with the emotional and behavioural complexities of troubled young people placed in his charge. Beck was later at the centre of Britain's biggest investigation into institutional child abuse, between 1989 and 1991.

== Background and route into social work ==
Born in Salisbury, Beck was raised in Thornton Heath, Croydon, the son of a train driver and the youngest of five children. Leaving secondary modern school without any qualifications, Beck trained to be a pig keeper and spent three years working on a farm before joining the Royal Marines.

Beck spent ten years as a marine, serving in Borneo and Aden and attaining the rank of sergeant. Emerging with an honourable discharge and campaign medals in June 1969, Beck apparently turned down officer training and chose instead to train as a social worker.

Beck subsequently obtained employment with Northampton Social Services and went into a training course at the Stevenage College of Further Education, where he acquired a Certificate of Qualification in Social Work (CQSW) and a Home Office Letter of Recognition in Child Care. Beck then gained employment with Leicestershire Social Services in August 1973. He started work on 1 September and served as officer-in-charge of three local authority children's homes until his resignation in March 1986. The children's homes concerned were The Poplars Children's Home, Market Harborough (1973–75); Ratcliffe Road Children's Home, Leicester (1975–78) and The Beeches Children's Home, Leicester Forest East (1978–1986).

== Character and attributes ==
An ex-Royal Marine sergeant, he was described as "tough, uncompromising and very, very strong", with arms "... as thick as the thighs of the children in his care".

In addition to his physical strength and fitness, Beck also seems to have exuded extraordinary charisma and despite a limited educational background he possessed a sharp intellect, eloquence and critical ability which, combined with the outstanding success he seemed to have in bringing the most wayward and behaviourally challenging children to order led to positive comments from his superiors. Dorothy Edwards, the Director of Social Services (1973–80) reportedly told a friend, "I don't know quite what he's doing, but he's doing it very well."

Beck was also a local politician, being elected in 1983 as a Liberal Party councillor to a seat on the Blaby District Council, which he successfully defended in 1987.

== System of abuse ==
Beck is said to have used his own brand of 'regression therapy' as a cover for sexually abusing children in his care – supposedly a method of digging down to the roots of children's emotional problems, by returning them to a state of infancy. Children were dressed in pyjamas and given bottles and dummies; some of the younger children were dressed in nappies. At meal times, staff would sometimes cut up the food on the plates of residents, as if feeding infants; children would be given toys designed for much younger children and sometimes bathed by staff members and Beck encouraged a culture of cuddling and bodily contact.

Beck also believed that emotions should not be 'bottled up' and it is said that children were deliberately provoked into temper tantrums, thereby creating opportunities to exercise violent physical restraint. Residential Social Workers were often hand-picked by Beck and were required to support his methods and philosophy without question. Several of his staff were also paedophiles and sadists, including Colin Fiddaman, who in 1991 killed himself in Amsterdam while on the run. Beck is also said to have physically and sexually abused male members of staff, sustaining 'a regime of terror' for thirteen years.

== Allegations, investigation and arrest ==
During the early 1980s, the number of complaints made about Beck's deployment of sexual and physical abuse and the unconventional methods he used as a child-care practitioner began to escalate. Complaints and concerns were aired not just by the young people in his 'care', but also by other members of staff and visiting professional agencies. In 1983, Beck was charged with actual bodily harm against a 10-year-old boy who had been severely bruised across the buttocks after Beck had 'spanked' him. The boy had stayed at The Beeches Children's Home in Leicester for weekend respite care and Beck was subsequently arrested after the child's mother reported matters to the police. Beck was duly acquitted at the ensuing trial and benefited from adulatory testimonials of support elicited from other members of staff; such was the belief in Beck's professional integrity among senior managers of Leicestershire Social Services that it was not even deemed necessary to suspend him from duty, pending the outcome of the allegation.

Beck's seemingly 'bomb-proof' invincibility saw him fend off a continued escalation of complaints, until finally, in March 1986, his career in Leicestershire was ended by a complaint of sexual abuse made by two male residential social workers at The Beeches, who claimed that Beck had made advances toward them during staff supervision sessions. This time, Beck was suspended from duty and he subsequently handed in his resignation rather than subject himself to investigations under the council's protracted disciplinary procedures and risk dismissal.

Beck's resignation letter implicitly admitted the truth of the complaints (while at the same time calling them 'overstated'). "I cannot say how sorry I am", he wrote.

Following temporary menial employment as a security guard, Beck later attempted to resurrect his social work career with 'Reliance Social Care', an agency supplying staff to social services departments in London. A reference was supplied to them by Brian Rice, the Director of Leicestershire Social Services who had replaced Dorothy Edwards in 1980 and which gave a positive appraisal of Beck's abilities in working with young people, with only a suggestion that the agency might wish to discuss with him the exact reasons for his resignation. The same reference enabled him to gain a post at the Woodcock Hill Children's Home in Brent and he later moved on to Hertfordshire, where he was accused of sexual relationships with two clients, one an adolescent boy.

The complaint that finally led to Beck's last arrest came from a young mother who had formerly been in Beck's care at the Ratcliffe Road Children's Home. In 1989, she made disclosures of historical abuse suffered under the Beck regime, whilst attending parent-craft meetings run by her social worker at the Regent Street Nursery in Loughborough, Leicestershire. The social worker took these allegations to the police and helped pave the way for Britain's largest investigation into institutionalised child abuse. It led to police taking statements from nearly four hundred children in an operation which lasted for two and a half years, conducted by more than thirty police officers. Under the direction of the Leicestershire Constabulary, various other police authorities traced and interviewed former children in care across four continents.

At approximately 7.35 am on 14 April 1990, police officers executed a warrant of arrest at Beck's home in Braunstone, Leicester and informed him that he was being arrested after an investigation into sexual misconduct in Leicestershire children's homes during the 1970s and 1980s. Beck is said to have replied, "Oh Jesus ... No!", and spent the next eighteen months on remand.

== Trial and conviction ==
On 29 November 1991, following an eleven-week trial at the Leicester Crown Court, Beck was sentenced to five life-terms for sexual and physical assaults against more than one hundred children in his care. He was sentenced to a further twenty-four years on seventeen charges of abuse, including rape. The term of five life-sentences remains as one of the most severe in British legal history since the ending of the death penalty for murder.

The case led to the Kirkwood Inquiry, chaired by Andrew Kirkwood QC. Sittings were held in secret to protect innocent third parties, but not all evidence was released to the public. The inquiry reported in 1993 and was strongly critical of the management of Leicestershire Social Services during the 1970s and 1980s and of the conduct of several key managers.

== Alleged murder of Simon O'Donnell ==
In their book, Abuse of Trust, Mark D'Arcy and Paul Gosling suggest that in 1977, Beck and a co-worker, Colin Fiddaman, killed a 12-year-old boy, Simon O'Donnell, by throttling him whilst he was being sexually abused, though the subsequent inquest into O'Donnell's death concluded that the boy had committed suicide after running away from a children's home run by Beck. The authors state that other children living in the home at that time have since given evidence to say that the injuries allegedly caused to O'Donnell were consistent with the system of physical restraint used by Beck and Fiddaman, which entailed wrapping a towel around the neck of a child during the course of abuse.

In 1998, a former resident, Peter Bastin, stated that he witnessed Beck and Fiddaman removing what he believed to be O'Donnell's body from the home on the night before the child was found dead in a local factory.

In the same year, Bastin was awarded a rumoured £50,000 compensation for the abuse and suffering he received from Beck, which, he claimed, helped turn him into a child abuser, Bastin himself having been convicted in 1979 of raping and murdering a 10-year-old boy. Bastin was apparently one of four Beck victims who went on to become murderers, "lending credence to experts who believe that victims of child abuse are more likely to become abusers themselves".

The claim of D'Arcy and Gosling, that "there is strong evidence" that Beck was a murderer, received harsh criticism from the investigative historian Richard Webster, who points out that Bastin gave his evidence twenty-one years after the death of O'Donnell, during the course of a compensation hearing from which he stood to derive financial gain. Bastin also claimed that he murdered a 10-year-old victim using throttling techniques he had copied from Beck.

== Intended appeal and post-trial support ==
Throughout the trial and up until his death, Beck emphatically protested his innocence as a victim of mass conspiracy and sought to launch an appeal to secure his release and clear his name. Beck spent much of his time in Whitemoor prison vigorously planning his appeal and such eminent barristers as Anthony Scrivener and Michael Manning are said to have shown an interest in taking his case.

One of his most high-profile supporters was the Labour peer, Lord Longford, who campaigned for the release of 'Moors murderer' Myra Hindley. "Personally I am convinced that not only did Frank Beck act throughout as an idealist, but that he did not exceed the bounds of propriety and certainly did not commit any criminal act," wrote Longford in his autobiography, Avowed Intent. "Those that spoke against him were usually, it would seem, likely to gain financially if he were convicted." However, Longford seems to have based this belief, not as a result of having seen any evidence, but as a result of his befriending of Beck as a prison visitor.

Longford was not alone in his belief that Beck was innocent and it is evident that for many, Beck's charisma, charm and power of persuasion were undiminished, despite the crushing intensity of his circumstances.

Beck's solicitor, Oliver D'Sa, had also come to fully believe in his innocence and acted not merely as a paid lawyer "just doing his job", but as someone absolutely committed to his case. Following Beck's conviction, D'Sa continued to argue his innocence and affirm his belief that there had been a monumental miscarriage of justice, even writing to the local evening newspaper, The Leicester Mercury, complaining about the way it had covered the trial and pleading for a more enlightened attitude, one that recognised that Beck might, after all, be not guilty. "The catalogue of miscarriages of justice evident in the cases of 'the Guildford Four', 'the Birmingham Six', 'the Maguire Seven' and 'the Tottenham Three' have shown the fallibility of the system of criminal justice," wrote D'Sa. He continued, "... I have received during the course of the case many testimonials and references from children who have been in the care of Mr Beck and fellow social workers, who testify to the help, kindness and devotion to his work."

Though D'Sa was convinced of Beck's innocence at the time he represented him and immediately afterward, he has since revised his stance and later said: "I don't know where the truth lies. It is one of those cases that has been a conundrum to me. I think Frank Beck was a mesmeric character and very intelligent. Since then I have represented a number of his victims in the local magistrates' courts. The victims have given their accounts with such clarity that I think it unlikely that all those complainants could have lied. The spread of victims, in terms of timescale and geography, makes it impossible to have collaboration on that scale. I think Frank Beck believed in his own lies – he believed that he was innocent."

== Death and conspiracy theories ==
Beck died, aged 51, on the evening of 31 May 1994, two and a half years after his imprisonment, apparently as a result of a heart attack whilst playing badminton at Whitemoor Prison in Cambridgeshire. His body was cremated on 9 June 1994, at a private ceremony at the Gilroes Crematorium in Leicester, attended by a small number of family members. The then 88-year-old Labour peer, Lord Longford, caused great controversy by sending flowers to the funeral.

Unsurprisingly, his sudden death after such a relatively short period of incarceration led to speculation that he had been murdered. D'Arcy and Gosling, in their book, Abuse of Trust, claim that fellow prisoners (some of whom had allegedly been his victims) attributed his death to amphetamine, which had supposedly been surreptitiously added to his food over a period of months.

== Victim compensation claims ==
More than 100 of Beck's victims claimed compensation from Leicestershire County Council in 1995. Two victims were awarded £225,000 in damages in 1996.

== Study by D'Arcy and Gosling, 1998 ==
Abuse of Trust: Frank Beck and the Leicestershire Children's Homes Scandal, published by Bowerdean and Co., London in 1998, is a paperback work of two hundred and twenty four pages written by journalists, Mark D'Arcy and Paul Gosling and remains the definitive, semi-biographical account of the Frank Beck story.

The front cover of this publication depicts the image of Beck, appearing gaunt and emaciated, as captured by a newspaper photographer during his police conveyance from a trial appearance at Leicester Crown Court. It bears little resemblance to the photograph of Beck within the book, which shows him as a burly and confident much younger man, depicted outside the Beeches Children's Home at Leicester Forest East during the 1980s.

== Richard Webster: criticism of D'Arcy and Gosling ==
Abuse of Trust was heavily criticised by Richard Webster, a writer who suggested that hysteria lay behind some abuse scandals, particularly in the case of Beck.

Webster did not seek to advocate the innocence of Beck, nor his guilt, but was strongly critical of what he perceived as the inherent bias of D'Arcy and Gosling in setting out to create a work that was fervently determined from the outset to portray him as "a proven monster" and disregarding any evidence to suggest that prosecution evidence against him may have been tainted.

Webster wrote: "Beck always maintained that he had never sexually abused anyone in his care. Far more importantly, he had convinced two key members of his legal team of his innocence. One of these was Ian Henning, a gifted legal executive (and former policeman) who had taken charge of Beck's defence. The other was Bernard Greaves, the former policy adviser to the Liberal Party. When Greaves first met Beck, he did not believe his denials. But wherever documentary evidence was available, he found it confirmed what Beck had said – that he could not have committed the offences in question. The more they worked on the case, the more Henning and Greaves became convinced that Beck had become the victim of an unprecedented trawling operation in which police officers, in their anxiety to gain a conviction, had inadvertently suggested allegations to the witness they were interviewing. Largely as a result of the work done by his defence team, Beck was acquitted on half the charges he faced. Henning and Greaves were preparing his appeal when Beck died of a heart attack in prison."

Webster continued: "To say this is not to endorse the view that Beck was completely innocent. Now that both Beck and Henning are dead, it will probably never be possible to establish the true facts about the case. But there is a great deal of evidence to suggest that the kind of police investigation mounted into Frank Beck was intrinsically unsafe. The alarming thing is the way in which this evidence has been conjured into virtual invisibility by D'Arcy and Gosling".

Webster was also highly critical of the suggestion by D'Arcy and Gosling that Beck had murdered Simon O'Donnell, an adolescent boy formerly in his care. Webster pointed out that the only evidence D'Arcy and Gosling have for making this claim was that produced by Peter Bastin, himself a convicted rapist and murderer. Webster points out that Bastin's evidence was produced during a lucrative compensation hearing. "Twenty-one years after a verdict of suicide was returned on a thirteen-year-old boy who had been in Beck's care, this man claimed that he had looked out of the window on the night in question and seen Beck and Fiddaman carrying 'something wrapped in a blanket', which he now, in 1998, believes was the body of the boy," wrote Webster. "Although it bears many of the marks of being an opportunistic fabrication, D'Arcy and Gosling treat it with respect.... The handling of Bastin's story should in itself be sufficient to undermine the reader's faith in the authors' judgment."
