= Olga Spiridonović =

Serbian actress

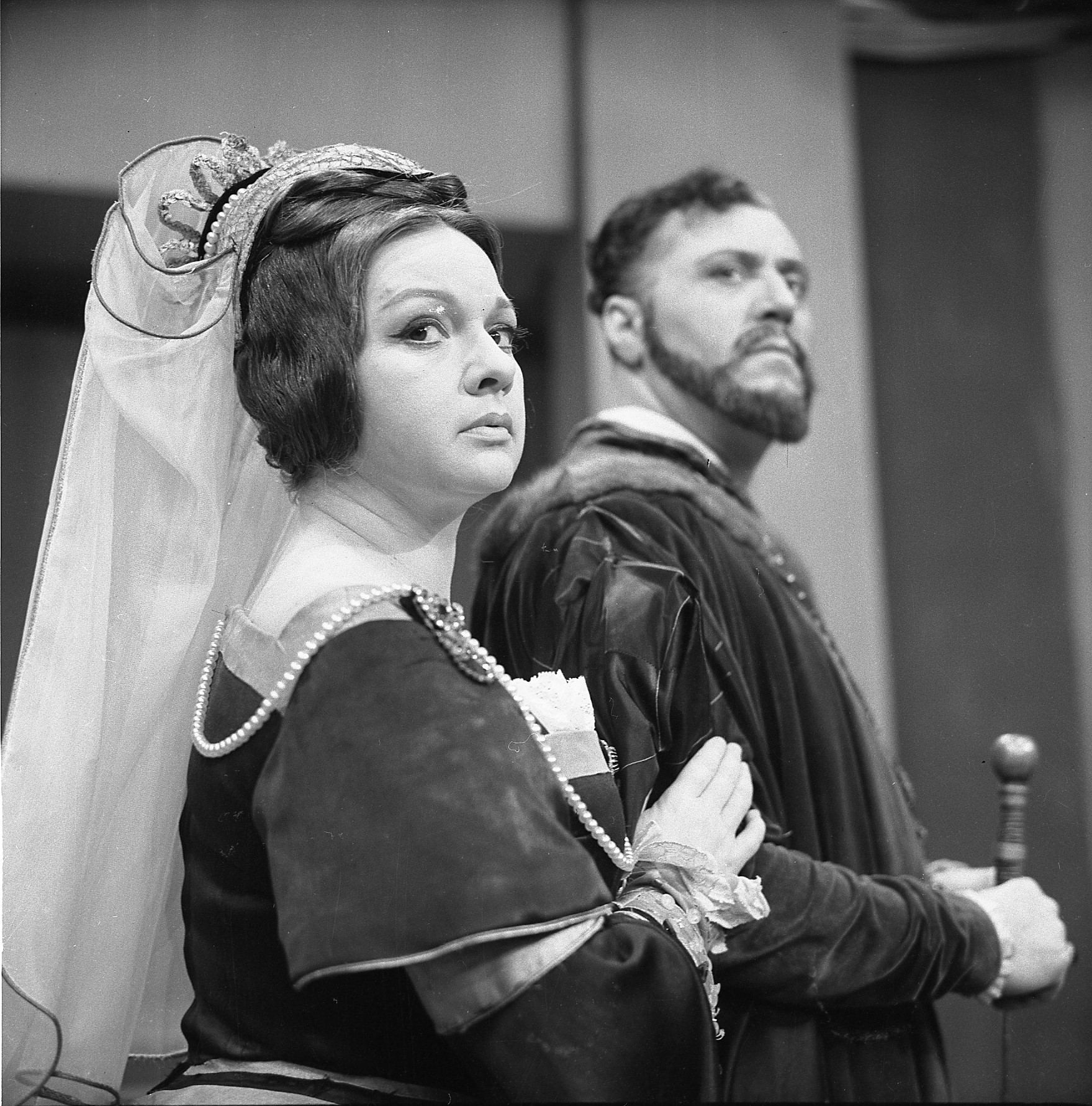
- Spiridonović in 1963 with Mlađa Veselinović on the set of Romeo i Julija TV film.
- Born: 11 June 1923; Split, Kingdom of Serbs, Croats, and Slovenes
- Died: 14 May 1994 (aged 70); Belgrade, FR Yugoslavia
- Occupation: Actress
- Years active: 1957–1993

Olga Spiridonović (Serbian Cyrillic: Олга Спиридоновић; 11 June 1923 – 14 May 1994) was a Serbian film, theatre and television actress who appeared in numerous Yugoslav films.
