= Wojciech Rutkowski =

Polish volleyball player (1935–1994)

Personal information
- Nationality: Polish
- Born: 19 November 1935 Warsaw, Poland
- Died: 29 May 1994 (aged 58) Warsaw, Poland

Sport
- Sport: Volleyball

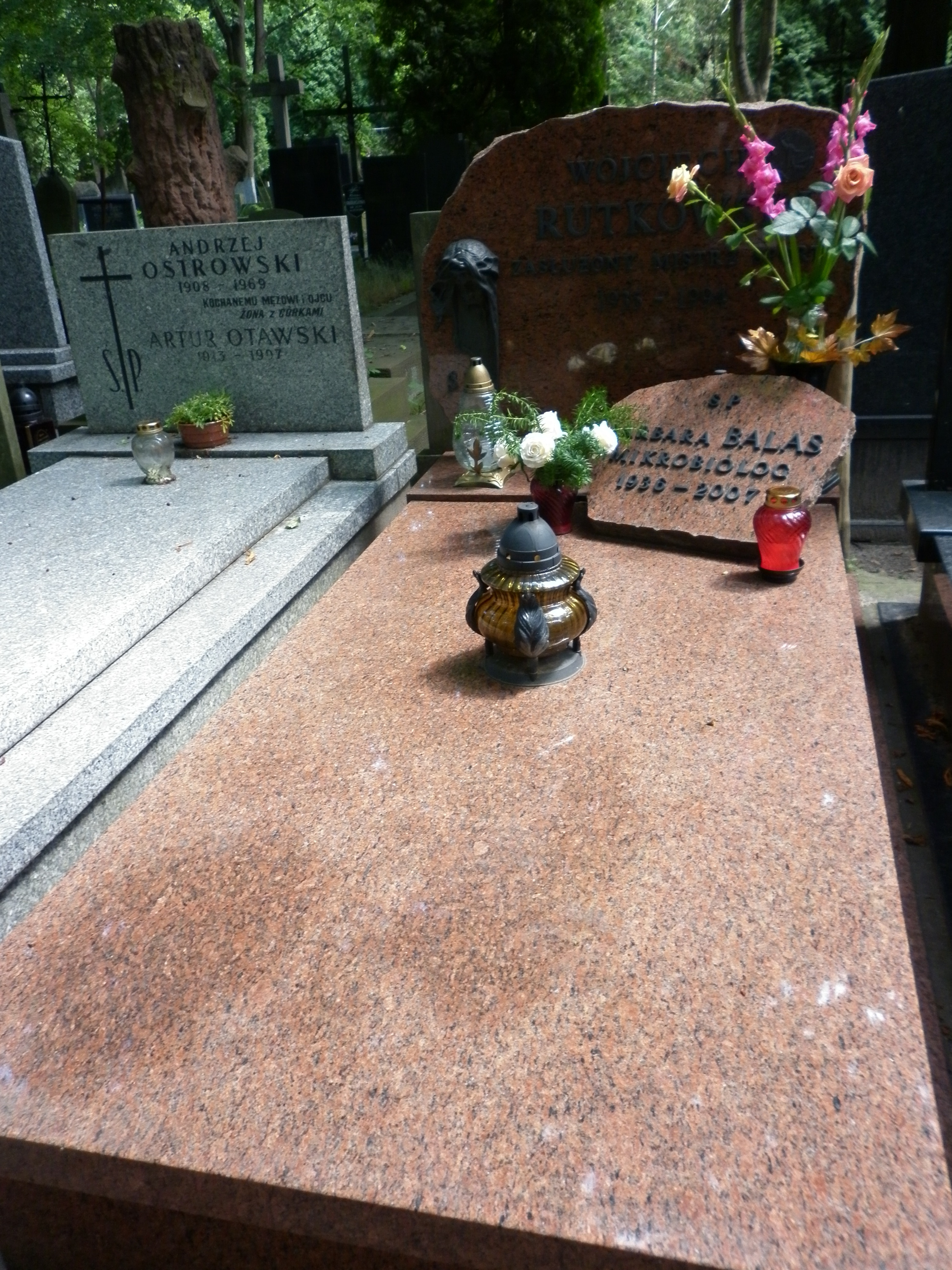
Wojciech Rutkowski's grave at the Powązki Cemetery

Wojciech Rutkowski (19 November 1935 – 29 May 1994) was a Polish volleyball player. He competed in the men's tournament at the 1968 Summer Olympics.
