= Hennie Dijkstra =

Dutch footballer

Personal information
- Full name: Harmen Hendrik Dijkstra
- Date of birth: 25 October 1912
- Place of birth: Zaandam, Netherlands
- Date of death: 1 March 1994 (aged 81)
- Place of death: Zaandam, Netherlands
- Position: Goalkeeper

Senior career*
Years	Team	Apps	(Gls)
1932–1940	ZFC		
1940–1941	APGS		
1942–1948	ZFC		

International career
1939	Netherlands	2	(0)
- * Club domestic league appearances and goals

Hennie Dijkstra (25 October 1912 – 1 March 1994) was a Dutch footballer. He played in two matches for the Netherlands national football team in 1939.

He played his entire career for local club ZFC, except for one season when he was forced to play for police team APGS in Amsterdam after his appointment as a police officer.
