= Sándor Békési =

Hungarian gymnast

- Born: 27 August 1928 Debrecen, Kingdom of Hungary
- Died: 9 March 1994 (aged 65) Budapest, Hungary
- Height: 1.64 m (5 ft 5 in)

Gymnastics career
- Discipline: Men's artistic gymnastics
- Country represented: Hungary
- Club: Budapesti Vasas Sport Club
Medal record
Men's artistic gymnastics
Representing Hungary
World Festival of Youth and Students
Silver medal – second place	1954 Budapest	Team

Sándor Békési (27 August 1928 – 9 March 1994) was a Hungarian gymnast. He competed in eight events at the 1960 Summer Olympics.
