= Fahrettin Akbaş =

Turkish wrestler

Personal information
- Nationality: Turkish
- Born: 1927 Konya, Turkey
- Died: 2 May 1994 (aged 66–67)

Sport
- Sport: Wrestling

Fahrettin Akbaş (1927 – 2 May 1994) was a Turkish wrestler. He competed in the men's Greco-Roman flyweight at the 1952 Summer Olympics.
