= Svend Aage Thomsen (wrestler) =

Danish wrestler

Personal information
- Nationality: Danish
- Born: 19 November 1918; Aalborg, Denmark
- Died: 30 October 1974 (aged 55); Aalborg, Denmark

Sport
- Sport: Wrestling

Svend Aage Thomsen (19 November 1918 – 30 October 1974) was a Danish wrestler. He competed at the 1948 Summer Olympics and the 1952 Summer Olympics.
