= Nikolay Solovyov (wrestler) =

Soviet wrestler

Personal information
- Born: 12 July 1931 Rodniki, Ivanovo Oblast, Russian SFSR, Soviet Union
- Died: 15 November 2007 (aged 76) Saint Petersburg, Russia

Sport
- Sport: Greco-Roman wrestling
- Club: Spartak Saint Petersburg
Medal record
Men's Greco-Roman wrestling
Representing the Soviet Union
Olympic Games
| Gold medal – first place | 1956 Melbourne | 52 kg |

Nikolay Nikolayevich Solovyov (Russian: Николай Николаевич Соловьёв; 12 July 1931 – 15 November 2007) was a flyweight Greco-Roman wrestler from Russia who won a gold medal at the 1956 Olympics.

Solovyov first competed in shooting and fencing, placing sixth in the Soviet foil championships. He then changed to wrestling and won the Soviet title in 1955 and 1959, placing second in 1958 and third in 1954. He graduated from an institute of physical education, and after retiring from competitions trained the Soviet wrestling team. He also served as an international referee and as vice-president of the Saint Petersburg wrestling federation.
