= Serge Afanasyan =

Armenian historian (1913–1994)

Serge Afanasyan (Baku, January 13, 1913 – Paris, May 30, 1994) was an Armenian historian. He was born in Baku. He wrote about the political evolution of the three Caucasian republics - Armenia, Azerbaijan and Georgia - and in particular the story of their brief independence before the establishment of the Soviet regime (i.e. between the years 1917 and 1923). His works include L'Armenie, l'Azerbaidjan et la Georgie: De l'independance a l'instauration du pouvoir sovietique, 1917-1923 and La Victoire de Sardarabad : Arménie, mai 1918.
