= Béla Kenéz =

Hungarian wrestler

Personal information
- Nationality: Hungarian
- Born: 20 December 1922 Cegléd, Hungary
- Died: 31 March 1994 (aged 71) Cegléd, Hungary

Sport
- Sport: Wrestling

Béla Kenéz (20 December 1922 – 31 March 1994) was a Hungarian wrestler. He competed in the men's Greco-Roman flyweight at the 1952 Summer Olympics.
