= Bernie Fyffe =

Australian rules footballer

Personal information
- Full name: Bernie Fyffe
- Born: 22 December 1921
- Died: 9 March 1994 (aged 72)
- Original team: Brunswick
- Height: 163 cm (5 ft 4 in)
- Weight: 65 kg (143 lb)

Playing career^{1}
Years	Club	Games (Goals)
1943	Fitzroy	2 (3)
1944	St Kilda	2 (0)
Total		4 (3)
- ^{1} Playing statistics correct to the end of 1944.

Bernie Fyffe (22 December 1921 – 9 March 1994) was an Australian rules footballer who played for the Fitzroy Football Club and St Kilda Football Club in the Victorian Football League (VFL).
