= Bengt Johansson (wrestler) =

Swedish wrestler (1926–2008)

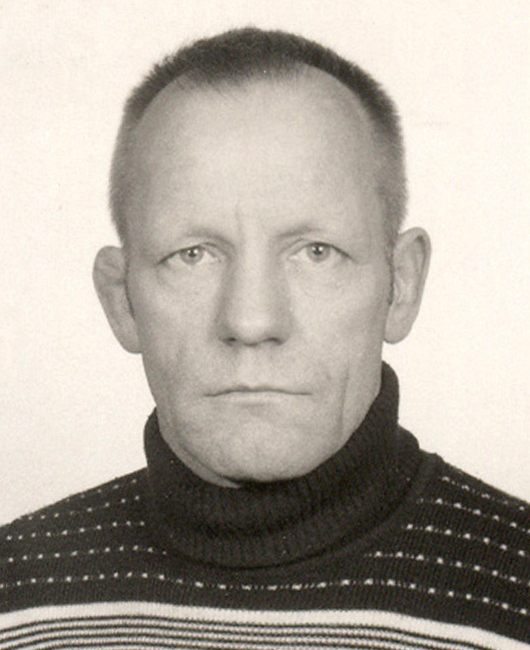

Personal information
- Born: 4 January 1926 Hallsberg, Sweden
- Died: 9 April 2008 (aged 82) Arboga, Sweden

Sport
- Sport: Wrestling
- Club: Hallsbergs BK; Örgryte IS, Göteborg
Medal record
Men's wrestling
Representing Sweden
World Championships
Gold medal – first place	1950 Stockholm	Greco-Roman, −52 kg
Bronze medal – third place	1951 Helsinki	Freestyle, −52 kg
European Championships
Bronze medal – third place	1949 Istanbul	Freestyle, −52 kg

Karl Bengt Johansson (4 January 1926 – 9 April 2008) was a Swedish flyweight wrestler. As a Greco-Roman wrestler he won a world title in 1950 and finished fifth at the 1952 Summer Olympics. In freestyle wrestling he won two bronze medals, at the 1949 European and 1951 world championships.
