= Boris Gurevich (wrestler, born 1931) =

Soviet wrestler

Personal information
- Full name: Boris Maksimovich Gurevich
- Born: 23 March 1931 Moscow, Russian SFSR, Soviet Union
- Died: 10 January 1995 (aged 63) Moscow, Russia

Sport
- Sport: Greco-Roman wrestling
- Club: Burevestnik Moscow
Medal record
Men's Greco-Roman wrestling
Representing the Soviet Union
Olympic Games
Gold medal – first place	1952 Helsinki	52 kg
World Championships
Gold medal – first place	1953 Naples	52 kg
Gold medal – first place	1958 Budapest	52 kg

Boris Maksimovich Gurevich (Russian: Борис Максимович Гуревич; 23 March 1931 – 10 January 1995) was a flyweight Greco-Roman wrestler from the Soviet Union. He won gold medals at the 1952 Olympics, the 1953 world championships, and the 1958 world championships.

Gurevich first trained in gymnastics and later took up wrestling in 1948. He won the Soviet wrestling titles in 1950 and 1955, placed second in 1952, 1959, and 1960, and placed third in 1963. After retiring from competitions he coached wrestlers in Moscow, where an annual international wrestling tournament has been held in his honor since 1996.
