= Maurice Mewis =

Belgian wrestler

Personal information
- Nationality: Belgian
- Born: 16 September 1929; Antwerp, Belgium
- Died: 23 February 2017 (aged 87); Antwerp, Belgium

Sport
- Sport: Wrestling

Maurice Mewis (16 September 1929 – 23 February 2017) was a Belgian wrestler. He competed at the 1952 Summer Olympics, the 1956 Summer Olympics, the 1960 Summer Olympics and the 1964 Summer Olympics.
