= Borivoj Vukov =

Serbian wrestler (1929–2010)

Medal record

Men's Wrestling

Representing Yugoslavia

World Championships
Gold medal – first place	1963 Helsingborg	Flyweight
Bronze medal – third place	1958 Budapest	Flyweight

Mediterranean Games
Silver medal – second place	1959 Beirut	52kg

Borivoje Vukov (July 8, 1929 – July 1, 2010) was a Serbian wrestler who competed in the 1952 Summer Olympics, in the 1956 Summer Olympics, and in the 1960 Summer Olympics. He was born in Senta and died in Belgrade
