= Deaths in June 2004 =

The following is a list of notable deaths in June 2004.

Entries for each day are listed alphabetically by surname. A typical entry lists information in the following sequence:

- Name, age, country of citizenship at birth, subsequent country of citizenship (if applicable), reason for notability, cause of death (if known), and reference.

== June 2004 ==
=== 1 ===
- Randi Brænne, 93, Norwegian actress.
- James Dudley, 94, American baseball player and professional wrestling manager.
- Victor Guazzelli, 84, English Roman Catholic bishop.
- Liu Kang, 93, Singaporean artist.
- Charles Kelman, 74, American ophthalmologist, surgeon, jazz musician, and Broadway producer, lung cancer.
- William Manchester, 82, American author and historian.
- Bill Reichardt, 73, American football player (University of Iowa, Green Bay Packers).
- Sheikh Shaheb Ali, 88, Bangladeshi football player and coach.

=== 2 ===
- Mujeeb Alam, 55, Pakistani playback singer.
- Dietz Otto Edzard, 73, German scholar and grammarian of the Sumerian language.
- Nicolai Ghiaurov, 74, Bulgarian opera singer.
- Shrikant Jichkar, 49, Indian central civil servant and politician, traffic collision.
- Lee Ki-baek, 79, South Korean historian.
- Tesfaye Gebre Kidan, 68–69, Ethiopian general, defense minister and President of Ethiopia, involuntary manslaughter.
- Dom Moraes, 65, Indian poet and writer, heart attack.
- Alun Richards, 74, Welsh novelist.
- Tini Wagner, 84, Dutch freestyle swimmer and Olympic champion (1936).

=== 3 ===
- Nam Cam, 56, Vietnamese mobster, shot.
- Joe Carr, 82, Irish golfer.
- Joe Cleary, 85, American baseball player (Washington Senators).
- Harald Ganzinger, 53, German computer scientist.
- Harold Goodwin, 86, English actor (The Bridge on the River Kwai, The Longest Day, The Ladykillers).
- Britta Holmberg, 82, Swedish actress.
- Jonathan Kramer, 61, American composer and music theorist.
- Frances Shand Kydd, 68, English mother of Diana, Princess of Wales, Parkinson's disease.
- Fernand Leemans, 78, Belgian figure skater and Olympian (1948).
- Sulamith Messerer, 95, Russian ballerina and choreographer.
- Quorthon, 38, Swedish musician and founder of the band Bathory, congenital heart defect.
- Morris Schappes, 97, American scholar, editor (Jewish Currents) and Marxist activist.

=== 4 ===
- Al Clark, 56, American football player (Detroit Lions, Los Angeles Rams, Philadelphia Eagles).
- Charles Correll, 60, American cinematographer (Animal House, Star Trek III: The Search for Spock) and television director (Melrose Place), pancreatic cancer.
- Wilmer Fields, 81, American baseball player, former Negro league baseball All-Star, heart ailment.
- Bill Geyer, 84, American football player (Chicago Bears).
- Marvin Heemeyer, 52, American muffler repair shop owner and criminal, suicide by gunshot.
- Steve Lacy, 69, American jazz soprano saxophonist and composer, cancer.
- Brian Linehan, 58, Canadian television host and interviewer, lymphoma.
- Nino Manfredi, 83, Italian actor, stroke.
- Rolf Moebius, 88, German actor, pneumonia.
- T. M. Samarasinghe, 61, Sri Lankan cricket umpire.
- Anthony Steffen, 73, Italian and Brazilian film actor and screenwriter, cancer.

=== 5 ===
- Johnny Bent, 95, American Olympic ice hockey player (1932).
- Iona Brown, 63, British violinist and conductor, cancer.
- Jack Foster, 72, British-New Zealand athlete and Olympian (1972, 1976), traffic collision.
- Fernando Manzaneque, 70, Spanish road racing cyclist.
- Friedrich Obleser, 81, German general in the Bundeswehr.
- Ronald Reagan, 93, American actor (Kings Row) and politician, President (1981–1989), Governor of California (1967–1975), pneumonia and complications from Alzheimer's.
- Manu Tupou, 69, American-based Fijian actor (Hawaii, Hawaii Five-O, A Man Called Horse).

=== 6 ===
- Ahmed Ali, 65, Pakistani footballer.
- Judy Campbell, 88, English actress.
- Simon Cumbers, 36, Irish freelance cameraman and journalist, killed by Al-Qaeda.
- Howard Eves, 93, American mathematician.
- Babsie Podestá, 92, Maltese Olympic water polo player (1936).
- James Roche, 97, American businessman, CEO and chairman of the board at General Motors Corporation.
- Munavvar Rzayeva, 75, Azerbaijani sculptor.
- Emma Talmi, 99, Israeli politician and writer.
- Jock West, 95, British Grand Prix motorcycle racer.
- Kate Worley, 46, American comic book writer (Omaha the Cat Dancer), cancer.

=== 7 ===
- Roman Aftanazy, 90, Polish historian, librarian and author.
- Richard E. Bush, 79, United States Marine master gunnery sergeant and recipient of the Medal of Honor.
- Joseph Leo Doob, 94, American mathematician.
- Chris Kitsos, 76, American baseball player (Chicago Cubs).
- Roger Matton, 75, Canadian composer, ethnomusicologist, and music educator.
- Bern Porter, 93, American artist, writer, publisher, and performer.
- Don Potter, 102, British sculptor, wood carver and potter.
- Eugene Raskin, 94, American musician and playwright.

=== 8 ===
- Leopoldo Zea Aguilar, 91, Mexican philosopher.
- Dan Armstrong, 69, American guitarist, luthier, and session musician.
- David Mervyn Blow, 72, British biophysicist, lung cancer.
- Walter Breuer, 73, Austrian film actor.
- Per Carleson, 86, Swedish officer and Olympic épée fencer (1948, 1952, 1956).
- Elizabeth Virginia Hallanan, 79, American district judge (United States District Court for the Southern District of West Virginia).
- Mack Jones, 65, American baseball player (Atlanta Braves, Cincinnati Reds and Montreal Expos), stomach cancer.
- Humayun Khan, 27, American soldier serving in the Iraq War, car bombing.
- Kit Lawlor, 81, Irish footballer.
- Bill Lowery, 79, American music entrepreneur.
- Fosco Maraini, 91, Italian photographer, anthropologist, ethnologist, and writer.
- Bob Schmitz, 65, American gridiron football player and scout (Pittsburgh Steelers, Minnesota Vikings), heart attack.
- Nuria Torray, 69, Spanish actress, colorectal cancer.

=== 9 ===
- Rosey Brown, 71, American football player (New York Giants), Pro Football Hall of Famer.
- António de Sousa Franco, 61, Portuguese economist and politician, heart attack.
- Russell Hellman, 86, American politician and member of the Michigan House of Representatives from 1961 to 1980.
- Bent Jædig, 68, Danish jazz musician.
- Ted Martin, 101, Australian cricketer (Western Australia).
- Ralph Moody, 86, American NASCAR driver and team owner.
- Domingos Puglisi, 92, Brazilian Olympic sprinter (1932).
- Hartley Saunders, 60, Bahamian Olympic triple jumper (1964).
- Alistair Taylor, 68, English personal assistant of Brian Epstein, the manager of the Beatles.
- Barbara Whiting, 73, American actress (Those Whiting Girls, Beware, My Lovely, Dangerous When Wet), cancer.
- Brian Williamson, 58, Jamaican gay rights activist and founder of J-Flag, murdered.

=== 10 ===
- Antoine Argoud, 89, French Army officer specializing in counter-insurgency.
- Ray Charles, 73, American rhythm and blues singer ("What'd I Say", "Georgia on my Mind", "I Can't Stop Loving You"), liver failure.
- Rosinha de Valença, 62, Brazilian composer, arranger and musician.
- Kiki Djan, 47, Ghanaian musician, AIDS and drug-related complications.
- Chico Faria, 54, Portuguese football player.
- José Farías, 67, Argentine football player and manager.
- Odette Laure, 87, French actress and cabaret singer, heart attack.
- Gábor Vékony, 59, Hungarian historian, archaeologist and linguist.
- Xenophon Zolotas, 100, Greek economist and politician, Prime Minister (1989–1990).

=== 11 ===
- Prince Egon von Fürstenberg, 57, German aristocrat and designer, nephew of late Fiat head Gianni Agnelli, liver cancer.
- William Lofgren, 91, American Olympic canoeist (1936).
- Pakubuwono XII, 60, Indonesian royal as twelfth Susuhunan (ruler of Surakarta).
- Michel Roche, 64, French Olympic equestrian (1976).
- Galina Serdyukovskaya, 82, Russian hygienist, academic and politician.
- Soriba Soumah, 58, Guinean international football player and Olympian (1968).

=== 12 ===
- Rina Ben-Menahem, 68, Israeli writer.
- Marianne Erismann, 73, Swiss Olympic swimmer (1948).
- Walter George Muelder, 97, American social ethicist and Methodist minister.
- Stanley O'Toole, 65, British film producer.
- Geoffrey Thompson, 67, British businessman, aneurysm.

=== 13 ===
- Doğan Acarbay, 77, Turkish Olympic sprinter (1948, 1952).
- Dorothy Lavinia Brown, 85, American surgeon and politician.
- Danny Dark, 65, American announcer, pulmonary hemorrhage.
- Dick Durrance, 89, American alpine ski racer, 17-time national champion and Olympian (1936).
- Stuart Hampshire, 89, British philosopher.
- Jørn Larsen, 77, Danish painter and sculptor.
- Robert Lees, 91, American screenwriter, decapitation.
- Jennifer Nitsch, 37, German television actress, suicide by jumping.
- Ralph Wiley, 52, American sports journalist, heart attack.

=== 14 ===
- Ubaldo Calabresi, 79, Italian Roman Catholic bishop, Parkinson's disease.
- Ulrich Inderbinen, 103, Swiss mountain guide.
- Whitman Knapp, 95, American district judge (United States District Court for the Southern District of New York).
- Jack McClelland, 81, Canadian book publisher.
- Blondie Pienaar, 78, South African Olympic wrestler (1952).
- Max Rosenberg, 89, American producer of horror movies.
- Travis West, 37, American Olympic wrestler (1992).
- Noriaki Yuasa, 70, Japanese director, stroke.

=== 15 ===
- Lothar Fischer, 70, German sculptor.
- Norene Forbes, 89, American swimmer and Olympian (1932).
- J. Gwyn Griffiths, 92, Welsh poet and egyptologist.
- Bagong Kussudiardja, 75, Indonesian painter, choreographer, and artist, diabetes.
- Ahmet Piriştina, 52, Turkish politician, mayor of İzmir, heart attack.
- Hatch Rosdahl, 62, American gridiron football player (Penn State, Buffalo Bills, Kansas City Chiefs), suicide by jumping.

=== 16 ===
- Rob Derksen, 44, American baseball coach, manager, and scout.
- Herman Goldstine, 90, American computer scientist (ENIAC), Parkinson's disease.
- George Hausmann, 88, American baseball player (New York Giants).
- Thanom Kittikachorn, 92, Thai military dictator and politician, prime minister, complications from stroke.
- Paul Neagu, 66, British artist.

=== 17 ===
- Todor Dinov, 84, Bulgarian animator, painter, and graphic artist.
- Alfred Jacomis, 93, French Olympic cross-country skier (1936).
- Ma Jiajue, 23, Chinese biochemistry student, execution by shooting.
- Bent Jørgensen, 81, Danish Olympic cyclist (1952).
- Vilayat Inayat Khan, 87, British sufist.
- Jacek Kuroń, 70, Polish dissident and statesman.
- Sara Lidman, 80, Swedish writer.
- Gerry McNeil, 78, Canadian ice hockey player (Montreal Canadiens), Stanley Cup-winning National Hockey League goaltender.
- Jackie Paris, 79, American jazz singer and guitarist.
- Seymour Robbie, 84, American television director.

=== 18 ===
- Abdel Aziz al-Muqrin, 33, Saudi Arabian leader of militant organization al-Qaeda.
- Doris Dowling, 81, American actress.
- George Buck Flower, 66, American actor, writer, producer, and casting director, cancer.
- Chen Fuzhao, c. 30, Chinese serial killer, execution by shooting.
- André Gillois, 102, French writer and Charles de Gaulle's spokesman in London during World War II.
- Dragomir Ilic, 78, Yugoslav footballer.
- Frederick Jaeger, 76, German-British character actor.
- Paul Marshall Johnson Jr., c. 49, American hostage, decapitated by al-Qaeda.
- Shaikh Hafiz Sabri Koçi, 83, Albanian Grand Mufti.
- Elbert Luther Little, 96, American botanist.
- Ralph S. Locher, 88, American politician.
- John Mathwin, 84, Australian politician.
- Peter Märthesheimer, 66, German screenwriter, producer and author.
- Nek Muhammad Wazir, c. 27, Pakistani tribal leader and Taliban ally, killed by Pakistani military forces.
- Moe Radovich, 75, American basketball player (Philadelphia Warriors) and college basketball coach.
- Antonio Schenatti, 69, Italian Olympic cross-country skier (1960).
- Elwood Zimmerman, 91, American entomologist.

=== 19 ===
- Nikolai Girenko, 63, Russian ethnologist and human rights activist, ballistic trauma.
- Charly Grosskost, 60, French racing cyclist, traffic collision.
- Ken Love, 76, American racing driver.
- Colin McCormack, 62, Welsh actor, cancer.
- Else Quecke, 96, German actress.
- Jadwiga Rutkowska, 70, Polish Olympic volleyball player (1964).
- Alfredo Torero, 73, Peruvian anthropologist and linguist.
- Nob Yoshigahara, 68, Japanese mathematician and puzzle expert.

=== 20 ===
- Munir al-Ajlani, 91, Syrian politician, writer, lawyer, and scholar.
- Jim Bacon, 54, Australian politician, Premier of Tasmania (1998–2004), lung cancer.
- Robert Rogers Blake, 86, American management theoretician.
- Hanns Cibulka, 83, German poet and diarist.
- Fred Cogswell, 86, Canadian poet.
- Luis Contreras, 53, Hispanic-American actor.
- Nabil Sahraoui, 37, Algerian militant, head of GSPC, killed by the Algerian army.

=== 21 ===
- Ruth Leach Amonette, 87, American businesswoman, author, and educator.
- Ron Ashman, 78, English football player and manager.
- Leonel Brizola, 82, Brazilian politician, heart failure.
- Ted Scott, 85, Canadian Anglican prelate, traffic collision.

=== 22 ===
- Bob Bemer, 84, American computer scientist, cancer.
- Francisco Ortiz Franco, 50, Mexican journalist, murdered.
- Thomas Gold, 84, American astrophysicist.
- Carlton Skinner, 91, American naval officer and politician, first civilian governor of Guam.
- Mattie Stepanek, 13, American poet and advocate, muscular dystrophy.
- Kim Sun-il, 33, South Korean translator, decapitated by Iraqi militants.

=== 23 ===
- Peter Birrel, 68, English actor (Doctor Who), cancer.
- Rifaat El-Fanagily, 68, Egyptian footballer and Olympian (1960, 1964).
- Ya'akov Meshorer, 68, Israeli numismatist and classical archaeologist, cancer.
- Leonard Stein, 87, American musicologist, pianist, conductor and university teacher.
- Angelo Tommasi, 92, Italian Olympic high jumper (1932).

=== 24 ===
- Carlos Lacoste, 75, Argentine navy vice-admiral and politician.
- Bill Pataky, 74, Canadian Olympic basketball player (1952).
- Jimmy Rowser, 78, American jazz double-bassist.
- Trudeliese Schmidt, 61, German operatic mezzo-soprano.
- Arnold Stone, 94, Canadian Olympic ski jumper (1932).
- Peter Wragg, 73, British footballer.

=== 25 ===
- Morton W. Coutts, 100, New Zealand scientist and inventor.
- Imanol Larzabal Goñi, 56, Basque Spanish singer and composer.
- Margot Guilleaume, 94, German operatic soprano.
- Karol Kennedy, 72, American ice skating champion and Olympian (1948, 1952), pneumonia.
- Robert Malcolm McRae Jr., 82, American district judge (United States District Court for the Western District of Tennessee).
- Fred Ramdat Misier, 77, Suriname politician, president (1982–1988.)
- Carl Rakosi, 100, Hungarian-American poet, the last surviving member of the Objectivist poets.
- Bruno De Zordo, 62, Italian Olympic ski jumper (1964).

=== 26 ===
- Muriel Angelus, 95, British silent film actress.
- Ott Arder, 54, Estonian poet, children's writer and translator.
- George Charles, 88, Saint Lucia trade unionist and politician.
- Chaim Goldberg, 87, Polish-Israeli-American artist, painter, and sculptor.
- Yash Johar, 75, Indian Bollywood film producer.
- Naomi Shemer, 74, Israeli songwriter, cancer.
- Frank Teräskari, 82, Finnish weightlifter and Olympian (1948, 1952).
- Nguyen Van Hinh, 88, Vietnamese Chief of staff and general.

=== 27 ===
- Peter Blythe, 69, English actor, lung cancer.
- Humayun Kabir Balu, 56, Bangladeshi journalist, bombing.
- Hugh B. Cave, 93, British writer.
- Derrick Faison, 36, American football player (Los Angeles Rams).
- Jean Graczyk, 71, French road cyclist and Olympian (1956).
- Petar Gračanin, 81, Yugoslav and Serbian politician and general in the Yugoslav People's Army.
- Boris Holban, 96, Russian-born Franco-Romanian communist.
- Sigurd Iversen, 78, Danish footballer.
- Evelyn de Lacy, 86, Australian swimmer and Olympian (1936).
- Paul Norman, 52, British scientist, plane crash.
- George Patton IV, 80, American army general and son of George Patton, Parkinson's disease.
- Fausto Romitelli, 41, Italian composer, cancer.

=== 28 ===
- Jean Boyer, 55, French organist and music professor, cancer.
- Anthony Buckeridge, 92, English author, creator of the Jennings books.
- Georges de Caunes, 85, French journalist, writer and television and radio presenter, aneurysm.
- Marcel Jullian, 82, French author and screenwriter.
- Hisashi Nozawa, 44, Japanese screenwriter and mystery novelist, suicide by hanging.
- Alexander Spirkin, 85, Soviet and Russian philosopher and psychologist.
- Hal Toenes, 86, American baseball player (Washington Senators).
- Thomas Zereske, 38, German Olympic canoeist (1988, 1996, 2000), leukemia.

=== 29 ===
- Bjørn Breigutu, 80, Norwegian filmmaker.
- Alvin Hamilton, 92, Canadian politician.
- William W. Havens Jr., 84, American physicist, complications from leukemia.
- Arik Lavie, 77, Israeli singer and actor, heart disease.
- Mohammad Ranjbar, 69, Iranian football player and coach, cerebral disorder.
- Grethe Thordahl, 77, Danish stage and film actress.
- Stipe Šuvar, 68, Croatian and Yugoslav politician and sociologist.

=== 30 ===
- Chris Alcaide, 80, American actor, cancer.
- Pascual Batista, 78, Argentine Olympic rower (1948).
- Roy Bull, 75, Australian rugby league footballer.
- Eddie Burns, 88, Australian rugby player and coach.
- Geoff Goodacre, 77, Australian hurdler and Olympian (1956).
- Jacques Rossi, 94, Polish-French writer and polyglot.
- Stive Vermaut, 28, Belgian cyclist, brain haemorrhage after heart attack.
