= Lebanon at the 1951 Mediterranean Games =

- IOC code: LIB
- NOC: Lebanese Olympic Committee

in Alexandria
- Competitors: 48
- Medals Ranked 8th: Gold 0 Silver 5 Bronze 14 Total 19

Mediterranean Games appearances (overview)
- 1951; 1955; 1959; 1963; 1967; 1971; 1975; 1979; 1983; 1987; 1991; 1993; 1997; 2001; 2005; 2009; 2013; 2018; 2022

== Medal table ==
Place	Nation	1st place, gold medalist(s)	2nd place, silver medalist(s)	3rd place, bronze medalist(s)	Total
1	Italy	27	22	12	61
2	France	26	13	5	44
3	Egypt	20	26	19	65
4	Turkey	10	3	7	20
5	Greece	4	9	8	21
6	Yugoslavia	3	5	7	17
7	Spain	2	4	4	10
8	Lebanon	0	5	14	19
9	Syria	0	3	10	13
Total		92	90	86	268

== Lebanese medals by sport ==
Sport	Gold	Silver	Bronze	Total
Wrestling	0	3	7	10
Boxing	0	1	3	4
Weightlifting	0	1	2	3
Shooting	0	0	1	1
Totals (4 entries)	0	5	13	18

== Lebanese Medal winners ==
Event	Gold	Silver	Bronze
BOXING (– 71 Kg)	Gharib Afifi (EGY)	Joseph Habis (LIB)	Salah el Masri (SYR)
Boxing (– 60 Kg)	Saleh Abbas (EGY)	Franco Giannini (ITA)	Tawfiq Habashi (LIB)
Boxing (– 63.5 Kg)	Bruno Vesintin (ITA)	Mohyeddin Elhamaki (EGY)	Kamal Afra (LIB)
Boxing (– 81 Kg)	G-B Alfonsetti (ITA)	Mohammad El Minibavi (EGY)	Abdel Wahab El Halabi (LIB)
SHOOTING (– pistolet 50m)	Angel Leon Gozalo (ESP) 536 pts	Luis Palomo (ESP) 521 pts	Abdel Satar Traboulsi (LIB) 520 pts
WEIGHTLIFTING (– 75 Kg)	Khadr el Sayed el Touni (EGY) 392.5 Kg	Mustafa Laham (LIB) 362.5 Kg	Georges Firmin (FRA) 362.5 Kg
Weightlifting (– 56 Kg)	Kamal Mahgoub (EGY) 292.5 Kg	Marcel Thevenet (FRA) 260 Kg	Salim Moussa (LIB) 247.5 Kg
Weightlifting (– 82.5 Kg)	Jean Debuf (FRA) 390 Kg	Awad Khalil Arabi (EGY) 380 Kg	Mohamad Makuk (LIB) 315 Kg
WRESTLING (– FREE 87 Kg)	Baktas Can (TUR)	Michel Skaff (LIB)	Abdallah (EGY)
Wrestling (– free 62 Kg)	Bayram Sit (TUR)	Abdel Essawi (EGY)	Elie Naassan (LIB)
Wrestling (– free 67 Kg)	Tevfik Yuce (TUR)	Garibaldo Nizzola (ITA)	Asad Eid (LIB)
Wrestling (– free 79 Kg)	Ismet Atli (TUR)	Abdou Hassan (EGY)	Michel Eid (LIB)
WRESTLING (– GRECO-ROMAN 67 Kg)	Kamel Balbaa (EGY)	Ibrahim Damaj (LIB)	Umberto Trippa (ITA)
Wrestling (– Greco-Roman 73 Kg)	Adel Mustapha (EGY)	Khalil Taha (LIB)	Halabi (SYR)
Wrestling (– Greco-Roman 57 Kg)	Ali Mahmoud Hassan (EGY)	Cocco (ITA)	Zakaria Chehab (LIB)
Wrestling (– Greco-Roman 62 Kg)	Randi (ITA)	Sayed Kandil (EGY)	Ibrahim Bayonne (LIB)
Wrestling (– Greco-Roman 79 Kg)	Cerroni (ITA)	M Hassan Musa (EGY)	Asad Eid (LIB)
Wrestling (– Greco-Roman 87 Kg)	Umberto Silvestri (ITA)	Ibrahim Orabi (EGY)	Michel Skaff (LIB)

Note 1: there must be a 14th bronze according to the medal tables

Note 2: Michel skaff won the silver in the 87 free wrestling and the bronze in the 87 kg Greco-Roman

Note 3: however, Asad EID won 2 bronzes in the free wrestling 67 kg and grecoroman 79 kg ?? either there is an error, or there's 2 Asad eid.

== Medalists ==
Medal	Name	Sport	Event
Silver	Joseph Habis	Boxing	71 Kg
Silver	Mustapha Laham	Weightlifting	75 Kg
Silver	Michel Skaff	Wrestling	Free 87 Kg
Silver	Ibrahim Damaj	Wrestling	GrecoRoman 67 Kg
Silver	Khalil Taha	Wrestling	GrecoRoman 73 Kg
Bronze	Tawfiq Habashi	Boxing	60 Kg
Bronze	Kamal Afra	Boxing	63.5 Kg
Bronze	Abdel Wahab El Halabi	Boxing	81 Kg
Bronze	Abdel Satar Traboulsi	Shooting	pistolet 50m
Bronze	Salim Moussa	Weightlifting	56 Kg
Bronze	Mohamad Makuk	Weightlifting	82.5 Kg
Bronze	Elie Naassan	Wrestling	free 62 Kg
Bronze	Asad Eid	Wrestling	free 67 Kg
Bronze	Michel Eid	Wrestling	free 79 Kg
Bronze	Zakaria Chehab	Wrestling	GrecoRoman 57 Kg
Bronze	Ibrahim Bayonne	Wrestling	GrecoRoman 62 Kg
Bronze	Asad Eid	Wrestling	GrecoRoman 79 Kg
Bronze	Michel Skaff	Wrestling	GrecoRoman 87 Kg
