= Weightlifting at the 1955 Mediterranean Games =

- Location: Barcelona, Spain
- Dates: 15–25 July 1955

The weightlifting tournament at the 1955 Mediterranean Games was held in Barcelona, Spain. Medals were contested in seven men’s weight classes, with athletes from Egypt, Italy, France, Lebanon, and Syria among the medalists. The detailed results and medal standings are available in the official Mediterranean Games report and in external sports records.

== Medal table ==
* Host nation (Spain)

Rank	Nation	Gold	Silver	Bronze	Total
1	Egypt	3	4	0	7
2	Italy	2	2	2	6
3	France	1	1	2	4
4	Lebanon	1	0	2	3
5	Syria	0	0	1	1
Totals (5 entries)		7	7	7	21

== Medal summary ==
=== Men's events ===
Event	Gold		Silver		Bronze	
56 kg	Kamal Mahmoud Mahgoub (EGY)	297.5 kg	Marc Marcombe (FRA)	280 kg	Salim Moussa (LBN)	262.5 kg
60 kg	Sebastiano Mannironi (ITA)	330 kg	Ali Mahgoub (EGY)	317.5 kg	Haroutioun Djoubanian (LBN)	302.5 kg
67.5 kg	Said Khalifa Gouda (EGY)	365 kg	Luciano De Genova (ITA)	342.5 kg	Bahjat Dalloul (SYR)	322.5 kg
75 kg	Moustafa Laham (LBN)	380 kg	Ismail Ragab (EGY)	372.5 kg	Ermanno Pignatti (ITA)	355 kg
82.5 kg	Mohamed Ali Abdel Kerim (EGY)	405 kg	Augusto Fiorentini (ITA)	375 kg	Georges Firmin (FRA)	365 kg
90 kg	Jean Debuf (FRA)	420 kg	Mohamed Ibrahim Saleh (EGY)	400 kg	Gerolamo Rovegno (ITA)	382.5 kg
+90 kg	Alberto Pigaiani (ITA)	422.5 kg	Mohamed Ahmed Gaessa (EGY)	395 kg	Raymond Herbaux (FRA)	377.5 kg
