= Kinnunen =

Kinnunen is a Finnish surname. Notable people with the surname include:

- Antti Kinnunen (1903–1979), Finnish farmer and politician
- Armas Kinnunen (1900–1964), Finnish middle-distance runner
- Caitlin Kinnunen (born 1991), American actress
- Eero Kinnunen (born 1967), Estonian military officer
- Heikki Kinnunen (born 1946), Finnish actor
- Hilkka Kinnunen (1925–2026), Finnish actress and opera singer
- Jarkko Kinnunen (born 1984), Finnish racewalker
- Jorma Kinnunen (1941–2019), Finnish athlete
- Juho Kinnunen, multiple people
- Juri Kinnunen (born 1990), Finnish association football player
- Keith Thomas Kinnunen (born 1976), perpetrator of the West Freeway Church of Christ shooting
- Kimmo Kinnunen (born 1968), Finnish javelin thrower
- Laila Kinnunen (1939–2000), Finnish singer
- Leo Kinnunen (1943–2017), Finnish racing driver
- Martin Kinnunen (born 1983), Swedish-Finnish politician
- Mike Kinnunen (born 1958), American baseball player
- Mikko Kinnunen (born 1967), Finnish politician
- Nastassia Kinnunen (born 1985), Finnish-Belarusian cross-country skier and biathlete
- Saku Kinnunen (born 1995), Finnish ice hockey player
- Santeri Kinnunen (born 1969), Finnish actor; the son of Heikki Kinnunen
- Santtu Kinnunen (born 1999), Finnish ice hockey player
- Sigvard Kinnunen (1920–1954), Swedish weightlifter
- Tapio Kinnunen (born 1954), Finnish weightlifter
- Tero Kinnunen (born 1973), Finnish heavy metal musician
- Toivo Kinnunen (1905–1977), Finnish farmer and politician
- Tuija Kinnunen (born 1965), Finnish cyclist
