= Lebanon at the 1963 Mediterranean Games =

Sporting event delegation

- IOC code: LIB
- NOC: Lebanese Olympic Committee

in Naples, Italy
- Medals Ranked 11th: Gold 0 Silver 0 Bronze 1 Total 1

Mediterranean Games appearances (overview)
- 1951; 1955; 1959; 1963; 1967; 1971; 1975; 1979; 1983; 1987; 1991; 1993; 1997; 2001; 2005; 2009; 2013; 2018; 2022

== Medal table ==
Rank	Nation	Gold	Silver	Bronze	Total
1	Italy	32	21	16	69
2	Turkey	10	3	4	17
3	France	8	14	8	30
4	Yugoslavia	6	8	8	22
5	United Arab Republic	5	13	9	27
6	Spain	4	4	12	20
7	Syria	0	1	3	4
8	Tunisia	0	1	1	2
9	Morocco	0	0	7	7
10	Greece	0	0	5	5
11	Lebanon	0	0	1	1
11	Monaco	0	0	1	1
Totals (12 entries)		65	65	75	205

== Lebanese medals by sport ==
Sport	Gold	Silver	Bronze	Total
Wrestling	0	0	1	1
Totals (1 entries)	0	0	1	1

== Lebanese Medal winners ==
Event	Gold	Silver	Bronze
WRESTLING (– Free heavy weight)	Unal (TUR)	El Said (EGY)	Mohamed Noueiri (LIB)

== Medalists ==
Medal	Name	Sport	Event
Bronze	Mohamed Noueiri	Wrestling	Free heavy weight
