= Lebanon at the 1959 Mediterranean Games =

- IOC code: LIB
- NOC: Lebanese Olympic Committee

in Beirut, Lebanon
- Medals Ranked 8th: Gold 3 Silver 10 Bronze 17 Total 30

Mediterranean Games appearances (overview)
- 1951; 1955; 1959; 1963; 1967; 1971; 1975; 1979; 1983; 1987; 1991; 1993; 1997; 2001; 2005; 2009; 2013; 2018; 2022

Lebanon hosted the 3rd Mediterranean Games in Camille Chamoun sports city in Beirut. The event took place from 11 to 23 October 1959. 11 nations were represented by a total of 792 athletes, all males, competing in 17 sports of 106 events. France came first: its 66 athletes won 69 medals (26 gold), while the host country, Lebanon, with the most athletes (180), came 8th with 30 medals (only 3 golds). The United Arab Republic, participating for the first and only time as Egypt and Syria, came second (the UAR in the 1963 games included only Egypt).

Lebanon won most of its medals in wrestling, weightlifting, and equestrian sports. after 2 bronzes in the 2 previous games, Elie Naasan struck gold this time in wrestling for Lebanon.

== Medal table ==
* Host nation (Lebanon)

Rank	Nation	Gold	Silver	Bronze	Total
1	France	26	27	16	69
2	United Arab Republic	23	21	30	74
3	Turkey	13	8	1	22
4	Italy	12	5	4	21
5	Yugoslavia	11	9	8	28
6	Greece	8	9	13	30
7	Spain	5	12	12	29
8	Lebanon*	3	10	17	30
9	Tunisia	3	2	1	6
10	Morocco	2	3	2	7
Totals (10 entries)		106	106	104	316

== Lebanese medals by sport ==
Sport	Gold	Silver	Bronze	Total
Equestrian	2	1	3	6
Wrestling	1	2	4	7
Weightlifting	0	2	5	7
Boxing	0	2	1	3
Fencing	0	1	1	2
Shooting	0	1	1	2
Sailing	0	1	0	1
Football	0	0	1	1
Volleyball	0	0	1	1
Totals (9 entries)	3	10	17	30

== Lebanese medalists by sport ==
=== Gold ===
1- EQUESTRIAN Arab horses - sport city prize 1. Lebanon 2. U.A.R. (Egypt + Syria) 3. Lebanon

2- EQUESTRIAN Arab horses - cedars prize 1. Lebanon 2. Lebanon 3. Lebanon

3- WRESTLING - 63 kg - 1. Elie Naasan (LEB) 2. Moustafa Mansour (UAR) 3. Niyazi Tanelli (TUR)

=== Silver ===
1- BOXING - 75 kg - 1. Abdelaziz Salah El Hasni (TUN) 2. Hani Zebib (LEB) 3. Anwar Saed Allah Houlta (UAR)

2- BOXING - +81 kg - 1. Mahmoud El Kelany (UAR), 2. Saad El Din Dgheili (LEB)

3- FENCING - team Épée - 1. France 6 pts 2. Liban 4 pts 3. Espagne 2 pts

4- EQUESTRIAN Arab horses - cedars prize 1. Lebanon 2. Lebanon 3. Lebanon

5- SAILING - Flying Dutchman - 1. Grèce 9.0 pts 2. LEBANON 6.0 pts 3. UAR 5.0 pts

6- SHOOTING - olympic pit - team event - 1. UAR 753 pts 2. LEBANON 751 pts 3. Grèce 738 pts

7- WEIGHTLIFTING - 56 kg - 1. Enrique Gomez de Salazar (ESP), 260 kg 2. Abdul Rahman Tabohe (LIB), 237,5 kg 3. Mohamed Ali Abdel Kerim (UAR), 200 kg

8- WEIGHTLIFTING - + 90 kg - 1. Mohamed Mahmoud Ibrahim (UAR), 425 kg 2. Kevork Lahamdjian (LIB), 352,5 kg

9- WRESTLING - FREE 57 kg - 1. Bayram Uysal (TUR) 2. Hani Ibrahim Mounteche (LEB) 3. Ibrahim Ahmed Abdelatif (UAR)

10- WRESTLING - GRECO-ROMAN 57 kg - 1. Aly Kamal El Sayed (UAR) 2. Michel Nacouzi (LEB) 3. Mihail Theodoropoulos (GRE)

=== Bronze ===
1- BOXING - 63,5 kg - 1. Sayed Mahmoud El Nahass (UAR) 2. Fuat Birol (TUR) 3. Georges Costi (LIB)

2- FENCING - team Fleuret - 1. France 5 victories 2. U.A.R 4 vict 3. LEBANON 2 vict

3- FOOTBALL - 1. Italy 2. Turkey 3. LEBANON

4- EQUESTRIAN Arab horses - 1. Capt Jalabi (UAR), 8 pts 2. Kabbari Mohamed Hammad (UAR), 8 ¼ pts 3. Pierre Asseily (LEB), 11 ¾ pts

5- EQUESTRIAN Arab horses - sport-city award - 1. Lebanon 2. République Arabe Unie 3. LEBANON

6- EQUESTRIAN Arab horses - cedars prize 1. Lebanon 2. Lebanon 3. Lebanon

7- SHOOTING - olympic pit individual - 1. Georgios Pangalos (GRE), 193/200 pts 2. Mohamed Ezzedine Badraoui (UAR), 192 pts 3. Aref Diab (LEB), 191 pts

8- VOLLEYBALL - 1. Italie 2. Turquie 3. LEBANON

9- WEIGHTLIFTING - 60 kg - 1. Mohamed Housni Abbas (UAR), 322,5 kg 2. Mustafa Ahmed El Chikhani (UAR), 315 kg 3. Saleh Chammas (LEB), 295 kg

10- WEIGHTLIFTING - 67,5 kg - 1. Mohamed Fauzi (UAR), 357,5 kg 2. Roger Gerber (FRA), 350 kg 3. Noureddine Badre (LEB), 297,5 kg

11- WEIGHTLIFTING - 75 kg - 1. Khadr ESSayed El Touni (UAR), 387,5 kg 2. Rolf Maier (FRA), 367,5 kg 3. Mohamed Mourtada (LEB), 345 kg

12- WEIGHTLIFTING - 82,5 kg - 1. Marcel Paterni (FRA), 402,5 kg 2. Metin Gurman (TUR), 367,5 kg 3. Issameddine Khodr Agha (LEB), 322,5 kg

13- WEIGHTLIFTING - 90 kg - 1. Mohamed Ali Abdel Kerim (UAR), 392,5 kg 2. Juan Renom Ribes (ESP), 327,5 kg 3. Mohamed El Kayssi (LEB), 320 kg

14- WRESTLING - FREE 79 kg - 1. Ziya Dogan (TUR) 2. Mohamed Raafat Wahdan (UAR) 3. André Saade (LEB)

15- WRESTLING - FREE + 87 kg - 1. Hamit Kaplan (TUR) 2. Mohamed Mahmoud El Sharkawi (UAR) 3. Abbas Moussoulmani (LEB)

16- WRESTLING - GRECOROMAN 79 kg - 1. Ziya Dogan (TUR) 2. Mohamed Raafat Wahdan (UAR) 3. Yacoub Romanos (LEB)

17- WRESTLING - GRECOROMAN 87 kg - 1. Tevfik Kis (TUR) 2. Maurice Jacquel (FRA) 3. Jean Saade (LEB)
