= Weightlifting at the 1952 Summer Olympics – Men's 82.5 kg =

Men's 82.5 kg at the Games of the XV Olympiad
- Venue: Messuhalli
- Date: 27 July 1952
- Competitors: 22 from 19 nations
- Winning total: 417.5 kg =OR

Medalists
1st place, gold medalist(s)		Trofim Lomakin	Soviet Union
2nd place, silver medalist(s)		Stanley Stanczyk	United States
3rd place, bronze medalist(s)		Arkady Vorobyov	Soviet Union

The men's 82.5 kg weightlifting competitions at the 1952 Summer Olympics in Helsinki took place on 27 July at Messuhalli. It was the seventh appearance of the light heavyweight class.

Each weightlifter had three attempts at each of the three lifts. The best score for each lift was summed to give a total. The weightlifter could increase the weight between attempts (minimum of 5 kg between first and second attempts, 2.5 kg between second and third attempts) but could not decrease weight. If two or more weightlifters finished with the same total, the competitors' body weights were used as the tie-breaker (lighter athlete wins).

== Records ==
Prior to this competition, the existing world and Olympic records were as follows.

World record	Press	Grigory Novak (URS)	143 kg		1949
World record	Snatch	Arkady Vorobyov (URS)	153.5 kg		1951
World record	Clean & Jerk	Henri Ferrari (FRA)	169 kg		1945
World record	Total	Grigory Novak (URS)	425 kg	Paris, France	19 October 1946
Olympic record	Press	Stanley Stanczyk (USA)	130 kg	London, United Kingdom	11 August 1948
Olympic record	Snatch	Stanley Stanczyk (USA)	130 kg	London, United Kingdom	11 August 1948
Olympic record	Clean & Jerk	Stanley Stanczyk (USA)	157.5 kg	London, United Kingdom	11 August 1948
Olympic record	Total	Stanley Stanczyk (USA)	417.5 kg	London, United Kingdom	11 August 1948

== Results ==
Rank	Athlete	Nation	Body weight	Press (kg)				Snatch (kg)				Clean & Jerk (kg)				Total
Rank	Athlete	Nation	Body weight	1	2	3	Result	1	2	3	Result	1	2	3	Result	Total
1st place, gold medalist(s)	Trofim Lomakin	Soviet Union	81.80	125	~~130~~	~~130~~	125	127.5	~~132.5~~	~~132.5~~	127.5	160	~~165~~	165	165 OR	417.5 =OR
2nd place, silver medalist(s)	Stanley Stanczyk	United States	82.40	122.5	127.5	~~130~~	127.5	122.5	~~127.5~~	127.5	127.5	155	160	~~165~~	160	415
3rd place, bronze medalist(s)	Arkady Vorobyov	Soviet Union	81.80	120	~~125~~	~~125~~	120	127.5	~~132.5~~	~~132.5~~	127.5	160	~~170~~	~~170~~	160	407.5
4	Mohammad Hassan Rahnavardi	Iran	82.35	~~120~~	~~120~~	120	120	115	122.5	~~125~~	122.5	150	155	160	160	402.5
5	Jean Debuf	France	81.65	110	115	117.5	117.5	117.5	122.5	~~125~~	122.5	150	160	~~162.5~~	160	400
6	Issy Bloomberg	South Africa	80.10	120	~~127.5~~	127.5	127.5	110	115	~~117.5~~	115	142.5	150	~~155~~	150	392.5
7	Osvaldo Forte	Argentina	82.45	107.5	112.5	~~115~~	112.5	115	~~122.5~~	~~122.5~~	115	145	150	155	155	382.5
8	Clyde Emrich	United States	79.70	115	~~120~~	120	120	115	—	—	115	145	~~152.5~~	—	145	380
9	Mohamed Ali Abdel Kerim	Egypt	80.45	100	105	~~110~~	105	~~115~~	115	122.5	122.5	150	~~155~~	~~155~~	150	377.5
10	Georges Firmin	France	80.50	~~110~~	110	115	115	110	115	~~117.5~~	115	140	145	147.5	147.5	377.5
11	Hans Claussen	Germany	82.50	97.5	102.5	~~105~~	102.5	107.5	115	~~117.5~~	115	137.5	~~145~~	145	145	362.5
12	Armando Rueda	Mexico	80.95	115	~~120~~	~~120~~	115	102.5	107.5	~~110~~	107.5	132.5	~~137.5~~	137.5	137.5	360
13	Augusto Fiorentini	Italy	82.40	105	~~110~~	~~110~~	105	105	110	~~115~~	110	140	145	~~150~~	145	360
14	Wilhelm Flenner	Austria	82.45	100	~~105~~	~~105~~	100	110	~~115~~	~~115~~	110	~~142.5~~	142.5	~~150~~	142.5	352.5
15	Josef Hantych	Czechoslovakia	81.80	87.5	92.5	95	95	105	~~110~~	110	110	135	140	~~145~~	140	345
16	Silvino Robin	Brazil	82.50	102.5	~~107.5~~	107.5	107.5	100	~~105~~	~~105~~	100	132.5	137.5	~~140~~	137.5	345
17	Cecil Moore	Guyana	82.30	95	100	~~102.5~~	100	97.5	102.5	107.5	107.5	127.5	135	~~142.5~~	135	342.5
18	Ilie Dancea	Romania	82.45	90	95	~~97.5~~	95	~~102.5~~	102.5	~~107.5~~	102.5	127.5	~~132.5~~	132.5	132.5	330
19	Czesław Białas	Poland	82.20	87.5	~~92.5~~	~~92.5~~	87.5	~~102.5~~	102.5	107.5	107.5	125	130	~~135~~	130	325
20	Jack Varaleau	Canada	80.40	105	~~112.5~~	~~112.5~~	105	~~107.5~~	107.5	—	107.5	—	—	—	—	212.5
21	Orlando Garrido	Cuba	81.70	122.5	~~130~~	~~130~~	122.5	~~115~~	~~115~~	~~115~~	—	—	—	—	—	122.5
22	Sigvard Kinnunen	Sweden	80.95	110	112.5	—	112.5	~~110~~	~~110~~	~~110~~	—	—	—	—	—	112.5
23	Juhani Vellamo	Finland	—	—	—	—	—	—	—	—	—	—	—	—	—	—

== New records ==
Clean & Jerk	165 kg	Trofim Lomakin (URS)	OR
Total	417.5 kg	Trofim Lomakin (URS)	=OR
