= Lebanon at the 1955 Mediterranean Games =

- IOC code: LIB
- NOC: Lebanese Olympic Committee

in Barcelona, Spain
- Medals Ranked 7th: Gold 1 Silver 1 Bronze 4 Total 6

Mediterranean Games appearances (overview)
- 1951; 1955; 1959; 1963; 1967; 1971; 1975; 1979; 1983; 1987; 1991; 1993; 1997; 2001; 2005; 2009; 2013; 2018; 2022

34 male athletes (48 in 1951) represented Lebanon at the second Mediterranean games, held in Barcelona-Spain from July 16 to 25, 1955. It won 1 gold, 1 silver and 4 bronze medals.

In these games, Lebanon got his first gold medal thanks to Moustafa Laham, although the total medal count decreased from 19 to 6. Lifting 380 kg, Moustafa Laham improved on his 362.5 kg silver performance of 1951. Salim Moussa's 262.5 kg lift, although better than his 247.5 kg in 1951, only got him a second bronze. In wrestling, Zakaria Chehab got a silver medal after a bronze in 1951, while Elie Naasan got a second bronze.

No boxing or shooting medals were won by Lebanon this time (5 in 1951), and no free wrestling competitions were held at these games (4 medals for Lebanon in 1951).

== Medal table ==
* Host nation (Lebanon)

Rank	Nation	Gold	Silver	Bronze	Total
1	France	39	29	31	99
2	Italy	32	27	22	81
3	Spain	12	15	18	45
4	Egypt	9	20	17	46
5	Turkey	8	3	3	14
6	Greece	1	7	8	16
7	Lebanon*	1	1	4	6
8	Syria	0	0	1	1
Totals (8 entries)		102	102	104	308

== Lebanese medals by sport ==
Sport	Gold	Silver	Bronze	Total
Weightlifting	1	0	2	3
Wrestling	0	1	2	3
Totals (2 entries)	1	1	4	6

== Lebanese medal winners ==
Event	Gold	Silver	Bronze
WEIGHTLIFTING (– 75 kg)	Moustafa Laham 380 Kg (LIB)	Ismail Ragab 372.5 Kg (EGY)	Ermanno Pignatti 355 Kg (ITA)
Weightlifting (– 56 kg)	Kamal Mahgoub 297.5 Kg (EGY)	Marc Marcombe 280 Kg (FRA)	Salim Moussa 262.5 Kg (LIB)
Weightlifting (– 60 kg)	Sebastiano Mannironi 330 Kg (FRA)	Ali Mahgoub 317.5 Kg (EGY)	Haroutioun Djoubanian 302.5 Kg (LIB)
WRESTLING (– Greco-Roman 57 kg)	Mustafa Dagistanli (TUR)	Zakaria Chehab (LIB)	Ibrahim Ahmed Abdel Latif (EGY)
Wrestling (– Greco-Roman 52 kg)	Ahmet Bilek (TUR)	Sayed Osman (EGY)	Ahmad Nahle (LIB)
Wrestling (– Greco-Roman 62 kg)	Riza Dogan (TUR)	Umberto Trippa (ITA)	Elie Naasan (LIB)

== Medalists ==
Medal	Name	Sport	Event
Gold	Moustafa Laham	Weightlifting	75 kg
Silver	Zakaria Chihab	Wrestling	Free 57 kg
Bronze	Salim Moussa	Weightlifting	56 kg
Bronze	Haroutioun Djoubanian	Weightlifting	60 kg
Bronze	Ahmad Nahle	Wrestling	GrecoRoman 52 kg
Bronze	Elie Naasan	Wrestling	GrecoRoman 62 kg
