= Lebanon at the 2018 Mediterranean Games =

- IOC code: LBN

Mediterranean Games appearances (overview)
- 1951; 1955; 1959; 1963; 1967; 1971; 1975; 1979; 1983; 1987; 1991; 1993; 1997; 2001; 2005; 2009; 2013; 2018; 2022

Lebanon competed at the 2018 Mediterranean Games in Tarragona, Spain from 22 June to 1 July 2018.

== Medals ==
Medals by sport
Sport	1st place, gold medalist(s)	2nd place, silver medalist(s)	3rd place, bronze medalist(s)	Total	Rank
Weightlifting	0	1	0	1	10

== Weightlifting ==
Mahassen Hala Fattouh won the silver medal in the women's 63 kg Clean & Jerk event.
