= Lebanon at the 2022 Mediterranean Games =

Mediterranean Games edition

- IOC code: LBN
- NOC: Lebanese Olympic Committee
- Competitors: 38
- Medals: Gold 0 Silver 0 Bronze 0 Total 0

Mediterranean Games appearances (overview)
- 1951; 1955; 1959; 1963; 1967; 1971; 1975; 1979; 1983; 1987; 1991; 1993; 1997; 2001; 2005; 2009; 2013; 2018; 2022

Lebanon competed at the 2022 Mediterranean Games in Oran, Algeria from 25 June to 6 July 2022.

== Archery ==
Lebanon competed in archery.

Men

Athlete	Event	Ranking round		Round of 24	Round of 16	Quarterfinals	Semifinals	Final / BM	
Athlete	Event	Score	Seed	Opposition Score	Opposition Score	Opposition Score	Opposition Score	Opposition Score	Rank
Jacques El Rayes	Men's individual	501	35	Aly (EGY); L 0-6	Did not advance				25

== Boxing ==
Lebanon participated in boxing.

Men

Athlete	Event	Round of 16	Quarterfinals	Semifinals	Final	
Athlete	Event	Opposition Result	Opposition Result	Opposition Result	Opposition Result	Rank
Ali Hashem	Middleweight (75 kg)	Memić (SRB); L RSC	Did not advance			

Women

Athlete	Event	Round of 16	Quarterfinals	Semifinals	Final	
Athlete	Event	Opposition Result	Opposition Result	Opposition Result	Opposition Result	Rank
Zeinab Khatoun	Bantamweight (54 kg)	Ayyad (EGY); L RSC	Did not advance			

== Fencing ==
Lebanon participated in fencing.

Men

Athlete	Event	Group stage						Round of 16	Quarterfinal	Semifinal	Final / BM	
Athlete	Event	Opposition Score	Opposition Score	Opposition Score	Opposition Score	Opposition Score	Rank	Opposition Score	Opposition Score	Opposition Score	Opposition Score	Rank
Antoine El Choueiri	Individual épée	Tagliariol (ITA); L 5–2	Jérent (FRA); L 5–3	Elkord (MAR); L 5–2	Elsokkary (EGY); L 5–2	Eljibali (LBA); W 5–0	5	Did not advance				

Women

Athlete	Event	Group stage						Round of 16	Quarterfinal	Semifinal	Final / BM	
Athlete	Event	Opposition Score	Opposition Score	Opposition Score	Opposition Score	Opposition Score	Rank	Opposition Score	Opposition Score	Opposition Score	Opposition Score	Rank
Rita Abou Jaoude	Individual épée	Marzani (ITA); L 4–2	Vanryssel (FRA); L 5–1	Gunac (TUR); L 5–1	Gueham (ALG); W 2–1	Damjanoska (MKD); W 5–4	4 Q	Louis-Marie (FRA); L 15–5	Did not advance			
Rita Abou Jaoude	Individual foil	Bye						Batini (ITA); L 15–6	Did not advance			

== Judo ==
Lebanon participated in judo.

Men

Athlete	Event	Round of 16	Quarterfinals	Semifinals	Repechage 1	Repechage 2	Final / BM	
Athlete	Event	Opposition Result	Opposition Result	Opposition Result	Opposition Result	Opposition Result	Opposition Result	Rank
Ghady Moussa	Men's 73 kg	Hojak (SLO); L (0-0)	Did not advance					
Caramnob Sagaipov	Men's 90 kg	Chakarovski (MKD); L (0-10)	Did not advance					

Women

Athlete	Event	Round of 16	Quarterfinals	Semifinals	Repechage 1	Repechage 2	Final / BM	
Athlete	Event	Opposition Result	Opposition Result	Opposition Result	Opposition Result	Opposition Result	Opposition Result	Rank
Natasha Tarabay	Women's 78 kg	Pavić (CRO); L (0-0)	Did not advance					

== Sailing ==
Lebanon participated in sailing.

Men

Athlete	Event	Race									Net points	Final rank
Athlete	Event	1	2	3	4	5	6	7	8	9	Net points	Final rank
Motaz Elhadek	Laser	DNF 29	DNF 29	25	25	25	24	23	25	(29) DNC	234	205

== Weightlifting ==
Lebanon participated in weightlifting.

Women

Athlete	Event	Snatch		Clean & Jerk	
Athlete	Event	Result	Rank	Result	Rank
Mahassen Fattouh	71 kg	88	8	110	10
Andreana El Ton	71 kg	85	11	—	
