= Lebanon at the 2013 Mediterranean Games =

- IOC code: LIB
- NOC: Lebanese Olympic Committee

in Mersin
- Medals Ranked th: Gold 0 Silver 0 Bronze 1 Total 1

Mediterranean Games appearances (overview)
- 1951; 1955; 1959; 1963; 1967; 1971; 1975; 1979; 1983; 1987; 1991; 1993; 1997; 2001; 2005; 2009; 2013; 2018; 2022

Lebanon competed at the 2013 Mediterranean Games in Mersin, Turkey from the 20th to 30 June 2013.

== Archery ==
Men

Athlete	Event	Ranking round		Round of 64	Round of 32	Round of 16	Quarterfinals	Semifinals	Final / BM	
Athlete	Event	Score	Seed	Opposition Score	Opposition Score	Opposition Score	Opposition Score	Opposition Score	Opposition Score	Rank
Jacques El Rayess	Individual	560	34	Jonkić (SRB); L 4-6	Did not advance					
Jihad Toukan	Individual	457	40	Arebi (LBA); L 0–6	Did not advance					

== Badminton ==
Athlete	Event	Group stage				Quarterfinal	Semifinal	Final / BM	
Athlete	Event	Opposition Score	Opposition Score	Opposition Score	Rank	Opposition Score	Opposition Score	Opposition Score	Rank
Jalal Abou Alwan	Men's singles	Lo Ying Ping (FRA); L 6–21, 3–21	Velazquez (ESP); L 3–21, 3–21						
Tony Choueiry	Men's singles	Hölbling (CRO); L 6–21, 10–21	Abian (ESP); L 5–21, 3–21						
Tony Choueiry; Jalal Abou Alwan	Men's doubles	Đurkinjak / Hölbling (CRO); L 5-21, 5–21							

== Boxing ==
Men

Athlete	Event	Round of 16	Quarterfinals	Semifinals	Final	
Athlete	Event	Opposition Result	Opposition Result	Opposition Result	Opposition Result	Rank
Najid Salloum	Lightweight	BYE	Ouadahi (ALG); L 0–3	Did not advance		
Khodor Antar	Light welterweight	Keles (TUR); L 0–3	Did not advance			
Ahmad Al Nabouche	Welterweight	—N/a	Sissocko (ESP); L 0–3	Did not advance		
Najid Salloum	Middleweight	BYE	Zhuta (MKD); L 1–2	Did not advance		

== Cycling ==
Athlete	Event	Time	Rank
Ahmad Mourad	Men's road race	DNF	
Ahmad Mourad	Men's time trial	39:12.96	19
Youssef Nader	Men's road race	OTL	

== Fencing ==
Croatia will be represented by one fencer.

Men

Athlete	Event	Group stage					Round of 16	Quarterfinal	Semifinal	Final / BM	
Athlete	Event	Opposition Score	Opposition Score	Opposition Score	Opposition Score	Rank	Opposition Score	Opposition Score	Opposition Score	Opposition Score	Rank
Alessandro Michon	Individual épée	Pereira (ESP); W 5–2	Lucenay (FRA); L 4–5	Garozzo (ITA); L 1–5	Nikolić (SRB); W 4–1	3 Q	Fayez (EGY); L 13–15	Did not advance			

Women

Athlete	Event	Group stage						Round of 16	Quarterfinal	Semifinal	Final / BM	
Athlete	Event	Opposition Score	Opposition Score	Opposition Score	Opposition Score	Opposition Score	Rank	Opposition Score	Opposition Score	Opposition Score	Opposition Score	Rank
Rita Abou Jaoude	Individual épée	Navarria (ITA); W 5–2	Goram (FRA); L 3–4	Besbes (TUN); L 1–5	Paschalidou (GRE); L 2–3	Gunac (TUR); L 1–5	6 Q	Navarria (ITA); L 6–15	Did not advance			
Dominique Tannous	Individual épée	Dogan (TUR); W 5–1	Mansouri (TUN); L 4–5	Rodić (SRB); L 4–5	Fiamingo (ITA); L 1–5	—N/a	4 Q	Gunac (TUR); W 15–12	Mansouri (TUN); L 9–15	Did not advance		
Mona Shaito	Individual foil	Boubakri (TUN); W 5–4	Erba (ITA); L 2–5	Karamete (TUR); W 5–2	—N/a		2 Q	—N/a	Di Francisca (ITA); L 7–15	Did not advance		

== Gymnastics ==
=== Artistic ===
Men

Athlete	Event	Qualification								Final							
Athlete	Event	Apparatus						Total	Rank	Apparatus						Total	Rank
Athlete	Event	F	PH	R	V	PB	HB	Total	Rank	F	PH	R	V	PB	HB	Total	Rank
Hicham El Kahwaji	All-around	10.433	—N/a	10.300	10.933	—N/a		31.666	38	Did not advance							
Mohamad Ibrahim Shami	All-around	11.066	—N/a	6.466	13.800	—N/a		31.332	39	Did not advance							

== Judo ==
Athlete	Event	Round of 16	Quarterfinals	Semifinals	Repechage	Final / BM	
Athlete	Event	Opposition Result	Opposition Result	Opposition Result	Opposition Result	Opposition Result	Rank
Ziade Damien	Men's −60 kg	—N/a	Saker (ALG); L 000-100	BYE	Cullhaj (ALB); W 100–000	Elhadi Elkawisah (LBA); W 010–000	3rd place, bronze medalist(s)
Georges Merheb	Men's −90 kg	BYE	Kukolj (SRB); L 000-100	BYE	Gkaraklov (GRE); W 010–000	Benamadi (ALG); L 000–001	5
Rudy Hachache	Men's +100 kg	Elshehaby (EGY); L 000–101	Did not advance				
Caren Shammas	Women's −63 kg	Mišković (CRO); L 000–101	Did not advance				
Marie Aad	Women's −78 kg	—N/a	Yilmaz (TUR); L 000–100	BYE	Ouallal (ALG); L 000–100	Did not advance	

== Swimming ==
Men

Athlete	Event	Heat		Final	
Athlete	Event	Time	Rank	Time	Rank
Adam Allouche	100 m breaststroke	1:10.78	16	Did not advance	

Women

Athlete	Event	Heat		Final	
Athlete	Event	Time	Rank	Time	Rank
Katya Bachrouche	400 m freestyle	4:21.66	7 Q	4:22.38	6
