= Lebanon at the Mediterranean Games =

- IOC code: LBN
- NOC: Lebanese Olympic Committee
- Medals Ranked 19th: Gold 11 Silver 23 Bronze 42 Total 76

Mediterranean Games appearances (overview)
- 1951; 1955; 1959; 1963; 1967; 1971; 1975; 1979; 1983; 1987; 1991; 1993; 1997; 2001; 2005; 2009; 2013; 2018; 2022; 2026

Lebanon has competed at every edition of the quadrennial Mediterranean Games event since the inaugural edition in 1951. As of 2026, Lebanese athletes have won a total of 76 medals.

== Overview ==
=== By event ===
Games	Athletes	Gold	Silver	Bronze	Total	Rank
1951 Alexandria	48	0	5	14	19	—
1955 Barcelona	34	1	1	4	6	—
1959 Beirut	180	3	10	17	30	—
1963 Naples	54	0	0	1	1	—
1967 Tunis		0	0	1	1	—
1971 İzmir	2	0	0	0	0	—
1975 Algiers	91	3	0	1	4	—
1979 Split	13	1	1	0	2	—
1983 Casablanca	34	1	2	0	3	—
1987 Latakia	135	0	1	0	1	—
1991 Athens	22	1	1	1	3	—
1993 Languedoc-Roussillon	41	0	0	0	0	—
1997 Bari	41	0	0	0	0	—
2001 Tunis	59	0	1	1	2	—
2005 Almería	20	0	0	0	0	—
2009 Pescara	36	0	0	0	0	—
2013 Mersin		0	0	2	2	—
2018 Tarragona	21	0	1	0	1	—
2022 Oran	38	0	0	0	0	—
2026 Taranto	50	1	0	0	1	21st
Total		11	23	42	76	19

== See also ==
- Lebanon at the Olympics
- Lebanon at the Paralympics
