= Cerroni (surname) =

Cerroni is an Italian surname. Notable people with the surname include:

- Antonio Cerroni (1924–2020), Italian wrestler
- Pat Cerroni (born c. 1965), American college football coach
- Pietro de' Cerroni or Pietro Cavallini (c. 1240 – c. 1330), Italian artist active during the late Middle Ages
- Ugo Cerroni (1915–1978), Italian footballer
