= Ünal =

Ünal is a masculine given name and surname of Turkish origin. Notable people with the name include:

== Given name ==
- Ünal Alpuğan (born 1973), German-Turkish footballer
- Ünal Aysal (born 1941), Turkish businessman
- Ünal Demirkıran (born 1979), German-Turkish footballer
- Ünal Erkan (1942–2026), Turkish politician
- Ünal Karaman (born 1966), Turkish footballer
- Ünal Tosun (born 1992), German football player and coach
- Ünal Üstel (born 1955), Turkish-Cypriot politician

== Surname ==
- Ahmet Ünal (born 2002), Turkish para judoka
- Ali Ünal (born 1955), Turkish author
- Buğra Ünal (born 1997), Turkish modern pentathlete
- Buse Ünal (born 1997), Turkish volleyball player
- Daniel Ünal (born 1990), Swiss footballer
- Enes Ünal (born 1997), Turkish footballer
- Gökhan Ünal (born 1982), Turkish footballer
- Mehmet Nadir Ünal (born 1993), Turkish kickboxer and amateur boxer
- Taylan Ünal (born 1982), Turkish artist

== Places ==
- Ünal, Kulp, a neighborhood of Kulp district in Diyarbakır Province, Turkey
