= David Pimentel (disambiguation) =

David Pimentel (1927–?), Mexican weightlifter.

David Pimentel may also refer to:

- David Pimentel (scientist) (1925–2019), American professor
- David Dias Pimentel (1941–2021), Portuguese bishop
