= Weightlifting at the 1952 Summer Olympics – Men's 75 kg =

Men's 75 kg at the Games of the XV Olympiad
- Venue: Messuhalli
- Date: 26 July 1952
- Competitors: 21 from 20 nations
- Winning total: 400 kg OR

Medalists
1st place, gold medalist(s)		Pete George	United States
2nd place, silver medalist(s)		Gerry Gratton	Canada
3rd place, bronze medalist(s)		Kim Seong-jip	South Korea

The men's 75 kg weightlifting competitions at the 1952 Summer Olympics in Helsinki took place on 26 July at Messuhalli. It was the seventh appearance of the middleweight class.

Each weightlifter had three attempts at each of the three lifts. The best score for each lift was summed to give a total. The weightlifter could increase the weight between attempts (minimum of 5 kg between first and second attempts, 2.5 kg between second and third attempts) but could not decrease weight. If two or more weightlifters finished with the same total, the competitors' body weights were used as the tie-breaker (lighter athlete wins).

== Records ==
Prior to this competition, the existing world and Olympic records were as follows.

World record	Press	Khadr El-Touni (EGY)	127.5 kg		1948
World record	Snatch	J. Duganov (URS)	129.5 kg		1952
World record	Clean & Jerk	Pete George (USA)	164.5 kg		1950
World record	Total	Stanley Stanczyk (USA)	405 kg	Philadelphia, United States	26–27 September 1947
Olympic record	Press	Kim Seong-jip (KOR)	122.5 kg	London, United Kingdom	10 August 1948
Olympic record	Snatch	Pete George (USA)	122.5 kg	London, United Kingdom	10 August 1948
Olympic record	Clean & Jerk	Pete George (USA)	155 kg	London, United Kingdom	10 August 1948
Olympic record	Total	Frank Spellman (USA)	390 kg	London, United Kingdom	10 August 1948

== Results ==
Rank	Athlete	Nation	Body weight	Press (kg)				Snatch (kg)				Clean & Jerk (kg)				Total
Rank	Athlete	Nation	Body weight	1	2	3	Result	1	2	3	Result	1	2	3	Result	Total
1st place, gold medalist(s)	Pete George	United States	72.80	105	110	115	115	120	125	127.5	127.5 OR	150	157.5	~~165~~	157.5 OR	400 OR
2nd place, silver medalist(s)	Gerry Gratton	Canada	74.80	115	122.5	~~127.5~~	122.5 =OR	112.5	~~120~~	~~120~~	112.5	142.5	150	155	155	390
3rd place, bronze medalist(s)	Kim Seong-jip	South Korea	73.40	122.5	~~127.5~~	~~127.5~~	122.5 =OR	105	110	112.5	112.5	140	145	147.5	147.5	382.5
4	Ismail Ragab	Egypt	73.85	110	115	~~117.5~~	115	110	115	117.5	117.5	~~145~~	145	150	150	382.5
5	Moustafa Laham	Lebanon	73.00	107.5	112.5	115	115	112.5	~~117.5~~	~~120~~	112.5	~~142.5~~	142.5	~~150~~	142.5	370
6	Åke Hedberg	Sweden	72.70	95	100	102.5	102.5	105	~~110~~	~~110~~	105	135	145	150	150	357.5
7	Ángel Sposato	Argentina	73.85	102.5	~~107.5~~	107.5	107.5	105	110	~~112.5~~	110	135	140	~~145~~	140	357.5
8	Jalal Mansouri	Iran	74.95	~~105~~	105	110	110	107.5	~~112.5~~	~~112.5~~	107.5	135	140	~~145~~	140	357.5
9	Frank Teräskari	Finland	74.85	95	100	102.5	102.5	105	~~110~~	110	110	135	140	~~145~~	140	352.5
10	André Dochy	France	74.50	95	100	102.5	102.5	102.5	107.5	~~110~~	107.5	135	140	~~142.5~~	140	350
11	Václav Pšenička Jr.	Czechoslovakia	74.75	92.5	97.5	100	100	100	105	107.5	107.5	130	140	142.5	142.5	350
12	Jan Smeekens	Netherlands	73.70	90	95	~~100~~	95	110	115	~~120~~	115	~~135~~	135	~~145~~	135	345
13	Jørgen Moritzen	Denmark	74.15	92.5	97.5	~~100~~	97.5	97.5	102.5	105	105	132.5	137.5	~~140~~	137.5	340
14	Emmerich Bauer	Austria	73.15	95	100	~~102.5~~	100	102.5	~~110~~	~~110~~	102.5	130	135	~~140~~	135	337.5
15	Fred Giffin	Australia	75.00	107.5	~~112.5~~	~~112.5~~	107.5	95	~~100~~	100	100	122.5	127.5	~~132.5~~	127.5	335
16	Thor Olsen	Norway	74.85	95	100	~~102.5~~	100	95	100	~~102.5~~	100	120	125	~~130~~	125	325
17	Muhammad Iqbal Butt	Pakistan	75.00	95	~~100~~	—	95	95	100	~~102.5~~	100	~~130~~	130	~~135~~	130	325
18	Ilie Enciu	Romania	74.30	~~97.5~~	97.5	~~102.5~~	97.5	92.5	97.5	~~100~~	97.5	122.5	127.5	~~130~~	127.5	322.5
19	Walter Dossenbach	Switzerland	74.40	85	~~92.5~~	~~92.5~~	85	95	100	~~102.5~~	100	122.5	~~127.5~~	127.5	127.5	312.5
20	Jacques Flury	Switzerland	74.50	80	85	—	85	95	~~100~~	100	100	117.5	125	~~130~~	125	310
21	David Pimentel	Mexico	74.35	102.5	~~110~~	~~110~~	102.5	95	~~100~~	~~100~~	95	~~122.5~~	~~122.5~~	~~122.5~~	—	197.5

== New records ==
Press	122.5 kg	Gerry Gratton (CAN); Kim Seong-jip (KOR)	=OR
Snatch	127.5 kg	Pete George (USA)	OR
Clearn & Jerk	157.5 kg	Pete George (USA)	OR
Total	400 kg	Pete George (USA)	OR
