= Wrestling at the 1955 Mediterranean Games =

Wrestling competition

- Dates: 17–19 July 1955
- Competitors: 60 from 8 nations

The wrestling tournament at the 1955 Mediterranean Games was held in Barcelona, Spain.

== Medal table ==
* Host nation (Spain)

Rank	Nation	Gold	Silver	Bronze	Total
1	Turkey	6	0	1	7
2	Italy	1	4	1	6
3	France	1	1	0	2
4	Egypt	0	2	3	5
5	Lebanon	0	1	2	3
6	Greece	0	0	1	1
Totals (6 entries)		8	8	8	24

== Medalists ==
=== Men's Greco-Roman ===
Event	Gold	Silver	Bronze
52 kg	Ahmet Bilek; Turkey	Osman El-Sayed; Egypt	Ahmad Nahle; Lebanon
57 kg	Mustafa Dağıstanlı; Turkey	Zakaria Chihab; Lebanon	Ibrahim Ahmed Abdel Latif; Egypt
62 kg	Rıza Doğan; Turkey	Umberto Trippa; Italy	Elie Naasan; Lebanon
67 kg	Roger Bielle; France	Bruno Granaiola; Italy	Tevfik Yüce; Turkey
67 kg	Giuseppe Pirazzoli; Italy	Jean-Baptiste Leclerc; France	Georgios Petmezas; Greece
74 kg	Bekir Büke; Turkey	Adel Ibrahim Moustafa; Egypt	Osvaldo Riva; Italy
87 kg	Süleyman Baştimur; Turkey	Adelmo Bulgarelli; Italy	Mohamed Mahmoud El Sharkawi; Egypt
+87 kg	Hamit Kaplan; Turkey	Giuseppe Marcucci; Italy	Mohamed Amir Hilal; Egypt
