= André Dochy =

French weightlifter

Personal information
- Nationality: French
- Born: 12 March 1928; Halluin, France
- Died: 31 October 2011 (aged 83); Halluin, Departement Nord, France

Sport
- Sport: Weightlifting

André Dochy (12 March 1928 – 31 October 2011) was a French weightlifter. He competed in the men's middleweight event at the 1952 Summer Olympics.
