= Silvino Robin =

Brazilian weightlifter (1923–1991)

Personal information
- Born: 29 October 1923 Carmo, Rio de Janeiro, Brazil
- Died: 18 June 1991 (aged 67) Balneário Camboriú, Santa Catarina, Brazil

Sport
- Sport: Weightlifting

Silvino Robin (29 October 1923 – 18 June 1991) was a Brazilian weightlifter. He competed in the men's light heavyweight event at the 1952 Summer Olympics. Robin died in Balneário Camboriú on 18 June 1991, at the age of 67.
