= Jacques Flury =

Swiss weightlifter

Personal information
- Nationality: Swiss
- Born: 10 May 1932
- Died: 23 October 1965 (aged 33)

Sport
- Sport: Weightlifting

Jacques Flury (10 May 1932 – 23 October 1965) was a Swiss weightlifter. He competed in the men's middleweight event at the 1952 Summer Olympics. He died in 1965 while cycling when he was struck by a bus.
