= Åke Hedberg =

Swedish weightlifter

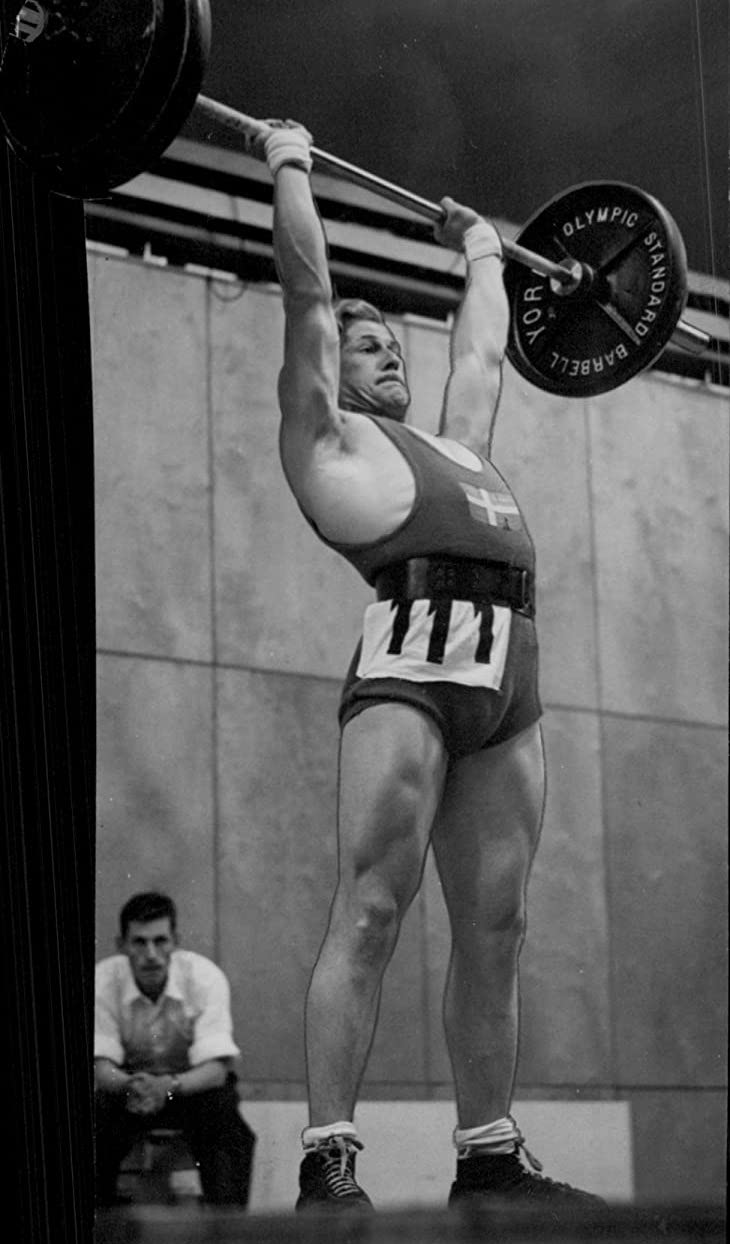

Personal information
- Nationality: Swedish
- Born: 14 December 1929 Vansbro, Sweden
- Died: 7 April 1971 (aged 41) Västerås, Sweden

Sport
- Sport: Weightlifting
- Club: Kristinehamns ABK
Medal record
Representing Sweden
European Weightlifting Championships
Gold medal – first place	1952 Helsinki	-75 kg
Silver medal – second place	1953 Stockholm	-67.5 kg

Bernt Åke Hedberg (14 December 1929 – 7 April 1971) was a Swedish weightlifter. Competing in the middleweight division in 1952 he won the European title and placed sixth at the Summer Olympics. Next year he moved to a lighter weight category and finished second at the European championships.
