= Thor Olsen (weightlifter) =

Norwegian weightlifter

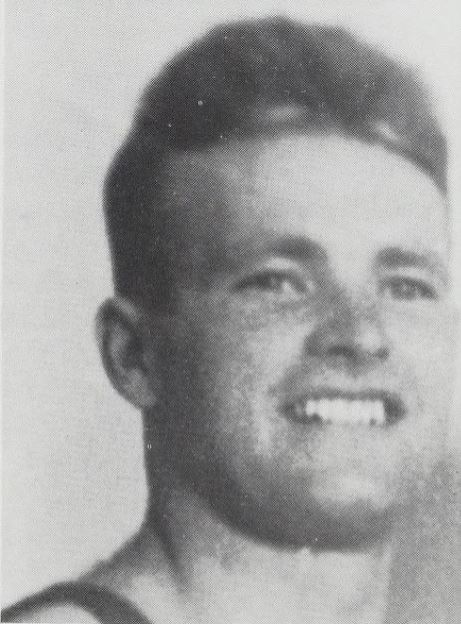
- Thor Olsen in 1951

Personal information
- Nationality: Norwegian
- Born: 1 December 1929; Trondheim, Norway
- Died: 4 June 2014 (aged 84)

Sport
- Sport: Weightlifting

Thor Olsen (1 December 1929 – 4 June 2014) was a Norwegian weightlifter. He competed in the men's middleweight event at the 1952 Summer Olympics.
