= Fred Giffin =

Australian weightlifter (1920–1999)

Personal information
- Nationality: Australian
- Born: 19 April 1920; Brisbane, Australia
- Died: 10 May 1999 (aged 79); Brisbane, Australia

Sport
- Sport: Weightlifting

Fred Giffin (19 April 1920 – 10 May 1999) was an Australian weightlifter. He competed in the men's middleweight event at the 1952 Summer Olympics.
