= Emmerich Bauer =

Austrian weightlifter (1927–2020)

Personal information
- Nationality: Austrian
- Born: 24 April 1927
- Died: 17 December 2020 (aged 93)

Sport
- Sport: Weightlifting

Emmerich Bauer (24 October 1927 – 17 December 2020) was an Austrian weightlifter. He competed in the men's middleweight event at the 1952 Summer Olympics.
