= Hans Claussen =

German weightlifter

Personal information
- Nationality: German
- Born: 5 September 1911; Lübeck, Germany
- Died: 21 July 2001 (aged 89); Lauenburg, Germany

Sport
- Sport: Weightlifting

Hans Claussen (5 September 1911 – 21 July 2001) was a German weightlifter. He competed in the men's light heavyweight event at the 1952 Summer Olympics.
