= Juho Kinnunen =

Juho Kinnunen can refer to:

- Juho Kinnunen (politician) (1865-1934), Finnish clergyman and politician
- Juho Kinnunen (wrestler) (1909-1972), Finnish Olympic wrestler
