= Ilie Dancea =

Romanian weightlifter

Personal information
- Nationality: Romanian
- Born: 25 July 1928

Sport
- Sport: Weightlifting

Ilie Dancea (born 25 July 1928) was a Romanian weightlifter. He competed in the men's light heavyweight event at the 1952 Summer Olympics.
