= Ilie Enciu =

Romanian weightlifter

Personal information
- Nationality: Romanian
- Born: 24 December 1924; Bucharest, Romania

Sport
- Sport: Weightlifting

Ilie Enciu (born 24 December 1924) was a Romanian weightlifter. He competed in the men's middleweight event at the 1952 Summer Olympics.
