= Walter Dossenbach =

Swiss weightlifter

Personal information
- Nationality: Swiss
- Born: 6 March 1922 near Tilsit, Germany
- Died: 26 January 1999 (aged 76); Zürich, Switzerland

Sport
- Sport: Weightlifting

Walter Dossenbach (6 March 1922 – 26 January 1999) was a Swiss weightlifter. He competed in the men's middleweight event at the 1952 Summer Olympics.
