= Wilhelm Flenner =

Austrian weightlifter

Personal information
- Nationality: Austrian
- Born: 10 November 1922
- Died: February 1995

Sport
- Sport: Weightlifting

Wilhelm Flenner (10 November 1922 – February 1995) was an Austrian weightlifter. He competed in the men's light heavyweight event at the 1952 Summer Olympics.
