= Toivo Kinnunen =

Finnish politician

Toivo Henrik Kinnunen (9 November 1905 in Pieksämäen maalaiskunta – 13 February 1977) was a Finnish farmer and politician. He was a member of the Parliament of Finland from 1945 to 1958 and again from 1962 to 1966, representing the Agrarian League (which changed its name to Centre Party in 1965).
