= Kim Sung-jip =

South Korean weightlifter (1919–2016)

- Hangul: 김성집
- Hanja: 金晟集
- RR: Gim Seongjip
- MR: Kim Sŏngjip

Kim Sung-jip
Medal record

Men's weightlifting

Representing South Korea

Olympic Games
| Bronze medal – third place | 1948 London | Middleweight |
| Bronze medal – third place | 1952 Helsinki | Middleweight |

World Championships
| Bronze medal – third place | 1947 Philadelphia | Middleweight |

Asian Games
| Gold medal – first place | 1954 Manila | Light heavyweight |

Kim Sung-jip (13 January 1919 – 20 February 2016) was a weightlifter from South Korea. He competed for South Korea in the 1948 Summer Olympics held in London in the flyweight event where he finished in third place. Also, he competed for South Korea in the 1952 Summer Olympics, 1956 Summer Olympics where he finished in third and fifth respectively. Kim was the first person to have won the same medal at two successive Summer Olympics for South Korea.
