= Wrestling at the 1963 Mediterranean Games =

Wrestling competition

- Dates: 23–25 September 1963 (Greco-Roman events); 26–28 September 1963 (Freestyle events)

The wrestling tournament at the 1963 Mediterranean Games was held in Naples, Italy.

== Medal table ==
* Host nation (Italy)

Rank	Nation	Gold	Silver	Bronze	Total
1	Turkey	10	2	1	13
2	Italy	2	4	4	10
3	Yugoslavia	2	0	1	3
4	Egypt	1	7	3	11
5	France	1	2	0	3
6	Syria	0	1	2	3
7	Greece	0	0	4	4
8	Lebanon	0	0	1	1
Totals (8 entries)		16	16	16	48

== Medalists ==
=== Men's freestyle ===
- Note 1: Official report mistakenly lists Zardoni (ITA) as winning bronze in Lightweight category, contemporary reports attribute bronze medal to Constantino Kozanidis (GRE).
- Note 2: Egypt competed as United Arab Republic (UAR) even though Syria had seceded from the UAR and sent its own team to the 1963 Games. For this reason, UAR results from 1963 are retroactively attributed to Egypt.

Event	Gold	Silver	Bronze
52 kg	Vincenzo Grassi; Italy	André Zoéte; France	Mehmet Kartal; Turkey
57 kg	Bekir Aydın; Turkey	Ibrahim Ahmed Abdelatif; Egypt	Luigi Chinazzo; Italy
63 kg	Georges Ballery; France	Andrea D'Amico; Italy	Muhammad Marzuk; Egypt
70 kg	Mahmut Atalay; Turkey	Ibrahim Mustafa; Egypt	Stefanos Ioannidis; Greece
78 kg	Fahrettin Çankaya; Turkey	René Schiermeyer; France	Constadios Kozanidis; Greece
87 kg	Hasan Güngör; Turkey	Mohamed Gamal El Eidaross; Egypt	Alberto Carini; Italy
97 kg	Ahmet Ayık; Turkey	Ahmad Hamid Jusuf; Egypt	Marco Borini; Italy
+97 kg	Hamit Kaplan; Turkey	Talat as-Sajjid; Egypt	Mohamed Noueiri; Lebanon

=== Greco-Roman ===
Event	Gold	Silver	Bronze
52 kg	Fouad Ali; Egypt	Ignazio Fabra; Italy	Ahmed Chahrour; Syria
57 kg	Ünver Beşergil; Turkey	Michele Toma; Italy	Ibrahim Ahmed Abdelatif; Egypt
63 kg	Metin Alakoç; Turkey	Moustafa Hamid Mansour; Egypt	Nikolaos Lazarou; Greece
70 kg	Branko Martinović; Yugoslavia	Mahmoud Ibrahim; Egypt	Salah El-Din; Syria
78 kg	Yavuz Selekman; Turkey	Mahmoud Balah; Syria	Dimitrios Savvas; Greece
87 kg	Petar Cucić; Yugoslavia	Mehmet Necdet Uçar; Turkey	Angelo Foschini; Italy
97 kg	Adelmo Bulgarelli; Italy	Gıyasettin Yılmaz; Turkey	Borislav Pavićević; Yugoslavia
+97 kg	Bekir Aksu; Turkey	Giuseppe Marcucci; Italy	Talat as-Sajjid; Egypt
