= Sigurd Iversen =

Danish footballer

Personal information
- Date of birth: 13 March 1926
- Date of death: 27 June 2004 (aged 78)

International career
Years	Team	Apps	(Gls)
1947	Denmark	3	(0)

Sigurd Iversen (13 March 1926 – 27 June 2004) was a Danish footballer. He played in three matches for the Denmark national football team in 1947.
