= David Pimentel =

Mexican weightlifter

Personal information
- Full name: David Pimentel McConish
- Born: 2 December 1927; Veracruz, Mexico

Sport
- Sport: Weightlifting

David Pimentel (born 2 December 1927) was a Mexican weightlifter. He competed in the men's middleweight event at the 1952 Summer Olympics.
