= Paul Norman (scientist) =

Paul Norman (September 1951 – 27 June 2004) was a British scientist who served as Chief Scientist for Detection and Protection at the Ministry of Defence's laboratory at Porton Down, Wiltshire. He was elected as a Fellow of the Royal Society of Chemistry in 1997. Norman was considered a pioneer against the use of biological weapons and chemical weapons.

Norman was an experienced parachutist, having completed over 1200 dives, and was a parachute instructor. He died on 27 June 2004 when the light aircraft he was piloting crashed in Devon. Two others died on the scene of the accident, one other member of the party died later in hospital. His death was declared accidental in August 2007.
