= Jacques Rossi =

Polish-French writer and polyglot (1909-2004)

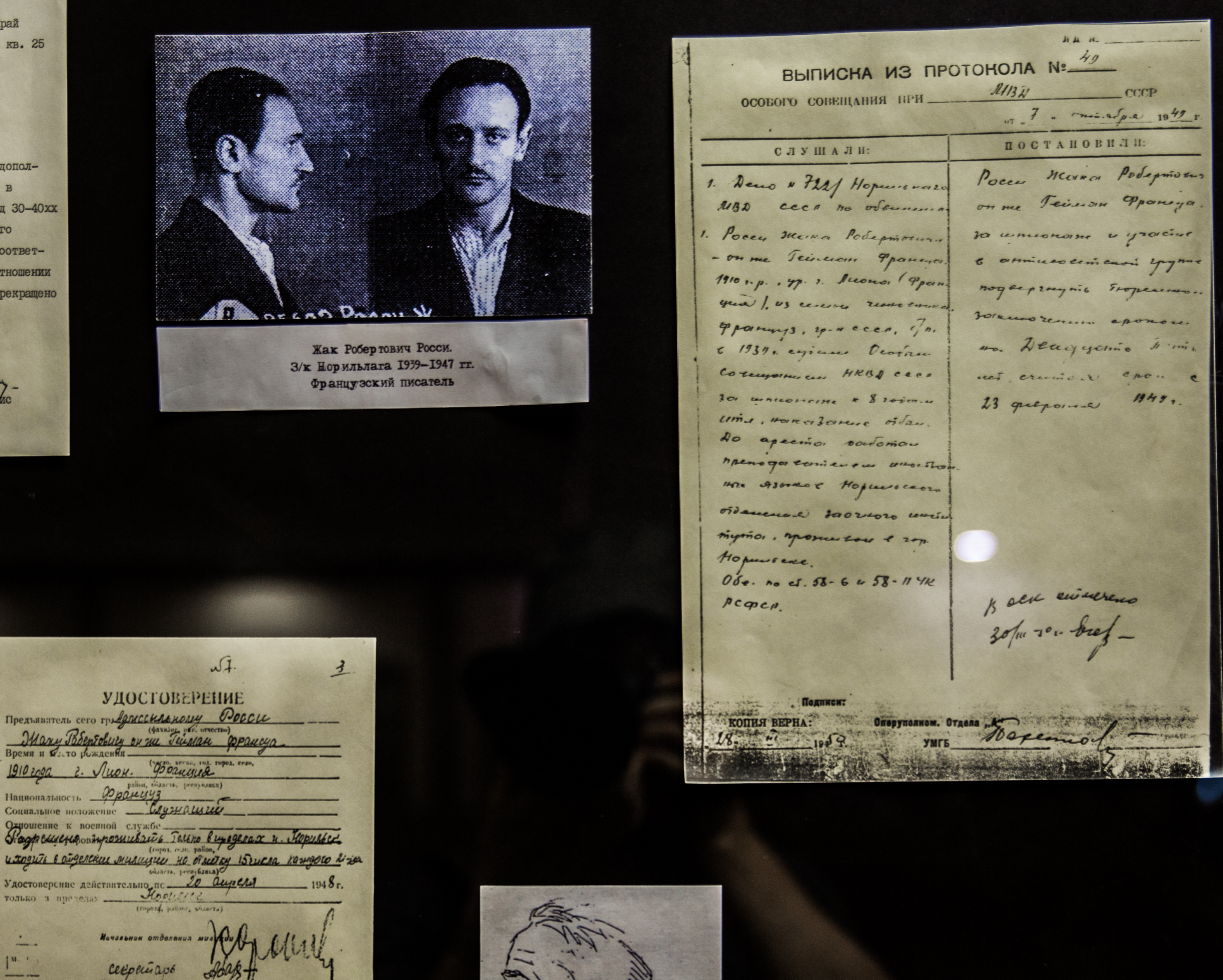
Jacques Rossi

Jacques Rossi (10 October 1909, Wrocław – 30 June 2004, Paris) was a Polish-French writer and polyglot. Rossi was best known for his books on the Gulag.

== Early life ==
He was born as Franz Xaver Heyman and was the son of architect Martin (Marcin) Heyman and Léontine Charlotte Goyet who was for a time governess in Kalisz. In 1962, in Poland, he changed his name from Franciszek Ksawiery Heyman to Jacek Franciszek Rossi, perhaps in recognition of his real father's name.

== Political associations ==
He was a member of the Communist Party of Poland as well as of the comintern. He participated in the Spanish Civil War. At one time, he worked for Leon Trotsky and interpreted for Stalin. In 1937, he was called to Moscow and, most likely due to his prior connection with Trotsky, was imprisoned in Soviet camps until after Stalin's death in 1953. In 1961 he returned to Warsaw with the help of his brother Piotr Heyman.

== Career ==
A polyglot, he was a lecturer in the University of Warsaw School of Foreign Languages under the name Jacek Rossi. He lived in Warsaw till about 1980. In 1985 he traveled to France and was naturalized as a French citizen. In the late 1980s, he spent time as a visiting scholar at Georgetown University in Washington D.C. where he wrote his memoires and an "encyclopedia on the Gulag" as he referred to it in conversation.

== Publications ==
As Jacques Rossi he wrote about his experiences of the Gulag - The Gulag Handbook, which was originally written in Russian and was translated into French (1997), English (1987), Japanese (1996), Czech (1999), Italian (2006).

At the end of his life he recorded a series of interviews which were subsequently published as Jacques, le Français : pour mémoire du Goulag.

== Bibliography ==
- Rossi, Jacques (Rossi, Jacek), Tableaux chronologiques et bref lexiqe d'historie de France. P. 2, Bref lexique et tableaux chronologiques d'historie de France / Jacek Rossi; 1973, Uniwersytet Warszawski. Wydział Filologii Obcych, ISBN 0-903868-97-0.
- Rossi Jacek, La France et les activités des ses habitants vues par les auteurs français. Warszawa 1968 s. 231. Uniwersytet Warszawski, Wyższe Studium Językowe.
- Jacques Rossi, The Gulag handbook: an encyclopedia dictionary of Soviet penitentiary institutions and terms related to the forced labor camps, New York, Paragon House, 1989, ISBN 1-55778-024-2
- Jacques Rossi and Sophie Benech, Qu'elle était belle cette utopie: chroniques du Goulag, illustrées par l'auteur, Paris: Cherche Midi, 2000, 234 strony, ISBN 2-86274-777-7, ISBN 978-2-86274-777-4
- Jacques Rossi and Michèle Sarde, Jacques, le Français : pour mémoire du Goulag, Paris, Cherche midi, 2002. ISBN 2-86274-939-7, ISBN 978-2-86274-939-6
- Jacek Rossi, Les Controverses continuent autour de la Revolution francaise, Mówią Wieki, Warszawa, marzec 1972, str. 19-24.
- Jacek Rossi, Controverses autour de la Commune de Paris, Mówią Wieki, grudzień 1974, Warszawa, str. 6-11.

== Biographies ==
- Pike, D. W. David Rousset and Jacques Rossi Two important onlookers on the European stage of 1936-1937, Guerres Mondiales et Conflits Contemporains, (190): 143-146, czerwiec 1998.
- Kauffer R., Rossi J., Twenty-five years in the gulag: Interview with Jacques Rossi, Historia (614): 84-84, luty 1998.
- Chauvin, J. R. i Rossi, J., Interview with Rossi, Jacques on his 24 years in the Gulag, Qunizane Litteraire, (611): 23-25, listopad 1 1992.
