= Antonio Schenatti =

Italian cross-country skier

Personal information
- Nationality: Italian
- Born: 3 May 1935; Sondrio, Italy
- Died: 18 June 2004 (aged 69)

Sport
- Sport: Cross-country skiing

Antonio Schenatti (3 May 1935 – 18 June 2004) was an Italian cross-country skier. He competed in the men's 50 kilometre event at the 1960 Winter Olympics.
