= Gerry Gratton =

Canadian weightlifter

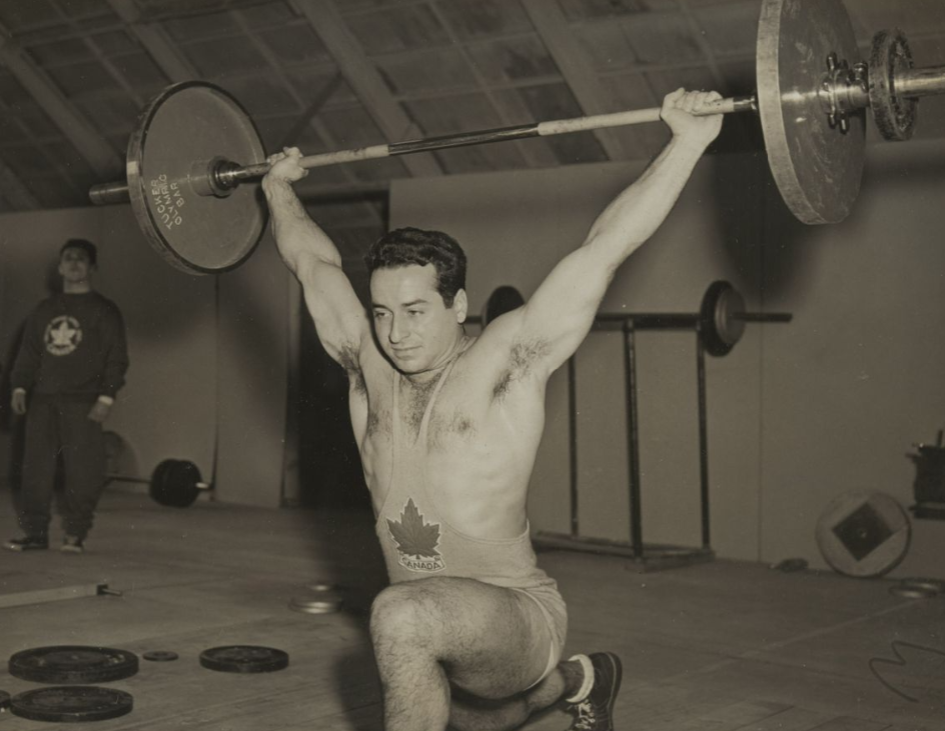
- Grafton winning gold in 1950; Auckland Libraries Heritage Collections

Personal information
- Born: August 29, 1927 Montreal, Quebec, Canada
- Died: July 28, 1963 (aged 35) Montreal, Quebec, Canada
- Weight: 165 lb (75 kg)

Sport
- Country: Canada
- Sport: Weightlifting
- Weight class: Middleweight; Light heavyweight
Medal record
Men's weightlifting
Representing Canada
Olympic Games
Silver medal – second place	1952 Helsinki	Middleweight
British Empire Games and British Empire and Commonwealth Games
Gold medal – first place	1950 Auckland	Middleweight
Gold medal – first place	1954 Vancouver	Light Heavyweight

Joseph Aimé Gerald Gratton (August 29, 1927 – July 28, 1963) was a Canadian Olympic weightlifting medallist. He won a gold medal at the 1950 British Empire Games alongside a silver at the 1952 Summer Olympics and a gold at the 1954 British Empire and Commonwealth Games. Gratton was inducted to the Canadian Olympic Hall of Fame in 1955 and Canada's Sports Hall of Fame in 2015.

== Early life and education ==
Gerry Gratton was born on August 29, 1927, in Montreal.

== Career ==
Gratton started his weightlifting career at the 1948 Summer Olympics where he came in fifth. At the 1950 British Empire Games, he won a gold medal in the middleweight event. Gratton followed up with a subsequent gold medal at the 1952 Summer Olympics, but he was demoted to the silver medal after an official ruling. After the Olympics, Gratton won a gold at the 1954 British Empire and Commonwealth Games in the middleweight category. Gratton was scheduled to compete at the 1956 Summer Olympics, but he was disqualified due to surpassing the weight limit. Gratton's final competition before his retirement was at the 1958 British Empire and Commonwealth Games.

Throughout his career, Gratton set weightlifting records including sharing the middle weight Olympic record at the 1952 Olympics. He was also the flag bearer for the Canadian team at the 1954 British Empire and Commonwealth Games.

== Awards and honours ==
In 1955, Gratton was inducted into the Canadian Olympic Hall of Fame. Posthumously, he was inducted into Canada's Sports Hall of Fame in 2015.

== Death ==
Gratton died on July 28, 1963, after succumbing to injuries from a car accident.
