= Ismail Ragab =

Egyptian weightlifter

Personal information
- Nationality: Egyptian
- Born: 21 June 1921

Sport
- Sport: Weightlifting

Ismail Ragab (born 21 June 1921, date of death unknown) was an Egyptian weightlifter. He competed in the men's middleweight event at the 1952 Summer Olympics.
