= Moustafa Laham =

Lebanese weightlifter (born 1929)

Personal information
- Full name: Moustafa S. Al-Laham
- Nationality: Lebanese
- Born: 21 October 1929
- Died: 21 August 2014 (aged 84)

Sport
- Sport: Weightlifting

Moustafa S. Al-Laham (Arabic: مصطفى اللحام; 21 October 1929 – 21 August 2014) was a Lebanese weightlifter. He competed in the men's middleweight event at the 1952 Summer Olympics.

Prior to the Olympics, he represented Lebanon in the 75 kilogram weightlifting division at the 1951 Mediterranean Games in Alexandria, where he won a silver medal after lifting 362.5 kilograms. He improved upon this performance at the 1955 Mediterranean Games in Barcelona, lifting 380 kilograms in the 75 kilogram division en route to a gold medal, Lebanon's first in a Mediterranean Games.
