= Juho Kinnunen (politician) =

Finnish politician

Juho Kinnunen (14 January 1865 in Rääkkylä – 9 September 1934) was a Finnish Lutheran clergyman and politician. He was a member of the Parliament of Finland from 1924 to 1927, representing the National Coalition Party.
