= Frank Teräskari =

Finnish weightlifter

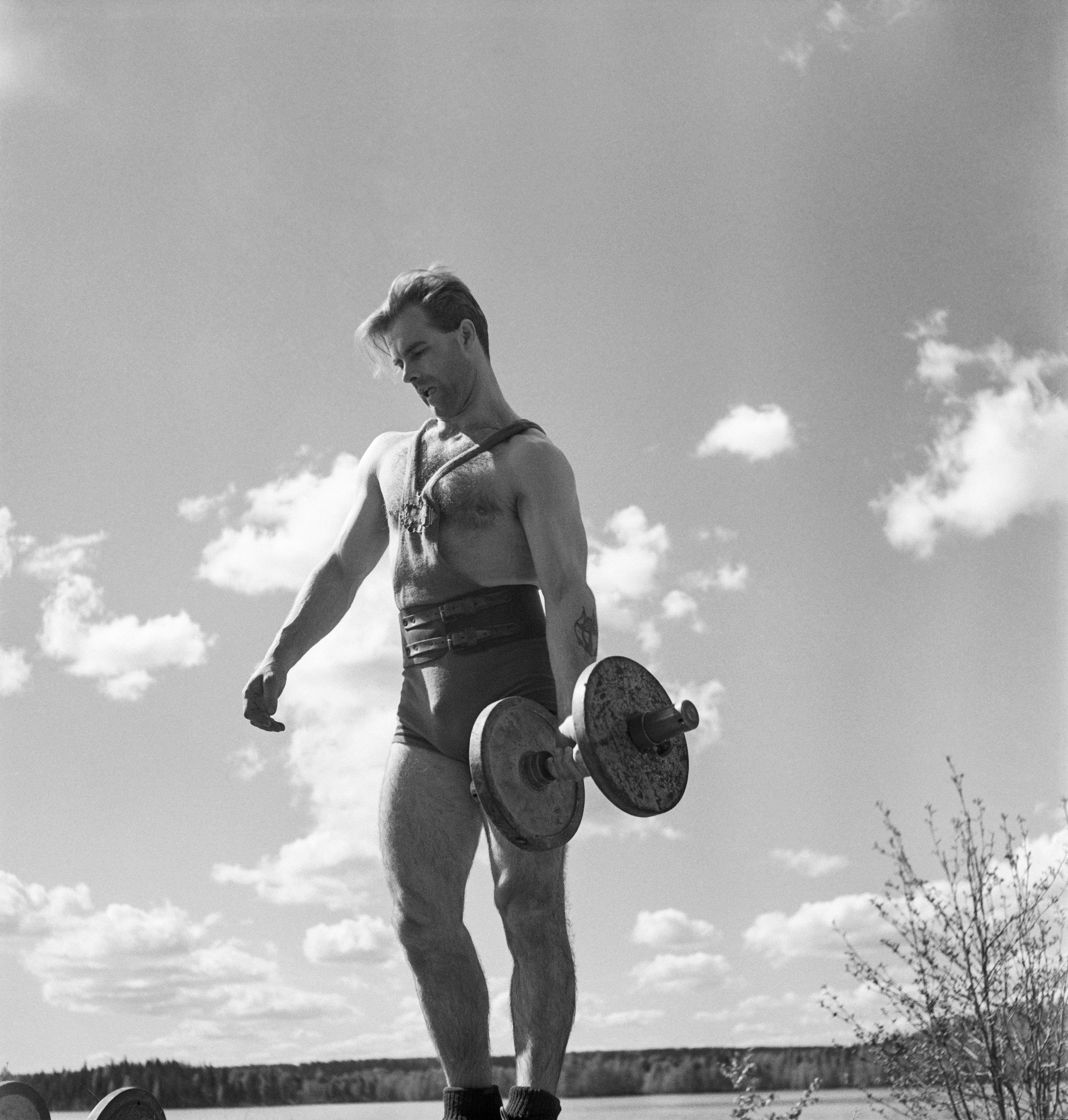
- Teräskari in 1952

Personal information
- Full name: Frank Fridolf Kullervo Teräskari
- Nationality: Finnish
- Born: 17 July 1921 Helsinki, Finland
- Died: 26 June 2004 (aged 82) Pori, Finland

Sport
- Sport: Weightlifting
Medal record
Men's weightlifting
Representing Finland
European Championships
Silver medal – second place	1949 The Hague	Middleweight
Silver medal – second place	1952 Helsinki	Middleweight

Frank Fridolf Kullervo Teräskari (17 July 1921 – 26 June 2004) was a Finnish weightlifter. He started his international weightlifting career at the 1948 Summer Olympics, where he had competed in the men's lightweight category. There, he would place fifteenth. After the 1948 Summer Games, he would win silver at the 1949 European Weightlifting Championships.

He made his second Olympic appearance at the 1952 Summer Olympics in the men's middleweight class. There, he would place ninth. After the 1952 Summer Games, he would win silver at the 1952 European Weightlifting Championships. He later died at the age of 82 in Pori.

== Biography ==
Frank Fridolf Kullervo Teräskari was born on 17 July 1921 in Helsinki, Finland.

He would first represent the nation at the 1948 Summer Olympics in London. There, he would compete in the men's lightweight category for lifters that weighed 67.5 kilograms or less. He would compete against 21 other athletes in the competition on 10 August. There, he would lift a total of 307.5 kilograms, placing 15th. After the 1948 Summer Games, he would compete at the 1949 European Weightlifting Championships in The Hague. He would compete in the men's middleweight class and win the silver medal with a total of 332.5 kilograms.

He would then compete at the 1952 Summer Olympics in Helsinki. There, he would compete in the men's middleweight class for lifters that weighed 75 kilograms or less. He would compete against 20 other athletes in the competition on 26 July. He would lift a total of 352.5 kilograms, placing ninth. After the 1952 Summer Games, would compete at the 1952 European Weightlifting Championships, also held in Helsinki. He would place second.

Teräskari later died on 26 June 2004 in Pori at the age of 82.
