= Taylan Ünal =

Turkish artist

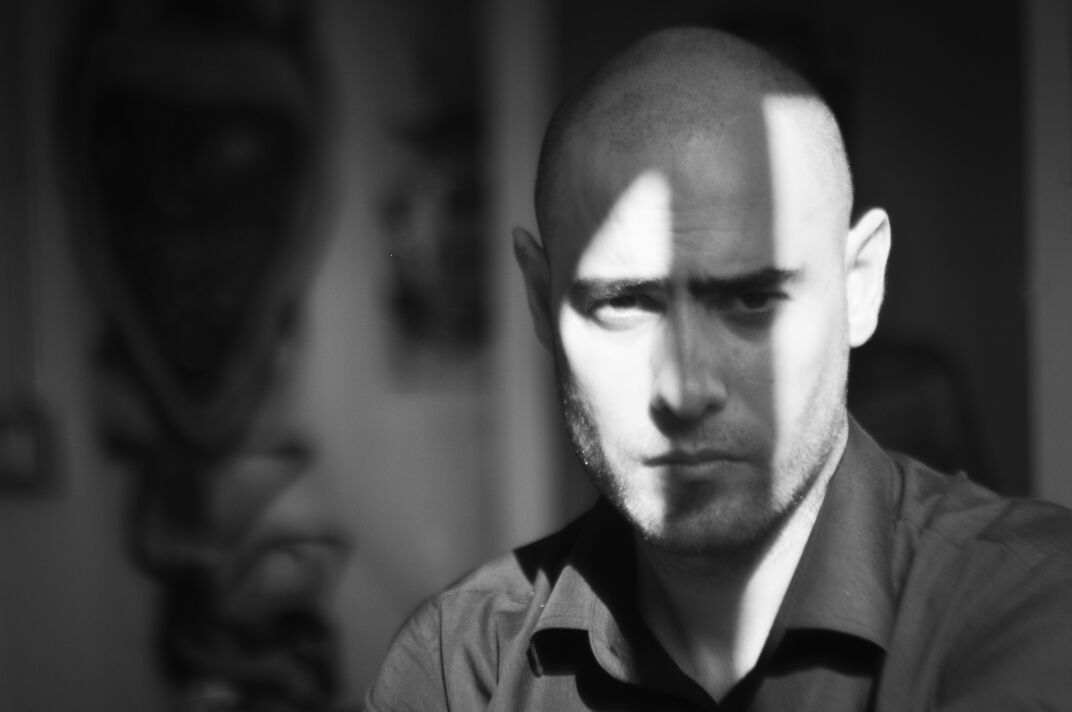
- Known for: Painting, drawing, street art
- Website: Behance profile

Taylan Ünal (born 1982) is a Turkish artist who lives in Istanbul. His work includes oil paintings, drawings and street art.

== Biography ==
Born in Istanbul, Ünal graduated from the Mimar Sinan Fine Arts University, Painting Department in 2011. He lives and works in Beyoğlu, Istanbul.

== Work ==
In his work, Ünal focuses on oil painting and drawings. Ünal uses the effect of deformation in his paintings and refers to ideas of the French philosopher Gilles Deleuze and the American artist Jackson Pollock. His work revolves around the dualism between the chaos around human beings and inside them. His portraits are often based on abstract-expressionist improvisation. Ünal seeks to understand the feeling of not belonging to anywhere, a body without organs or identity and the wish to flee. Whereas his portraits have been perceived as characters with worries, Ünal prefers an interpretation of an architectural structure with dual identities.

Ünal also worked as street artist in cities like Istanbul and Athens. In his large wall paintings, he deforms faces and expressions to give emotional asset a different language.

In 2021, Ünal has published "100faces" collection in Opensea, so that he became an NFT artist.

== Exhibitions ==
Ünal's work has been exhibited with a number of solo and group exhibitions:

2021

- Pop-up group exhibition, PG Art Gallery, Istanbul.

2020

- Pop-up group exhibition, PG Art Gallery, Istanbul.

2019

- International group exhibition for "World Art Day", Adnan Saygun Art Center, Izmir.
- Pop-up group exhibition, PG Art Gallery, Istanbul.

2018

- Group exhibition, Karaköy Kolektif, Istanbul.
- Pop-up group exhibition, PG Art Gallery, Istanbul.

2017

- Group exhibition, Karaköy Kolektif, Istanbul.

2015

- Otonorm (solo exhibition), Galeri Artist Çukurcuma, Istanbul.

2014

- 7th group exhibition, Tio Ilar International Art Exhibition, Athens.

2013

- 6th group exhibition, Tio Ilar International Art Exhibition, Athens.
- Solo exhibition, Galeri Artist Çukurcuma, Istanbul.
- 6th group exhibition, Greek consulate generale (Şişmanoğlu megaro), Istanbul.
