= Ahmet Ünal =

Turkish para judoka (born 2002)

Personal information
- Nationality: Turkish
- Born: 2002 (age 23–24)
- Home town: Çubuk, Ankara, Turkey
- Occupation: Judoka
- Years active: 2020–

Sport
- Country: Turkey
- Sport: Down Syndrome Judo
- Club: Çubuk Disabled Sports Club
- Coached by: Ahmet Koçyiğit
- Updated on 16 August 2026

Ahmet Ünal (born 2002) is a Turkish world and European champion para judoka with Down syndrome.

== Sport career ==
Ünal started with judo at the age of 18 in 2020. He is a member of Çubuk Disabked Sports Club in his hometown, where he trains supported by his mother and the club coach Ahmet Koçyiğit. He also serves as the captain of around one hundred judo trainees in the club.

As of 2026, he has been five times Turkish champion. He won gold medals at the 2023 Down Syndrome European Championships in Padova, Italy, the 2024 SUDS Olympic Games in Antalya, Turkey, and the 2025 Down Syndrome European Championships in Sweden. At the 2026 Judown World Championship in Lindesberg, Sweden, he became champion.

== Personal life ==
Born in 2002, Ahmet Ünal has Down syndrome. He lives in Çubuk District of Ankara, Turkey.
