= Luis Palomo =

Spanish sports shooter

Personal information
- Full name: Luis Palomo Puyol
- Born: 4 March 1906 Madrid, Spain

Sport
- Sport: Sports shooting

Luis Palomo (born 4 March 1906, date of death unknown) was a Spanish sports shooter. He competed at the 1948 Summer Olympics and 1960 Summer Olympics.
