= Augusto Fiorentini =

Italian weightlifter

Personal information
- Nationality: Italian
- Born: 16 June 1929 Ferrara, Italy
- Died: 10 August 2010 (aged 81) Roveré della Luna

Sport
- Sport: Weightlifting

Augusto Fiorentini (16 June 1929 – 10 August 2010) was an Italian weightlifter. He competed in the men's light heavyweight event at the 1952 Summer Olympics.
