= Dragomir Ilic =

Yugoslav footballer (1925–2004)

Personal information
- Date of birth: 16 August 1925
- Date of death: 18 June 2004 (aged 78)
- Place of death: Bremen, Germany
- Position: Goalkeeper

Youth career
- BSK

Senior career*
Years	Team	Apps	(Gls)
1948	Werder Bremen		
1949	1. FC Saarbrücken		
1949–1961	Werder Bremen		
1963–1964	Werder Bremen	4	(0)
- * Club domestic league appearances and goals

Dragomir Ilic (16 August 1925 – 18 June 2004) was a Yugoslav professional footballer who played as a goalkeeper for Werder Bremen in the Oberliga Nord.

== Career ==
In his youth, Ilic played as a forward for BSK before his goalkeeping skills were found by Yugoslavian international Rajko Mitić.

He was discovered in a camp for displaced persons in Ostholstein. He played for a team called Serbische Weiße Adler in 1948 in Bremen. In January 1949 he made his first appearance for Werder Bremen in a match against Bremerhaven 93. He made his 500th appearance for the club in April 1959. He first retired in 1961 at the age of 36, having made over 300 appearances for Werder Bremen in the Oberliga Nord. He briefly came out of retirement in the 1963–64 season after six goalkeepers had sustained injuries and made four appearances in the Bundesliga, becoming the first non-German player for Werder Bremen in the Bundesliga. He was one of the oldest players to make their debuts in the newly formed Bundesliga, when he played against 1. FC Köln on 5 October 1963, aged 38 years and 50 days.
