= Sigvard Kinnunen =

Swedish weightlifter

Personal information
- Nationality: Swedish
- Born: 11 April 1920; Kiruna, Sweden
- Died: 5 April 1954 (aged 33); Kiruna, Sweden

Sport
- Sport: Weightlifting

Sigvard Kinnunen (11 April 1920 – 5 April 1954) was a Swedish weightlifter. He competed at the 1948 Summer Olympics and the 1952 Summer Olympics.
