= Ugo Cerroni =

Italian footballer

Personal information
- Date of birth: March 15, 1915
- Place of birth: Rome, Kingdom of Italy
- Date of death: July 28, 1978 (aged 63)
- Place of death: Rome, Italy
- Position: Midfielder

Senior career*
Years	Team	Apps	(Gls)
1933–1935	A.S. Alba Roma	?	(?)
1935–1937	Roma	10	(0)
1937–1938	Fiorentina	5	(1)
193?–1940	MATER	?	(?)
1943–1944	SS Avia	?	(?)
1944–1945	Italia Libera	?	(?)
- * Club domestic league appearances and goals

Ugo Cerroni (15 March 1915 – 28 July 1978) was an Italian professional football player. He played for two seasons (15 games, 1 goal) in the Serie A for A.S. Roma and ACF Fiorentina.
