= Georges Firmin =

French weightlifter (1924–2017)

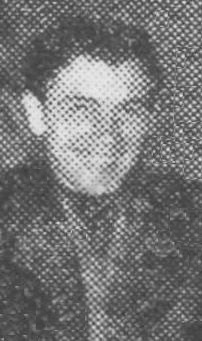
- Georges Firmin in 1942

Personal information
- Nationality: French
- Born: 15 March 1924; Montpellier, France
- Died: 12 November 2017 (aged 93)

Sport
- Sport: Weightlifting

Georges Firmin (15 March 1924 – 12 November 2017) was a French weightlifter. He competed at the 1948 Summer Olympics and the 1952 Summer Olympics.
