= Mohamed Ali Abdel Kerim =

Egyptian weightlifter

Personal information
- Nationality: Egyptian
- Born: 1 December 1927; Alexandria, Egypt

Sport
- Sport: Weightlifting

Mohamed Ali Abdel Kerim (born 1 December 1927) is an Egyptian weightlifter. He competed in the 1952 and 1960 Summer Olympics.
