= Lebanon at the 1975 Mediterranean Games =

91 athletes (74 male and 17 female) represented Lebanon at the 1975 7th Mediterranean games in Algeria. Lebanon won 3 gold medals and 2 bronze in these games; Mohamed Tarabulsi gave Lebanon its 3 gold medals thanks to his clean sweep of the 75 kg weightlifting snatch, jerk and total.

== Medal table ==
Rank	Nation	Gold	Silver	Bronze	Total
1	Italy	51	40	36	127
2	France	31	25	23	79
3	Yugoslavia	24	17	23	64
4	Spain	14	27	29	70
5	Turkey	12	11	8	31
6	Greece	9	12	16	37
7	Egypt	6	12	15	33
8	Algeria	4	7	9	20
9	Syria	3	2	11	16
10	Tunisia	3	2	2	7
11	Lebanon	3	0	2	5
12	Morocco	0	4	4	8
13	Libya	0	1	2	3
Totals (13 entries)		160	160	180	500

== Lebanese medals by sport ==
Sport	Gold	Silver	Bronze	Total
Weightlifting	3	0	0	3
Shot put	0	0	1	1
Wrestling	0	0	1	1
Totals (3 entries)	3	0	2	5

== Lebanese Medal winners ==
Event	Gold	Silver	Bronze
ATHLETICS (– men shot put)	Ivan Ivancic (YUG)	Jean-Marie Djebaili (ALG)	Omar Musa Mejbari (LIB)
WEIGHTLIFTING (– men snatch 75 Kg)	Mohamed Tarabulsi 142.5 Kg (LIB)	Anselmo Silvino 132.5 Kg (ITA)	Dusan Mirkovic 130 Kg (YUG)
WEIGHTLIFTING (– men jerk 75 Kg)	Mohamed Tarabulsi 165 Kg (LIB)	Anselmo Silvino 165 Kg (ITA)	Dusan Mirkovic 160 Kg (YUG)
WEIGHTLIFTING (– men total 75 Kg)	Mohamed Tarabulsi 307.5 Kg (LIB)	Anselmo Silvino 297.5 Kg (ITA)	Dusan Mirkovic 287.5 Kg (YUG)
WRESTLING (– men Greco-Roman +100 Kg)	Omer Topuz (TUR)	Danji (YUG)	Hassan Bchara (LIB)

== Medalists ==
Medal	Name	Sport	Event
Gold	Mohamed Tarabulsi	Weightlifting	men snatch 75 Kg
Gold	Mohamed Tarabulsi	Weightlifting	men jerk 75 Kg
Gold	Mohamed Tarabulsi	Weightlifting	men total 75 Kg
Bronze	Omar Musa Mejbari	athletics	men shot put
Bronze	Hassan Bchara	wrestling	men Greco-Roman +100 Kg
