= Lebanon at the 1967 Mediterranean Games =

Lebanon at the 1967 Mediterranean Games lists the achievements of Lebanese athletes at the 1967 Mediterranean Games in Tunis, Tunisia.

== Medals ==
Rank	Nation	Gold	Silver	Bronze	Total
1	Italy	35	26	22	83
2	Yugoslavia	15	16	5	36
3	Spain	10	14	27	51
4	Turkey	9	9	6	24
5	France	7	4	4	15
6	Tunisia	5	9	11	25
7	Greece	5	6	12	23
8	Morocco	1	1	3	5
9	Lebanon	0	1	2	3
10	Algeria	0	0	3	3
11	Libya	0	0	2	2
Totals (11 entries)		87	86	97	270

== Lebanese medals by sport ==
Sport	Gold	Silver	Bronze	Total
Weightlifting	0	1	1	2
Fencing	0	0	1	1
Totals (2 entries)	0	1	2	3

== Lebanese Medal winners ==
Event	Gold	Silver	Bronze
FENCING (– men Epée)	Jacques La Degaillerie 6 wins (FRA)	Gianfranco Paolucci 5 wins (ITA)	Ali Chokri 4 wins (LIB)
WEIGHTLIFTING (– men +90 Kg)	Jean-Paul Fouletier 422.5 Kg (FRA)	Kevork Lahamdjian 417.5 Kg (LIB)	Douiri 390 Kg (TUN)
WEIGHTLIFTING (– men 56 Kg)	Pepino Tanti 300 Kg (ITA)	Jean-Pierre Meurat 300 Kg (FRA)	Baydhoune Salah 285 Kg (LIB)

== Medalists ==
Medal	Name	Sport	Event
Silver	Kevork Lahamdjian	Weightlifting	men +90 Kg
Bronze	Baydhoune Salah	Weightlifting	men 56 Kg
Bronze	Ali Chokri	Fencing	men Epée
