= Pakistan at the 1960 Summer Olympics =

- IOC code: PAK
- NOC: National Olympic Committee of Pakistan
- Website: www.nocpakistan.org

in Rome
- Competitors: 44 (all men) in 7 sports
- Flag bearer: Muhammad Iqbal
- Medals Ranked 20th: Gold 1 Silver 0 Bronze 1 Total 2

Summer Olympics appearances (overview)
- 1948; 1952; 1956; 1960; 1964; 1968; 1972; 1976; 1980; 1984; 1988; 1992; 1996; 2000; 2004; 2008; 2012; 2016; 2020; 2024

Pakistan competed at the 1960 Summer Olympics in Rome, Italy. 44 competitors, all men, took part in 35 events in 7 sports. Here, they won their first Olympic Games gold medal by defeating India in the final of the men's hockey competition. The country also landed their first individual Olympic Games medal, a bronze, through welterweight wrestler Muhammad Bashir in the freestyle contests, making this Pakistan's most successful Olympics to date.

== Medalists ==
Medal	Name	Sport	Event	Date
Gold	Pakistan men's Abdul Hamid; Abdul Rashid; Abdul Waheed; Bashir Ahmad; Ghulam Rasul; Anwar Khan; Khursheed Aslam; Habib Ali Kiddie; Manzoor Hussain Atif; Munir Dar; Mushtaq Ahmed; Motiullah; Naseer Bunda; Noor Alam	Field hockey	Men's tournament	9 September
Bronze	Muhammad Bashir	Wrestling	Freestyle welterweight	6 September

Medals by sport
Sport	Gold	Silver	Bronze	Total
Field hockey	1	0	0	1
Wrestling	0	0	1	1
Total	1	0	1	2

== Athletics ==
Key

- Note–Ranks given for track events are within the athlete's heat only
- Q = Qualified for the next round
- q = Qualified for the next round as a fastest loser or, in field events, by position without achieving the qualifying target
- NR = National record
- DQ = Disqualified
- DNS / F = Did not start / finish
- N/A = Round not applicable for the event
- Bye = Athlete not required to compete in round
- NM = No mark

Track & road events

Men

Athlete	Event	Heat		Quarter-final		Semi-final		Final	
Athlete	Event	Result	Rank	Result	Rank	Result	Rank	Result	Rank
Abdul Khaliq	200 m	11.2	7	Did not advance					
Iftikhar Shah	200 m	DNF (Note: Retired.)	–	Did not advance					
Iftikhar Shah	100 m	DNS	–	Did not advance					
Abdul Khaliq	100 m	23.1	6	Did not advance					
Mubarak Shah	5000 m	15:54.2	12	Did not advance					
Abdul Khaliq; Abdul Malik; Ghulam Raziq; Muhammad Ramzan Ali	4 × 100 metres relay	42.67	3	N/A		42.99	6	Did not advance	
Ghulam Raziq	110 metres hurdles	14.6 Q	3	14.4 Q	3	14.3	4	Did not advance	
Abdul Malik	110 metres hurdles	15.4	6	Did not advance					
Muhammad Yaqub	400 metres hurdles	N/A		52.8	5	Did not advance			
Mubarak Shah	3000 metres steeplechase	9:20.0	9	Did not advance					

Field events
Men

Athlete	Event	Heat		Quarter-final		Semi-final		Final	
Athlete	Event	Result	Rank	Result	Rank	Result	Rank	Result	Rank
Muhammad Ramzan Ali	Long jump	NM (Note: Failed to record a jump.)	–	Did not advance					
Iftikhar Shah	Long jump	DNS	–	Did not advance					
Muhammad Khan	Triple jump	14.43	34	Did not advance					
Allah Ditta	Pole vault	4.00	26	Did not advance					
Haider Khan	Shot put	13.53	24	Did not advance					
Muhammad Iqbal	Hammer throw	60.86	11 Q	N/A				61.79	12
Haider Khan	Discus throw	46.57	33	Did not advance					
Muhammad Nawaz	Javelin throw	70.05	11	Did not advance					

== Boxing ==
Athlete	Event	Round of 32	Round of 16	Quarterfinals	Semifinals	Final	
Athlete	Event	Opposition Result	Opposition Result	Opposition Result	Opposition Result	Opposition Result	Rank
Muhammad Nasir	Bantamweight	Sadegh Ali Akbarzadeh Khoi (IRI); W 4–1	Thein Myint (BIR); L 0–5	did not advance			
Ghulam Sarwar	Lightweight	Adalberto Hernández (MEX); L 1–4	did not advance				
Ghulam Sarwar	Middleweight	Tadeusz Walasek (POL); L 0–5	did not advance				
Muhammad Safdar	Middleweight	Bye	Giulio Saraudi (ITA); L 0–5	did not advance			

== Cycling ==
=== Track ===
Sprint, tandem and pursuit

Athlete	Event	Round 1	Repechage	Round 2	Quarterfinals	Semifinals	Final	
Athlete	Event	Opposition Time	Opposition Time	Opposition Time	Opposition Time	Opposition Time	Opposition Time	Rank
Muhammad Ashiq	Sprint	André Gruchet (FRA); L 11.6	Luis Muciño (MEX); L 12.8	Did not advance				
Abdul Razzaq Baloch	Sprint	Kurt Rechsteiner (SUI); L 11.7	Herbert Francis (USA); L 12.1	Did not advance				
Muhammad Ashiq; Abdul Razzaq Baloch	Tandem	Roland Surrugue (FRA); Michel Scob (FRA); L 11.0	Did not advance					

Time trial

Athlete	Event	Time	Rank
Muhammad Ashiq	Time trial	1:20.17	25

== Hockey ==
Summary

Key:

- FT – After full-time.
- P – Match decided by penalty-shootout.

Team	Event	Group stage				Quarterfinal	Semifinal	Final / BM	
Team	Event	Opposition Score	Opposition Score	Opposition Score	Rank	Opposition Score	Opposition Score	Opposition Score	Rank
Pakistan men's	Men's tournament	Australia; W 3–0	Poland; W 8–0	Japan; W 10–0	1	Germany; W 2–1	Spain; W 1–0	India; W 1–0	1st place, gold medalist(s)

Team roster

Head coach:

Pos.	Player	DoB	Age	Tournament games	Tournament goals
FB	Manzoor Hussain Atif	4 September 1928	31	5	1
	Ghulam Rasool	1 May 1931	29	6	0
	Anwar Khan	24 September 1933	26	6	1
RW	Noor Alam	5 December 1925	30	6	2
	Abdul Hamid	7 January 1927	33	6	8
	Habib Ali Kiddie	7 December 1929	30	4	0
	Naseer Bunda	15 May 1932	28	6	7
	Motiullah	31 January 1938	22	6	1
	Abdul Rashid	1 June 1922	38	6	0
	Bashir Ahmed	23 December 1934	25	6	0
	Abdul Waheed	30 November 1936	23	6	4
	Mushtaq Ahmad	28 August 1932	27	2	1
	Khursheed Aslam	6 April 1936	24	1	0

=== Group stage ===
Pos	Team	Pld	W	D	L	GF	GA	GD	Pts	Qualification
1	Pakistan	3	3	0	0	21	0	+21	6	Quarter-finals
2	Australia (Note: Australia and Poland finished on equal points at the conclusion of the pool stage, resulting in a match to determine second place in the pool, which Australia won 2–0.)	3	1	1	1	9	5	+4	3	Quarter-finals
3	Poland	3	1	1	1	3	10	−7	3	9–12th place classification
4	Japan	3	0	0	3	2	20	−18	0	13–16th place classification

Source: FIH
Notes:

26 August 1960
10:00

Pakistan	3–0	Australia
H. Abdul 48'; Noor 53'; Mushtaq 56'

Stadio dei Marmi, Rome
Umpires:
Van Ballgoijen de Jong (NED)
Elgershuizen (NED)

29 August 1960
16:30

Pakistan	8–0	Poland
H. Abdul 6', 24', 55'; Noor 18'; Mutti 22'; W. Abdul 45', 69'; Nasir 60'

Stadio dei Marmi, Rome
Umpires:
Whitelaw (GBR)
McIldowie (RSA)

1 September 1960
10:00

Pakistan	10–0	Japan
W. Abdul 21', 30'; H. Abdul 24', 37', 50', 51'; Nasir 33', 45', 60'; Khan 59'

Olympic Velodrome, Rome
Umpires:
H. Singh (IND)
Burgess (GBR)

=== Quarter-finals ===
5 September 1960
14:30

Pakistan	2–1	United Team of Germany
Naseer 22', 62'		Delmes 52'

Olympic Velodrome, Rome
Umpires:
Asselman (BEL)
de Bourguignon (BEL)

=== Semi-finals ===
7 September 1960
10:00

Pakistan	1–0	Spain
Manzoor 12'

Olympic Velodrome, Rome
Umpires:
MacDowell (AUS)
Massart (BEL)

=== Gold medal match ===
9 September 1960
15:30

Pakistan	1–0	India
Bunda 6'

Olympic Velodrome, Rome
Umpires:
MacDowell (AUS)
Massart (BEL)

== Shooting ==
Athlete	Event	Qualifying		Final	
Athlete	Event	Points	Rank	Points	Rank
Muhammad Iqbal	25 m rapid fire pistol	N/A		501	55
Zafar Ahmed Muhammad	50 m pistol	289	31	Did not advance	
Abdul Aziz Wains	300 m free rifle, three positions	487	19 Q	DNS	
Saifi Chaudhry	50 m rifle three positions	506	34	Did not advance	
Saifi Chaudhry	50 m rifle prone	373	39	Did not advance	

== Weightlifting ==
Athlete	Event	Press		Snatch		Clean & jerk		Total	
Athlete	Event	Result	Rank	Result	Rank	Result	Rank	Result	Rank
Muhammad Azam	56 kg	AC	AC	82.5	18	100.0	–	217.5	AC
Abdul Ghani Butt	67.5 kg	AC	AC	92.5	25	125.0	20	217.5	AC

== Wrestling ==
Key:

- VFA – Victory by fall.
- VIN – Victory by injury (VF for forfeit, VA for withdrawal or disqualification)
- VPO – Decision by points.

Athlete	Event	Round 1		Round 2		Round 3		Round 4		Round 5		Round 6		Total	
Athlete	Event	Opposition Result	Points	Opposition Result	Points	Opposition Result	Points	Opposition Result	Points	Opposition Result	Points	Opposition Result	Points	Points	Rank
Din Nawab	Flyweight	Seán O'Connor (IRL); W^{VFA}	=1	Nikola Vasilev Dimitrov (BUL); W^{VPO}	=4	Masayuki Matsubara (JPN); L ^{VFA}	9	Ahmet Bilek (TUR); L ^{VFA}	9	did not advance					
Muhammad Siraj-Din	Bantamweight	Walter Pilling (GBR); W^{VFA}	=1	Tauno Jaskari (FIN); L^{VPO}	=7	Mykhailo Shakhov (URS); L ^{VPO}	=10	did not advance							
Muhammad Akhtar	Featherweight	Mohammad Ibrahim Kederi (AFG); W^{VFA}	=1	Tamiji Sato (JPN); L^{VPO}	=6	Jan Żurawski (POL); W ^{VPO}	=7	Vladimer Rubashvili (URS); W ^{VPO}	6	Mustafa Dağıstanlı (TUR); W ^{VPO}	6	did not advance			
Muhammad Siraj-Din	Lightweight	Moustafa Tajiki (IRN); L^{VFA}	=22	Nick Stamulus (AUS); W^{VPO}	=15	Roger Bielle (FRA); W ^{VPO}	12	did not advance							
Muhammad Bashir	Welterweight	Peter Amey (GBR); W^{VFA}	0	Juan Rolón (ARG); W^{VPO}	1	Emam Ali Habibi (IRN); L ^{VPO}	3	Karl Bruggmann (SUI); W ^{VFA}	0	Gaetano De Vescovi (ITA); W ^{VPO}	1	İsmail Ogan (TUR); L ^{VPO} Doug Blubaugh (USA); L ^{VFA}	7	12	3rd place, bronze medalist(s)
Faiz Muhammad	Middleweight	Takashi Nagai (JPN); L^{VPO}	3	Mohammad Asif Khokan (AFG); W ^{VPO}	1	Did not advance									
Muhammad Nazir	Heavyweight	Lyutvi Akhmedov (BUL); L^{VFA}	4	Nizam-ud-din Subhani (AFG); W^{VPO}	1	Hamit Kaplan (TUR); L ^{VFA}	4	Did not advance							
