= Iran at the 1960 Summer Olympics =

- IOC code: IRI (IRN used at these Games)
- NOC: National Olympic Committee of Iran

in Rome, Italy
- Competitors: 23 in 5 sports
- Flag bearer: Jafar Salmasi
- Medals Ranked 27th: Gold 0 Silver 1 Bronze 3 Total 4

Summer Olympics appearances (overview)
- 1900; 1904–1936; 1948; 1952; 1956; 1960; 1964; 1968; 1972; 1976; 1980–1984; 1988; 1992; 1996; 2000; 2004; 2008; 2012; 2016; 2020; 2024; 2028

Iran competed at the 1960 Summer Olympics in Rome, Italy. 25 athletes represented Iran in the 1960 Olympics.

== Competitors ==
| Sport | Men | Women | Total |
|---|---|---|---|
| Athletics | 1 | | 1 |
| Boxing | 4 | | 4 |
| Shooting | 1 | | 1 |
| Weightlifting | 5 | | 5 |
| Wrestling | 12 | | 12 |
| Total | 23 | 0 | 23 |

== Medal summary ==
=== Medal table ===
| Sport | Gold | Silver | Bronze | Total |
|---|---|---|---|---|
| Weightlifting | | | 1 | 1 |
| Wrestling | | 1 | 2 | 3 |
| Total | 0 | 1 | 3 | 4 |

=== Medalists ===
| Medal | Name | Sport | Event |
|---|---|---|---|
| Silver | Gholamreza Takhti | Wrestling | Men's freestyle 87 kg |
| Bronze | Esmaeil Elmkhah | Weightlifting | Men's 56 kg |
| Bronze | Ebrahim Seifpour | Wrestling | Men's freestyle 52 kg |
| Bronze | Mohammad Paziraei | Wrestling | Men's Greco-Roman 52 kg |

== Results by event ==
=== Athletics ===
Men

| Athlete | Event | Qualification | | Final | |
| Athlete | Event | Result | Rank | Result | Rank |
|---|---|---|---|---|---|
| Rouhollah Rahmani | Triple jump | 14.70 | 30 | Did not advance | |

=== Boxing ===
Men

| Athlete | Event | 1/32 final | 1/16 final | 1/8 final | Quarterfinal | Semifinal | Final | Rank |
|---|---|---|---|---|---|---|---|---|
| Ezaria Ilkhanoff | 51 kg | Bye | Badrian (RHO); W 4–1 | Botta (ARG); L Walkover | Did not advance | | | 9 |
| Sadegh Aliakbarzadeh | 54 kg | Bye | Nasir (PAK); L 1–4 | Did not advance | | | | 17 |
| Vazik Kazarian | 63.5 kg | Bye | Kelsey (GBR); L 2–3 | Did not advance | | | | 17 |
| Ghasem Amiryavari | 67 kg | Bye | Cornejo (CHI); W 3–2 | Drogosz (POL); L 0–5 | Did not advance | | | 9 |

=== Shooting ===
Men

| Athlete | Event | Elimination round | | Final | |
| Athlete | Event | Score | Rank | Score | Rank |
|---|---|---|---|---|---|
| Gholam Hossein Mobasser | 50 m rifle 3 positions | 471 | 71 | did not advance | |
| Gholam Hossein Mobasser | 50 m rifle prone | 384 | 33 Q | 567 | 50 |

=== Weightlifting ===
Men

| Athlete | Event | Press | Snatch | Clean & Jerk | Total | Rank |
|---|---|---|---|---|---|---|
| Esmaeil Elmkhah | 56 kg | 97.5 | 100.0 | 132.5 | 330.0 | 3rd place, bronze medalist(s) |
| Ali Safa-Sonboli | 60 kg | 92.5 | No mark | — | — | — |
| Henrik Tamraz | 67.5 kg | 112.5 | 105.0 | 130.0 | 347.5 | 14 |
| Mohammad Ami-Tehrani | 75 kg | 117.5 | 120.0 | 155.0 | 392.5 | 6 |
| Mongashti Amirian | 82.5 kg | 120.0 | 120.0 | 150.0 | 390.0 | 10 |

=== Wrestling ===
Men's freestyle

| Athlete | Event | First round | Second round | Third round | Fourth round | Fifth round | Sixth round | Final round | Rank |
|---|---|---|---|---|---|---|---|---|---|
| Ebrahim Seifpour | 52 kg | Gröning (AUS); W Fall | Rantala (FIN); W Fall | Kropp (POL); W Fall | Zoete (FRA); W Fall | Aliev (URS); W Fall | Bilek (TUR); L Points | Matsubara (JPN); L Points | 3rd place, bronze medalist(s) |
| Mehdi Yaghoubi | 57 kg | Akbaş (TUR); D Points | Mancini (SMR); W Fall | Im (KOR); W Points | Asai (JPN); L Points | Did not advance | | Did not advance | 7 |
| Mohammad Khadem | 62 kg | Rubashvili (URS); L Fall | Giani (USA); W Points | Kang (KOR); W Fall | Sato (JPN); L Fall | Did not advance | | | 8 |
| Mostafa Tajik | 67 kg | Ashrafuddin (PAK); W Fall | Şahinkaya (TUR); W Points | Nazem (LIB); W Fall | Ries (RSA); W Fall | Valchev (BUL); L Fall | Wilson (USA); L Points | | 4 |
| Emam-Ali Habibi | 73 kg | Choi (KOR); W Fall | Carlsson (SWE); W Points | Bashir (PAK); W Points | De Vescovi (ITA); W Points | Blubaugh (USA); L Fall | | Did not advance | 4 |
| Mansour Mehdizadeh | 79 kg | Thomas (NZL); L Fall | Antonsson (SWE); W Points | Güngör (TUR); D Points | Did not advance | | | | 12 |
| Gholamreza Takhti | 87 kg | Gunga (AFG); W Fall | Parsons (AUS); W Fall | Kawano (JPN); W Fall | Gurics (HUN); W Fall | van Zyl (RSA); W Fall | | Atlı (TUR); L Points | 2nd place, silver medalist(s) |
| Yaghoub Ali Shourvarzi | +87 kg | Ordman (RSA); W Fall | Dzarasov (URS); L Fall | Dietrich (EUA); L Fall | Did not advance | | | Did not advance | 10 |

Men's Greco-Roman

| Athlete | Event | First round | Second round | Third round | Fourth round | Fifth round | Sixth round | Final round | Rank |
|---|---|---|---|---|---|---|---|---|---|
| Mohammad Paziraei | 52 kg | Mewis (BEL); W Points | El-Sayed (EGY); L Points | Hajduk (POL); W Points | Bye | Kochergin (URS); W Points | | | 3rd place, bronze medalist(s) |
| Ali Banihashemi | 57 kg | Švec (TCH); L Points | Dora (YUG); L Points | Did not advance | | | | Did not advance | 17 |
| Hossein Mollaghasemi | 62 kg | Mäkinen (FIN); W Points | Gregório (POR); W Fall | Allen (USA); W Points | Şulţ (ROU); W Points | Vyrupayev (URS); L Fall | Did not advance | | 6 |
| Mansour Hazrati | 79 kg | Punkari (FIN); D Points | Kormaník (TCH); L Points | Ayvaz (TUR); L Points | Did not advance | | | | 14 |
