= United States at the 1960 Summer Olympics =

- Flag of the United States with 50 stars. This was the first Olympics where this design was used.
- IOC code: USA (SUA used at these Games)
- NOC: United States Olympic Committee

in Rome
- Competitors: 292 (241 men and 51 women) in 17 sports
- Flag bearer: Rafer Johnson
- Medals Ranked 2nd: Gold 34 Silver 21 Bronze 16 Total 71

Summer Olympics appearances (overview)
- 1896; 1900; 1904; 1908; 1912; 1920; 1924; 1928; 1932; 1936; 1948; 1952; 1956; 1960; 1964; 1968; 1972; 1976; 1980; 1984; 1988; 1992; 1996; 2000; 2004; 2008; 2012; 2016; 2020; 2024; 2028

Other related appearances
- 1906 Intercalated Games

The United States competed at the 1960 Summer Olympics in Rome, Italy. It was the first Olympics in which the athletes marched under the present 50-star flag. 292 competitors, 241 men and 51 women, took part in 147 events in 17 sports.

The 1960 Summer Olympics was the first Olympics in history that was being covered by a television provider. American network CBS became the first official broadcaster of the games, by purchasing the rights to cover the Rome Olympics.

The 1960 Summer Olympics also brought one of the first appearances of one of the greatest heavyweight boxers ever, Muhammad Ali. Since Ali participated at these Olympic Games as an 18-year-old before his conversion to Islam, he fought under the name Cassius Clay. Rafer Johnson became the first Black American athlete to carry the U.S. flag during the opening ceremony. He subsequently won the gold medal in the decathlon.

== Medalists ==
Medal	Name	Sport	Event	Date
Gold	Gary Tobian	Diving	Men's 3 m springboard	August 29
Gold	Bill Mulliken	Swimming	Men's 200 m breaststroke	August 30
Gold	Carolyn Schuler	Swimming	Women's 100 m butterfly	August 30
Gold	Bill Nieder	Athletics	Men's shot put	August 31
Gold	Dick Blick; Steve Clark^{[a]} Bill Darnton^{[a]} Jeff Farrell; George Harrison; Mike Troy; Tom Winters^{[a]}	Swimming	Men's 4 × 200 m freestyle relay	September 1
Gold	Bob Bennett^{[a]} Steve Clark^{[a]} Jeff Farrell; Dave Gillanders^{[a]} Paul Hait; Lance Larson; Frank McKinney	Swimming	Men's 4 × 100 m medley relay	September 1
Gold	Chris von Saltza	Swimming	Women's 400 m freestyle	September 1
Gold	Glenn Davis	Athletics	Men's 400 m hurdles	September 2
Gold	Ralph Boston	Athletics	Men's long jump	September 2
Gold	Wilma Rudolph	Athletics	Women's 100 m	September 2
Gold	Bob Webster	Diving	Men's 10 m platform	September 2
Gold	Mike Troy	Swimming	Men's 200 m butterfly	September 2
Gold	Lynn Burke; Patty Kempner; Carolyn Schuler; Joan Spillane^{[a]} Chris von Saltza; Anne Warner^{[a]} Carolyn Wood^{[a]}	Swimming	Women's 4 × 100 m medley relay	September 2
Gold	Dan Ayrault; Ted Nash; John Sayre; Rusty Wailes	Rowing	Coxless four	September 3
Gold	Lynn Burke	Swimming	Women's 100 m backstroke	September 3
Gold	Molly Botkin^{[a]} Donna de Varona^{[a]} Susan Doerr^{[a]} Sylvia Ruuska^{[a]} Joan Spillane; Shirley Stobs; Chris von Saltza; Carolyn Wood	Swimming	Women's 4 × 100 m freestyle relay	September 3
Gold	Lee Calhoun	Athletics	Men's 110 m hurdles	September 5
Gold	Wilma Rudolph	Athletics	Women's 200 m	September 5
Gold	Wilbert McClure	Boxing	Light middleweight	September 5
Gold	Eddie Crook Jr.	Boxing	Middleweight	September 5
Gold	Cassius Clay	Boxing	Light heavyweight	September 5
Gold	Otis Davis	Athletics	Men's 400 m	September 6
Gold	Rafer Johnson	Athletics	Men's decathlon	September 6
Gold	Terrence McCann	Wrestling	Freestyle bantamweight	September 6
Gold	Shelby Wilson	Wrestling	Freestyle lightweight	September 6
Gold	Douglas Blubaugh	Wrestling	Freestyle welterweight	September 6
Gold	Don Bragg	Athletics	Men's pole vault	September 7
Gold	Al Oerter	Athletics	Men's discus throw	September 7
Gold	James Hunt; George O'Day; David Smith	Sailing	5.5 Meter	September 7
Gold	Charles Vinci	Weightlifting	56 kg	September 7
Gold	Glenn Davis; Otis Davis; Jack Yerman; Earl Young	Athletics	Men's 4 × 400 m relay	September 8
Gold	Martha Hudson; Barbara Jones; Wilma Rudolph; Lucinda Williams	Athletics	Women's 4 × 100 m relay	September 8
Gold	William McMillan	Shooting	Men's 25 m rapid fire pistol	September 9
Gold	United States men's national basketball team: Jay Arnette; Walt Bellamy; Bob Boozer; Terry Dischinger; Burdette Haldorson; Darrall Imhoff; Allen Kelley; Lester Lane; Jerry Lucas; Oscar Robertson; Adrian Smith; Jerry West	Basketball	Men's tournament	September 10
Silver	Paula Jean Myers-Pope	Diving	Women's 3 m springboard	August 27
Silver	Lance Larson	Swimming	Men's 100 m freestyle	August 27
Silver	Sam Hall	Diving	Men's 3 m springboard	August 29
Silver	Chris von Saltza	Swimming	Women's 100 m freestyle	August 29
Silver	Paula Jean Myers-Pope	Diving	Women's 10 m platform	August 30
Silver	Parry O'Brien	Athletics	Men's shot put	August 31
Silver	Frank McKinney	Swimming	Men's 100 m backstroke	August 31
Silver	Dave Sime	Athletics	Men's 100 m	September 1
Silver	Clifton Cushman	Athletics	Men's 400 m hurdles	September 2
Silver	Bo Roberson	Athletics	Men's long jump	September 2
Silver	Gary Tobian	Diving	Men's 10 platform	September 2
Silver	Lester Carney	Athletics	Men's 200 m	September 3
Silver	Willie May	Athletics	Men's 110 m hurdles	September 5
Silver	Ron Morris	Athletics	Men's pole vault	September 7
Silver	Rink Babka	Athletics	Men's discus throw	September 7
Silver	Issac Berger	Weightlifting	60 kg	September 7
Silver	Tommy Kono	Weightlifting	75 kg	September 8
Silver	Jim George	Weightlifting	82.5 kg	September 9
Silver	James Enoch Hill	Shooting	Men's 50 m rifle, prone	September 10
Silver	James Bradford	Weightlifting	+90 kg	September 10
Silver	Frank Chapot; George H. Morris; William Steinkraus	Equestrian	Team jumping	September 11
Bronze	Albert Axelrod	Fencing	Men's foil	August 30
Bronze	Dallas Long	Athletics	Men's shot put	August 31
Bronze	Robert Beck	Modern pentathlon	Individual	August 31
Bronze	Robert Beck; Jack Daniels; George Lambert	Modern pentathlon	Team	August 31
Bronze	Bob Bennett	Swimming	Men's 100 m backstroke	August 31
Bronze	John Thomas	Athletics	Men's high jump	September 1
Bronze	Dick Howard	Athletics	Men's 400 m hurdles	September 2
Bronze	Earlene Brown	Athletics	Women's shot put	September 2
Bronze	Dave Gillanders	Swimming	Men's 200 m butterfly	September 2
Bronze	Richard Draeger; Conn Findlay; Kent Mitchell (c)	Rowing	Coxed pair	September 3
Bronze	George Breen	Swimming	Men's 1500 m freestyle	September 3
Bronze	Hayes Jones	Athletics	Men's 110 m hurdles	September 5
Bronze	Quincey Daniels	Boxing	Light welterweight	September 5
Bronze	Dick Cochran	Athletics	Men's discus throw	September 7
Bronze	Robert Halperin; William Parks	Sailing	Star	September 7
Bronze	Norbert Schemansky	Weightlifting	+90 kg	September 10

Medals by sport
Sport	1st place, gold medalist(s)	2nd place, silver medalist(s)	3rd place, bronze medalist(s)	Total
Athletics	12	8	6	26
Swimming	9	3	3	15
Boxing	3	0	1	4
Wrestling	3	0	0	3
Diving	2	4	0	6
Weightlifting	1	4	1	6
Shooting	1	1	0	2
Rowing	1	0	1	2
Sailing	1	0	1	2
Basketball	1	0	0	1
Equestrian	0	1	0	1
Modern pentathlon	0	0	2	2
Fencing	0	0	1	1
Total	34	21	16	71

Medals by day
Day	Date	1st place, gold medalist(s)	2nd place, silver medalist(s)	3rd place, bronze medalist(s)	Total
1	August 26	0	0	0	0
2	August 27	0	2	0	2
3	August 28	0	0	0	0
4	August 29	1	2	0	3
5	August 30	2	1	1	4
6	August 31	1	2	4	7
7	September 1	3	1	1	5
8	September 2	6	3	3	12
9	September 3	3	1	2	6
10	September 4	0	0	0	0
11	September 5	5	1	2	8
12	September 6	5	0	0	5
13	September 7	4	3	2	9
14	September 8	2	1	0	3
15	September 9	1	1	0	2
16	September 10	1	2	1	4
17	September 11	0	1	0	1
Total		34	21	16	71

Medals by gender
Gender	1st place, gold medalist(s)	2nd place, silver medalist(s)	3rd place, bronze medalist(s)	Total
Male	26	18	15	59
Female	8	3	1	12
Total	34	21	16	71

Multiple medalists
Name	Sport	1st place, gold medalist(s)	2nd place, silver medalist(s)	3rd place, bronze medalist(s)	Total
Chris von Saltza	Swimming	3	1	0	4
Wilma Rudolph	Athletics	3	0	0	3
Lynn Burke	Swimming	2	0	0	2
Steve Clark	Swimming	2	0	0	2
Glenn Davis	Athletics	2	0	0	2
Otis Davis	Athletics	2	0	0	2
Jeff Farrell	Swimming	2	0	0	2
Carolyn Schuler	Swimming	2	0	0	2
Joan Spillane	Swimming	2	0	0	2
Mike Troy	Swimming	2	0	0	2
Carolyn Wood	Swimming	2	0	0	2
Lance Larson	Swimming	1	1	0	2
Frank McKinney	Swimming	1	1	0	2
Gary Tobian	Diving	1	1	0	2
Bob Bennett	Swimming	1	0	1	2
Dave Gillanders	Swimming	1	0	1	2
Paula Jean Myers-Pope	Diving	0	2	0	2
Robert Beck	Modern pentathlon	0	0	2	2

^{a} Athletes who participated in preliminary round(s) but not the final.

== Athletics ==
Key

- Note–Ranks given for track events are within the athlete's heat only
- Q = Qualified for the next round
- q = Qualified for the next round as a fastest loser or, in field events, by position without achieving the qualifying target

Track & road events
Men

Athlete	Event	Heat		Quarterfinal		Semifinal		Final	
Athlete	Event	Time	Rank	Time	Rank	Time	Rank	Time	Rank
Frank Budd	100 m	10.4	2 Q	10.4	1 Q	10.5	3 Q	10.3	5
Ray Norton	100 m	10.7	1 Q	10.6	3 Q	10.4	3 Q	10.4	6
Dave Sime	100 m	10.5	3 Q	10.3	2 Q	10.4	2 Q	10.2	2nd place, silver medalist(s)
Lester Carney	200 m	21.1	1 Q	20.9	1 Q	21.1	3 Q	20.6	2nd place, silver medalist(s)
Stone Johnson	200 m	21.7	1 Q	20.9	1 Q	20.8	3 Q	20.8	5
Ray Norton	200 m	21.2	1 Q	21.0	2 Q	20.7	2 Q	20.9	6
Otis Davis	400 m	46.8	1 Q	45.9	1 Q	45.5	1 Q	44.9 WR	1st place, gold medalist(s)
Jack Yerman	400 m	47.2	1 Q	46.4	2 Q	48.9	6	Did not advance	
Earl Young	400 m	47.6	2 Q	46.1	1 Q	46.1	3 Q	45.9	6
Ernie Cunliffe	800 m	1:48.95	3 Q	1:49.83	2 Q	1:50.92	6	Did not advance	
Tom Murphy	800 m	1:52.30	1 Q	1:48.12	1 Q	1:48.29	6	Did not advance	
Jerry Siebert	800 m	1:49.08	2 Q	1:51.53	3 Q	1:48.20	4	Did not advance	
Dyrol Burleson	1500 m	—N/a				3:42.40	3 Q	3:40.9	6
Pete Close	1500 m	—N/a				3:50.69	9	Did not advance	
Jim Grelle	1500 m	—N/a				3:43.65	2 Q	3:45.0	8
Jim Beatty	5000 m	14:44.40	9	—N/a				Did not advance	
Bill Dellinger	5000 m	14:08.72	4	—N/a				Did not advance	
Bob Soth	5000 m	14:40.85	7	—N/a				Did not advance	
Max Truex	10,000 m	—N/a						28:50.34	6
Lee Calhoun	110 m hurdles	14.3	1 Q	14.1	1 Q	13.7	1 Q	13.8	1st place, gold medalist(s)
Hayes Jones	110 m hurdles	14.2	1 Q	14.1	1 Q	14.1	2 Q	14.0	3rd place, bronze medalist(s)
Willie May	110 m hurdles	14.0	1 Q	13.8	1 Q	13.7	1 Q	13.8	2nd place, silver medalist(s)
Cliff Cushman	400 m hurdles	—N/a		51.8	1 Q	50.8	1 Q	49.6	2nd place, silver medalist(s)
Glenn Davis	400 m hurdles	—N/a		52.2	2 Q	51.1	1 Q	49.3 OR	1st place, gold medalist(s)
Dick Howard	400 m hurdles	—N/a		51.2	2 Q	50.8	2 Q	49.7	3rd place, bronze medalist(s)
Phil Coleman	3000 m steeplechase	8:56.72	5	—N/a				Did not advance	
Deacon Jones	3000 m steeplechase	8:49.32	2 Q	—N/a				9:18.22	7
George Young	3000 m steeplechase	8:50.93	4	—N/a				Did not advance	
Frank Budd; Stone Johnson; Ray Norton; Dave Sime	4 × 100 m relay	39.87	1 Q	—N/a		39.67	1 Q	DSQ	
Glenn Davis; Otis Davis; Jack Yerman; Earl Young	4 × 400 m relay	3:10.58	1 Q	—N/a		3:08.57	1 Q	3:02.37 WR	1st place, gold medalist(s)
Alex Breckenridge	Marathon	—N/a						2:29:38.0	30
John J. Kelly	Marathon	—N/a						2:24:58.0	19
Gordon McKenzie	Marathon	—N/a						2:35:16.0	48
Rudy Haluza	20 km walk	—N/a						1:45:11.0	24
Bob Mimm	20 km walk	—N/a						1:45:09.0	23
Ron Zinn	20 km walk	—N/a						1:42:47.0	19
John Allen	50 km walk	—N/a						5:03:15.12	24
Ron Laird	50 km walk	—N/a						4:53:21.6	19
Bruce MacDonald	50 km walk	—N/a						5:00:47.6	23

Women

Athlete	Event	Heat		Quarterfinal		Semifinal		Final	
Athlete	Event	Time	Rank	Time	Rank	Time	Rank	Time	Rank
Martha Hudson	100 m	12.33	4 Q	12.30	3	Did not advance			
Barbara Jones	100 m	11.91	2 Q	12.02	2 Q	11.84	4	Did not advance	
Wilma Rudolph	100 m	11.65	1 Q	11.70	1 Q	11.41 OR	1 Q	11.18	1st place, gold medalist(s)
Ernestine Pollards	200 m	24.64	4	—N/a		Did not advance			
Wilma Rudolph	200 m	23.30 OR	1 Q	—N/a		23.79	1 Q	24.13	1st place, gold medalist(s)
Lucinda Williams	200 m	24.10	2 Q	—N/a		25.14	5	Did not advance	
Pat Daniels	800 m	DSQ		—N/a				Did not advance	
Shirley Crowder	80 m hurdles	12.43	4	—N/a		Did not advance			
Irene Robertson	80 m hurdles	11.69	5	—N/a		Did not advance			
Jo Ann Terry	80 m hurdles	11.59	4	—N/a		Did not advance			
Martha Hudson; Barbara Jones; Wilma Rudolph; Lucinda Williams	4 × 100 m relay	44.50 WR	1 Q	—N/a				44.72	1st place, gold medalist(s)

Field events
Men

Athlete	Event	Qualification		Final	
Athlete	Event	Result	Rank	Result	Rank
Ralph Boston	Long jump	7.60	6 Q	8.12 OR	1st place, gold medalist(s)
Bo Roberson	Long jump	7.81	1 Q	8.11	2nd place, silver medalist(s)
Anthony Watson	Long jump	7.32	20	Did not advance	
Ira Davis	Triple jump	15.64	12 Q	16.41	4
Bill Sharpe	Triple jump	15.44	17	Did not advance	
Herman Stokes	Triple jump	14.74	28	Did not advance	
Charlie Dumas	High jump	2.00	=15 Q	2.03	6
Joe Faust	High jump	2.00	=15 Q	1.95	17
John Thomas	High jump	2.00	1 Q	2.14	3rd place, bronze medalist(s)
Don Bragg	Pole vault	4.40	3 Q	4.70 OR	1st place, gold medalist(s)
Dave Clark	Pole vault	4.20	=18	Did not advance	
Ron Morris	Pole vault	4.30	11 q	4.60	2nd place, silver medalist(s)
Dallas Long	Shot put	17.65	1 Q	19.01	3rd place, bronze medalist(s)
Bill Nieder	Shot put	17.14	7 Q	19.68 OR	1st place, gold medalist(s)
Parry O'Brien	Shot put	17.29	4 Q	19.11	2nd place, silver medalist(s)
Rink Babka	Discus throw	54.48	4 Q	58.02	2nd place, silver medalist(s)
Dick Cochran	Discus throw	53.79	7 Q	57.16	3rd place, bronze medalist(s)
Al Oerter	Discus throw	58.43 OR	1 Q	59.18 OR	1st place, gold medalist(s)
William Alley	Javelin throw	68.66	23	Did not advance	
Terence Beucher	Javelin throw	68.11	25	Did not advance	
Al Cantello	Javelin throw	79.72	2 Q	74.70	10
Ed Bagdonas	Hammer throw	59.48	19	Did not advance	
Hal Connolly	Hammer throw	63.02	5 Q	63.59	8
Albert Hall	Hammer throw	60.76	12 Q	59.76	14

Women

Athlete	Event	Qualification		Final	
Athlete	Event	Result	Rank	Result	Rank
Annie Smith	Long jump	NM		Did not advance	
Willye White	Long jump	6.07	6 Q	5.77	16
Barbara Brown	High jump	1.50	=21	Did not advance	
Jean Gaertner	High jump	1.50	=21	Did not advance	
Neomia Rogers	High jump	1.65	=7 Q	1.65	14
Earlene Brown	Shot put	16.15	1 Q	16.42	3rd place, bronze medalist(s)
Earlene Brown	Discus throw	51.17	4 Q	51.29	6
Olga Connolly	Discus throw	48.32	10 Q	50.95	7
Pam Kurrell	Discus throw	43.23	19	Did not advance	
Karen Anderson	Javelin throw	50.62	4 Q	46.52	13

Combined event – Men's decathlon

Athlete	Event	100 m	LJ	SP	HJ	400 m	110H	DT	PV	JT	1500 m	Points	Rank
Dave Edstrom	Result	11.4	6.39	13.59	NM	WD						DNF	
Dave Edstrom	Points	768	610	729	0	WD						DNF	
Rafer Johnson	Result	10.9	7.35	15.82	1.85	48.3	15.3	48.49	4.10	69.76	4:49.7	8392 OR	1st place, gold medalist(s)
Rafer Johnson	Points	948	906	976	832	985	740	894	795	980	336	8392 OR	1st place, gold medalist(s)
Phil Mulkey	Result	11.5	6.57	14.10	1.83	52.2	18.1	34.12	WD			DNF	
Phil Mulkey	Points	737	746	780	806	690	283	473	WD			DNF	

== Basketball ==
Summary

Team	Event	Preliminary round				Semifinal round				Medal round		
Team	Event	Opponent Result	Opponent Result	Opponent Result	Rank	Opponent Result	Opponent Result	Opponent Result	Rank	Opponent Result	Opponent Result	Rank
United States men	Men's tournament	Italy; W 88–54	Japan; W 125–66	Hungary; W 107–63	1 Q	Yugoslavia; W 104–42	Uruguay; W 108–50	Soviet Union; W 81–57	1 Q	Italy; W 112–81	Brazil; W 90–63	1st place, gold medalist(s)

Roster

United States men's national basketball team – 1960 Summer Olympics roster
Players
Coaches

Pos.	No.	Name	Age – Date of birth	Height	Club	Ctr.
G	13	Jay Arnette	21 – December 19, 1938	1.88 m (6 ft 2 in)	Texas	(United States)
C	4	Walt Bellamy	21 – July 24, 1939	2.11 m (6 ft 11 in)	Indiana	(United States)
F	5	Bob Boozer	23 – April 26, 1937	2.03 m (6 ft 8 in)	Peoria Caterpillars	(United States)
F	6	Terry Dischinger	19 – November 21, 1940	2.01 m (6 ft 7 in)	Purdue	(United States)
F	7	Burdette Haldorson	26 – January 12, 1934	2.06 m (6 ft 9 in)	Phillips 66ers	(United States)
C	8	Darrall Imhoff	21 – October 11, 1938	2.08 m (6 ft 10 in)	California	(United States)
G	9	Allen Kelley	27 – December 24, 1932	1.80 m (5 ft 11 in)	Peoria Caterpillars	(United States)
G	10	Lester Lane	28 – March 6, 1932	1.78 m (5 ft 10 in)	Wichita Vickers	(United States)
F	11	Jerry Lucas	20 – March 30, 1940	2.03 m (6 ft 8 in)	Ohio State	(United States)
F	14	Oscar Robertson	21 – November 24, 1938	1.96 m (6 ft 5 in)	Cincinnati	(United States)
G	12	Adrian Smith	23 – October 5, 1936	1.85 m (6 ft 1 in)	U.S. Armed Forces	(United States)
G	3	Jerry West	22 – May 28, 1938	1.91 m (6 ft 3 in)	West Virginia	(United States)

Head coach

(United States) Pete Newell

Legend

- Club – describes last
  club before the tournament
- Age – describes age
  on August 26, 1960

Preliminary round

Pos	Team	Pld	W	L	PF	PA	PD	Pts	Qualification
1	United States	3	3	0	320	183	+137	6	Semifinals
2	Italy (H)	3	2	1	226	247	−21	5	Semifinals
3	Hungary	3	1	2	223	245	−22	4	9th–16th classification round
4	Japan	3	0	3	224	318	−94	3	9th–16th classification round

Source: FIBA archive
Rules for classification: 1) points; 2) head-to-head points; 3) head-to-head goal average; 4) head-to-head number of points scored.
(H) Hosts

August 26
21:30

United States	88–54	Italy
Scoring by half: 42–17, 46–37
Pts: Smith (18)		Pts: Lombardi (17)

Palazzetto dello sport, Rome
Referees: R. Weber (Switzerland)
B. Takev (Bulgaria)

August 27
16:00

United States	125–66	Japan
Scoring by half: 65–36, 60–30
Pts: Lucas (28)		Pts: Shoji (13)

Palazzetto dello sport, Rome
Referees: R. Righetto (Brazil)
B. Harvey (New Zealand)

August 29
9:00

United States	107–63	Hungary
Scoring by half: 48–34, 59–29
Pts: Robertson (22)		Pts: Bánhegyi, Temesvári (22)

Palazzetto dello sport, Rome
Referees: R. Weber (Switzerland)
Azuar (Spain)

Semifinal round

Pos	Team	Pld	W	L	PF	PA	PD	Pts	Qualification
1	United States	3	3	0	293	149	+144	6	Medal round
2	Soviet Union	3	2	1	234	195	+39	5	Medal round
3	Yugoslavia	3	1	2	197	275	−78	4	5th–8th classification round
4	Uruguay	3	0	3	186	291	−105	3	5th–8th classification round

Source: FIBA archive
Rules for classification: 1) points; 2) head-to-head points; 3) head-to-head goal average; 4) head-to-head number of points scored.

September 1
17:30

Yugoslavia	42–104	United States
Scoring by half: 16–63, 26–41
Pts: Korac (16)		Pts: Robertson (16)

Palazzetto dello sport, Rome
Referees: E. Alvarez Frausto (Mexico)
T. Hata (Japan)

September 2
21:30

Uruguay	50–108	United States
Scoring by half: 19–65, 31–43
Pts: Chelle (12)		Pts: Smith (15)

Palazzetto dello sport, Rome
Referees: E. Alvarez Frausto (Mexico)
C. Sien (Singapore)

September 3
23:00

United States	81–57	Soviet Union
Scoring by half: 35–28, 46–29
Pts: West (19)		Pts: Zubkov (13)

Palazzetto dello sport, Rome
Referees: R. Weber (Switzerland)
B. Takev (Bulgaria)

Medal round
The United States' win over the Soviet Union and Brazil's victory over Italy carried over.

Pos	Team	Pld	W	L	PF	PA	PD	Pts
1	United States	3	3	0	283	201	+82	6
2	Soviet Union	3	2	1	199	213	−14	5
3	Brazil	3	1	2	203	229	−26	4
4	Italy (H)	3	0	3	226	268	−42	3

Source: FIBA archive
Rules for classification: 1) points; 2) head-to-head points; 3) head-to-head goal average; 4) head-to-head number of points scored.
(H) Hosts

September 8
21:00

Brazil	62–64	Soviet Union
Scoring by half: 32–28, 30–36
Pts: Marques (25)		Pts: Voljnov (19)

Palazzo dello Sport, Rome
Referees: R. Weber (Switzerland)
Bilek (Turkey)

September 10
22:30

Brazil	63–90	United States
Scoring by half: 24–50, 39–40
Pts: Marques (19)		Pts: Lucas (23)

Palazzo dello Sport, Rome
Referees: E. Alvarez Frausto (Mexico)
E. Kassai (Hungary)

== Boxing ==
Athlete	Event	Round of 64	Round of 32	Round of 16	Quarterfinal	Semifinal	Final	
Athlete	Event	Opposition Result	Opposition Result	Opposition Result	Opposition Result	Opposition Result	Opposition Result	Rank
Humberto Barrera	Flyweight	Bye	Andersen (DEN); W 4–0	Nyunt (BIR); W 3–2	El-Gindy (RAU); L 1–4	Did not advance		=5
Jerry Armstrong	Bantamweight	Petkov (BUL); W 5–0	Gang (KOR); W 4–1	Kenny (IRL); W 3–2	Zamparini (ITA); L 1–4	Did not advance		=5
Nick Spanakos	Featherweight	—N/a	Nikonorov (URS); L 0–5	Did not advance				=31
Harry Campbell	Lightweight	Bye	Romero (VEN); W 4–1	Lee (KOR); W KO	Lopopolo (ITA); L 1–4	Did not advance		=5
Quincey Daniels	Light welterweight	Bye	Mitsev (BUL); W 5–0	Kelsey (GBR); W 4–1	El-Nahas (UAR); W 5–0	Němeček (TCH); L 0–5	Did not advance	3rd place, bronze medalist(s)
Phil Baldwin	Welterweight	Bye	Grün (LUX); W KO	Meier (SUI); W 5–0	Lloyd (GBR); L 2–3	Did not advance		=5
Wilbert McClure	Light middleweight	—N/a	Bye	Nyangweso (UGA); W 5–0	Lima (ARG); W 3–2	Lagutin (URS); W 3–2	Bossi (ITA); W 4–1	1st place, gold medalist(s)
Eddie Crook Jr.	Middleweight	—N/a	Odreman (VEN); W KO	Odhiambo (UGA); W 5–0	Chang (ROC); W KO	Monea (ROU); W KO	Walasek (POL); W 3–2	1st place, gold medalist(s)
Cassius Clay	Light heavyweight	—N/a	Bye	Becaus (BEL); W RSC	Shatkov (URS); W 5–0	Madigan (AUS); W 5–0	Pietrzykowski (POL); W 5–0	1st place, gold medalist(s)
Percy Price Jr.	Heavyweight	—N/a	Bye	Taylor (AUS); W KO	Němec (TCH); L 1–4	Did not advance		=5

== Canoeing ==
Athlete	Event	Heat		Repechage		Semifinal		Final	
Athlete	Event	Time	Rank	Time	Rank	Time	Rank	Time	Rank
Frank Havens	Men's C-1 1000 m	5:19.40	7 R	5:13.34	4	Did not advance			
Arnold Demos; Richard Moran	Men's C-2 1000 m	4:59.15	5 R	DSQ		—N/a		Did not advance	
Paul Beachem	Men's K-1 1000 m	4:18.64	7 R	4:18.17	3 SF	4:15.10	5	Did not advance	
Kenneth Wilson; John Wolters	Men's K-2 1000 m	3:49.96	6 R	3:52.15	2 SF	4:01.06	6	Did not advance	
Russell Dermond; Charles Lundmark; Robert O'Brien; John Pagkos	Men's K-1 4 × 500 m	8:29.21	4 R	8:18.51	3	Did not advance			
Glorianne Perrier	Women's K-1 500 m	2:23.00	7 R	2:21.20	4	Did not advance			
Mary Ann DuChai; Diane Jerome	Women's K-2 500 m	2:15.51	5 R	2:21.13	5	—N/a		Did not advance	

Qualification Legend: FA - Qualify to final; SF - Qualify to semifinal; R - Qualify to repechage

== Cycling ==
14 cyclists represented the United States in 1960.

=== Road ===
Athlete	Event	Time	Rank
Wes Chowen	Road race	4:31:12	66
Michael Hiltner	Road race	4:20:57	24
Bob Tetzlaff	Road race	4:35:56	75
Lars Zebroski	Road race	4:28:40	64
Wes Chowen; Bill Freund; Michael Hiltner; Bob Tetzlaff	Team time trial	2:24:00.97	11

=== Track ===
Sprint / Tandem

Athlete	Event	Heat	Repechage 1	Repechage 2	Round of 16	Repechage 3	Repechage 4	Quarterfinal	Semifinal	Final / BM	
Athlete	Event	Opposition Result	Opposition Result	Opposition Result	Opposition Result	Opposition Result	Opposition Result	Opposition Result	Opposition Result	Opposition Result	Rank
Herbert Francis	Sprint	Gruchet (FRA), Ashiq (PAK); L	Baloch (PAK); W 12.1	van der Touw (NED), Rimple (BWI); L	Did not advance						=19
Jackie Simes	Sprint	Rieke (EUA), Nyman (FIN); L	de Graaf (NED); L	Did not advance							=22
Jack Hartman; David Sharp	Tandem	Hirzel / Vogel (SUI); W 11.3	Bye		—N/a			Beghetto / Bianchetto (ITA); L, L	Did not advance		=5

Pursuit

Athlete	Event	Elimination round		Quarterfinal	Semifinal	Final / BM	
Athlete	Event	Time	Rank	Opposition Result	Opposition Result	Opposition Result	Rank
Richard Cortright; Charles Hewett; Robert Pfarr; James Rossi	Team pursuit	4:49.92	16	Did not advance			16

Time trial

Athlete	Event	Time	Rank
Allen Bell	1000 m time trial	1:11.33	13

== Diving ==
Athlete	Event	Preliminary		Semifinal			Final		
Athlete	Event	Score	Rank	Score	Total	Rank	Score	Total	Rank
Sam Hall	Men's 3 m springboard	62.16	1 Q	45.33	107.49	1 Q	59.59	167.08	2nd place, silver medalist(s)
Gary Tobian	Men's 3 m springboard	62.03	2 Q	45.30	107.33	2 Q	62.64	170.00	1st place, gold medalist(s)
Gary Tobian	Men's 10 m platform	54.10	4 Q	51.98	106.08	1 Q	59.17	165.25	2nd place, silver medalist(s)
Bob Webster	Men's 10 m platform	52.21	9 Q	47.51	99.72	3 Q	65.84	165.56	1st place, gold medalist(s)
Paula Jean Myers-Pope	Women's 3 m springboard	52.67	2 Q	37.35	90.02	4 Q	51.22	141.24	2nd place, silver medalist(s)
Patsy Willard	Women's 3 m springboard	50.64	8 Q	38.14	88.78	7 Q	49.04	137.82	4
Paula Jean Myers-Pope	Women's 10 m platform	54.70	2 Q	—N/a			35.24	89.94	2nd place, silver medalist(s)
Juno Stover-Irwin	Women's 10 m platform	51.90	6 Q	—N/a			31.69	83.59	4

== Equestrian ==
=== Dressage ===
Athlete	Horse	Event	Round 1		Round 2		Total	
Athlete	Horse	Event	Score	Rank	Score	Rank	Score	Rank
Patricia Galvin	Rathpatrick	Individual	995	6	Did not advance			
Jessica Newberry-Ransehousen	Forstrat	Individual	927	12	Did not advance			

=== Eventing ===
Athlete	Horse	Event	Dressage		Cross-country			Jumping		
Athlete	Horse	Event	Penalties	Rank	Penalties	Total	Rank	Penalties	Total	Rank
David Lurie	Sea Tiger	Individual	-142.00	52	Did not advance					
Michael Page	Grasshopper	Individual	-137.50	45 Q	-24.80	-162.30	22 Q	-10	-172.30	17
J. Michael Plumb	Markham	Individual	-120.51	26 Q	-29.20	-149.71	17 Q	-3.25	-152.96	15
Walter Staley	Fleet Captain	Individual	-146.01	56	Did not advance					
David Lurie; Michael Page; J. Michael Plumb; Walter Staley	See above	Team	-400.01	14	Did not advance					

=== Jumping ===
Athlete	Horse	Event	Round 1				Round 2				Total	
Athlete	Horse	Event	Penalties	Time	Total	Rank	Penalties	Time	Total	Rank	Penalties	Rank
George H. Morris	Sinjon	Individual	12	0	12	=5	12	0	12	=3	24	4
William Steinkraus	Riviera Wonder	Individual	21	3	24	=27	11	2.5	13.5	10	37.50	15
Hugh Wiley	Master William	Individual	12	0	12	=5	16	0	16	=12	28	7
Frank Chapot; George H. Morris; William Steinkraus	Trail Guide; Sinjon; Ksar d'Esprit	Team	—N/a		29	2	—N/a		37	2	66	2nd place, silver medalist(s)

== Fencing ==
19 fencers represented the United States in 1960.

Individual
Men

Athlete	Event	Round 1		Barrage 1		Round 2		Barrage 2		Quarterfinal		Barrage 3		Semifinal		Barrage 4		Final		Medal barrage	
Athlete	Event	W–L	Rank	W–L	Rank	W–L	Rank	W–L	Rank	W–L	Rank	W–L	Rank	W–L	Rank	W–L	Rank	W–L	Rank	W–L	Rank
Albert Axelrod	Foil	3–2	3 Q	—N/a		3–1	3 Q	—N/a		4–1	1 Q	Bye		3–2	1 Q	Bye		3–3	=3 B	2–0	3rd place, bronze medalist(s)
Eugene Glazer	Foil	4–2	3 Q	—N/a		2–3	4 B	2–1	2 Q	1–4	5	Did not advance									=17
Joseph Paletta Jr.	Foil	3–2	3 Q	—N/a		1–3	5	Did not advance													=25
James Margolis	Épée	4–2	4 B	0–1	2	Did not advance															=37
David Micahnik	Épée	4–2	3 Q	—N/a		1–4	6	—N/a		Did not advance											=31
Ralph Spinella	Épée	2–3	4 B	1–4	2	Did not advance															=37
Michael D'Asaro Sr.	Sabre	4–1	2 Q	—N/a		4–1	3 Q	—N/a		1–3	5	—N/a		Did not advance							=17
Allan Kwartler	Sabre	4–1	1 Q	Bye		3–2	3 Q	Bye		0–4	6	—N/a		Did not advance							=21
Alfonso Morales	Sabre	3–2	3 B	1–0	1 Q	2–2	4 Q	—N/a		0–5	6	—N/a		Did not advance							=21

Women

Athlete	Event	Round 1		Barrage 1		Quarterfinal		Barrage 2		Semifinal		Final		Medal barrage	
Athlete	Event	W–L	Rank	W–L	Rank	W–L	Rank	W–L	Rank	W–L	Rank	W–L	Rank	W–L	Rank
Harriet King	Foil	2–4	6	—N/a		Did not advance									=46
Evelyn Terhune	Foil	3–2	=2 B	0–2	3	Did not advance									=28
Janice York-Romary	Foil	3–2	=3 B	0–1	2	Did not advance									=28

Team

Athlete	Event	Round 1		Round of 16	Quarterfinal	Semifinal	Final / BM	
Athlete	Event	W–L	Rank	Opposition Result	Opposition Result	Opposition Result	Opposition Result	Rank
Albert Axelrod; Daniel Bukantz; Eugene Glazer; Hal Goldsmith; Joseph Paletta Jr.	Men's foil	2–0	1 Q	Luxembourg; W 9–5	Italy; L 0–9	Did not advance		=5
Henry Kolowrat Jr. James Margolis; David Micahnik; Ralph Spinella; Roland Wommack	Men's épée	1–1	2 Q	Great Britain; L 5–9	Did not advance			=9
Michael D'Asaro Sr. Allan Kwartler; Alfonso Morales; George Worth	Men's sabre	2–0	1 Q	Austria; W 9–5	Soviet Union; W 8–8	Poland; L 3–9	Bronze medal final Italy; L 6–9	4
Judy Goodrich; Harriet King; Maxine Mitchell; Evelyn Terhune; Janice York-Romary	Women's foil	0.5–1.5	3	—N/a	Did not advance			=9

== Gymnastics ==
Men
All-around

Athlete	Event	Apparatus																								Total	
Athlete	Event	Floor exercise				Rings				Pommel horse				Vault				Parallel bars				Horizontal bar				Total	
Athlete	Event	C	V	Total	Rank	C	V	Total	Rank	C	V	Total	Rank	C	V	Total	Rank	C	V	Total	Rank	C	V	Total	Rank	Score	Rank
Larry Banner	Individual	9.10	9.20	18.30	39	9.50	9.30	18.80	21	9.50	9.50	19.00	8	9.05	9.30	18.35	28	~~9.10~~	~~9.00~~	18.10	60	9.10	9.40	18.50	38	111.05	21
Jack Beckner	Individual	9.20	9.15	18.35	35	~~9.10~~	9.15	18.25	55	9.40	9.30	18.70	18	8.90	9.20	18.10	46	9.45	9.25	18.70	26	9.25	9.50	18.75	22	110.85	25
Abie Grossfeld	Individual	~~8.85~~	9.45	18.30	39	9.35	9.40	18.75	25	~~8.95~~	~~8.80~~	17.75	76	8.90	~~8.95~~	17.85	63	9.25	9.20	18.45	37	9.30	9.65	18.95	15	110.05	36
Gar O'Quinn	Individual	9.15	9.15	18.30	39	9.40	~~8.20~~	17.60	88	9.30	9.45	18.75	15	~~8.75~~	9.15	17.90	61	9.15	9.15	18.30	50	~~8.95~~	9.20	18.15	61	109.00	53
Fred Orlofsky	Individual	8.90	~~9.00~~	17.90	75	9.45	9.15	18.60	36	9.10	9.40	18.50	33	9.20	9.35	18.55	17	9.30	9.15	18.45	37	9.15	~~8.30~~	17.45	91	109.45	44
Don Tonry	Individual	9.10	9.40	18.50	26	9.20	9.00	18.20	59	9.25	9.35	18.60	26	9.20	9.25	18.45	20	9.30	9.15	18.45	37	9.05	9.50	18.55	33	110.75	27
See above	Team	45.45	46.35	—N/a		46.90	46.00	—N/a		46.55	47.00	—N/a		45.25	46.25	—N/a		46.45	45.90	—N/a		45.85	47.25	—N/a		555.20	5

Women
All-around

Athlete	Event	Apparatus																Total	
Athlete	Event	Floor exercise				Balance beam				Uneven bars				Vault				Total	
Athlete	Event	C	V	Total	Rank	C	V	Total	Rank	C	V	Total	Rank	C	V	Total	Rank	Score	Rank
Doris Fuchs	Individual	8.866	~~9.200~~	18.066	68	9.066	8.400	17.466	55	9.400	9.600	19.000	8	9.066	8.900	17.966	39	72.498	39
Muriel Grossfeld	Individual	9.466	9.400	18.866	19	8.900	~~8.200~~	17.100	66	9.233	~~7.733~~	16.966	91	~~8.400~~	~~8.800~~	17.200	69	70.132	70
Betty-Jean Maycock	Individual	~~8.833~~	9.366	18.199	61	8.600	9.166	17.766	49	9.066	9.066	18.132	50	8.633	9.200	17.833	51	71.930	51
Teri Montefusco	Individual	8.866	9.400	18.266	54	8.533	9.166	17.699	50	~~8.566~~	9.266	17.832	65	8.633	8.933	17.566	55	71.363	58
Sharon Richardson	Individual	9.033	9.300	18.333	51	~~8.366~~	9.233	17.599	53	8.600	9.066	17.666	71	9.200	9.333	18.533	9	72.131	44
Gail Sontgerath	Individual	9.333	9.333	18.666	28	9.000	9.333	18.333	21	9.066	8.900	17.966	58	9.166	8.966	18.132	26	73.097	28
See above	Team	45.564	46.799	—N/a		44.099	45.298	—N/a		45.898	45.898	—N/a		44.698	45.332	—N/a		363.053	9

== Modern pentathlon ==
Three pentathletes represented the United States in 1960. They won a bronze medal in the team event and Bob Beck won an individual bronze.

Athlete	Event	Riding Cross-country steeplechase			Fencing Épée one touch			Shooting 10 m air pistol			Swimming 300 m freestyle			Running 4000 m cross-country			Total	
Athlete	Event	Time	Rank	MP points	V–D	Rank	MP points	Score	Rank	MP points	Time	Rank	MP points	Time	Rank	MP points	Points	Rank
Robert Beck	Individual			1039			977			940			1010			1015	4981	3rd place, bronze medalist(s)
Jack Daniels	Individual			1024			793			900			1015			985	4717	8
George Lambert	Individual			1165			678			740			975			982	4540	18
Robert Beck; Jack Daniels; George Lambert	Team	—N/a		3228	—N/a		2402	—N/a		2580	—N/a		3000	—N/a		2982	14192	3rd place, bronze medalist(s)

== Rowing ==
The United States had 26 rowers participate in all seven rowing events in 1960.

Athlete	Event	Heat		Repechage		Semifinal		Final	
Athlete	Event	Time	Rank	Time	Rank	Time	Rank	Time	Rank
Harry Parker	Single sculls	7:26.88	3 R	7:29.86	1 FA	—N/a		7:29.26	5
Ted Frost; Bob Rogers	Coxless pair	7:07.75	2 R	7:14.16	1 SF	7:31.11	3 FA	7:17.08	5
Richard Draeger; Conn Findlay; Kent Mitchell (c)	Coxed pair	7:39.50	2 R	7:39.00	1 FA	—N/a		7:34.58	3rd place, bronze medalist(s)
Jack Kelly Jr. Bill Knecht	Double sculls	6:51.92	4 R	6:55.25	4	—N/a		Did not advance	
Dan Ayrault; Ted Nash; John Sayre; Rusty Wailes	Coxless four	6:29.67	2 R	6:24.84	1 FA	—N/a		6:26.26	1st place, gold medalist(s)
Chuck Alm; Roy Rubin; Kurt Seiffert (c); Monte Stocker; Mike Yonker	Coxed four	6:49.62	2 R	6:49.78	1 SF	7:06.25	4	Did not advance	
Joe Baldwin; Peter Bos; William Long (c); Mark Moore; Lyman S. Perry; Skip Sweetser; Gayle Thompson; Robert Wilson; Howard Winfree	Eight	6:07.69	2 R	6:31.77	1 FA	—N/a		6:08.06	5

Qualification legend: FA - Qualify to final; SF - Qualify to semifinal; R - Qualify to repechage

== Sailing ==
Athlete	Event	Race 1		Race 2		Race 3		Race 4		Race 5		Race 6		Race 7		Total	
Athlete	Event	Rank	Points	Rank	Points	Rank	Points	Rank	Points	Rank	Points	Rank	Points	Rank	Points	Points	Rank
Peter Jones Barrett	Finn	~~DNF~~	~~101~~	17	415	7	800	11	604	6	867	20	344	5	946	3976	11
Harry Sindle; Robert Wood	Flying Dutchman	~~DNF~~	~~101~~	6	814	15	416	10	592	27	161	17	362	18	337	2682	19
William Parks; Robert Halperin	Star	~~9~~	~~562~~	7	671	4	914	3	1039	2	1215	4	914	1	1516	6269	3rd place, bronze medalist(s)
Claude Kohler; Allen McClure; Gene Walet III	Dragon	7	687	6	754	14	386	10	532	~~17~~	~~302~~	4	930	12	453	3742	10
James Hunt; George O'Day; David Smith	5.5 Meter	2	1079	4	778	1	1380	3	903	1	1380	~~7~~	~~535~~	1	1380	6900	1st place, gold medalist(s)

== Shooting ==
Nine shooters represented the United States in 1960. Bill McMillan won gold in the 25 m pistol and Jim Hill won silver in the 50 m rifle, prone.

Athlete	Event	Qualification		Final		Shoot-off	
Athlete	Event	Score	Rank	Score	Rank	Score	Rank
William McMillan	25 m rapid fire pistol	—N/a		587	=1	147	1st place, gold medalist(s)
Laurence Mosely	25 m rapid fire pistol	—N/a		577	16	Did not advance	
John Hurst	50 m pistol	350	10 Q	538	17	—N/a	
Nelson Lincoln	50 m pistol	360	4 Q	543	9	—N/a	
James Enoch Hill	50 m rifle, prone	390	4 Q	589	2nd place, silver medalist(s)	—N/a	
Daniel Puckel	50 m rifle, prone	387	10 Q	585	7	—N/a	
James Enoch Hill	50 m rifle, three position	561	4 Q	1115	24	—N/a	
Daniel Puckel	50 m rifle, three position	560	5 Q	1136	7	—N/a	
John Foster	300 m rifle, three position	1121	4 Q	1121	7	—N/a	
Daniel Puckel	300 m rifle, three position	566	3 Q	1114	10	—N/a	
James Clark	Trap	90	=14 Q	188	4	—N/a	
Arnold Riegger	Trap	87	=28 Q	168	30	—N/a	

== Swimming ==
Men

Athlete	Event	Heat		Semifinal		Final	
Athlete	Event	Time	Rank	Time	Rank	Time	Rank
Bruce Hunter	100 m freestyle	56.6	8 Q	55.7	2 Q	55.6	4
Lance Larson	100 m freestyle	55.7	1 Q	55.5	1 Q	55.2 OR	2nd place, silver medalist(s)
Gene Lenz	400 m freestyle	4:29.2	8 Q	—N/a		4:26.8	7
Alan Somers	400 m freestyle	4:19.2	1 Q	—N/a		4:22.0	5
George Breen	1500 m freestyle	17:55.9	7 Q	—N/a		17:30.6	3rd place, bronze medalist(s)
Alan Somers	1500 m freestyle	17:54.1	5 Q	—N/a		18:02.8	7
Bob Bennett	100 m backstroke	1:02.0	1 Q	1:03.7	3 Q	1:02.3	3rd place, bronze medalist(s)
Frank McKinney	100 m backstroke	1:02.4	2 Q	1:03.8	=4 Q	1:02.1	2nd place, silver medalist(s)
Paul Hait	200 m breaststroke	2:40.8	5 Q	2:39.6	6 Q	2:41.4	8
Bill Mulliken	200 m breaststroke	2:38.0	1 Q	2:37.2	1 Q	2:37.4	1st place, gold medalist(s)
Dave Gillanders	200 m butterfly	2:16.2	2 Q	2:18.7	2 Q	2:15.3	3rd place, bronze medalist(s)
Mike Troy	200 m butterfly	2:15.5	1 Q	2:18.0	1 Q	2:12.8 WR	1st place, gold medalist(s)
Dick Blick; Steve Clark^{[b]} Bill Darnton^{[b]} Jeff Farrell; George Harrison; Mike Troy; Tom Winters^{[b]}	4 × 200 m freestyle relay	8:18.0	2 Q	—N/a		8:10.2 WR	1st place, gold medalist(s)
Bob Bennett^{[b]} Steve Clark^{[b]} Jeff Farrell; Dave Gillanders^{[b]} Paul Hait; Lance Larson; Frank McKinney	4 × 100 m medley relay	4:08.2 WR	1 Q	—N/a		4:05.4 WR	1st place, gold medalist(s)

Women

Athlete	Event	Heat		Semifinal		Final	
Athlete	Event	Time	Rank	Time	Rank	Time	Rank
Chris von Saltza	100 m freestyle	1:01.9	1 Q	1:02.5	2 Q	1:02.8	2nd place, silver medalist(s)
Carolyn Wood	100 m freestyle	1:04.3	6 Q	1:04.2	7 Q	1:03.4	4
Carolyn House	400 m freestyle	5:00.7	10	—N/a		Did not advance	
Chris von Saltza	400 m freestyle	4:53.6	1 Q	—N/a		4:50.6 OR	1st place, gold medalist(s)
Lynn Burke	100 m backstroke	1:09.4	1 Q	—N/a		1:09.3 OR	1st place, gold medalist(s)
Nina Harmer	100 m backstroke	1:13.8	=11	—N/a		Did not advance	
Patty Kempner	200 m breaststroke	2:55.5	6 Q	—N/a		2:55.5	7
Anne Warner	200 m breaststroke	2:56.3	8 Q	—N/a		2:55.4	6
Carolyn Schuler	100 m butterfly	1:09.8	1 Q	—N/a		1:09.5 OR	1st place, gold medalist(s)
Carolyn Wood	100 m butterfly	1:11.1	4 Q	—N/a		DNF	
Molly Botkin^{[b]} Donna de Varona^{[b]} Susan Doerr^{[b]} Sylvia Ruuska^{[b]} Joan Spillane; Shirley Stobs; Chris von Saltza; Carolyn Wood	4 × 100 m freestyle relay	4:18.9	2 Q	—N/a		4:08.9 WR	1st place, gold medalist(s)
Lynn Burke; Patty Kempner; Carolyn Schuler; Joan Spillane^{[b]} Chris von Saltza; Anne Warner^{[b]} Carolyn Wood^{[b]}	4 × 100 m medley relay	4:49.3	3 Q	—N/a		4:41.1 WR	1st place, gold medalist(s)

^{b} Swimmers who participated in the heats only.

== Weightlifting ==
Athlete	Event	Weight	Rank
Charles Vinci	56 kg	345.0	1st place, gold medalist(s)
Issac Berger	60 kg	362.5	2nd place, silver medalist(s)
Tommy Kono	75 kg	427.5	2nd place, silver medalist(s)
Jim George	82.5 kg	430.0	2nd place, silver medalist(s)
John Pulskamp	90 kg	432.5	4
James Bradford	+90 kg	512.5	2nd place, silver medalist(s)
Norbert Schemansky	+90 kg	500.0	3rd place, bronze medalist(s)

== Wrestling ==
Key:

- TF – Victory by fall.
- WO - Win by Walkover
- PP - Win by technical points

Athlete	Event	Elimination stage								Final stage			
Athlete	Event	Opposition Result (Penalty points)	Opposition Result (Penalty points)	Opposition Result (Penalty points)	Opposition Result (Penalty points)	Opposition Result (Penalty points)	Opposition Result (Penalty points)	Opposition Result (Penalty points)	TPP	Opposition Result (Penalty points)	Opposition Result (Penalty points)	FPP	Rank
Gray Simons	Freestyle flyweight	Frännfors (SWE); W TF (0)	Bilek (TUR); L TF (4)	Rosado (MEX); W TF (0)	Aliev (URS); W PP (1)	Matsubara (JPN); L PP (3)	EL		8	—N/a			5
Terrence McCann	Freestyle bantamweight	Vesterby (SWE); W PP (1)	Hänni (SUI); W TF (0)	Campbell (PAN); W PP (1)	Jaskari (FIN); L PP (3)	Shakov (URS); W TF (0)	—N/a		5	Trojanowski (POL); W PP (1)	Zalev (BUL); W PP (1)	2	1st place, gold medalist(s)
Louis Giani	Freestyle featherweight	Gelsomini (ITA); W TF (0)	Khadem (IRI); L TF (4)	Sayed (IRQ); W PP (1)	EL			—N/a	5	—N/a			9
Shelby Wilson	Freestyle lightweight	Gian (IND); W PP (1)	Peltoniemi (FIN); W PP (1)	Abe (JPN); W PP (1)	Sinyavsky (URS); W PP (1)	Bye	Tajik (IRI); W PP (1)	—N/a	5	—N/a			1st place, gold medalist(s)
Douglas Blubaugh	Freestyle welterweight	Boese (CAN); W TF (0)	Bruggmann (SUI); W TF (0)	Rolón (ARG); W WO (0)	Carlsson (SWE); W TF (0)	Habibi (IRI); W TF (0)	—N/a		0	Ogan (TUR); W PP (1)	Bashir (PAK); W TF (0)	1	1st place, gold medalist(s)
Ed DeWitt	Freestyle middleweight	Caraffini (ITA); W PP (1)	Mottier (SUI); W TF (0)	Skhirtladze (URS); W PP (1)	Utz (EUA); W PP (1)	Güngör (TUR); L TF (4)	—N/a		7	—N/a			4
Daniel Brand	Freestyle light heavyweight	Jacquel (FRA); W TF (0)	Kawano (JPN); L TF (4)	van Zyl (SAF); W TF (0)	Bye	Albul (URS); L PP (3)	EL	—N/a	7	—N/a			5
William Kerslake	Freestyle heavyweight	Reznák (HUN); L PP (3)	Richmond (GBR); W TF (0)	Ahmedov (BUL); T (2)	Kaplan (TUR); L PP (3)	EL		—N/a	8	—N/a			8
Dick Wilson	Greco-Roman flyweight	Pârvulescu (ROU); L PP (3)	Kochergin (URS); T (2)	Burkhard (SUI); W TF (0)	Hirata (JPN); L TF (4)	EL	—N/a		9	—N/a			9
Larry Lauchle	Greco-Roman bantamweight	Ichiguchi (JPN); L TF (4)	Yılmaz (TUR); L TF (4)	EL				—N/a	8	—N/a			=25
Lee Allen	Greco-Roman featherweight	Gregório (POR); W TF (0)	Mahassine (MAR); W PP (1)	Ebrahimian (IRI); L PP (3)	Tóth (TCH); L PP (3)	EL			7	—N/a			8
Ben Northrup	Greco-Roman lightweight	Lehtonen (FIN); L PP (3)	Koridze (URS); L PP (3)	EL				—N/a	6	—N/a			=17
Fritz Fivian	Greco-Roman welterweight	Maritschnigg (EUA); L PP (3)	Petkov (BUL); L PP (3)	EL				—N/a	6	EL			=20
Russell Camilleri	Greco-Roman middleweight	Berthoud (SUI); W PP (1)	Längle (AUT); W TF (0)	Romanos (LIB); T (2)	Metz (EUA); L TF (4)	EL		—N/a	6	—N/a	EL		7
Howard George	Greco-Roman light heavyweight	Kartozia (URS); L PP (3)	Albrecht (EUA); L PP (3)	EL				—N/a	6	—N/a			=12
Dale Lewis	Greco-Roman heavyweight	Kozma (HUN); L PP (3)	Bulgarelli (ITA); L TF (4)	EL		—N/a			7	—N/a			11

== See also ==
- United States at the 1959 Pan American Games
- United States at the 1960 Summer Paralympics
