= Turkey at the 1960 Summer Olympics =

- IOC code: TUR
- NOC: Turkish National Olympic Committee

in Rome
- Competitors: 49 in 6 sports
- Flag bearer: Nuri Turan
- Medals Ranked 6th: Gold 7 Silver 2 Bronze 0 Total 9

Summer Olympics appearances (overview)
- 1908; 1912; 1920; 1924; 1928; 1932; 1936; 1948; 1952; 1956; 1960; 1964; 1968; 1972; 1976; 1980; 1984; 1988; 1992; 1996; 2000; 2004; 2008; 2012; 2016; 2020; 2024

Other related appearances
- 1906 Intercalated Games

Turkey competed at the 1960 Summer Olympics in Rome, Italy.

== Medalists ==
| Medal | Name | Sport | Event |
|---|---|---|---|
| Gold | Müzahir Sille | Wrestling | Men's Greco-Roman Featherweight |
| Gold | Mithat Bayrak | Wrestling | Men's Greco-Roman Welterweight |
| Gold | Tevfik Kis | Wrestling | Men's Greco-Roman Light Heavyweight |
| Gold | Ahmet Bilek | Wrestling | Men's Freestyle Flyweight |
| Gold | Mustafa Dagistanli | Wrestling | Freestyle Featherweight |
| Gold | Hasan Güngör | Wrestling | Freestyle Middleweight |
| Gold | Ismet Atli | Wrestling | Freestyle Light Heavyweight |
| Silver | Ismail Ogan | Wrestling | Freestyle Welterweight |
| Silver | Hamit Kaplan | Wrestling | Freestyle Heavyweight |

== Competitors ==
| Sport | Men | Women | Total |
|---|---|---|---|
| Athletics | 10 | 3 | 13 |
| Equestrian | 3 | | 3 |
| Football | 14 | | 14 |
| Wrestling | 16 | | 16 |
| Sailing | 1 | | 1 |
| Swimming | 2 | | 2 |
| Total | 46 | 3 | 49 |

== Swimming ==
Men

| Athlete | Event | Heat | | Semifinal | | Final | |
| Athlete | Event | Time | Rank | Time | Rank | Time | Rank |
|---|---|---|---|---|---|---|---|
| Ünsal Fikirci | 100 m freestyle | 1:03.0 | =46 | Did not advance | | | |
| Ünsal Fikirci | 100 m backstroke | 1:15.2 | 36 | Did not advance | | | |
| Engin Ünal | 200 m breaststroke | 2:49.0 | 27 | Did not advance | | | |

== Wrestling ==
Men's freestyle

| Athlete | Event | First round | Second round | Third round | Fourth round | Fifth round | Sixth round | Final round | Rank |
|---|---|---|---|---|---|---|---|---|---|
| Ahmet Bilek | 52 kg | Matsubara (JPN); W Points | Simons (USA); W Fall | Aliyev (URS); W Points | Nawab (PAK); W Fall | Neff (EUA); W Fall | Seifpour (IRI); W Points | | 1st place, gold medalist(s) |
| Hüseyin Akbaş | 57 kg | Yaghoubi (IRI); D Points | Shakhov (URS); L Points | Jaskari (FIN); L Fall | Did not advance | | | | 14 |
| Mustafa Dağıstanlı | 62 kg | Penttilä (FIN); W Points | Marte (AUT); W Fall | Kellermann (HUN); W Fall | Mewis (BEL); W Points | Akhtar (PAK); W Fall | Sato (JPN); D Points | Kolev (BUL); W Points | 1st place, gold medalist(s) |
| Hayrullah Şahin | 67 kg | Stamulus (AUS); W Fall | Tajiki (IRI); L Points | Nizzola (ITA); D Points | Did not advance | | | | 8 |
| İsmail Ogan | 73 kg | Balavadze (URS); W Points | Heinze (EUA); W Points | Chand (IND); W Fall | Villiers (RSA); W Points | Kaneko (JPN); W Points | Bashir (PAK); W Points | Blubaugh (USA); L Points | 2nd place, silver medalist(s) |
| Hasan Güngör | 79 kg | Graffigna (ARG); W Fall | Gardzhev (BUL); W Points | Mahdizadeh (IRI); D Points | Hollósi (HUN); W Points | | | DeWitt (USA); W Fall | 1st place, gold medalist(s) |
| İsmet Atlı | 87 kg | Kostov (BUL); W Points | Steckle (CAN); W Points | Holzherr (SUI); W Points | Albul (URS); W Points | Palm (SWE); W Points | | Takhti (IRI); W Points | 1st place, gold medalist(s) |
| Hamit Kaplan | +87 kg | Sosnowski (POL); W Fall | Akhmedov (BUL); D Points | Nazir (PAK); W Fall | Kerslake (USA); W Points | Dzarasov (URS); D Points | | Dietrich (EUA); D Points | 2nd place, silver medalist(s) |

Men's Greco-Roman

| Athlete | Event | First round | Second round | Third round | Fourth round | Fifth round | Sixth round | Final round | Rank |
|---|---|---|---|---|---|---|---|---|---|
| Kazim Gedik | 52 kg | Kochergin (URS); L Fall | Pârvulescu (ROU); L Fall | Did not advance | | | | | 17 |
| Yaşar Yılmaz | 57 kg | El-Sayed (UAR); W Points | Lauchle (USA); W Fall | Dubier (FRA); W Points | Ichiguchi (JPN); L Points | | | Petrov (BUL); D Points | 5 |
| Müzahir Sille | 62 kg | Neumair (EUA); W Points | Macioch (POL); W Points | Freij (SWE); W Fall | Mansour (UAR); W Fall | Şulţ (ROU); L Points | | Polyák (HUN); W Points | 1st place, gold medalist(s) |
| Adil Güngör | 67 kg | Seger (EUA); W Points | Brötzner (AUT); D Points | Gondzik (POL); D Points | Gheorghe (ROU); D Points | Did not advance | | | 5 |
| Mithat Bayrak | 73 kg | Horvat (YUG); W Points | Berger (AUT); W Fall | Nyström (SWE); W Points | Rizmayer (HUN); W Points | Hamarnik (URS); D Points | Maritschnigg (EUA); W Fall | Schiermeyer (FRA); W Points | 1st place, gold medalist(s) |
| Kazım Ayvaz | 79 kg | Magnani (ITA); W Points | Schummer (LUX); W Fall | Hazrati (IRI); W Points | Kormaník (TCH); W Fall | Dubicki (POL); D Points | Dobrev (BUL); L Points | Ţăranu (ROU); L Points | 4 |
| Tevfik Kış | 87 kg | Rusterholz (SUI); W Points | Bimbalov (BUL); D Points | Smoliński (POL); W Points | Bye | Vanhanen (FIN); W Points | | Kartozia (URS); W Points | 1st place, gold medalist(s) |
| Tan Tarı | +87 kg | Bohdan (URS); L Fall | Svensson (SWE); D Points | Did not advance | | | | | 9 |
