= Ali Hussain =

Ali Hussain or Ali Hossain may refer to:

== People ==
- Ali Hossain (1940–2021), Bangladeshi composer
- Ali Hossaini (born 1962), American artist, philosopher, theatrical producer, television producer, and businessperson
- Ali Hossain (politician), Indian politician
- Ali Hossain Mia (born 1936/37), Bangladeshi politician
- Ali Hassain Hussain (born 1935), Iraqi weightlifter
- Ali Hussain (cricketer) (born 1979), Pakistani cricketer
- Ali Hussain (footballer) (born 1985), Emirati footballer
- Ali Hussain Al-Awadhi (born 1974), Kuwaiti journalist and politician
- Ali Hussain Faris (born 1957), Iraqi wrestler
- Ali Hussain Khan (1956–2026), Pakistani politician
- Ali Hussain Rizvi (born 1974), Pakistani cricketer
- Ali Hussain Sibat, Lebanese talk show host

== Places ==
- Ali Hoseyn, Khuzestan, Iran
- Ali Hoseyn, alternate name of Salanjeh Zaruni, Lorestan, Iran

== See also ==
- Ali Hoseyni, village in Bushehr province, Iran
