= Wrestling at the 1960 Summer Olympics =

Wrestling at the Games of the XVII Olympiad
- Venue: Basilica of Maxentius
- Dates: 26 August – 6 September
- Competitors: 324 from 42 nations

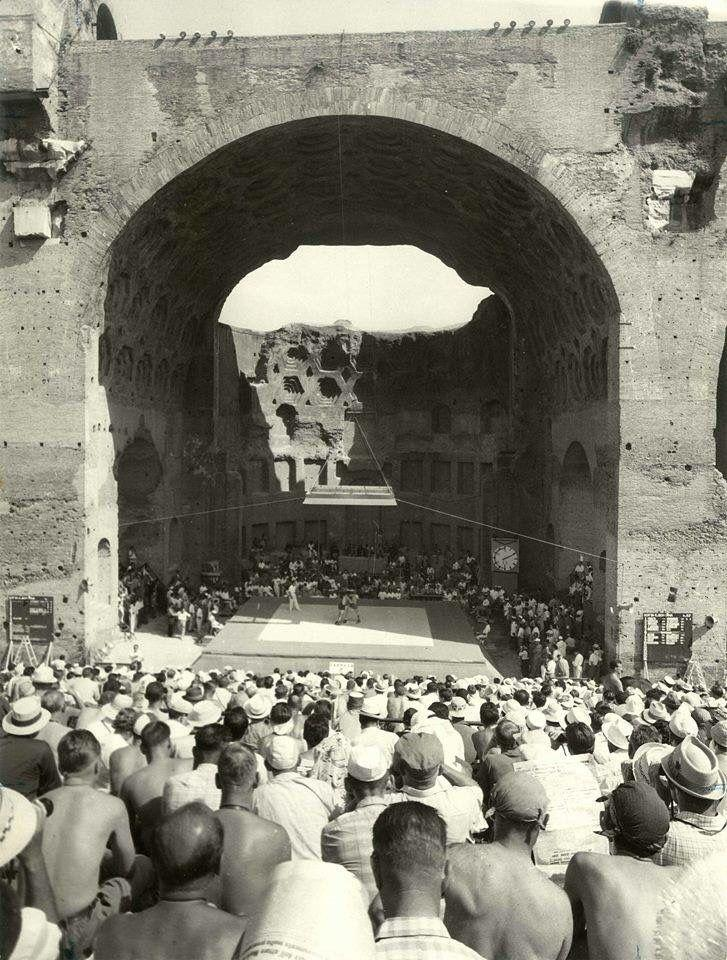
Wrestlers in the Basilica di Massenzio

At the 1960 Summer Olympics, 16 wrestling events were contested, all for men. There were eight weight classes in Greco-Roman wrestling and eight classes in freestyle wrestling.

== Medal table ==
Rank	Nation	Gold	Silver	Bronze	Total
1	Turkey	7	2	0	9
2	Soviet Union	3	2	5	10
3	United States	3	0	0	3
4	Bulgaria	1	3	2	6
5	United Team of Germany	1	3	0	4
6	Romania	1	1	1	3
7	Iran	0	1	2	3
8	Egypt	0	1	0	1
8	Hungary	0	1	0	1
8	Japan	0	1	0	1
8	Yugoslavia	0	1	0	1
12	Sweden	0	0	2	2
13	Czechoslovakia	0	0	1	1
13	France	0	0	1	1
13	Pakistan	0	0	1	1
13	Poland	0	0	1	1
Totals (16 entries)		16	16	16	48

== Medal summary ==
=== Men's freestyle ===
Games	Gold	Silver	Bronze
Flyweight	Ahmet Bilek; Turkey	Masayuki Matsubara; Japan	Ebrahim Seifpour; Iran
Bantamweight	Terrence McCann; United States	Nezhdet Zalev; Bulgaria	Tadeusz Trojanowski; Poland
Featherweight	Mustafa Dağıstanlı; Turkey	Stancho Kolev; Bulgaria	Vladimir Rubashvili; Soviet Union
Lightweight	Shelby Wilson; United States	Vladimir Synyavsky; Soviet Union	Enyu Valchev; Bulgaria
Welterweight	Douglas Blubaugh; United States	İsmail Ogan; Turkey	Muhammad Bashir; Pakistan
Middleweight	Hasan Güngör; Turkey	Georgy Skhirtladze; Soviet Union	Hans Antonsson; Sweden
Light heavyweight	İsmet Atlı; Turkey	Gholamreza Takhti; Iran	Anatoli Albul; Soviet Union
Heavyweight	Wilfried Dietrich; United Team of Germany	Hamit Kaplan; Turkey	Savkuds Dzarasov; Soviet Union

=== Men's Greco-Roman ===
Games	Gold	Silver	Bronze
Flyweight	Dumitru Pârvulescu; Romania	Osman El-Sayed; Egypt	Mohammad Paziraei; Iran
Bantamweight	Oleg Karavayev; Soviet Union	Ion Cernea; Romania	Dinko Petrov; Bulgaria
Featherweight	Müzahir Sille; Turkey	Imre Polyák; Hungary	Konstantin Vyrupayev; Soviet Union
Lightweight	Avtandil Koridze; Soviet Union	Branislav Martinović; Yugoslavia	Gustav Freij; Sweden
Welterweight	Mithat Bayrak; Turkey	Günther Maritschnigg; United Team of Germany	René Schiermeyer; France
Middleweight	Dimitar Dobrev; Bulgaria	Lothar Metz; United Team of Germany	Ion Țăranu; Romania
Light Heavyweight	Tevfik Kış; Turkey	Krali Bimbalov; Bulgaria	Givi Kartoziya; Soviet Union
Heavyweight	Ivan Bogdan; Soviet Union	Wilfried Dietrich; United Team of Germany	Bohumil Kubát; Czechoslovakia

== Participating nations ==
324 wrestlers from 42 countries participated.

1. Afghanistan (7)
2. Argentina (3)
3. Australia (9)
4. Austria (7)
5. Belgium (5)
6. Bulgaria (16)
7. Czechoslovakia (5)
8. Denmark (4)
9. Egypt (4)
10. Finland (14)
11. France (9)
12. United Team of Germany (15)
13. Great Britain (6)
14. Greece (3)
15. Hungary (10)
16. India (5)
17. Iran (12)
18. Iraq (1)
19. Ireland (4)
20. Italy (16)
21. Japan (16)
22. South Korea (4)
23. Lebanon (6)
24. Luxembourg (4)
25. Mexico (4)
26. Morocco (5)
27. Netherlands (3)
28. New Zealand (1)
29. Norway (4)
30. Pakistan (7)
31. Panama (1)
32. Poland (12)
33. Portugal (3)
34. Romania (7)
35. Soviet Union (16)
36. Spain (4)
37. Sweden (12)
38. Switzerland (12)
39. Turkey (16)
40. United States (16)
41. Venezuela (2)
42. Yugoslavia (5)

== See also ==
- List of World and Olympic Champions in men's freestyle wrestling
- List of World and Olympic Champions in Greco-Roman wrestling
