= Wrestling at the 1960 Summer Olympics – Men's freestyle flyweight =

Wrestling at the Olympics

Men's freestyle flyweight at the Games of the XVII Olympiad
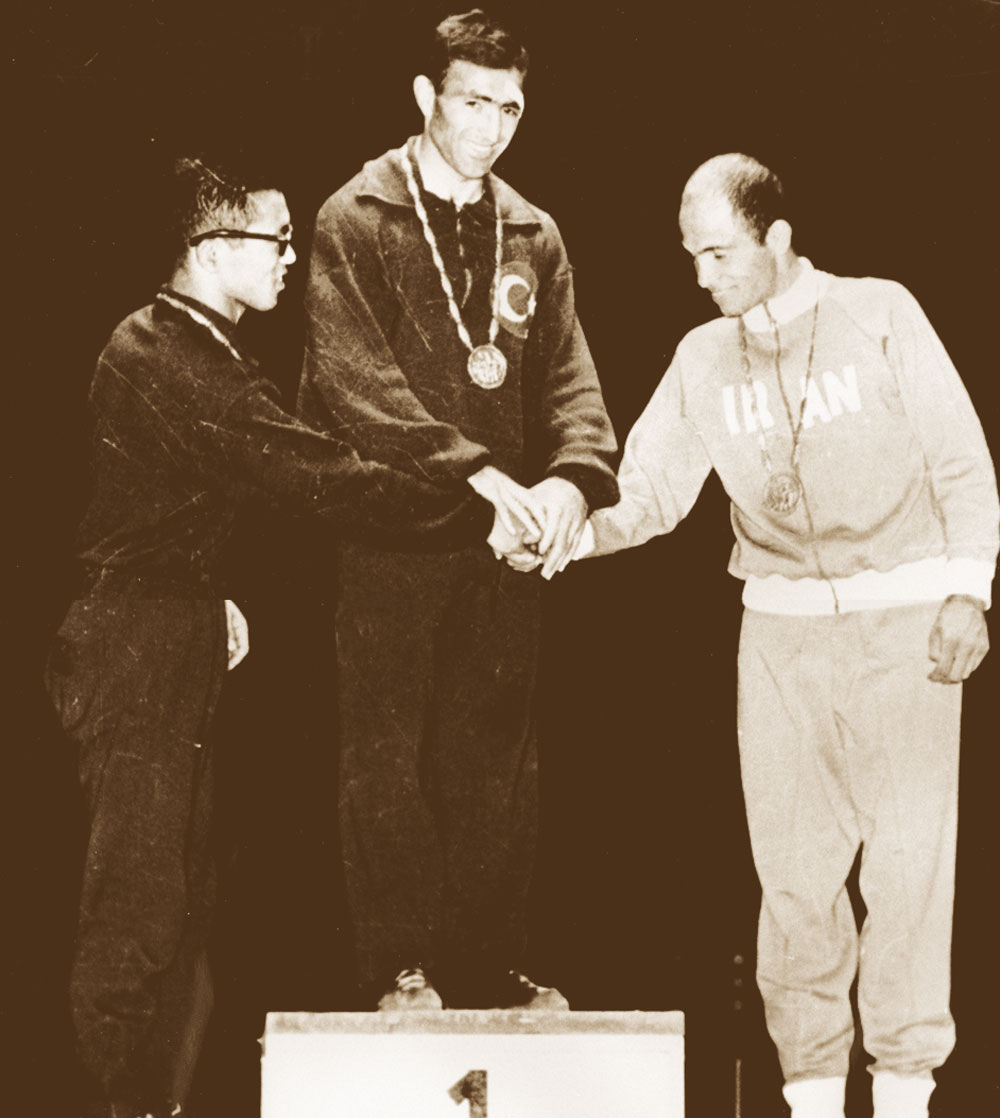
- Medal winners
- Venue: Basilica of Maxentius
- Dates: 1–6 September 1960
- Competitors: 17 from 17 nations

Medalists
1st place, gold medalist(s)		Ahmet Bilek	Turkey
2nd place, silver medalist(s)		Masayuki Matsubara	Japan
3rd place, bronze medalist(s)		Ebrahim Seifpour	Iran

The men's freestyle flyweight competition at the 1960 Summer Olympics in Rome took place from 1 to 6 September at the Basilica of Maxentius. Nations were limited to one competitor. Flyweight was the lightest category, including wrestlers weighing up to 52 kilograms (114.6 lb).

== Competition format ==
This freestyle wrestling competition continued to use the "bad points" elimination system introduced at the 1928 Summer Olympics for Greco-Roman and at the 1932 Summer Olympics for freestyle wrestling, though adjusted the point values slightly. Wins by fall continued to be worth 0 points and wins by decision continued to be worth 1 point. Losses by fall, however, were now worth 4 points (up from 3). Losses by decision were worth 3 points (consistent with most prior years, though in some losses by split decision had been worth only 2 points). Ties were now allowed, worth 2 points for each wrestler. The elimination threshold was also increased from 5 points to 6 points. The medal round concept, used in 1952 and 1956 requiring a round-robin amongst the medalists even if one or more finished a round with enough points for elimination, was used only if exactly three wrestlers remained after a round—if two competitors remained, they faced off head-to-head; if only one, he was the gold medalist.

== Results ==
=== Round 1 ===
Bouts

Winner	Nation	Victory Type	Loser	Nation
Din Nawab	Pakistan	Fall	Seán O'Connor	Ireland
Ahmet Bilek	Turkey	Decision	Masayuki Matsubara	Japan
Gray Simons	United States	Fall	Bengt Frännfors	Sweden
Ali Aliyev	Soviet Union	Fall	Faiz Mohammad Khakshar	Afghanistan
Lesław Kropp	Poland	Fall	Jorge Rosado	Mexico
André Zoete	France	Fall	Väinö Rantala	Finland
Ebrahim Seifpour	Iran	Fall	Dieter Gröning	Australia
Paul Neff	United Team of Germany	Decision	Carlo Vitrano	Italy
Nikola Vasilev Dimitrov	Bulgaria	Bye	N/A	N/A

Points

Rank	Wrestler	Nation	Start	Earned	Total
1	Ali Aliyev	Soviet Union	0	0	0
1	Nikola Vasilev Dimitrov	Bulgaria	0	0	0
1	Lesław Kropp	Poland	0	0	0
1	Din Nawab	Pakistan	0	0	0
1	Ebrahim Seifpour	Iran	0	0	0
1	Gray Simons	United States	0	0	0
1	André Zoete	France	0	0	0
8	Ahmet Bilek	Turkey	0	1	1
8	Paul Neff	United Team of Germany	0	1	1
10	Masayuki Matsubara	Japan	0	3	3
10	Carlo Vitrano	Italy	0	3	3
12	Bengt Frännfors	Sweden	0	4	4
12	Dieter Gröning	Australia	0	4	4
12	Faiz Mohammad Khakshar	Afghanistan	0	4	4
12	Seán O'Connor	Ireland	0	4	4
12	Väinö Rantala	Finland	0	4	4
12	Jorge Rosado	Mexico	0	4	4

=== Round 2 ===
Bouts

Winner	Nation	Victory Type	Loser	Nation
Din Nawab	Pakistan	Decision	Nikola Vasilev Dimitrov	Bulgaria
Masayuki Matsubara	Japan	Fall	Seán O'Connor	Ireland
Ahmet Bilek	Turkey	Fall	Gray Simons	United States
Ali Aliyev	Soviet Union	Fall	Bengt Frännfors	Sweden
Jorge Rosado	Mexico	Fall	Faiz Mohammad Khakshar	Afghanistan
André Zoete	France	Fall	Lesław Kropp	Poland
Ebrahim Seifpour	Iran	Fall	Väinö Rantala	Finland
Paul Neff	United Team of Germany	Fall	Dieter Gröning	Australia
Carlo Vitrano	Italy	Bye	N/A	N/A

Points

Rank	Wrestler	Nation	Start	Earned	Total
1	Ali Aliyev	Soviet Union	0	0	0
1	Ebrahim Seifpour	Iran	0	0	0
1	André Zoete	France	0	0	0
4	Ahmet Bilek	Turkey	1	0	1
4	Din Nawab	Pakistan	0	1	1
4	Paul Neff	United Team of Germany	1	0	1
7	Nikola Vasilev Dimitrov	Bulgaria	0	3	3
7	Masayuki Matsubara	Japan	3	0	3
7	Carlo Vitrano	Italy	3	0	3
10	Lesław Kropp	Poland	0	4	4
10	Jorge Rosado	Mexico	4	0	4
10	Gray Simons	United States	0	4	4
13	Bengt Frännfors	Sweden	4	4	8
13	Dieter Gröning	Australia	4	4	8
13	Faiz Mohammad Khakshar	Afghanistan	4	4	8
13	Seán O'Connor	Ireland	4	4	8
13	Väinö Rantala	Finland	4	4	8

=== Round 3 ===
Kropp's head-to-head victory over Rosado in round 1 was the tie-breaker for 11th place.

Bouts

Winner	Nation	Victory Type	Loser	Nation
Nikola Vasilev Dimitrov	Bulgaria	Fall	Carlo Vitrano	Italy
Masayuki Matsubara	Japan	Fall	Din Nawab	Pakistan
Ali Aliyev	Soviet Union	Decision	Ahmet Bilek	Turkey
Gray Simons	United States	Fall	Jorge Rosado	Mexico
Ebrahim Seifpour	Iran	Fall	Lesław Kropp	Poland
Paul Neff	United Team of Germany	Fall	André Zoete	France

Points

Rank	Wrestler	Nation	Start	Earned	Total
1	Ebrahim Seifpour	Iran	0	0	0
2	Ali Aliyev	Soviet Union	0	1	1
2	Paul Neff	United Team of Germany	1	0	1
4	Nikola Vasilev Dimitrov	Bulgaria	3	0	3
4	Masayuki Matsubara	Japan	3	0	3
6	Ahmet Bilek	Turkey	1	3	4
6	Gray Simons	United States	4	0	4
6	André Zoete	France	0	4	4
9	Din Nawab	Pakistan	1	4	5
10	Carlo Vitrano	Italy	3	4	7
11	Lesław Kropp	Poland	4	4	8
12	Jorge Rosado	Mexico	4	4	8

=== Round 4 ===
Bouts

Winner	Nation	Victory Type	Loser	Nation
Masayuki Matsubara	Japan	Fall	Nikola Vasilev Dimitrov	Bulgaria
Ahmet Bilek	Turkey	Fall	Din Nawab	Pakistan
Gray Simons	United States	Decision	Ali Aliyev	Soviet Union
Ebrahim Seifpour	Iran	Fall	André Zoete	France
Paul Neff	United Team of Germany	Bye	N/A	N/A

Points

Rank	Wrestler	Nation	Start	Earned	Total
1	Ebrahim Seifpour	Iran	0	0	0
2	Paul Neff	United Team of Germany	1	0	1
3	Masayuki Matsubara	Japan	3	0	3
4	Ali Aliyev	Soviet Union	1	3	4
4	Ahmet Bilek	Turkey	4	0	4
6	Gray Simons	United States	4	1	5
7	Nikola Vasilev Dimitrov	Bulgaria	3	4	7
8	André Zoete	France	4	4	8
9	Din Nawab	Pakistan	5	4	9

=== Round 5 ===
Simons's victory over Aliyev in round 4 was the tie-breaker for 5th place.

Bouts

Winner	Nation	Victory Type	Loser	Nation
Ahmet Bilek	Turkey	Fall	Paul Neff	United Team of Germany
Masayuki Matsubara	Japan	Decision	Gray Simons	United States
Ebrahim Seifpour	Iran	Fall	Ali Aliyev	Soviet Union

Points

Rank	Wrestler	Nation	Start	Earned	Total
1	Ebrahim Seifpour	Iran	0	0	0
2	Ahmet Bilek	Turkey	4	0	4
2	Masayuki Matsubara	Japan	3	1	4
4	Paul Neff	United Team of Germany	1	4	5
5	Gray Simons	United States	5	3	8
6	Ali Aliyev	Soviet Union	4	4	8

=== Round 6 ===
Bouts

Winner	Nation	Victory Type	Loser	Nation
Masayuki Matsubara	Japan	Fall	Paul Neff	United Team of Germany
Ahmet Bilek	Turkey	Decision	Ebrahim Seifpour	Iran

Points

Rank	Wrestler	Nation	Start	Earned	Total
1	Ebrahim Seifpour	Iran	0	3	3
2	Masayuki Matsubara	Japan	4	0	4
3	Ahmet Bilek	Turkey	4	1	5
4	Paul Neff	United Team of Germany	5	4	9

=== Round 7 ===
Seifpour was eliminated at 6 points, earning bronze. Bilek and Matsubara were the only remaining wrestlers, each at 5 points; they had wrestled in the first round, with Bilek winning, so Bilek took gold on the head-to-head tie-breaker.

Bouts

Winner	Nation	Victory Type	Loser	Nation
Masayuki Matsubara	Japan	Decision	Ebrahim Seifpour	Iran

Points

Rank	Wrestler	Nation	Start	Earned	Total
1st place, gold medalist(s)	Ahmet Bilek	Turkey	4	1	5
2nd place, silver medalist(s)	Masayuki Matsubara	Japan	4	1	5
3rd place, bronze medalist(s)	Ebrahim Seifpour	Iran	3	3	6
