= Wrestling at the 1960 Summer Olympics – Men's freestyle welterweight =

Wrestling at the Olympics

Men's freestyle welterweight at the Games of the XVII Olympiad
- Venue: Basilica of Maxentius
- Dates: 1–6 September 1960
- Competitors: 23 from 23 nations

Medalists
1st place, gold medalist(s)		Doug Blubaugh	United States
2nd place, silver medalist(s)		İsmail Ogan	Turkey
3rd place, bronze medalist(s)		Muhammad Bashir	Pakistan

The men's freestyle welterweight competition at the 1960 Summer Olympics in Rome took place from 1 to 6 September at the Basilica of Maxentius. Each nation was limited to one competitor. The Welterweight was the fourth-heaviest category, including wrestlers weighing 67 to 73 kilograms (147.7 to 160.9 lb).

== Competition format ==
This freestyle wrestling competition continued to use the "bad points" elimination system introduced at the 1928 Summer Olympics for Greco-Roman and at the 1932 Summer Olympics for freestyle wrestling, though adjusted the point values slightly. Wins by fall continued to be worth 0 points and wins by decision continued to be worth 1 point. Losses by fall, however, were now worth 4 points (up from 3). Losses by decision were worth 3 points (consistent with most prior years, though in some losses by split decision had been worth only 2 points). Ties were now allowed, worth 2 points for each wrestler. The elimination threshold was also increased from 5 points to 6 points. The medal round concept, used in 1952 and 1956 requiring a round-robin amongst the medalists even if one or more finished a round with enough points for elimination, was used only if exactly three wrestlers remained after a round—if two competitors remained, they faced off head-to-head; if only one, he was the gold medalist.

== Results ==
=== Round 1 ===
Rantanen withdrew after his bout.

Bouts

Winner	Nation	Victory Type	Loser	Nation
İsmail Ogan	Turkey	Decision	Vakhtang Balavadze	Soviet Union
Udey Chand	India	Decision	Joe Feeney	Ireland
Yutaka Kaneko	Japan	Fall	Musa Kazanov	Bulgaria
Coenraad de Villiers	South Africa	Decision	Franz Berger	Austria
Gaetano De Vescovi	Italy	Decision	Juan Flores	Mexico
Emam Ali Habibi	Iran	Fall	Choi Myeong-jong	South Korea
Åke Carlsson	Sweden	Decision	Veikko Rantanen	Finland
Muhammad Bashir	Pakistan	Fall	Peter Amey	Great Britain
Juan Rolón	Argentina	Decision	Sultan Mohammad Dost	Afghanistan
Doug Blubaugh	United States	Fall	Kurt Boese	Canada
Karl Bruggmann	Switzerland	Fall	Robert Clark	Australia
Martin Heinze	United Team of Germany	Bye	N/A	N/A

Points

Rank	Wrestler	Nation	Start	Earned	Total
1	Muhammad Bashir	Pakistan	0	0	0
1	Doug Blubaugh	United States	0	0	0
1	Karl Bruggmann	Switzerland	0	0	0
1	Emam Ali Habibi	Iran	0	0	0
1	Martin Heinze	United Team of Germany	0	0	0
1	Yutaka Kaneko	Japan	0	0	0
7	Åke Carlsson	Sweden	0	1	1
7	Udey Chand	India	0	1	1
7	Gaetano De Vescovi	Italy	0	1	1
7	Coenraad de Villiers	South Africa	0	1	1
7	İsmail Ogan	Turkey	0	1	1
7	Juan Rolón	Argentina	0	1	1
13	Vakhtang Balavadze	Soviet Union	0	3	3
13	Joe Feeney	Ireland	0	3	3
13	Franz Berger	Austria	0	3	3
13	Juan Flores	Mexico	0	3	3
13	Sultan Mohammad Dost	Afghanistan	0	3	3
18	Peter Amey	Great Britain	0	4	4
18	Kurt Boese	Canada	0	4	4
18	Choi Myeong-jong	South Korea	0	4	4
18	Robert Clark	Australia	0	4	4
18	Musa Kazanov	Bulgaria	0	4	4
23	Veikko Rantanen	Finland	0	3	3*

=== Round 2 ===
Bouts

Winner	Nation	Victory Type	Loser	Nation
İsmail Ogan	Turkey	Decision	Martin Heinze	United Team of Germany
Vakhtang Balavadze	Soviet Union	Decision	Udey Chand	India
Musa Kazanov	Bulgaria	Decision	Joe Feeney	Ireland
Yutaka Kaneko	Japan	Fall	Franz Berger	Austria
Coenraad de Villiers	South Africa	Fall	Juan Flores	Mexico
Emam Ali Habibi	Iran	Decision	Åke Carlsson	Sweden
Gaetano De Vescovi	Italy	Fall	Choi Myeong-jong	South Korea
Muhammad Bashir	Pakistan	Decision	Juan Rolón	Argentina
Peter Amey	Great Britain	Decision	Sultan Mohammad Dost	Afghanistan
Doug Blubaugh	United States	Fall	Karl Bruggmann	Switzerland
Kurt Boese	Canada	Fall	Robert Clark	Australia

Points

Rank	Wrestler	Nation	Start	Earned	Total
1	Doug Blubaugh	United States	0	0	0
1	Yutaka Kaneko	Japan	0	0	0
3	Muhammad Bashir	Pakistan	0	1	1
3	Gaetano De Vescovi	Italy	1	0	1
3	Coenraad de Villiers	South Africa	1	0	1
3	Emam Ali Habibi	Iran	0	1	1
7	İsmail Ogan	Turkey	1	1	2
8	Martin Heinze	United Team of Germany	0	3	3
9	Vakhtang Balavadze	Soviet Union	3	1	4
9	Kurt Boese	Canada	4	0	4
9	Karl Bruggmann	Switzerland	0	4	4
9	Åke Carlsson	Sweden	1	3	4
9	Udey Chand	India	1	3	4
9	Juan Rolón	Argentina	1	3	4
15	Peter Amey	Great Britain	4	1	5
15	Musa Kazanov	Bulgaria	4	1	5
17	Sultan Mohammad Dost	Afghanistan	3	3	6
17	Joe Feeney	Ireland	3	3	6
19	Franz Berger	Austria	3	4	7
19	Juan Flores	Mexico	3	4	7
21	Choi Myeong-jong	South Korea	4	4	8
21	Robert Clark	Australia	4	4	8

=== Round 3 ===
Bouts

Winner	Nation	Victory Type	Loser	Nation
Martin Heinze	United Team of Germany	Tie	Vakhtang Balavadze	Soviet Union
İsmail Ogan	Turkey	Fall	Udey Chand	India
Musa Kazanov	Bulgaria	Decision	Coenraad de Villiers	South Africa
Gaetano De Vescovi	Italy	Fall	Yutaka Kaneko	Japan
Emam Ali Habibi	Iran	Decision	Muhammad Bashir	Pakistan
Åke Carlsson	Sweden	Fall	Peter Amey	Great Britain
Doug Blubaugh	United States	Walkover	Juan Rolón	Argentina
Karl Bruggmann	Switzerland	Decision	Kurt Boese	Canada

Points

Rank	Wrestler	Nation	Start	Earned	Total
1	Doug Blubaugh	United States	0	0	0
2	Gaetano De Vescovi	Italy	1	0	1
3	Emam Ali Habibi	Iran	1	1	2
3	İsmail Ogan	Turkey	2	0	2
5	Muhammad Bashir	Pakistan	1	3	4
5	Åke Carlsson	Sweden	4	0	4
5	Coenraad de Villiers	South Africa	1	3	4
5	Yutaka Kaneko	Japan	0	4	4
9	Karl Bruggmann	Switzerland	4	1	5
9	Martin Heinze	United Team of Germany	3	2	5
11	Vakhtang Balavadze	Soviet Union	4	2	6
11	Musa Kazanov	Bulgaria	5	1	6
13	Kurt Boese	Canada	4	3	7
14	Udey Chand	India	4	4	8
14	Juan Rolón	Argentina	4	4	8
16	Peter Amey	Great Britain	5	4	9

=== Round 4 ===
Bouts

Winner	Nation	Victory Type	Loser	Nation
Yutaka Kaneko	Japan	Fall	Martin Heinze	United Team of Germany
İsmail Ogan	Turkey	Decision	Coenraad de Villiers	South Africa
Emam Ali Habibi	Iran	Decision	Gaetano De Vescovi	Italy
Doug Blubaugh	United States	Fall	Åke Carlsson	Sweden
Muhammad Bashir	Pakistan	Fall	Karl Bruggmann	Switzerland

Points

Rank	Wrestler	Nation	Start	Earned	Total
1	Doug Blubaugh	United States	0	0	0
2	Emam Ali Habibi	Iran	2	1	3
2	İsmail Ogan	Turkey	2	1	3
4	Muhammad Bashir	Pakistan	4	0	4
4	Gaetano De Vescovi	Italy	1	3	4
4	Yutaka Kaneko	Japan	4	0	4
7	Coenraad de Villiers	South Africa	4	3	7
8	Åke Carlsson	Sweden	4	4	8
9	Karl Bruggmann	Switzerland	5	4	9
9	Martin Heinze	United Team of Germany	5	4	9

=== Round 5 ===
Bouts

Winner	Nation	Victory Type	Loser	Nation
İsmail Ogan	Turkey	Decision	Yutaka Kaneko	Japan
Muhammad Bashir	Pakistan	Decision	Gaetano De Vescovi	Italy
Doug Blubaugh	United States	Fall	Emam Ali Habibi	Iran

Points

Rank	Wrestler	Nation	Start	Earned	Total
1	Doug Blubaugh	United States	0	0	0
2	İsmail Ogan	Turkey	3	1	4
3	Muhammad Bashir	Pakistan	4	1	5
4	Emam Ali Habibi	Iran	3	4	7
4	Gaetano De Vescovi	Italy	4	3	7
4	Yutaka Kaneko	Japan	4	3	7

=== Round 6 ===
With three remaining wrestlers, the competition used a round-robin to determine the medalists rather than giving one wrestler a bye in round 6. Ogan defeated Bashir, but Blubaugh defeated both of them to take the gold medal.

Bouts

Winner	Nation	Victory Type	Loser	Nation
İsmail Ogan	Turkey	Decision	Muhammad Bashir	Pakistan
Doug Blubaugh	United States	Decision	İsmail Ogan	Turkey
Doug Blubaugh	United States	Fall	Muhammad Bashir	Pakistan

Points

Rank	Wrestler	Nation	Start	Earned	Total
1st place, gold medalist(s)	Doug Blubaugh	United States	0	1	1
2nd place, silver medalist(s)	İsmail Ogan	Turkey	4	4	8
3rd place, bronze medalist(s)	Muhammad Bashir	Pakistan	5	7	12
