= Ireland at the 1960 Summer Olympics =

- IOC code: IRL
- NOC: Olympic Federation of Ireland
- Website: olympics.ie

in Rome
- Competitors: 49 in 8 sports
- Flag bearer: Ron Delany
- Medals: Gold 0 Silver 0 Bronze 0 Total 0

Summer Olympics appearances (overview)
- 1924; 1928; 1932; 1936; 1948; 1952; 1956; 1960; 1964; 1968; 1972; 1976; 1980; 1984; 1988; 1992; 1996; 2000; 2004; 2008; 2012; 2016; 2020; 2024

Other related appearances
- Great Britain (1896–1920)

Ireland competed at the 1960 Summer Olympics in Rome, Italy. 49 competitors, 47 men and 2 women, took part in 39 events in 8 sports.

== Athletics ==
Athlete	Event	Heat		Quarterfinals		Semifinal		Final	
Athlete	Event	Time	Rank	Time	Rank	Time	Rank	Time	Rank
Patrick Lowry	Men's 100m	10.9	6	Did Not Advance					
Patrick Lowry	Men's 200m	22.1	5	Did Not Advance					
Ron Delaney	Men's 800m	1:51.19	3	1:51.42	6	Did Not Advance			
Michael Hoey	Men's 5000m	15:00.52	10	–				Did Not Advance	
Gerry McIntyre	Marathon	–						2:26:03.0	22
Willie Dunne	Marathon	–						2:33:08.0	42
Bertie Messitt	Marathon	–						DNF	
Frank O'Reilly	Men's 50 km Walk	–						4:54:40.0	20
Maeve Kyle	Women's 100m	12.59	5	Did Not Advance					
Maeve Kyle	Women's 200m	25.06	5	Did Not Advance					

=== Field ===
Athlete	Event	Qualification		Final	
Athlete	Event	Mark	Rank	Mark	Rank
John Lawlor	Men's Hammer Throw	62.10	7	65.95	4

== Boxing ==
Athlete	Event	Round of 32	Round of 16	Quarterfinals	Semifinals	Final
Athlete	Event	Opposition Result	Opposition Result	Opposition Result	Opposition Result	Opposition Result
Adam McLean	Flyweight	Young (NGR) L 3–1	Did Not Advance			
Patrick Kenny	Bantamweight	Anner (SUI) W 5–0	Armstrong (USA) L 3–2	Did Not Advance		
Ando Reddy	Featherweight	Iuncker (FRA) W 3–2	Bekker (RHO) L 3–2	Did Not Advance		
Danny O'Brien	Lightweight	Aguilera (CUB) W 5–0	Lopopolo (ITA) L 5–0	Did Not Advance		
Bernie Meli	Light Welterweight	Mikhail (GRE) W 5–0	Němeček (TCH) L 5–0	Did Not Advance		
Harry Perry	Welterweight	Gi-su (KOR) W 5–0	Did Not Advance			
Michael Reid	Light Middleweight	Crescêncio (BRA) W 4–1	Dampc (POL) L 5–0	Did Not Advance		
Eamonn McKeon	Middleweight	Ben Gandoubi (TUN) W 5–0	van Rooyen (RSA) L 5–0	Did Not Advance		
Colm McCoy	Light Heavyweight	Aho (FIN) L 4–1	Did Not Advance			
Joe Casey	Heavyweight	Sretenović (YUG) L 4–1	Did Not Advance			

== Cycling ==
Five male cyclists represented Ireland in 1960.

Individual road race

- Peter Crinnion — DNF
- Sonny Cullen — DNF
- Séamus Herron — DNF

Sprint

- Martin McKay =22
- Michael Horgan =22

1000m time trial

- Michael Horgan — 24th 1:17.18

== Fencing ==
Six fencers, five men and one woman, represented Ireland in 1960.

Men's foil

- Brian Hamilton – Round 1 Pool L, 5th (1 Win, 3 Losses)
- Harry Thuillier – Round 1 Pool E, 6th (1 Win, 5 Losses)

Men's épée

- George Carpenter – Round 1 Pool C, 5th (3 Wins, 3 Losses)
- Christopher Bland – Round 1 Pool F, 6th (1 Win, 4 Losses)
- Tom Kearney – Round 1 Pool L, 7th (1 Win, 5 Losses)

Men's team épée

- George Carpenter, Christopher Bland, Brian Hamilton, Tom Kearney – Round 1 Pool C 3rd (0 Wins, 2 Losses) =15th

Women's foil

- Shirley Armstrong – Round 1 Pool E 5th (1 Win, 4 Losses)

== Sailing ==
- John Somers Payne – Finn 18th
- Johnny Hooper & Peter Gray – Flying Dutchman 10th
- Jimmy Mooney, Robin Benson & David Ryder – Dragon 12th

== Weightlifting ==
Name	Weight Class	Lifted	Rank
Sammy Dalzell	Men's 60 kg	270.0 kg	22nd
Tommy Hayden	Men's 67.5 kg	307.5 kg	22nd

== Wrestling ==
Name	Event	Round 1	Round 2	Round 3	Round 4	Round 5	Round 6	Rank
Gerry Martina	Men's Freestyle Light Heavyweight	van Zyl (RSA) L Fall	Did Not Advance					19
Sean O'Connor	Men's freestyle flyweight	Nawab (PAK) L Fall	Matsubara (JPN) L Fall	Did Not Advance				=13
Dermot Dunne	Men's freestyle bantamweight	Mancini (SMR) W Decision	Asai (JPN) L Fall	Chinazzo (ITA) L Fall	Did Not Advance			13
Joe Feeney	Men's freestyle welterweight	Chand (IND) L Decision	Kazanov (BUL) L Decision	Did Not Advance				17
