= Weightlifting at the 1960 Summer Olympics =

Weightlifting at the Games of the XVII Olympiad
- Venue: Palazzetto dello Sport
- Dates: 7–10 September 1960
- Competitors: 172 from 53 nations

The weightlifting competition at the 1960 Summer Olympics in Rome consisted of seven weight classes, all for men only.

== Medal summary ==
Games	Gold	Silver	Bronze
56 kg	Charles Vinci; United States	Yoshinobu Miyake; Japan	Esmaeil Elmkhah; Iran
60 kg	Yevgeny Minayev; Soviet Union	Isaac Berger; United States	Sebastiano Mannironi; Italy
67.5 kg	Viktor Bushuev; Soviet Union	Tan Howe Liang; Singapore	Abdul-Wahid Aziz; Iraq
75 kg	Aleksandr Kurynov; Soviet Union	Tommy Kono; United States	Győző Veres; Hungary
82.5 kg	Ireneusz Paliński; Poland	Jim George; United States	Jan Bochenek; Poland
90 kg	Arkadi Vorobyev; Soviet Union	Trofim Lomakin; Soviet Union	Louis Martin; Great Britain
+90 kg	Yury Vlasov; Soviet Union	James Bradford; United States	Norbert Schemansky; United States

== Medal table ==
Rank	Nation	Gold	Silver	Bronze	Total
1	Soviet Union	5	1	0	6
2	United States	1	4	1	6
3	Poland	1	0	1	2
4	Japan	0	1	0	1
4	Singapore	0	1	0	1
6	Great Britain	0	0	1	1
6	Hungary	0	0	1	1
6	Iran	0	0	1	1
6	Iraq	0	0	1	1
6	Italy	0	0	1	1
Totals (10 entries)		7	7	7	21

== Participating nations ==
- Australia (7)
- Austria (4)
- Belgium (2)
- Brazil (1)
- British West Indies (1)
- Bulgaria (7)
- Burma (2)
- Canada (3)
- Formosa (2)
- Colombia (3)
- Cuba (1)
- Czechoslovakia (3)
- Finland (2)
- France (6)
- United Team of Germany (7)
- Great Britain (7)
- Greece (1)
- Haiti (1)
- Hungary (5)
- India (1)
- Indonesia (2)
- Iran (5)
- Iraq (5)
- Ireland (2)
- Israel (2)
- Italy (7)
- Japan (7)
- South Korea (7)
- Lebanon (2)
- Luxembourg (2)
- Malaya (2)
- Mexico (1)
- Morocco (4)
- Netherlands Antilles (5)
- New Zealand (1)
- Norway (1)
- Pakistan (2)
- Panama (1)
- Philippines (2)
- Poland (7)
- Portugal (1)
- Puerto Rico (2)
- Romania (2)
- Singapore (1)
- South Africa (3)
- Soviet Union (6)
- Spain (2)
- Sudan (2)
- Sweden (1)
- Switzerland (3)
- United Arab Republic (7)
- United States (7)
- Venezuela (2)

== Sources ==
- "Olympic Medal Winners". International Olympic Committee.
