= Weightlifting at the 1960 Summer Olympics – Men's 56 kg =

Weightlifting at the Olympics

Men's 56 kg at the Games of the XVII Olympiad
- Venue: Palazzetto dello Sport
- Date: 7 September 1960
- Competitors: 22 from 18 nations
- Winning total: 345.0 kg WR

Medalists
1st place, gold medalist(s)		Charles Vinci	United States
2nd place, silver medalist(s)		Yoshinobu Miyake	Japan
3rd place, bronze medalist(s)		Esmaeil Elmkhah	Iran

The men's 56 kg weightlifting competitions at the 1960 Summer Olympics in Rome took place on 7 September at the Palazzetto dello Sport. It was the fourth appearance of the bantamweight class.

== Results ==
Rank	Name	Country	kg
1	Charles Vinci	United States	345.0
2	Yoshinobu Miyake	Japan	337.5
3	Esmaeil Elmkhah	Iran	330.0
4	Shigeo Kogure	Japan	322.5
5	Marian Jankowski	Poland	322.5
6	Imre Földi	Hungary	320.0
7	Yu In-ho	South Korea	315.0
8	Ali Hassain Hussain	Iraq	312.5
9	Renzo Grandi	Italy	307.5
10	Grantley Sobers	British West Indies	307.5
11	Hector Curiel	Netherlands Antilles	305.0
12	Balaș Fitzi	Romania	300.0
13	Rocco Spinola	Italy	300.0
14	Árpád Borsányi	Hungary	295.0
15	Fernando Báez	Puerto Rico	290.0
16	Zuhair Elia Mansour	Iraq	290.0
17	Tan Tjoe Gwat	Indonesia	285.0
18	Eduard Meron	Israel	270.0
19	Luís Paquete	Portugal	245.0
AC	Alberto Canlas	Philippines	167.5
AC	Hans Reck	United Team of Germany	170.0
AC	Muhammad Azam	Pakistan	182.5
