= Carlo Vitrano =

Italian wrestler (1938–2020)

Personal information
- Nationality: Italian
- Born: 10 January 1938 Palermo, Italy
- Died: 10 November 2020 (aged 82) Palermo, Italy

Sport
- Sport: Wrestling

Carlo Vitrano (10 January 1938 – 10 November 2020) was an Italian wrestler. He competed in the men's freestyle flyweight at the 1960 Summer Olympics.

Vitrano died on 10 November 2020, at the age of 82.
