= Árpád Borsányi =

Hungarian weightlifter (1932–1980)

Personal information
- Nationality: Hungarian
- Born: 12 May 1932; Pesterzsébet, Hungary
- Died: 31 December 1980 (aged 48); Budapest, Hungary

Sport
- Sport: Weightlifting

Árpád Borsányi (12 May 1932 – 31 December 1980) was a Hungarian weightlifter. He competed in the men's bantamweight event at the 1960 Summer Olympics.
