= Juan Flores (wrestler) =

Mexican wrestler (born 1940)

Personal information
- Born: 26 November 1940 (age 85) Mexico City, Mexico

Sport
- Sport: Wrestling

Juan Flores (born 26 November 1940) is a Mexican wrestler. He competed in the men's freestyle welterweight at the 1960 Summer Olympics.
