= Hans Reck (weightlifter) =

German weightlifter (born 1934)

Personal information
- Nationality: German
- Born: 31 March 1934 (age 91) Cunewalde, Germany

Sport
- Sport: Weightlifting

Hans Reck (born 31 March 1934) is a German weightlifter. He competed in the men's bantamweight event at the 1960 Summer Olympics.
