= Tan Tjoe Gwat =

Indonesian weightlifter

Personal information
- Nationality: Indonesian
- Born: 22 July 1938 (age 88) Wonogiri, Indonesia

Sport
- Sport: Weightlifting

Daniel Tanto Gardjito (born Tan Tjoe Gwat, 22 July 1938) is an Indonesian weightlifter. Upon placing within the top five of his category at the 1959 World Weightlifting Championships, he was selected to compete for Indonesia at the 1960 Summer Olympics. There, he placed 17th in the men's bantamweight event. He remained active in masters weightlifting in the 2000s, winning a silver medal at the 2002 World Masters Games.

== Biography ==
Tan Tjoe Gwat was born on 22 July 1938 in Wonogiri Regency, Central Java, Indonesia. Growing up in Wonogiri, Tan was often sick though eventually trained in weightlifting alongside his brother, growing up much healthier. As a weightlifter, Tan competed at the 1959 World Weightlifting Championships held in Warsaw, Poland for Indonesia. In order to be selected for the 1960 Summer Olympics held in Rome, Italy, he had to place within the top five of his category. There, he beat seven other competitors and placed within the top five and was selected alongside Asber Nasution to represent Indonesia.

At the 1960 Summer Games, Tan competed in the men's bantamweight event for weightlifters that weighed 56 kilograms (123 lb) or less. He pressed 85 kilograms, snatched 90 kilograms, and clean and jerked 110 kilograms for a total of 285 kilograms. Overall, he placed 17th out of the 22 athletes that competed. After the competition, he bought a camera and tried to document weightlifters competing in other categories but was unsuccessful in doing so.

After his professional sporting career, he adopted the name Daniel Tanto Gardjito, resided in Surakarta with his wife, and worked as a mechanic. He was also an active masters weightlifter, competing at the 2002 World Masters Games, earning a silver medal, and the 2009 World Masters Weightlifting Championships.
