= Rocco Spinola =

Italian weightlifter 1930–1998

Rocco Arturo Spinola
Personal information
- Nationality: Italian
- Born: 27 October 1930; Supersano, Kingdom of Italy
- Died: 10 October 1998 (aged 67); Milan, Italy

Sport
- Sport: Weightlifting

Rocco Arturo Spinola (27 October 1930 – 10 October 1998) was an Italian weightlifter. He competed in the men's bantamweight event at the 1960 Summer Olympics.
