= Lesław Kropp =

Polish wrestler

Personal information
- Nationality: Polish
- Born: 22 November 1936 Bronów, Poland
- Died: 12 October 2013 (aged 76) Zgierz, Poland

Sport
- Sport: Wrestling

Lesław Kropp (22 November 1936 – 12 October 2013) was a Polish wrestler. He competed in the men's freestyle flyweight at the 1960 Summer Olympics.
