= Jorge Rosado =

Mexican wrestler (1939–2009)

Personal information
- Born: 12 January 1939 Mexico City, Mexico
- Died: 9 June 2009 (aged 70)

Sport
- Sport: Wrestling

Jorge Rosado (12 January 1939 – 9 June 2009) was a Mexican wrestler. He competed in the men's freestyle flyweight at the 1960 Summer Olympics.
