= Dieter Gröning =

Australian wrestler

Personal information
- Nationality: Australian
- Born: 26 July 1932 Gdańsk, Poland
- Died: 15 June 1996 (aged 63)

Sport
- Sport: Wrestling

Dieter Gröning (26 July 1932 – 15 June 1996) was an Australian wrestler. He competed in the men's freestyle flyweight at the 1960 Summer Olympics.
