= Musa Kazanov =

Bulgarian wrestler

Personal information
- Nationality: Bulgarian
- Born: 27 November 1936 (age 89) Razgrad, Bulgaria

Sport
- Sport: Wrestling

Musa Kazanov (born 27 November 1936) is a Bulgarian wrestler. He competed in the men's freestyle welterweight at the 1960 Summer Olympics.
