= Bashir Ahmed (field hockey, born 1934) =

Pakistani field hockey player (born 1934)

Personal information
- Born: 23 December 1934 (age 91) Karachi, Sind, British India
Medal record
Men's field hockey
Representing Pakistan
Olympic Games
Gold medal – first place	1960 Rome	Team competition
Asian Games
Gold medal – first place	1962 Jakarta	Team competition

Bashir Ahmed (born 23 December 1934) is a Pakistani former field hockey player. He was part of the gold-winning Pakistani national team at the 1960 Summer Olympics where Pakistan defeated India in the final of the hockey tournament to win the nation's first Olympic gold.
