= Ali Hassain Hussain =

Iraqi weightlifter

Personal information
- Nationality: Iraqi
- Born: 1934 or 1935 (age 90); Baghdad, Iraq

Sport
- Sport: Weightlifting

Ali Hassain Hussain (born 1934/1935) is an Iraqi weightlifter. He competed in the men's bantamweight event at the 1960 Summer Olympics.
