= Haider Khan (athlete) =

Pakistani athlete (born 1932)

Personal information
- Nationality: Pakistani
- Born: 30 November 1932 (age 93)

Sport
- Sport: Athletics
- Events: Shot put Discus

Haider Khan (born 30 November 1932) is a Pakistani athlete. He competed in the men's shot put and the men's discus throw at the 1960 Summer Olympics.
