= İsmet Atlı =

Turkish Olympic medalist sports wrestler (1931–2014)

Medal record

Men's Freestyle Wrestling

Representing Turkey

Olympic Games
Gold medal – first place	1960 Rome	87 kg

World Championships
Silver medal – second place	1954 Tokyo	79 kg
Bronze medal – third place	1957 Istanbul	87 kg

World Cup
Gold medal – first place	1956 Istanbul	79 kg

Mediterranean Games
Gold medal – first place	1951 Alexandria	87 kg

Men's Greco-Roman Wrestling

Representing Turkey

World Championships
Bronze medal – third place	1962 Toledo	97 kg

İsmet Atlı (1931, Çukurören, Adana – 4 April 2014, Adana) was a Turkish Olympic medalist sports wrestler in the Light heavyweight class and a trainer. He won the gold medal in Men's Freestyle wrestling at the 1960 Olympics.

He was born 1931 in Çukurören village of Kozan district in Adana Province of southern Turkey. He began wrestling in 1950 and was trained by the renowned wrestlers Celal Atik and Yaşar Doğu. He performed at the national level 62 times in his wrestling career, which lasted until 1964.

İsmet Atlı competed at several international wrestling events successfully in both wrestling styles and participated at three consecutive Olympic Games in 1952, 1956 and 1960.

After his retirement from the active sports in 1962, İsmet Atlı acted as a trainer. He also worked as a sports journalist.

== Achievements ==
- 1951 Mediterranean Games in Alexandria, Egypt – gold (Freestyle Middleweight)
- 1952 Summer Olympics in Helsinki, Finland – 5th (Greco-Roman Light heavyweight)
- 1953 World Wrestling Championships in Naples, Italy – 4th (Greco-Roman Middleweight)
- 1954 World Wrestling Championships in Tokyo, Japan – silver (Greco-Roman Middleweight)
- 1955 World Wrestling Championships in Karlsruhe, Germany – 5th (Greco-Roman Middleweight)
- 1956 World Wrestling Cup in Istanbul, Turkey – gold (Freestyle Middleweight)
- 1956 Summer Olympics in Melbourne, Australia – 4th (Freestyle Middleweight)
- 1957 World Wrestling Championships in Istanbul, Turkey – bronze (Freestyle Light heavyweight)
- 1960 Summer Olympics in Rome, Italy – gold (Freestyle Light heavyweight)
- 1962 World Wrestling Championships in Toledo, Ohio, U.S. – bronze (Greco-Roman Light heavyweight), 4th (Freestyle Light heavyweight)
