= Balaș Fitzi =

Romanian weightlifter

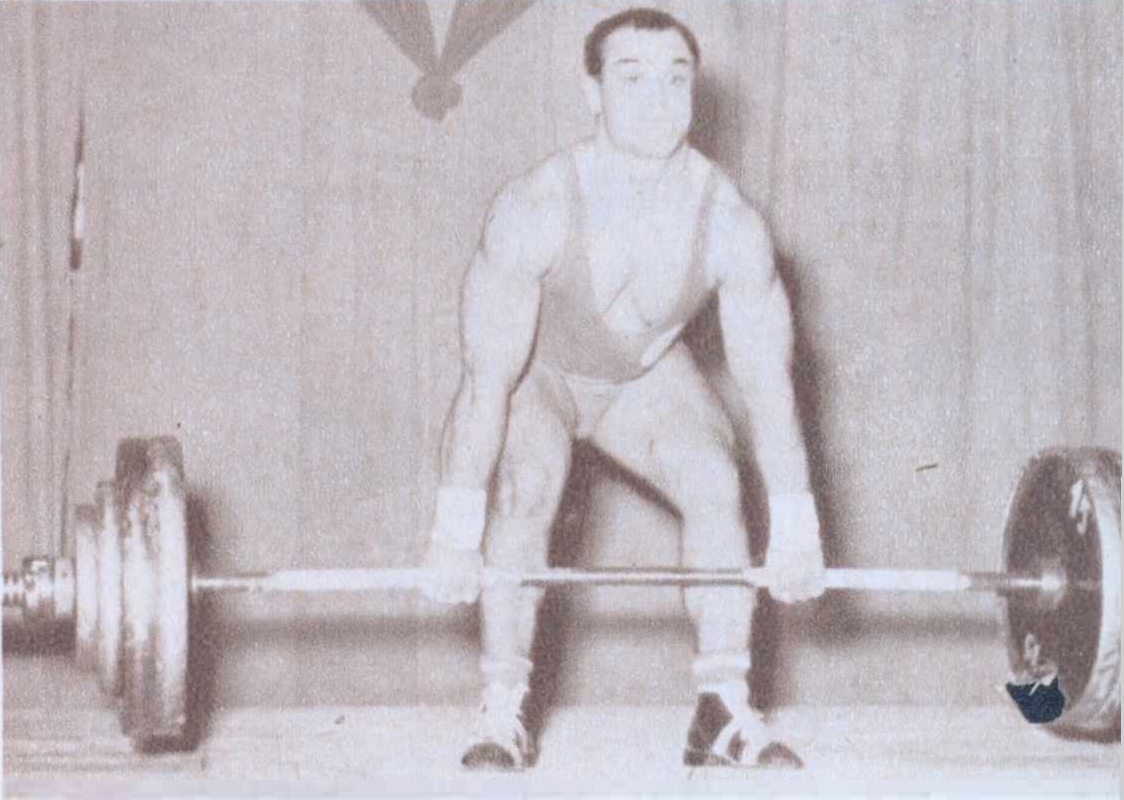
- Fiți Balaș 1965.

Personal information
- Other names: Fiți Balaș
- Nationality: Romanian
- Born: 2 January 1941 Cluj-Napoca, Romania
- Died: 2001 (aged 59–60)

Sport
- Sport: Weightlifting

Balaș Fitzi (2 January 1941 – 2001) or Fiți Balaș was a Romanian weightlifter. He competed at the 1960 Summer Olympics and the 1964 Summer Olympics.
