= Väinö Rantala =

Finnish wrestler

Personal information
- Nationality: Finnish
- Born: 28 August 1941 (age 84) Ylivieska, Finland

Sport
- Sport: Wrestling

Väinö Rantala (born 28 August 1941) is a Finnish wrestler. He competed in the men's freestyle flyweight at the 1960 Summer Olympics.
