= Saifi Chaudhry =

Pakistani sports shooter (1929–2018)

Personal information
- Born: 15 November 1929 Sialkot, Pakistan
- Died: 9 September 2018 (aged 88) California, U.S.

Sport
- Sport: Sports shooting

Saifi Chaudhry (15 November 1929 – 9 September 2018) was a Pakistani sports shooter. He competed in the 300 m rifle, three positions event at the 1956 Summer Olympics and 50 m rifle three positions and 50 m rifle prone events at the 1960 Summer Olympics. Chaudhry died in California on 9 September 2018, at the age of 88.
