= Peter Amey =

British wrestler (born 1935)

Personal information
- Nationality: British (English)
- Born: 3 August 1935 (age 90) Plymouth, England
- Height: 180 cm (5 ft 11 in)
- Weight: 73 kg (161 lb)

Sport
- Sport: Amateur wrestling
- Club: United Amateur Wrestling and Weightlifting Club, Clapham

Peter E. Amey (born 3 August 1935) is a British wrestler who competed at the 1960 Summer Olympics.

== Biography ==
At the 1960 Olympic Games in Rome, he participated in the men's freestyle welterweight.

Amey represented the England team at the 1962 British Empire and Commonwealth Games in Perth, Australia. He competed in the 68 kg welterweight event.

Eight years later he participated in the 1970 British Commonwealth Games in Edinburgh, Scotland.

Amey was a five-times winner of the British Wrestling Championships in 1961, 1962, 1967, 1969 and 1970.
