= Nikola Vasilev Dimitrov =

Bulgarian wrestler

Personal information
- Nationality: Bulgarian
- Born: 11 December 1939 (age 86) Golijzna, Bulgaria

Sport
- Sport: Wrestling

Nikola Vasilev Dimitrov (born 11 December 1939) is a Bulgarian wrestler. He competed in the men's freestyle flyweight at the 1960 Summer Olympics.
