= Kurt Boese =

Canadian wrestler (1929–2021)

Personal information
- Nationality: Canadian
- Born: 4 November 1929 Bremen, Germany
- Died: 21 September 2021 (aged 91) Kitchener, Ontario, Canada

Sport
- Sport: Wrestling

Kurt Boese (4 November 1929 – 21 September 2021) was a Canadian wrestler. He competed in the men's freestyle welterweight at the 1960 Summer Olympics.
