= Choi Myong-jong =

South Korean wrestler

Personal information
- Nationality: South Korean
- Born: 6 May 1933 (age 93) Seoul, South Korea

Sport
- Sport: Wrestling

Choi Myong-jong (born 6 May 1933) is a South Korean wrestler. He competed in the men's freestyle welterweight at the 1960 Summer Olympics.
