= Bengt Frännfors =

Swedish wrestler (born 1936)

Personal information
- Nationality: Swedish
- Born: 26 February 1936 (age 90) Vittangi, Sweden

Sport
- Sport: Wrestling

Bengt Frännfors (born 26 February 1936) is a Swedish wrestler. He competed in two events at the 1960 Summer Olympics.
