= Åke Carlsson =

Swedish wrestler

Personal information
- Nationality: Swedish
- Born: 24 October 1936 Arboga, Sweden
- Died: 21 April 2007 (aged 70) Huskvarna, Sweden

Sport
- Sport: Wrestling

Åke Evert Carlsson (24 October 1936 – 21 April 2007) was a Swedish wrestler. He competed in the men's freestyle welterweight at the 1960 Summer Olympics.
