= Paul Neff =

German wrestler (born 1938)

Personal information
- Nationality: German
- Born: 10 January 1938 (age 87); Schifferstadt, Germany

Sport
- Sport: Wrestling

Paul Neff (born 10 January 1938) is a German wrestler. He competed at the 1960 Summer Olympics, the 1964 Summer Olympics and the 1968 Summer Olympics.
