= Karl Bruggmann =

Swiss wrestler (1935–2022)

Personal information
- Nationality: Swiss
- Born: 29 July 1935 Lucerne, Switzerland
- Died: 8 May 2022 (aged 86)

Sport
- Sport: Wrestling

Karl Bruggmann (29 July 1935 – 8 May 2022) was a Swiss wrestler. He competed in the men's freestyle welterweight at the 1960 Summer Olympics.
