= Martin Heinze (wrestler) =

German wrestler (born 1939)

Personal information
- Nationality: German
- Born: 5 January 1939 (age 86) Belkau, Germany

Sport
- Sport: Wrestling

Martin Heinze (born 5 January 1939) is a German wrestler. He competed at the 1960 Summer Olympics, the 1964 Summer Olympics and the 1968 Summer Olympics.
