= Din Nawab =

Pakistani wrestler (born 1935)

Personal information
- Nationality: Pakistani
- Born: 23 October 1935 (age 90) Lahore, Pakistan

Sport
- Sport: Wrestling

Din Nawab (born 23 October 1935) is a former wrestler from Pakistan. He competed in the men's freestyle flyweight event held at Ikada Sports Hall, in Rome, at the 1960 Summer Olympics.
