= Ebrahim Seifpour =

Iranian wrestler (born 1938)

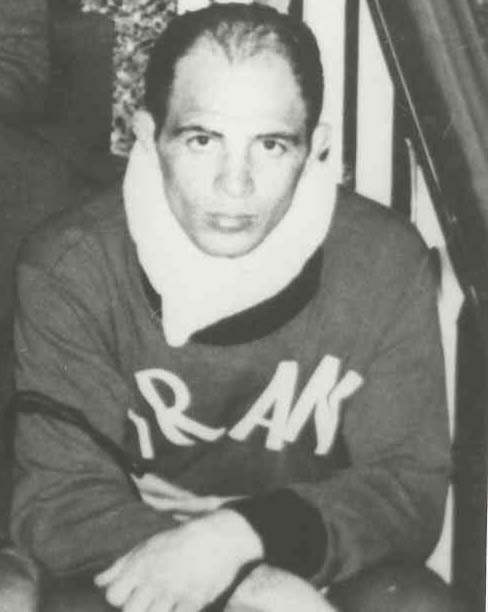
- Seifpour in 1961

Personal information
- Born: 3 March 1938 (age 88) Tehran, Imperial State of Iran
- Height: 161 cm (5 ft 3 in)

Sport
- Sport: Freestyle wrestling
- Club: Teheran Ulad
Medal record
Representing Iran
Olympic Games
Bronze medal – third place	1960 Rome	52 kg
World Championships
Gold medal – first place	1961 Yokohama	57 kg
Gold medal – first place	1965 Manchester	63 kg
Silver medal – second place	1963 Sofia	63 kg
Asian Games
Silver medal – second place	1966 Bangkok	63 kg

Mohammad Ebrahim Seifpour Saadabadi (Persian: محمد ابراهیم سیف پور سعد آبادی; born 3 March 1938) also known as Ebrahim Seifpour, is a retired Iranian freestyle wrestler. He competed at the 1960 and 1964 Olympics and placed third and sixth, respectively. At the world championships he won two gold and one silver medals in 1961–65. After retiring from competitions he worked as a wrestling coach and official.
