= Seán O'Connor (wrestler) =

Irish wrestler, Olympic Games participant

Personal information
- Nationality: Northern Irish
- Born: July 26, 1937 Belfast, Northern Ireland
- Died: 3 September 2012 (aged 75) County Mayo, Ireland
- Height: 156 cm (5 ft 1 in)
- Weight: 52 kg (115 lb)

Sport
- Sport: Wrestling

Seán O'Connor (26 July 1937 - 3 September 2012) was an Irish wrestler. He competed at the 1960 Summer Olympics and the 1964 Summer Olympics. He was born as John O'Connor but was better known as Seán when competing.

O'Connor was a three-times winner of the British Wrestling Championships in 1960, 1963 and 1964.
