= Gaetano De Vescovi =

Italian wrestler

Personal information
- Nationality: Italian
- Born: 14 November 1937; Trieste, Italy
- Died: 28 October 2017 (aged 79)

Sport
- Sport: Wrestling

Gaetano De Vescovi (14 November 1937 – 28 October 2017) was an Italian wrestler. He competed at the 1960 Summer Olympics and the 1964 Summer Olympics.
