= Ahmet Bilek =

Turkish wrestler (1932–1970)

Medal record

Men's freestyle wrestling

Representing Turkey

Olympic Games
Gold medal – first place	1960 Rome	52 kg

World Championships
Silver medal – second place	Tehran	52 kg

Balkan Championships
Silver medal – second place	1960 Burgas	52 kg

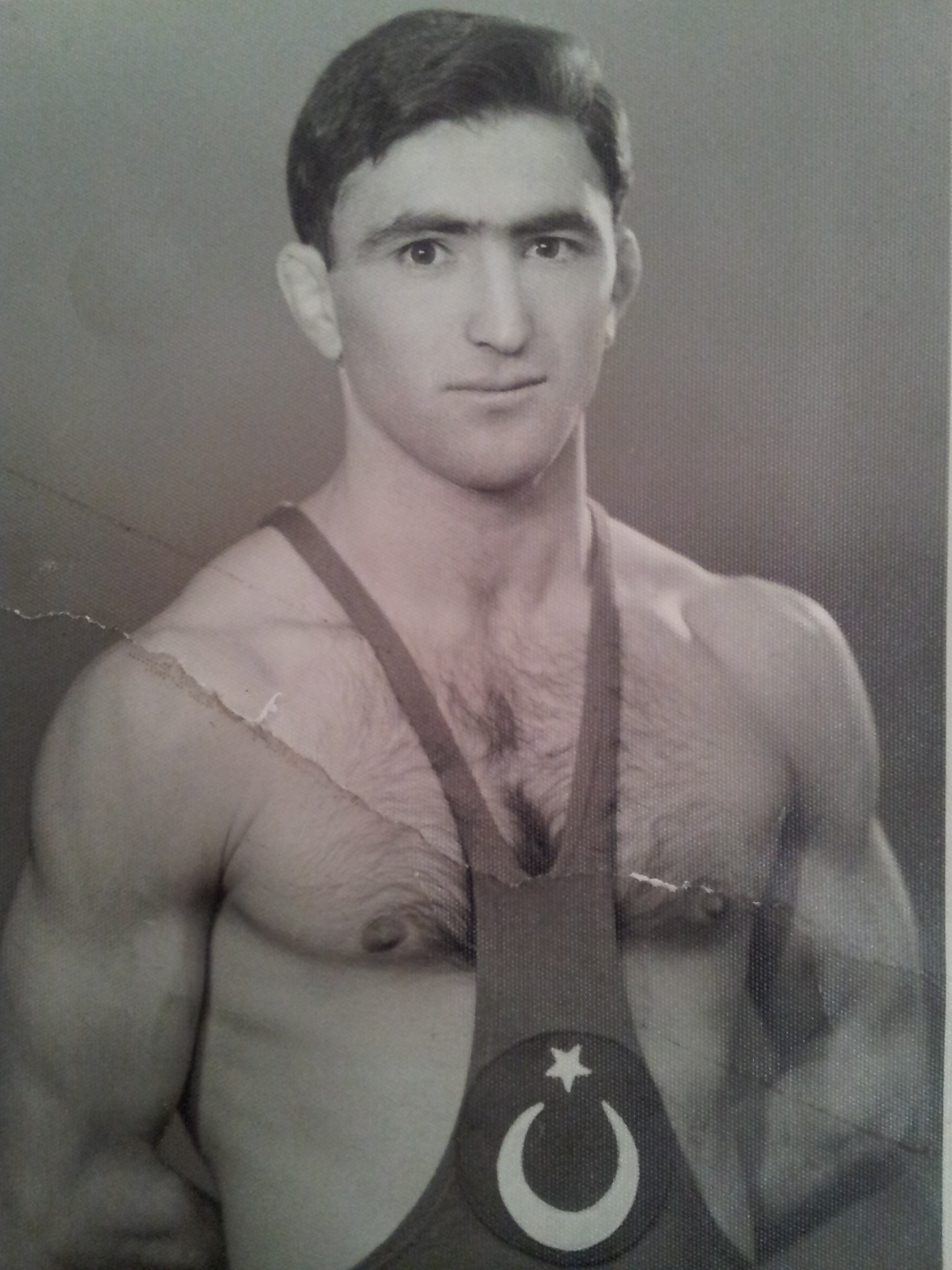

Olympic medal record

Men's Greco-Roman wrestling

Representing Turkey

World Championships
Silver medal – second place	1953 Napoli	52 kg

Mediterranean Games
Gold medal – first place	1955 Barcelona	52 kg

Ahmet Bilek (15 March 1932 in Kula, Manisa, Turkey – 4 October 1970 in Saarbrücken, Germany) was a Turkish Olympic champion sports wrestler in the flyweight class (52 kg) and a trainer. He won the gold medal in men's freestyle wrestling at the 1960 Olympics.

He was born in 1932 in the western Turkish town of Kula in Manisa Province.

After his successful participation at the Olympics in Rome, Ahmet Bilek emigrated to Germany following his teammates Mithat Bayrak and Müzahir Sille. He continued his sports career in the wrestling club KSV Köllerbach in Püttlingen, a small town near Saarbrücken and became German champion in 1966 and 1968.

Ahmet Bilek committed suicide in 1970 in Germany.

He was married to Ayten and had a son Ali and a daughter Sevil.

== Achievements ==
- 1953 World Wrestling Championships in Naples, Italy - silver (Greco-Roman Flyweight)
- 1955 Mediterranean Games in Barcelona, Spain - gold (Greco-Roman Flyweight)
- 1959 World Wrestling Championships in Tehran, Iran - silver (Freestyle Flyweight)
- 1960 Balkan Wrestling Championships in Burgas, Bulgaria - silver (Freestyle Flyweight)
- 1960 Summer Olympics in Rome, Italy - gold (Freestyle Flyweight)
