= Masayuki Matsubara =

Japanese freestyle wrestler

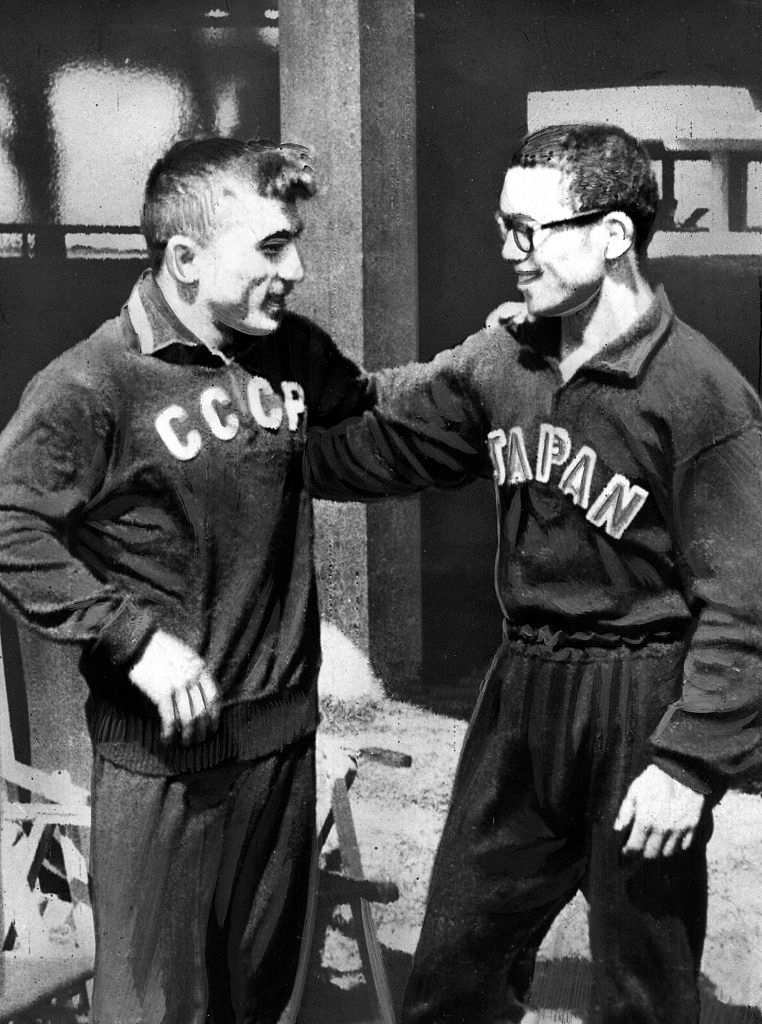
- Matsubara (right) at the 1960 Olympics

Personal information
- Born: February 7, 1939 (age 87) Miyagi Prefecture, Japan
- Height: 159 cm (5 ft 3 in)

Sport
- Sport: Freestyle wrestling
Medal record
Representing Japan
Olympic Games
Silver medal – second place	1960 Rome	52 kg

Masayuki Matsubara (松原 正之, Matsubara Masayuki; born February 7, 1939) is a retired Japanese freestyle wrestler. He won a silver medal at the 1960 Olympics and placed fifth at the 1961 World Championship.
