= Wrestling at the 1960 Summer Olympics – Men's Greco-Roman heavyweight =

Wrestling at the Olympics

Men's Greco-Roman heavyweight at the Games of the XVII Olympiad
- Venue: Basilica of Maxentius
- Dates: 26–31 August 1960
- Competitors: 12 from 12 nations

Medalists
1st place, gold medalist(s)		Ivan Bohdan	Soviet Union
2nd place, silver medalist(s)		Wilfried Dietrich	United Team of Germany
3rd place, bronze medalist(s)		Bohumil Kubát	Czechoslovakia

The men's Greco-Roman heavyweight competition at the 1960 Summer Olympics in Rome took place from August 26 to 31 at the Basilica of Maxentius. Nations were limited to one competitor. Heavyweight was the heaviest category, including wrestlers weighing over 87 kilograms (191.8 lb).

== Competition format ==
This Greco-Roman wrestling competition continued to use the "bad points" elimination system introduced at the 1928 Summer Olympics for Greco-Roman and at the 1932 Summer Olympics for freestyle wrestling, though adjusted the point values slightly. Wins by fall continued to be worth zero points and wins by decision continued to be worth one point. Losses by fall, however, were now worth four points (up from three). Losses by decision were worth three points (consistent with most prior years, though in some losses by split decision had been worth only two points). Ties were now allowed, worth two points for each wrestler. The elimination threshold was also increased from five points to six points. The medal round concept, used in 1952 and 1956 requiring a round-robin amongst the medalists even if one or more finished a round with enough points for elimination, was used only if exactly three wrestlers remained after a round—if two competitors remained, they faced off head-to-head; if only one, he was the gold medalist.

== Results ==
=== Round 1 ===
Bouts

Winner	Nation	Victory Type	Loser	Nation
István Kozma	Hungary	Decision	Dale Lewis	United States
Radoslav Kasabov	Bulgaria	Decision	Adelmo Bulgarelli	Italy
Lucjan Sosnowski	Poland	Decision	Viktor Ahven	Finland
Bohumil Kubát	Czechoslovakia	Fall	Kanji Shigeoka	Japan
Wilfried Dietrich	United Team of Germany	Decision	Ragnar Svensson	Sweden
Ivan Bohdan	Soviet Union	Fall	Tan Tarı	Turkey

Points

Rank	Wrestler	Nation	Start	Earned	Total
1	Ivan Bohdan	Soviet Union	0	0	0
1	Bohumil Kubát	Czechoslovakia	0	0	0
3	Wilfried Dietrich	United Team of Germany	0	1	1
3	Radoslav Kasabov	Bulgaria	0	1	1
3	István Kozma	Hungary	0	1	1
3	Lucjan Sosnowski	Poland	0	1	1
7	Viktor Ahven	Finland	0	3	3
7	Adelmo Bulgarelli	Italy	0	3	3
7	Dale Lewis	United States	0	3	3
7	Ragnar Svensson	Sweden	0	3	3
10	Kanji Shigeoka	Japan	0	4	4
10	Tan Tarı	Turkey	0	4	4

=== Round 2 ===
Bouts

Winner	Nation	Victory Type	Loser	Nation
Adelmo Bulgarelli	Italy	Fall	Dale Lewis	United States
Radoslav Kasabov	Bulgaria	Decision	István Kozma	Hungary
Bohumil Kubát	Czechoslovakia	Decision	Viktor Ahven	Finland
Lucjan Sosnowski	Poland	Fall	Kanji Shigeoka	Japan
Ragnar Svensson	Sweden	Tie	Tan Tarı	Turkey
Wilfried Dietrich	United Team of Germany	Tie	Ivan Bohdan	Soviet Union

Points

Rank	Wrestler	Nation	Start	Earned	Total
1	Bohumil Kubát	Czechoslovakia	0	1	1
1	Lucjan Sosnowski	Poland	1	0	1
3	Ivan Bohdan	Soviet Union	0	2	2
3	Radoslav Kasabov	Bulgaria	1	1	2
5	Adelmo Bulgarelli	Italy	3	0	3
5	Wilfried Dietrich	United Team of Germany	1	2	3
7	István Kozma	Hungary	1	3	4
8	Ragnar Svensson	Sweden	3	2	5
9	Viktor Ahven	Finland	3	3	6
9	Tan Tarı	Turkey	4	2	6
11	Dale Lewis	United States	3	4	7
12	Kanji Shigeoka	Japan	4	4	8

=== Round 3 ===
Bouts

Winner	Nation	Victory Type	Loser	Nation
István Kozma	Hungary	Decision	Adelmo Bulgarelli	Italy
Radoslav Kasabov	Bulgaria	Tie	Lucjan Sosnowski	Poland
Bohumil Kubát	Czechoslovakia	Tie	Wilfried Dietrich	United Team of Germany
Ivan Bohdan	Soviet Union	Fall	Ragnar Svensson	Sweden

Points

Rank	Wrestler	Nation	Start	Earned	Total
1	Ivan Bohdan	Soviet Union	2	0	2
2	Bohumil Kubát	Czechoslovakia	1	2	3
2	Lucjan Sosnowski	Poland	1	2	3
4	Radoslav Kasabov	Bulgaria	2	2	4
5	Wilfried Dietrich	United Team of Germany	3	2	5
5	István Kozma	Hungary	4	1	5
7	Adelmo Bulgarelli	Italy	3	3	6
8	Ragnar Svensson	Sweden	5	4	9

=== Round 4 ===
Kubát, Bohdan, and Dietrich all remained uneliminated after this round (none having six or more points), but the three wrestlers had all faced each other—with ties between Bohdan and Dietrich in round 2, Dietrich and Kubát in round 3, and Kubát and Bohdan in this round. No more bouts were therefore possible, and the competition ended. Bohdan had the fewest points, at four, and therefore took the gold medal. Dietrich and Kubát were tied at five points, and had drawn their head-to-head bout. The tie was therefore broken by body weight, with Dietrich (the lighter man) winning the silver medal.

Kozma's victory over Sosnowski in this round also functioned as the tie-breaker between the two wrestlers for 4th place.

Bouts

Winner	Nation	Victory Type	Loser	Nation
István Kozma	Hungary	Decision	Lucjan Sosnowski	Poland
Wilfried Dietrich	United Team of Germany	Fall	Radoslav Kasabov	Bulgaria
Bohumil Kubát	Czechoslovakia	Tie	Ivan Bohdan	Soviet Union

Points

Rank	Wrestler	Nation	Start	Earned	Total
1st place, gold medalist(s)	Ivan Bohdan	Soviet Union	2	2	4
2nd place, silver medalist(s)	Wilfried Dietrich	United Team of Germany	5	0	5
3rd place, bronze medalist(s)	Bohumil Kubát	Czechoslovakia	3	2	5
4	István Kozma	Hungary	5	1	6
5	Lucjan Sosnowski	Poland	3	3	6
6	Radoslav Kasabov	Bulgaria	4	4	8
