= Wrestling at the 1964 Summer Olympics – Men's freestyle heavyweight =

Wrestling at the Olympics

Men's freestyle heavyweight at the Games of the XVIII Olympiad
- Venue: Komazawa Gymnasium
- Dates: 11–14 October 1964
- Competitors: 13 from 13 nations

Medalists
1st place, gold medalist(s)		Aleksandr Ivanitsky	Soviet Union
2nd place, silver medalist(s)		Lyutvi Akhmedov	Bulgaria
3rd place, bronze medalist(s)		Hamit Kaplan	Turkey

The men's freestyle heavyweight competition at the 1964 Summer Olympics in Tokyo took place from 11 to 14 October at the Komazawa Gymnasium. Nations were limited to one competitor. Heavyweight was the heaviest category, including wrestlers weighing over 97 kilograms (213.8 lb).

== Competition format ==
This freestyle wrestling competition continued to use the "bad points" elimination system introduced at the 1928 Summer Olympics for Greco-Roman and at the 1932 Summer Olympics for freestyle wrestling, as adjusted at the 1960 Summer Olympics. Each bout awarded 4 points. If the victory was by fall, the winner received 0 and the loser 4. If the victory was by decision, the winner received 1 and the loser 3. If the bout was tied, each wrestler received 2 points. A wrestler who accumulated 6 or more points was eliminated. Rounds continued until there were 3 or fewer uneliminated wrestlers. If only 1 wrestler remained, he received the gold medal. If 2 wrestlers remained, point totals were ignored and they faced each other for gold and silver (if they had already wrestled each other, that result was used). If 3 wrestlers remained, point totals were ignored and a round-robin was held among those 3 to determine medals (with previous head-to-head results, if any, counting for this round-robin).

== Results ==
=== Round 1 ===
Bouts

Winner	Nation	Victory Type	Loser	Nation
Hamit Kaplan	Turkey	Decision	Arne Robertsson	Sweden
Larry Kristoff	United States	Decision	Wilfried Dietrich	United Team of Germany
Aleksandr Ivanitsky	Soviet Union	Fall	Tserendonoin Sanjaa	Mongolia
Lyutvi Akhmedov	Bulgaria	Decision	János Reznák	Hungary
Bohumil Kubát	Czechoslovakia	Tie	Ştefan Stîngu	Romania
Ganpat Andhalkar	India	Decision	Denis McNamara	Great Britain
Masanori Saito	Japan	Bye	N/A	N/A

Points

Rank	Wrestler	Nation	R1
1	Aleksandr Ivanitsky	Soviet Union	0
1	Masanori Saito	Japan	0
3	Lyutvi Akhmedov	Bulgaria	1
3	Ganpat Andhalkar	India	1
3	Hamit Kaplan	Turkey	1
3	Larry Kristoff	United States	1
7	Bohumil Kubát	Czechoslovakia	2
7	Ştefan Stîngu	Romania	2
9	Arne Robertsson	Sweden	3
9	Wilfried Dietrich	United Team of Germany	3
9	János Reznák	Hungary	3
9	Denis McNamara	Great Britain	3
13	Tserendonoin Sanjaa	Mongolia	4

=== Round 2 ===
Only 1 of the 13 wrestlers was eliminated, in large part due to there being 3 ties in the first two rounds.

Bouts

Winner	Nation	Victory Type	Loser	Nation
Masanori Saito	Japan	Tie	Arne Robertsson	Sweden
Hamit Kaplan	Turkey	Tie	Wilfried Dietrich	United Team of Germany
Aleksandr Ivanitsky	Soviet Union	Decision	Larry Kristoff	United States
János Reznák	Hungary	Fall	Tserendonoin Sanjaa	Mongolia
Lyutvi Akhmedov	Bulgaria	Decision	Bohumil Kubát	Czechoslovakia
Ştefan Stîngu	Romania	Foul	Ganpat Andhalkar	India
Denis McNamara	Great Britain	Bye	N/A	N/A

Points

Rank	Wrestler	Nation	R1	R2	Total
1	Aleksandr Ivanitsky	Soviet Union	0	1	1
2	Lyutvi Akhmedov	Bulgaria	1	1	2
2	Masanori Saito	Japan	0	2	2
2	Ştefan Stîngu	Romania	2	0	2
5	Hamit Kaplan	Turkey	1	2	3
5	Denis McNamara	Great Britain	3	0	3
5	János Reznák	Hungary	3	0	3
8	Larry Kristoff	United States	1	3	4
9	Ganpat Andhalkar	India	1	4	5
9	Wilfried Dietrich	United Team of Germany	3	2	5
9	Bohumil Kubát	Czechoslovakia	2	3	5
9	Arne Robertsson	Sweden	3	2	5
13	Tserendonoin Sanjaa	Mongolia	4	4	8

=== Round 3 ===
Six of the 12 wrestlers were eliminated, including one who won during the round.

Bouts

Winner	Nation	Victory Type	Loser	Nation
Denis McNamara	Great Britain	Fall	Masanori Saito	Japan
Wilfried Dietrich	United Team of Germany	Decision	Arne Robertsson	Sweden
Hamit Kaplan	Turkey	Tie	Larry Kristoff	United States
Aleksandr Ivanitsky	Soviet Union	Fall	János Reznák	Hungary
Lyutvi Akhmedov	Bulgaria	Decision	Ştefan Stîngu	Romania
Bohumil Kubát	Czechoslovakia	Foul	Ganpat Andhalkar	India

Points

Rank	Wrestler	Nation	R1	R2	R3	Total
1	Aleksandr Ivanitsky	Soviet Union	0	1	0	1
2	Lyutvi Akhmedov	Bulgaria	1	1	1	3
2	Denis McNamara	Great Britain	3	0	0	3
4	Hamit Kaplan	Turkey	1	2	2	5
4	Bohumil Kubát	Czechoslovakia	2	3	0	5
4	Ştefan Stîngu	Romania	2	0	3	5
7	Wilfried Dietrich	United Team of Germany	3	2	1	6
7	Larry Kristoff	United States	1	3	2	6
7	Masanori Saito	Japan	0	2	4	6
10	János Reznák	Hungary	3	0	4	7
11	Arne Robertsson	Sweden	3	2	3	8
12	Ganpat Andhalkar	India	1	4	4	9

=== Round 4 ===
Akhmedov and McNamara started at 3 points each; the winner would continue while the loser would be eliminated (both would remain in with a draw). Akhmedov prevailed, eliminated McNamara. Kaplan and Kubát faced each other with both starting at 5 points; each needed to win by fall to stay in competition, so a tie eliminated both. Ivanitsky, starting at 1 point, was in no danger of elimination; his win over Stîngu eliminated the latter man.

Because McNamara, Kaplan, and Kubát tied for third place at 7 points, they moved to a round-robin for the bronze medal.

Bouts

Winner	Nation	Victory Type	Loser	Nation
Lyutvi Akhmedov	Bulgaria	Fall	Denis McNamara	Great Britain
Hamit Kaplan	Turkey	Tie	Bohumil Kubát	Czechoslovakia
Aleksandr Ivanitsky	Soviet Union	Decision	Ştefan Stîngu	Romania

Points

Rank	Wrestler	Nation	R1	R2	R3	R4	Total
1	Aleksandr Ivanitsky	Soviet Union	0	1	0	1	2
2	Lyutvi Akhmedov	Bulgaria	1	1	1	0	3
3	Denis McNamara	Great Britain	3	0	0	4	7
3	Hamit Kaplan	Turkey	1	2	2	2	7
3	Bohumil Kubát	Czechoslovakia	2	3	0	2	7
6	Ştefan Stîngu	Romania	2	0	3	3	8

=== Final round ===
Kaplan and Kubát tied in round 4; that result counted for the bronze medal round-robin. McNamara lost to both other wrestlers, finishing fifth. Kaplan took the bronze medal over Kubát based on lower body weight.

In the final, Akhmedov and Ivanitsky tied. Akhmedov had fewer total points throughout the tournament, so won the gold medal.

Bronze medal bouts

Winner	Nation	Victory Type	Loser	Nation
Hamit Kaplan	Turkey	Tie (Round 4)	Bohumil Kubát	Czechoslovakia
Bohumil Kubát	Czechoslovakia	Default	Denis McNamara	Great Britain
Hamit Kaplan	Turkey	Fall	Denis McNamara	Great Britain

Final

Winner	Nation	Victory Type	Loser	Nation
Aleksandr Ivanitsky	Soviet Union	Tie	Lyutvi Akhmedov	Bulgaria

Points

Rank	Wrestler	Nation	Points	R1	R2	R3	R4	FR	Total
1st place, gold medalist(s)	Aleksandr Ivanitsky	Soviet Union	2	0	1	0	1	2	4
2nd place, silver medalist(s)	Lyutvi Akhmedov	Bulgaria	2	1	1	1	0	2	5
3rd place, bronze medalist(s)	Hamit Kaplan	Turkey	2	1	2	2	2	0	7
4	Bohumil Kubát	Czechoslovakia	2	2	3	0	2	0	7
5	Denis McNamara	Great Britain	8	3	0	0	4	8	15
