= Wrestling at the 1964 Summer Olympics – Men's Greco-Roman heavyweight =

Wrestling at the Olympics

Men's Greco-Roman heavyweight at the Games of the XVIII Olympiad
- Venue: Komazawa Gymnasium
- Dates: 16–19 October 1964
- Competitors: 11 from 11 nations

Medalists
1st place, gold medalist(s)		István Kozma	Hungary
2nd place, silver medalist(s)		Anatoly Roshchin	Soviet Union
3rd place, bronze medalist(s)		Wilfried Dietrich	United Team of Germany

The men's Greco-Roman heavyweight competition at the 1964 Summer Olympics in Tokyo took place from 16 to 19 October at the Komazawa Gymnasium. Nations were limited to one competitor. Heavyweight was the heaviest category, including wrestlers weighing over 97 kilograms (213.8 lb).

== Competition format ==
This Greco-Roman wrestling competition continued to use the "bad points" elimination system introduced at the 1928 Summer Olympics for Greco-Roman and at the 1932 Summer Olympics for freestyle wrestling, as adjusted at the 1960 Summer Olympics. Each bout awarded 4 points. If the victory was by fall, the winner received 0 and the loser 4. If the victory was by decision, the winner received 1 and the loser 3. If the bout was tied, each wrestler received 2 points. A wrestler who accumulated 6 or more points was eliminated. Rounds continued until there were 3 or fewer uneliminated wrestlers. If only 1 wrestler remained, he received the gold medal. If 2 wrestlers remained, point totals were ignored and they faced each other for gold and silver (if they had already wrestled each other, that result was used). If 3 wrestlers remained, point totals were ignored and a round-robin was held among those 3 to determine medals (with previous head-to-head results, if any, counting for this round-robin).

== Results ==
=== Round 1 ===
Bouts

Winner	Nation	Victory Type	Loser	Nation
Radoslav Kasabov	Bulgaria	Tie	Ştefan Stîngu	Romania
Ragnar Svensson	Sweden	Decision	Bob Pickens	United States
Anatoly Roshchin	Soviet Union	Fall	Taisto Kangasniemi	Finland
Petr Kment	Czechoslovakia	Decision	Hamit Kaplan	Turkey
István Kozma	Hungary	Fall	Tsuneharu Sugiyama	Japan
Wilfried Dietrich	United Team of Germany	Bye	N/A	N/A

Points

Rank	Wrestler	Nation	R1
1	Wilfried Dietrich	United Team of Germany	0
1	István Kozma	Hungary	0
1	Anatoly Roshchin	Soviet Union	0
4	Petr Kment	Czechoslovakia	1
4	Ragnar Svensson	Sweden	1
6	Radoslav Kasabov	Bulgaria	2
6	Ştefan Stîngu	Romania	2
8	Hamit Kaplan	Turkey	3
8	Bob Pickens	United States	3
10	Taisto Kangasniemi	Finland	4
10	Tsuneharu Sugiyama	Japan	4

=== Round 2 ===
Kaplan and Kangasniemi were eliminated after losses in each of the first two rounds. Kozma had two wins by fall and stayed at 0 points to lead the group.

Bouts

Winner	Nation	Victory Type	Loser	Nation
Wilfried Dietrich	United Team of Germany	Decision	Radoslav Kasabov	Bulgaria
Bob Pickens	United States	Fall	Taisto Kangasniemi	Finland
Ragnar Svensson	Sweden	Decision	Ştefan Stîngu	Romania
Anatoly Roshchin	Soviet Union	Decision	Petr Kment	Czechoslovakia
István Kozma	Hungary	Default	Hamit Kaplan	Turkey
Tsuneharu Sugiyama	Japan	Bye	N/A	N/A

Points

Rank	Wrestler	Nation	R1	R2	Total
1	István Kozma	Hungary	0	0	0
2	Wilfried Dietrich	United Team of Germany	0	1	1
2	Anatoly Roshchin	Soviet Union	0	1	1
4	Ragnar Svensson	Sweden	1	1	2
5	Bob Pickens	United States	3	0	3
6	Petr Kment	Czechoslovakia	1	3	4
6	Tsuneharu Sugiyama	Japan	4	0	4
8	Radoslav Kasabov	Bulgaria	2	3	5
8	Ştefan Stîngu	Romania	2	3	5
10	Hamit Kaplan	Turkey	3	4	7
11	Taisto Kangasniemi	Finland	4	4	8

=== Round 3 ===
Kozma had a bye and stayed at 0 points. Dietrich and Roshchin each won by fall and stayed near Kozma at 1 point apiece, insulating the three men from possible elimination for another round. Svensson picked up a 3rd point and Dietrich stayed at 4. All four bout losers in this round were eliminated.

Bouts

Winner	Nation	Victory Type	Loser	Nation
Wilfried Dietrich	United Team of Germany	Fall	Tsuneharu Sugiyama	Japan
Ragnar Svensson	Sweden	Decision	Radoslav Kasabov	Bulgaria
Anatoly Roshchin	Soviet Union	Fall	Ştefan Stîngu	Romania
Petr Kment	Czechoslovakia	Fall	Bob Pickens	United States
István Kozma	Hungary	Bye	N/A	N/A

Points

Rank	Wrestler	Nation	R1	R2	R3	Total
1	István Kozma	Hungary	0	0	0	0
2	Wilfried Dietrich	United Team of Germany	0	1	0	1
2	Anatoly Roshchin	Soviet Union	0	1	0	1
4	Ragnar Svensson	Sweden	1	1	1	3
5	Petr Kment	Czechoslovakia	1	3	0	4
6	Bob Pickens	United States	3	0	4	7
7	Radoslav Kasabov	Bulgaria	2	3	3	8
7	Tsuneharu Sugiyama	Japan	4	0	4	8
9	Ştefan Stîngu	Romania	2	3	4	9

=== Round 4 ===
With Kment on a bye and Kozma, Dietrich, and Roshchin each at 1 point or fewer, Svensson was the only wrestler who could potentially be eliminated in this round. He needed a win or tie to stay in competition, but lost to Roshchin to be eliminated. Kozma got his first point, Roshchin his second, and Dietrich received 3 points to move to 4 total

Bouts

Winner	Nation	Victory Type	Loser	Nation
István Kozma	Hungary	Decision	Wilfried Dietrich	United Team of Germany
Anatoly Roshchin	Soviet Union	Decision	Ragnar Svensson	Sweden
Petr Kment	Czechoslovakia	Bye	N/A	N/A

Points

Rank	Wrestler	Nation	R1	R2	R3	R4	Total
1	István Kozma	Hungary	0	0	0	1	1
2	Anatoly Roshchin	Soviet Union	0	1	0	1	2
3	Wilfried Dietrich	United Team of Germany	0	1	0	3	4
3	Petr Kment	Czechoslovakia	1	3	0	0	4
5	Ragnar Svensson	Sweden	1	1	1	3	6

=== Round 5 ===
Kozma eliminated Kment and Roshchin eliminated Dietrich, setting up a gold medal bout between the two winners.

Bouts

Winner	Nation	Victory Type	Loser	Nation
István Kozma	Hungary	Fall	Petr Kment	Czechoslovakia
Anatoly Roshchin	Soviet Union	Decision	Wilfried Dietrich	United Team of Germany

Points

Rank	Wrestler	Nation	R1	R2	R3	R4	R5	Total
1	István Kozma	Hungary	0	0	0	1	0	1
2	Anatoly Roshchin	Soviet Union	0	1	0	1	1	3
3rd place, bronze medalist(s)	Wilfried Dietrich	United Team of Germany	0	1	0	3	3	7
4	Petr Kment	Czechoslovakia	1	3	0	0	4	8

=== Final round ===
In the gold medal match, Kozma and Roshchin were equal. The tie-breaker went to Kozma on total points throughout the tournament.

Bouts

Winner	Nation	Victory Type	Loser	Nation
István Kozma	Hungary	Tie	Anatoly Roshchin	Soviet Union

Points

Rank	Wrestler	Nation	Points	R1	R2	R3	R4	R5	FR	Total
1st place, gold medalist(s)	István Kozma	Hungary	2	0	0	0	1	0	2	3
2nd place, silver medalist(s)	Anatoly Roshchin	Soviet Union	2	0	1	0	1	1	2	5
