= Wrestling at the 1960 Summer Olympics – Men's freestyle heavyweight =

Wrestling at the Olympics

Men's freestyle heavyweight at the Games of the XVII Olympiad
- Venue: Basilica of Maxentius
- Dates: 1–6 September 1960
- Competitors: 17 from 17 nations

Medalists
1st place, gold medalist(s)		Wilfried Dietrich	United Team of Germany
2nd place, silver medalist(s)		Hamit Kaplan	Turkey
3rd place, bronze medalist(s)		Savkuz Dzarasov	Soviet Union

The men's freestyle heavyweight competition at the 1960 Summer Olympics in Rome took place from 1 to 6 September at the Basilica of Maxentius. Nations were limited to one competitor. Heavyweight was the heaviest category, including wrestlers weighing over 87 kilograms (191.8 lb).

== Competition format ==
This freestyle wrestling competition continued to use the "bad points" elimination system introduced at the 1928 Summer Olympics for Greco-Roman and at the 1932 Summer Olympics for freestyle wrestling, though adjusted the point values slightly. Wins by fall continued to be worth 0 points and wins by decision continued to be worth 1 point. Losses by fall, however, were now worth 4 points (up from 3). Losses by decision were worth 3 points (consistent with most prior years, though in some losses by split decision had been worth only 2 points). Ties were now allowed, worth 2 points for each wrestler. The elimination threshold was also increased from 5 points to 6 points. The medal round concept, used in 1952 and 1956 requiring a round-robin amongst the medalists even if one or more finished a round with enough points for elimination, was used only if exactly three wrestlers remained after a round—if two competitors remained, they faced off head-to-head; if only one, he was the gold medalist.

== Results ==
=== Round 1 ===
Bouts

Winner	Nation	Victory Type	Loser	Nation
Savkuz Dzarasov	Soviet Union	Fall	Kaoru Ishiguro	Japan
Yaqub-Ali Shourvarzi	Iran	Fall	Max Ordman	South Africa
Bertil Antonsson	Sweden	Fall	Max Widmer	Switzerland
Wilfried Dietrich	United Team of Germany	Fall	Ray Mitchell	Australia
János Reznák	Hungary	Decision	William Kerslake	United States
Ken Richmond	Great Britain	Fall	Nizam-ud-din Subhani	Afghanistan
Lyutvi Akhmedov	Bulgaria	Fall	Muhammad Nazir	Pakistan
Hamit Kaplan	Turkey	Fall	Lucjan Sosnowski	Poland
Pietro Marascalchi	Italy	Bye	N/A	N/A

Points

Rank	Wrestler	Nation	Start	Earned	Total
1	Lyutvi Akhmedov	Bulgaria	0	0	0
1	Bertil Antonsson	Sweden	0	0	0
1	Wilfried Dietrich	United Team of Germany	0	0	0
1	Savkuz Dzarasov	Soviet Union	0	0	0
1	Hamit Kaplan	Turkey	0	0	0
1	Pietro Marascalchi	Italy	0	0	0
1	Ken Richmond	Great Britain	0	0	0
1	Yaqub-Ali Shourvarzi	Iran	0	0	0
9	János Reznák	Hungary	0	1	1
10	William Kerslake	United States	0	3	3
11	Kaoru Ishiguro	Japan	0	4	4
11	Ray Mitchell	Australia	0	4	4
11	Muhammad Nazir	Pakistan	0	4	4
11	Max Ordman	South Africa	0	4	4
11	Lucjan Sosnowski	Poland	0	4	4
11	Nizam-ud-din Subhani	Afghanistan	0	4	4
11	Max Widmer	Switzerland	0	4	4

=== Round 2 ===
Bouts

Winner	Nation	Victory Type	Loser	Nation
Pietro Marascalchi	Italy	Fall	Kaoru Ishiguro	Japan
Savkuz Dzarasov	Soviet Union	Fall	Yaqub-Ali Shourvarzi	Iran
Bertil Antonsson	Sweden	Fall	Max Ordman	South Africa
Wilfried Dietrich	United Team of Germany	Fall	Max Widmer	Switzerland
Ray Mitchell	Australia	Tie	János Reznák	Hungary
William Kerslake	United States	Fall	Ken Richmond	Great Britain
Muhammad Nazir	Pakistan	Decision	Nizam-ud-din Subhani	Afghanistan
Lyutvi Akhmedov	Bulgaria	Tie	Hamit Kaplan	Turkey
Lucjan Sosnowski	Poland	Bye	N/A	N/A

Points

Rank	Wrestler	Nation	Start	Earned	Total
1	Bertil Antonsson	Sweden	0	0	0
1	Wilfried Dietrich	United Team of Germany	0	0	0
1	Savkuz Dzarasov	Soviet Union	0	0	0
1	Pietro Marascalchi	Italy	0	0	0
5	Lyutvi Akhmedov	Bulgaria	0	2	2
5	Hamit Kaplan	Turkey	0	2	2
7	William Kerslake	United States	3	0	3
7	János Reznák	Hungary	1	2	3
9	Ken Richmond	Great Britain	0	4	4
9	Yaqub-Ali Shourvarzi	Iran	0	4	4
9	Lucjan Sosnowski	Poland	4	0	4
12	Muhammad Nazir	Pakistan	4	1	5
13	Ray Mitchell	Australia	4	2	6
14	Nizam-ud-din Subhani	Afghanistan	4	3	7
15	Kaoru Ishiguro	Japan	4	4	8
15	Max Ordman	South Africa	4	4	8
15	Max Widmer	Switzerland	4	4	8

=== Round 3 ===
Bouts

Winner	Nation	Victory Type	Loser	Nation
Pietro Marascalchi	Italy	Fall	Lucjan Sosnowski	Poland
Savkuz Dzarasov	Soviet Union	Fall	Bertil Antonsson	Sweden
Wilfried Dietrich	United Team of Germany	Fall	Yaqub-Ali Shourvarzi	Iran
János Reznák	Hungary	Decision	Ken Richmond	Great Britain
William Kerslake	United States	Tie	Lyutvi Akhmedov	Bulgaria
Hamit Kaplan	Turkey	Fall	Muhammad Nazir	Pakistan

Points

Rank	Wrestler	Nation	Start	Earned	Total
1	Wilfried Dietrich	United Team of Germany	0	0	0
1	Savkuz Dzarasov	Soviet Union	0	0	0
1	Pietro Marascalchi	Italy	0	0	0
4	Hamit Kaplan	Turkey	2	0	2
5	Lyutvi Akhmedov	Bulgaria	2	2	4
5	Bertil Antonsson	Sweden	0	4	4
5	János Reznák	Hungary	3	1	4
8	William Kerslake	United States	3	2	5
9	Ken Richmond	Great Britain	4	3	7
10	Yaqub-Ali Shourvarzi	Iran	4	4	8
10	Lucjan Sosnowski	Poland	4	4	8
12	Muhammad Nazir	Pakistan	5	4	9

=== Round 4 ===
Bouts

Winner	Nation	Victory Type	Loser	Nation
Savkuz Dzarasov	Soviet Union	Fall	Pietro Marascalchi	Italy
Wilfried Dietrich	United Team of Germany	Decision	Bertil Antonsson	Sweden
János Reznák	Hungary	Tie	Lyutvi Akhmedov	Bulgaria
Hamit Kaplan	Turkey	Decision	William Kerslake	United States

Points

Rank	Wrestler	Nation	Start	Earned	Total
1	Savkuz Dzarasov	Soviet Union	0	0	0
2	Wilfried Dietrich	United Team of Germany	0	1	1
3	Hamit Kaplan	Turkey	2	1	3
4	Pietro Marascalchi	Italy	0	4	4
5	Lyutvi Akhmedov	Bulgaria	4	2	6
5	János Reznák	Hungary	4	2	6
7	Bertil Antonsson	Sweden	4	3	7
8	William Kerslake	United States	5	3	8

=== Round 5 ===
Bouts

Winner	Nation	Victory Type	Loser	Nation
Wilfried Dietrich	United Team of Germany	Fall	Pietro Marascalchi	Italy
Savkuz Dzarasov	Soviet Union	Tie	Hamit Kaplan	Turkey

Points

Rank	Wrestler	Nation	Start	Earned	Total
1	Wilfried Dietrich	United Team of Germany	1	0	1
2	Savkuz Dzarasov	Soviet Union	0	2	2
3	Hamit Kaplan	Turkey	3	2	5
4	Pietro Marascalchi	Italy	4	4	8

=== Round 6 ===
With three wrestlers left, the remaining men used a round-robin to determine medals rather than giving one competitor a bye in round 6. Kaplan and Dzarasov had tied in round 5. Dietrich defeated Dzarasov then tied Kaplan, finishing with the best record against the other medalists to take the gold medal. Kaplan's two ties gave him the silver medal, while Dzarasov's loss and tie earned bronze.

Bouts

Winner	Nation	Victory Type	Loser	Nation
Wilfried Dietrich	United Team of Germany	Fall	Savkuz Dzarasov	Soviet Union
Wilfried Dietrich	United Team of Germany	Tie	Hamit Kaplan	Turkey

Points

Rank	Wrestler	Nation	Start	Earned	Total	Vs. Medalists
1st place, gold medalist(s)	Wilfried Dietrich	United Team of Germany	1	2	3	2
2nd place, silver medalist(s)	Hamit Kaplan	Turkey	5	2	7	4
3rd place, bronze medalist(s)	Savkuz Dzarasov	Soviet Union	2	4	6	6
