= Wrestling at the 1972 Summer Olympics – Men's Greco-Roman +100 kg =

Men's Greco-Roman +100 kg at the Games of the XX Olympiad
- Venue: Messe München
- Dates: 6–10 September 1972
- Competitors: 12 from 12 nations

Medalists
1st place, gold medalist(s)		Anatoly Roshchin	Soviet Union
2nd place, silver medalist(s)		Aleksandar Tomov	Bulgaria
3rd place, bronze medalist(s)		Victor Dolipschi	Romania

The men's Greco-Roman +100 kg at the 1972 Summer Olympics as part of the wrestling program at the Fairgrounds, Judo and Wrestling Hall.

== Medalists ==
Gold	Anatoly Roshchin; Soviet Union
Silver	Aleksandar Tomov; Bulgaria
Bronze	Victor Dolipschi; Romania

== Tournament results ==
The competition used a form of negative points tournament, with negative points given for any result short of a fall. Accumulation of 6 negative points eliminated the wrestler. When only two or three wrestlers remain, a special final round is used to determine the order of the medals.

Legend

- DNA — Did not appear
- TPP — Total penalty points
- MPP — Match penalty points

Penalties

- 0 — Won by Fall, Passivity, Injury and Forfeit
- 0.5 — Won by Technical Superiority
- 1 — Won by Points
- 2 — Draw
- 2.5 — Draw, Passivity
- 3 — Lost by Points
- 3.5 — Lost by Technical Superiority
- 4 — Lost by Fall, Passivity, Injury and Forfeit

=== Round 1 ===
In the freestyle super heavyweight, Chris Taylor was controversially defeated by two-time defending and eventual gold medalist Alexander Medved. It appeared Medved was stalling but the referee awarded a point to the Soviet, charging Taylor with a lack of action. Later admitting that he felt sorry for Medved because of Taylor's size, the referee was dismissed from the Olympic tournament and banned from international officiating. In the Greco-Roman competition, Taylor was unexpectedly suplexed and pinned by a much lighter Wilfried Dietrich, whom he defeated a week before in the freestyle contest.

TPP	MPP		Time		MPP	TPP
0	0	Ištvan Semeredi (YUG)	3:47	Miguel Zambrano (PER)	4	4
4	4	Tomomi Tsuruta (JPN)	6:46	József Csatári (HUN)	0	0
4	4	Chris Taylor (USA)	3:14	Wilfried Dietrich (FRG)	0	0
0	0	Petr Kment (TCH)	8:21	Raimo Karlsson (FIN)	4	4
4	4	Victor Dolipschi (ROU)	7:39	Anatoly Roshchin (URS)	0	0
4	4	Edward Wojda (POL)	5:59	Aleksandar Tomov (BUL)	0	0

=== Round 2 ===
TPP	MPP		Time		MPP	TPP
0	0	Ištvan Semeredi (YUG)	7:48	Tomomi Tsuruta (JPN)	4	8
8	4	Miguel Zambrano (PER)	5:55	József Csatári (HUN)	0	0
8	4	Chris Taylor (USA)	7:50	Petr Kment (TCH)	4	4
0	0	Wilfried Dietrich (FRG)	6:39	Raimo Karlsson (FIN)	4	8
4	0	Victor Dolipschi (ROU)	1:36	Edward Wojda (POL)	4	8
1	1	Anatoly Roshchin (URS)		Aleksandar Tomov (BUL)	3	3

=== Round 3 ===
TPP	MPP		Time		MPP	TPP
4	4	Ištvan Semeredi (YUG)	5:54	József Csatári (HUN)	4	4
4	4	Wilfried Dietrich (FRG)	8:10	Victor Dolipschi (ROU)	0	4
7	3	Petr Kment (TCH)		Anatoly Roshchin (URS)	1	2
3		Aleksandar Tomov (BUL)		Bye		

=== Round 4 ===
TPP	MPP		Time		MPP	TPP
3	0	Aleksandar Tomov (BUL)	0:29	Ištvan Semeredi (YUG)	4	8
8	4	József Csatári (HUN)	6:54	Victor Dolipschi (ROU)	0	4
8	4	Wilfried Dietrich (FRG)	0:00	Anatoly Roshchin (URS)	0	0

=== Final ===
Results from the preliminary round are carried forward into the final (shown in yellow).

TPP	MPP		Time		MPP	TPP
	4	Victor Dolipschi (ROU)	7:39	Anatoly Roshchin (URS)	0	
1	1	Anatoly Roshchin (URS)		Aleksandar Tomov (BUL)	3	
5	2	Aleksandar Tomov (BUL)		Victor Dolipschi (ROU)	2	6

== Final standings ==
1. Anatoly Roshchin (URS)
2. Aleksandar Tomov (BUL)
3. Victor Dolipschi (ROU)
4. Ištvan Semeredi (YUG), József Csatári (HUN) and Wilfried Dietrich (FRG)
