= List of Finnish sportspeople =

This is a partial list of Finnish sportspeople. For the full plain list of Finnish sportspeople on Wikipedia, see Category:Finnish sportspeople.

== Alpine skiing ==
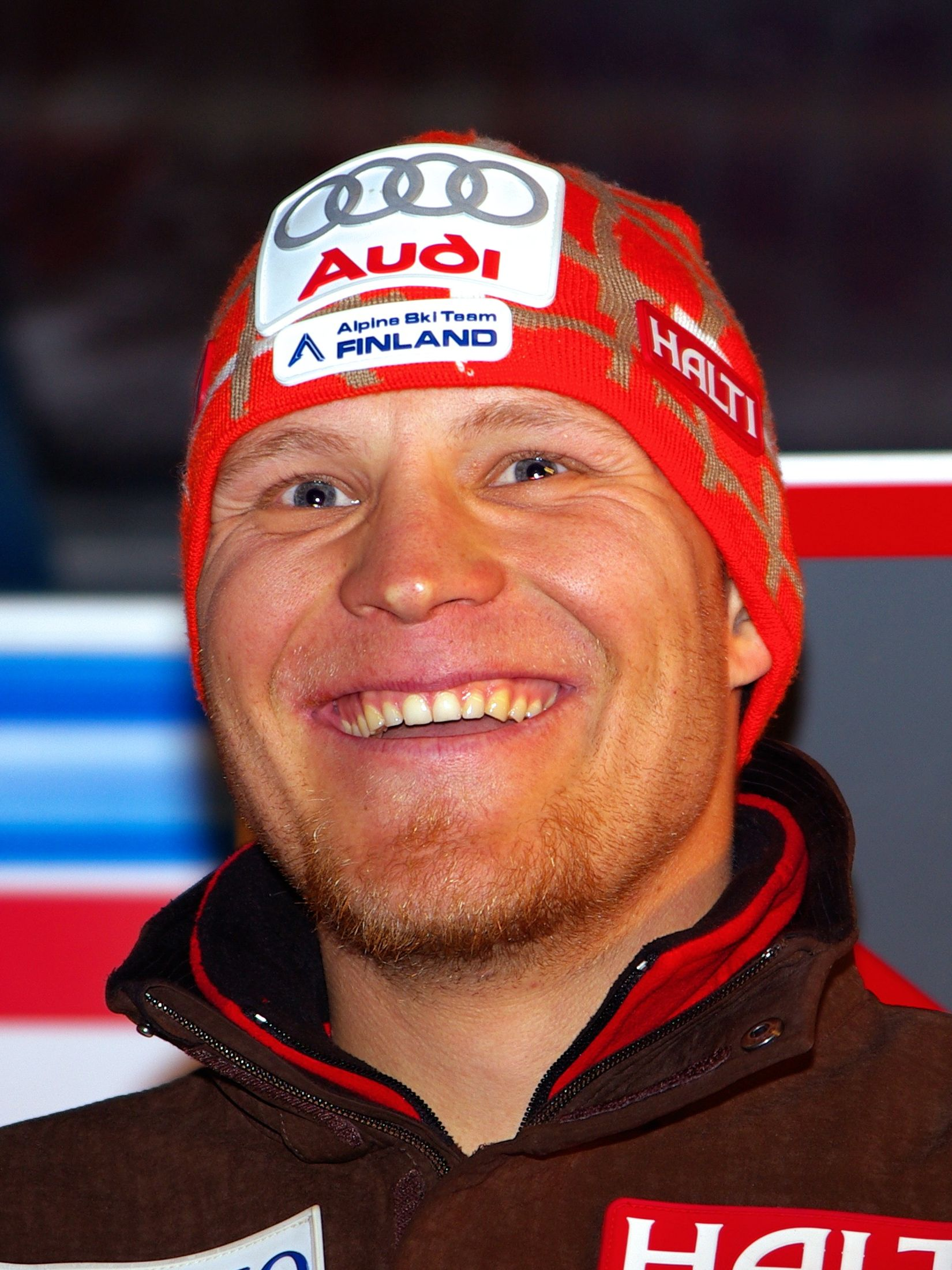
Kalle Palander

- Nina Ehrnrooth
- Riikka Honkanen
- Nette Kiviranta
- Sanni Leinonen
- Tarja Mulari
- Kalle Palander
- Tanja Poutiainen

== Archery ==
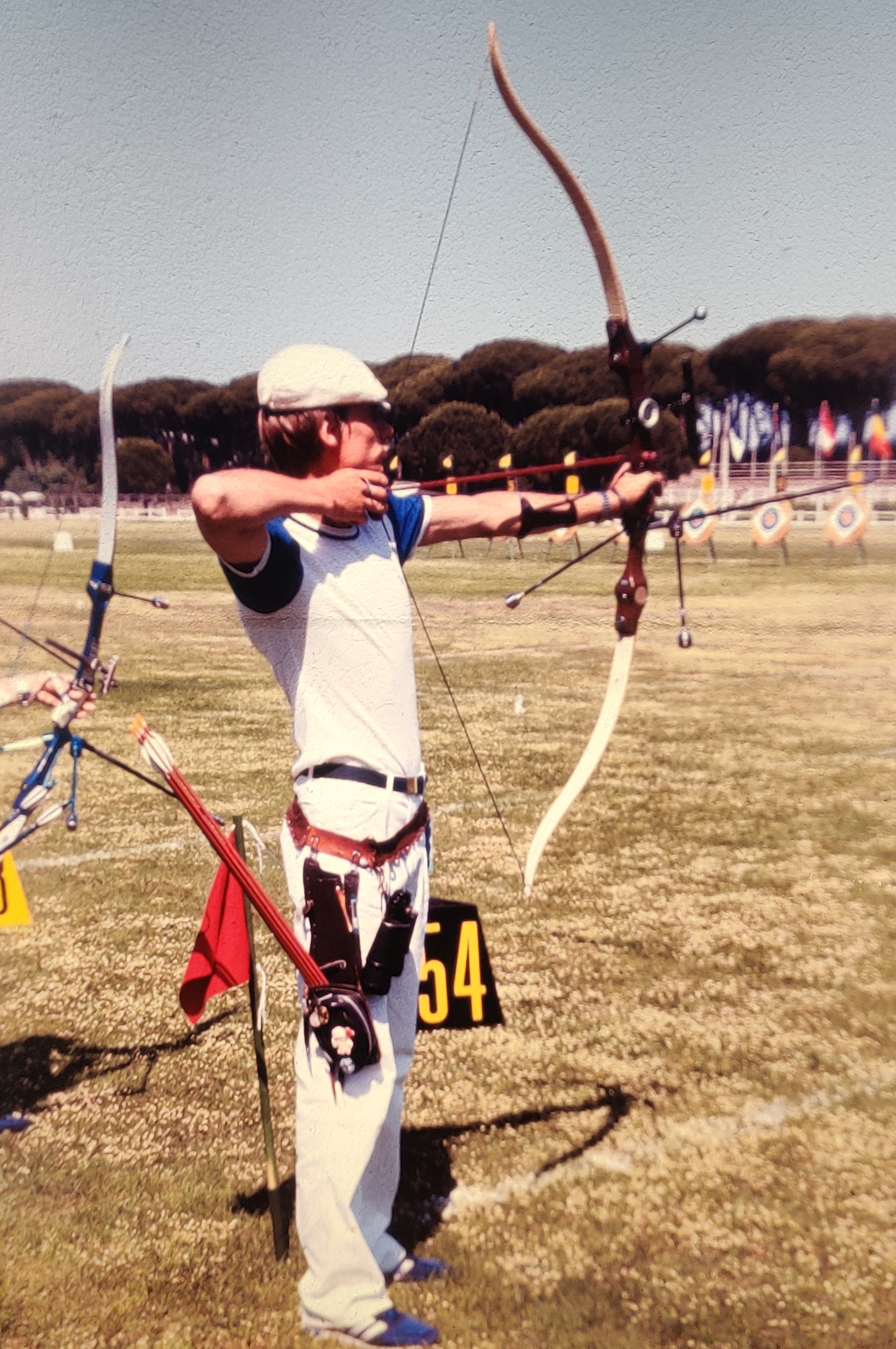
Markku Syrjälä

- Ismo Falck
- Kyösti Laasonen
- Jari Lipponen
- Päivi Meriluoto
- Tomi Poikolainen
- Jorma Sandelin
- Katri Suutari
- Markku Syrjälä
- Tommi Tuovila

== Athletics ==
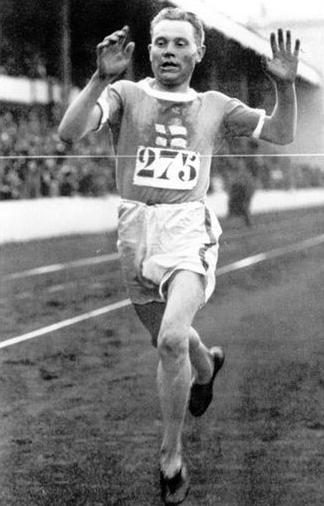
Paavo Nurmi

- Issi Baran
- Arto Bryggare
- Hirsch Drisin
- Arsi Harju
- Arto Härkönen
- Antti Kalliomäki
- Tapio Kantanen
- Elias Katz
- Jorma Kinnunen
- Tapio Korjus
- Tiina Lillak
- Kaarlo Maaninka
- Paavo Nurmi
- Tero Pitkämäki
- Seppo Räty
- Heli Rantanen
- Antti Ruuskanen
- Hannu Siitonen
- Juha Tiainen
- Pekka Vasala
- Lasse Virén

== Auto racing ==
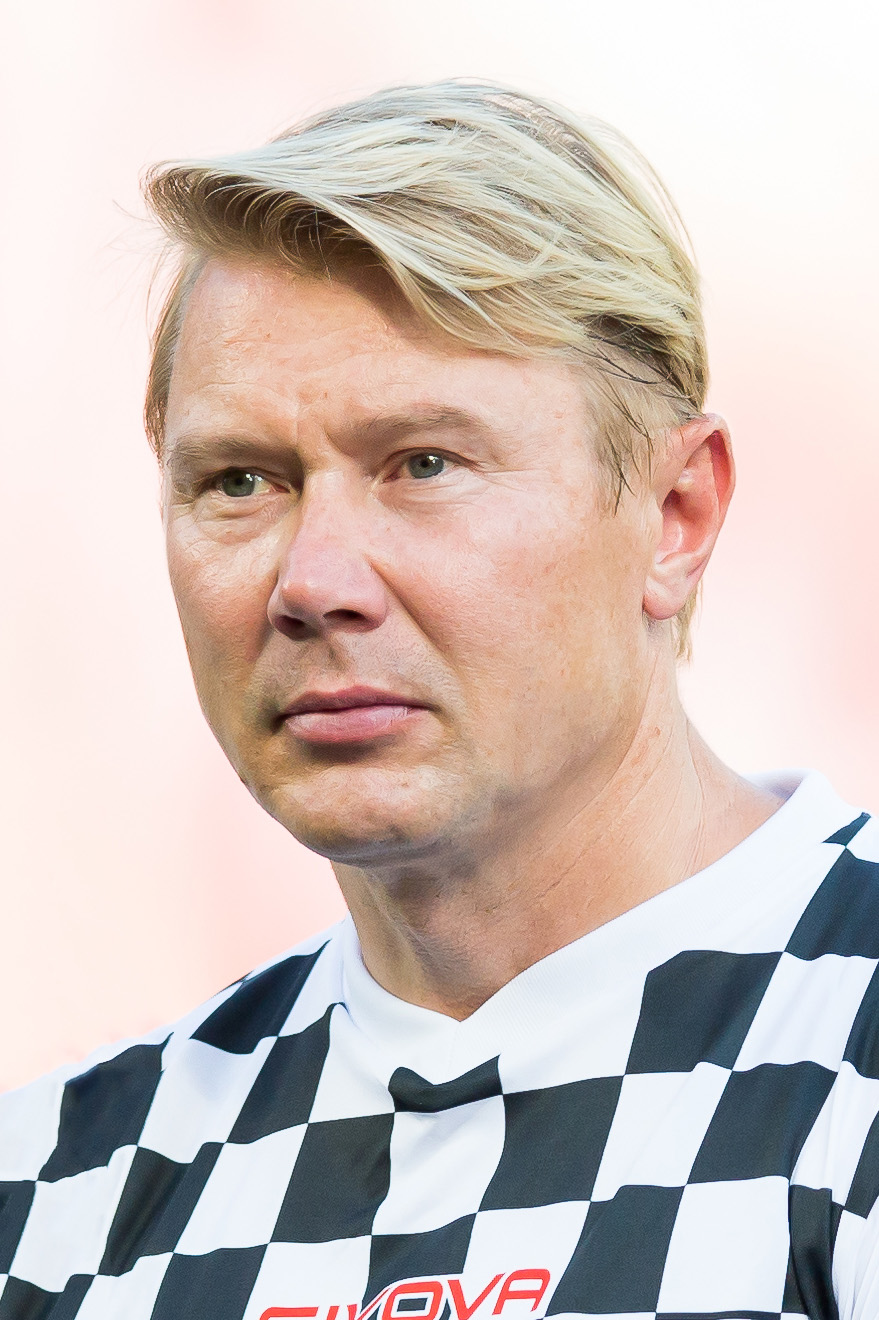
Mika Häkkinen

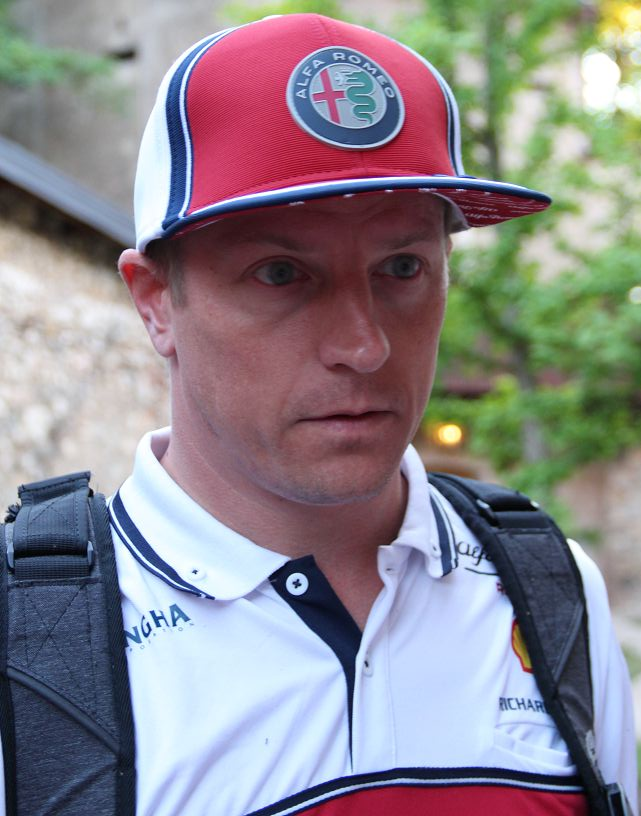
Kimi Räikkönen

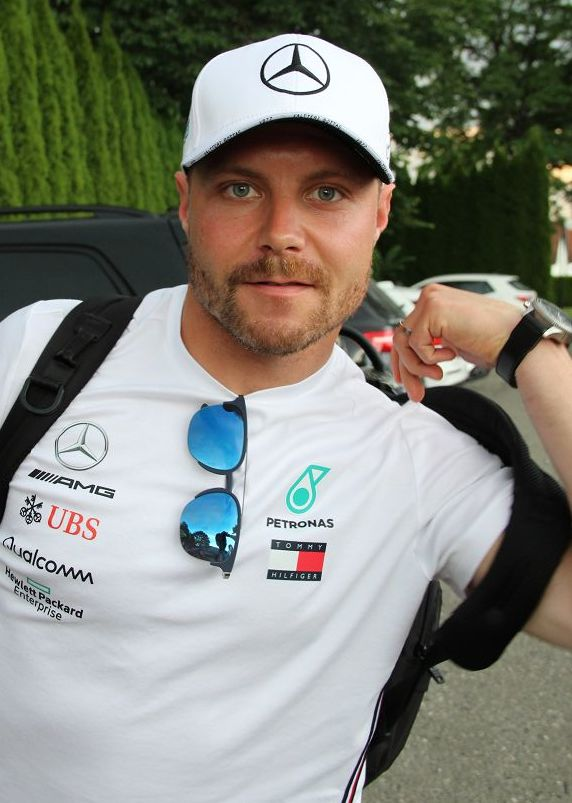
Valtteri Bottas

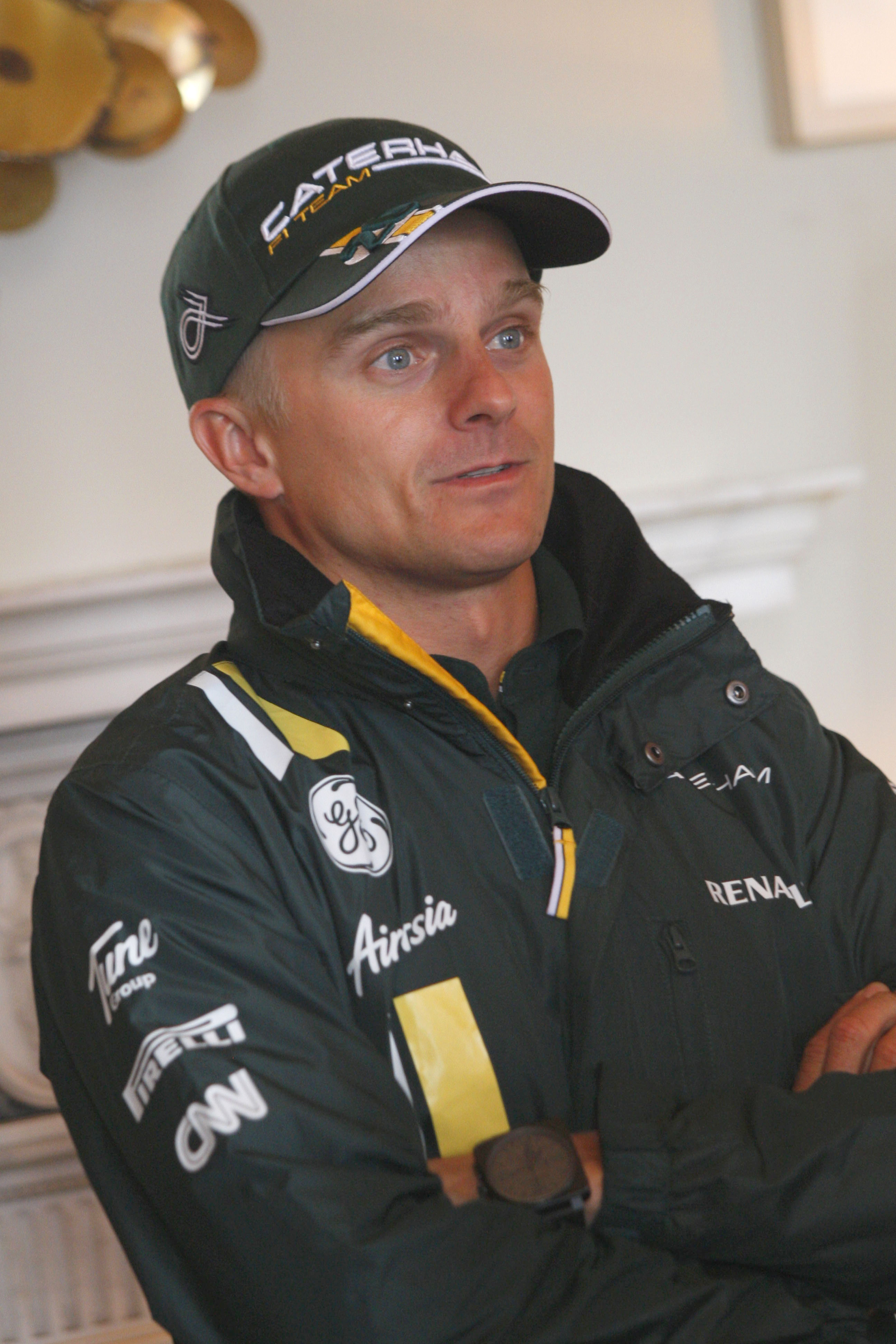
Heikki Kovalainen

- Rauno Aaltonen
- Markku Alén
- Valtteri Bottas
- Antti Buri
- Marcus Grönholm
- Niclas Grönholm
- Mika Häkkinen
- Mikko Hirvonen
- Emma Kimiläinen
- Leo Kinnunen
- Heikki Kovalainen
- Mikko Kozarowitzky
- Jesse Krohn
- Patrick Kujala
- Matias Laine
- Simo Lampinen
- Jari-Matti Latvala
- JJ Lehto
- Mika Mäki
- Timo Mäkinen
- Tommi Mäkinen
- Markus Niemelä
- Hannu Mikkola
- Jari Nurminen
- Markus Palttala
- Rory Penttinen
- Kimi Räikkönen
- Harri Rovanperä
- Kalle Rovanperä
- Keke Rosberg
- Jarno Saarinen
- Mika Salo
- Timo Salonen
- Henri Toivonen
- Ari Vatanen
- Toni Vilander

== Basketball ==
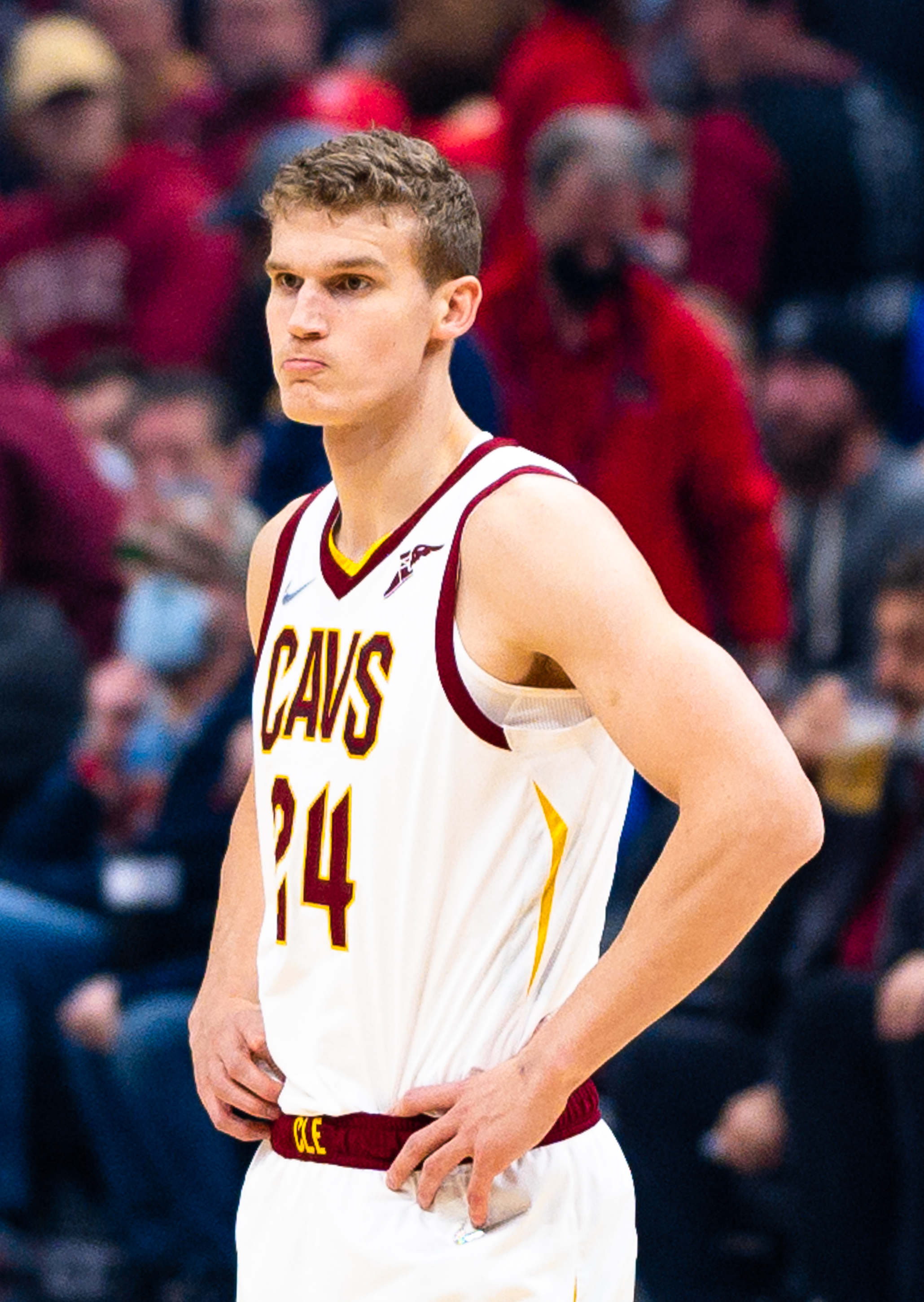
Lauri Markkanen

- Petteri Koponen (born 1988) – basketball player, first Finnish first round pick in NBA draft, now a coach
- Lauri Markkanen (born 1997) – basketball player, currently with the NBA's Utah Jazz
- Hanno Möttölä (born 1976) – basketball player, first Finnish NBA player
- Miron Ruina (born 1998) – Finnish-Israeli basketball player in the Israeli Basketball Premier League

== Beach volleyball ==
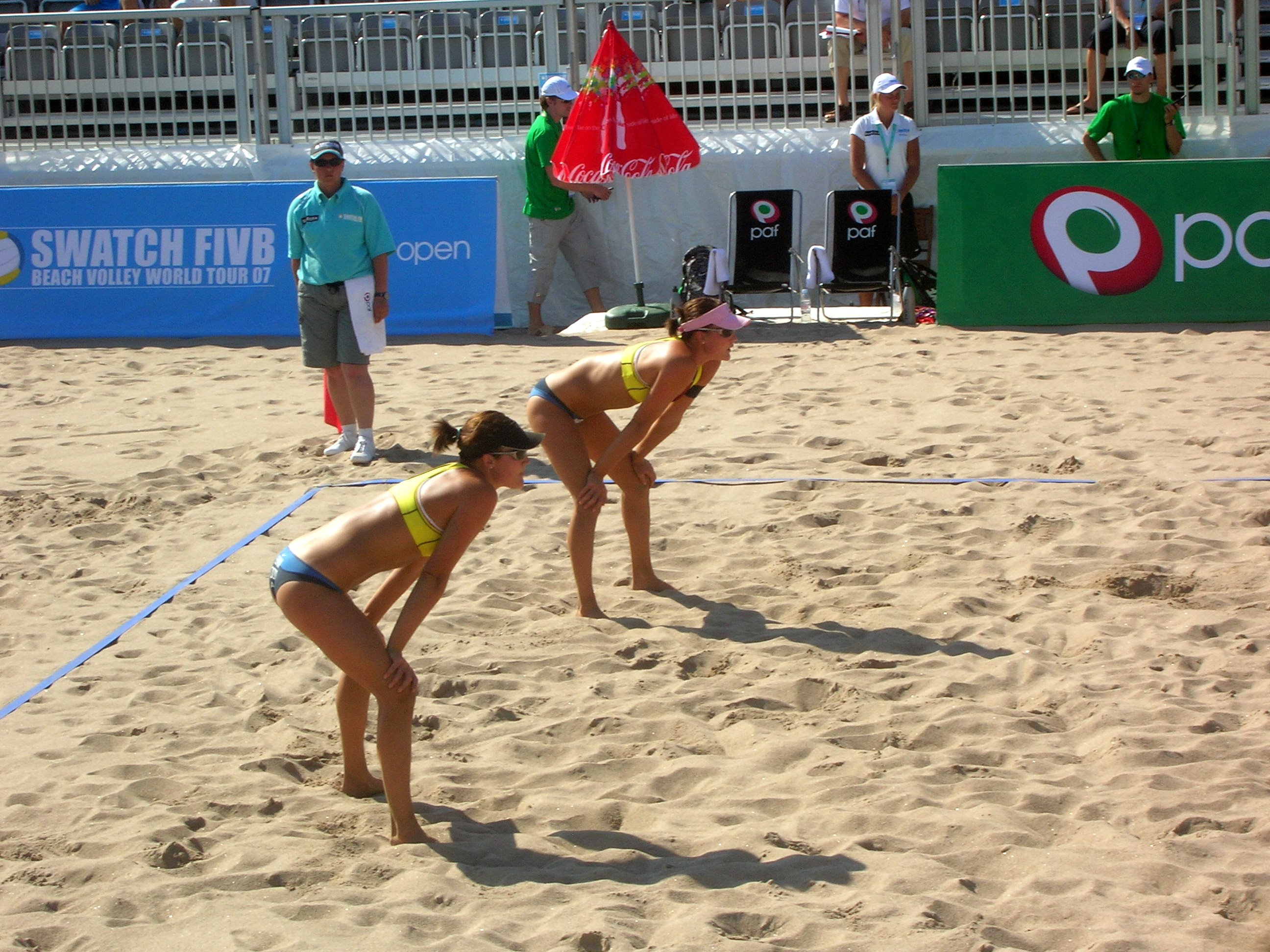
The Nyström twins

- Riikka Lehtonen
- Jyrki Nurminen
- Emilia Nyström
- Erika Nyström

== Biathlon ==
- Väinö Bremer
- Harri Eloranta
- August Eskelinen
- Henrik Flöjt
- Heikki Hirvonen
- Heikki Ikola
- Martti Lappalainen
- Kaisa Mäkäräinen
- Ville Räikkönen
- Mauri Röppänen
- Esko Saira
- Juhani Suutarinen
- Antti Tyrväinen

== Boxing ==
- Bruno Ahlberg
- Lasse Friman
- Jyri Kjäll
- Arto Nilsson
- Joni Nyman
- Reima Virtanen

== Canoeing ==
- Mikko Kolehmainen

== Cross-country skiing ==
- Toimi Alatalo
- Veikko Hakulinen
- Kalevi Hämäläinen
- Heikki Hasu
- Mirja Hietamies
- Väinö Huhtala
- Eija Hyytiäinen
- Jari Isometsä
- Kalle Jalkanen
- Sami Jauhojärvi
- Klaes Karppinen
- Harri Kirvesniemi
- Marja-Liisa Kirvesniemi
- August Kiuru
- Marjatta Kajosmaa
- Aki Karvonen
- Arto Koivisto
- Eero Kolehmainen
- Urpo Korhonen
- Jorma Kortelainen
- Mika Kuusisto
- Anne Kyllönen
- Matti Lähde
- Krista Lähteenmäki
- Teuvo Laukkanen
- Kalevi Laurila
- Mirja Lehtonen
- Väinö Liikkanen
- Paavo Lonkila
- Pirkko Määttä
- Tapio Mäkelä
- Eero Mäntyranta
- Marjo Matikainen-Kallström
- Juha Mieto
- Pirjo Muranen
- Mika Myllylä
- Pekka Niemi
- Tapani Niku
- Iivo Niskanen
- Kerttu Niskanen
- Sulo Nurmela
- Kalevi Oikarainen
- Matti Pitkänen
- Sirkka Polkunen
- Senja Pusula
- Toini Pöysti
- Siiri Rantanen
- Jari Räsänen
- Sami Repo
- Hilkka Riihivuori
- Kari Ristanen
- Marjut Rolig
- Riitta-Liisa Roponen
- Eeva Ruoppa
- Sauli Rytky
- Aino-Kaisa Saarinen
- Veli Saarinen
- Virpi Sarasvuo
- Jaana Savolainen
- Lauri Silvennoinen
- Liisa Suihkonen
- Hannu Taipale
- Helena Takalo
- Pertti Teurajärvi
- Arto Tiainen
- Benjamin Vanninen
- Arvo Viitanen
- Lydia Wideman

== Curling ==
- Kalle Kiiskinen
- Wille Mäkelä
- Teemu Salo
- Jani Sullanmaa
- Markku Uusipaavalniemi

== Fencers ==
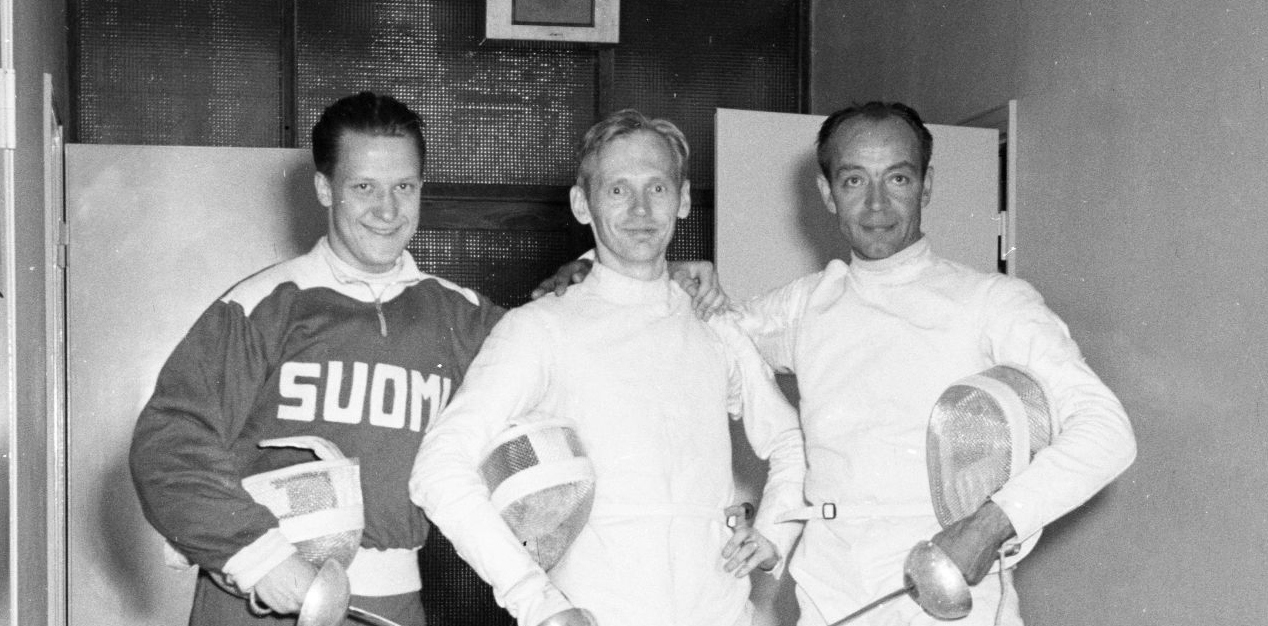
Rolf Wiik, Kauko Jalkanen and Erkki Kerttula in 1952

- Torvald Appelroth
- Kauko Jalkanen
- Erkki Kerttula
- Kurt Lindeman
- Paavo Miettinen
- Kalevi Pakarinen
- Jussi Pelli
- Peder Planting
- Kimmo Puranen
- Heikki Raitio
- Jaakko Vuorinen
- Rolf Wiik

== Figure skating ==
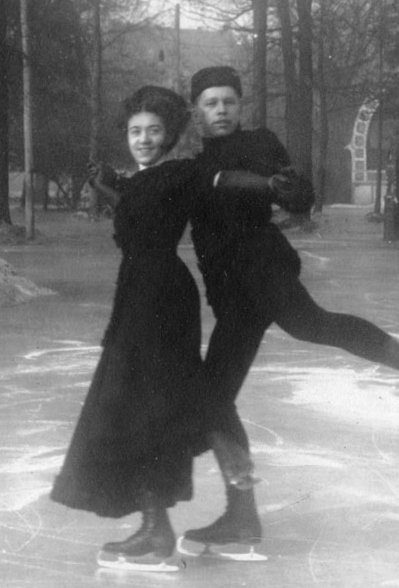
The Jakobssons

- Ludowika Jakobsson
- Walter Jakobsson
- Petri Kokko
- Kiira Korpi
- Laura Lepistö
- Marcus Nikkanen
- Susanna Pöykiö
- Susanna Rahkamo

== Football ==
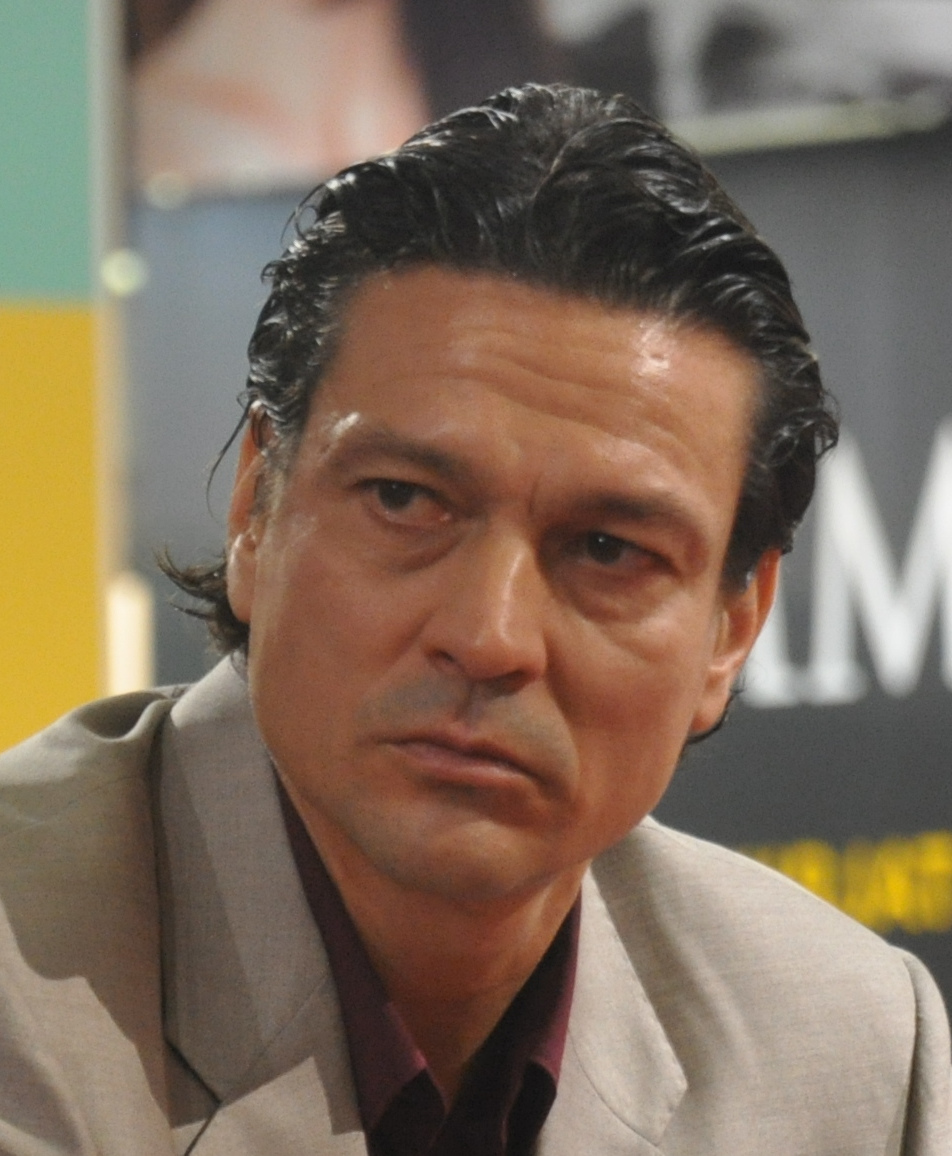
Jari Litmanen

- Abba Gindin
- Janne Hannula
- Markus Heikkinen
- Lukas Hradecky
- Sami Hyypiä
- Glen Kamara
- Jari Litmanen
- Teemu Pukki
- Ilpo Verno

== Freestyle skiing ==
- Janne Lahtela
- Sami Mustonen
- Jouni Pellinen
- Mikko Ronkainen

== Gymnastics ==
- Olli Laiho

== Ice hockey ==
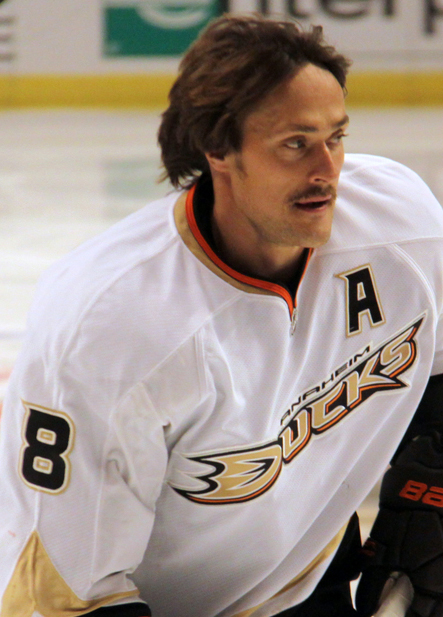
Teemu Selanne

- Peter Ahola
- Justus Annunen
- Sean Bergenheim
- Kari Eloranta
- Markus Granlund
- Mikael Granlund
- Niklas Hagman
- Miro Heiskanen
- Roope Hintz
- Kim Hirschovits
- Aarne Honkavaara
- Jani Hurme
- Arttu Hyry
- Jussi Jokinen
- Olli Jokinen
- Kaapo Kakko
- Kasperi Kapanen
- Sami Kapanen
- Jere Karalahti
- Miikka Kiprusoff
- Nikke Kokko
- Tom Koivisto
- Mikko Koivu
- Saku Koivu
- Lasse Korhonen
- Rasmus Kupari
- Keijo Kuusela
- Artturi Lehkonen
- Kari Lehtonen
- Ville Leino
- Esa Lindell
- Eetu Luostarinen
- Olli Määttä
- Leevi Meriläinen
- Niko Mikkola
- Jarmo Myllys
- Petteri Nummelin
- Janne Öfverström
- Roni Porokara
- Valtteri Puustinen
- Mikko Rantanen
- Aatu Räty
- Antti Rautiola
- Pekka Rinne
- Rasmus Ristolainen
- Sami Salo
- Teemu Selänne
- Jukka Tammi
- Teuvo Teräväinen
- Esa Tikkanen
- Tuukka Rask
- Sami Vatanen

== Modern pentathlon ==
- Risto Hurme
- Berndt Katter
- Martti Ketelä
- Väinö Korhonen
- Olavi Mannonen
- Olavi Rokka
- Veikko Salminen
- Lauri Vilkko

== Nordic combined ==
- Heikki Hasu
- Martti Huhtala
- Jouko Karjalainen
- Antti Kuisma
- Anssi Koivuranta
- Samppa Lajunen
- Hannu Manninen
- Jari Mantila
- Rauno Miettinen
- Tapio Nurmela
- Jaakko Tallus
- Jukka Ylipulli

== Rowing ==
- Pertti Karppinen
- Minna Nieminen
- Sanna Stén

== Sailing ==
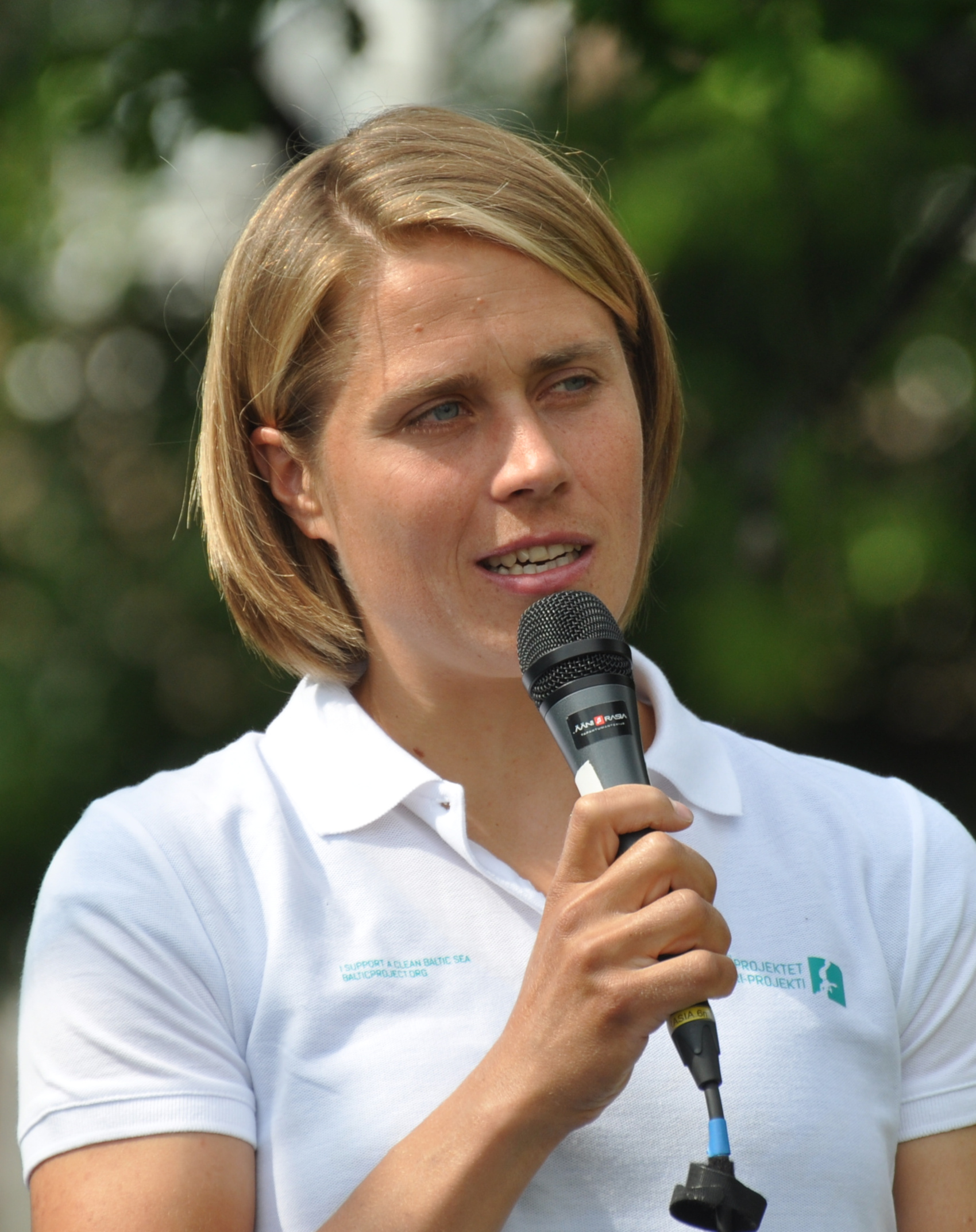
Tuuli Petäjä-Sirén

- Jyrki Järvi
- Thomas Johanson
- Silja Kanerva
- Silja Lehtinen
- Jouko Lindgren
- Tuuli Petäjä-Sirén
- Esko Rechardt
- Georg Tallberg
- Mikaela Wulff

== Shooting ==
- Rauno Bies
- Henri Häkkinen
- Juha Hirvi
- Marko Kemppainen
- Satu Mäkelä-Nummela
- Sampo Voutilainen

== Ski jumping ==
- Janne Ahonen
- Niilo Halonen
- Janne Happonen
- Matti Hautamäki
- Antti Hyvärinen
- Risto Jussilainen
- Aulis Kallakorpi
- Veikko Kankkonen
- Tami Kiuru
- Risto Laakkonen
- Mika Laitinen
- Veli-Matti Lindström
- Toni Nieminen
- Ari-Pekka Nikkola
- Matti Nykänen
- Jari Puikkonen
- Jani Soininen
- Jouko Törmänen
- Tuomo Ylipulli

== Snowboarding ==
- Antti Autti
- Janne Korpi
- Markku Koski
- Markus Malin
- Risto Mattila
- Ville Paumola
- Peetu Piiroinen
- Petja Piiroinen
- Enni Rukajärvi
- Roope Tonteri

== Speed skating ==
- Jaakko Friman
- Eevi Huttunen
- Pentti Lammio
- Kaija Mustonen
- Antero Ojala
- Lassi Parkkinen
- Toivo Salonen
- Julius Skutnabb
- Clas Thunberg
- Birger Wasenius

== Swimming ==
- Arvo Aaltonen
- Antti Kasvio
- Jani Sievinen

== Tennis ==
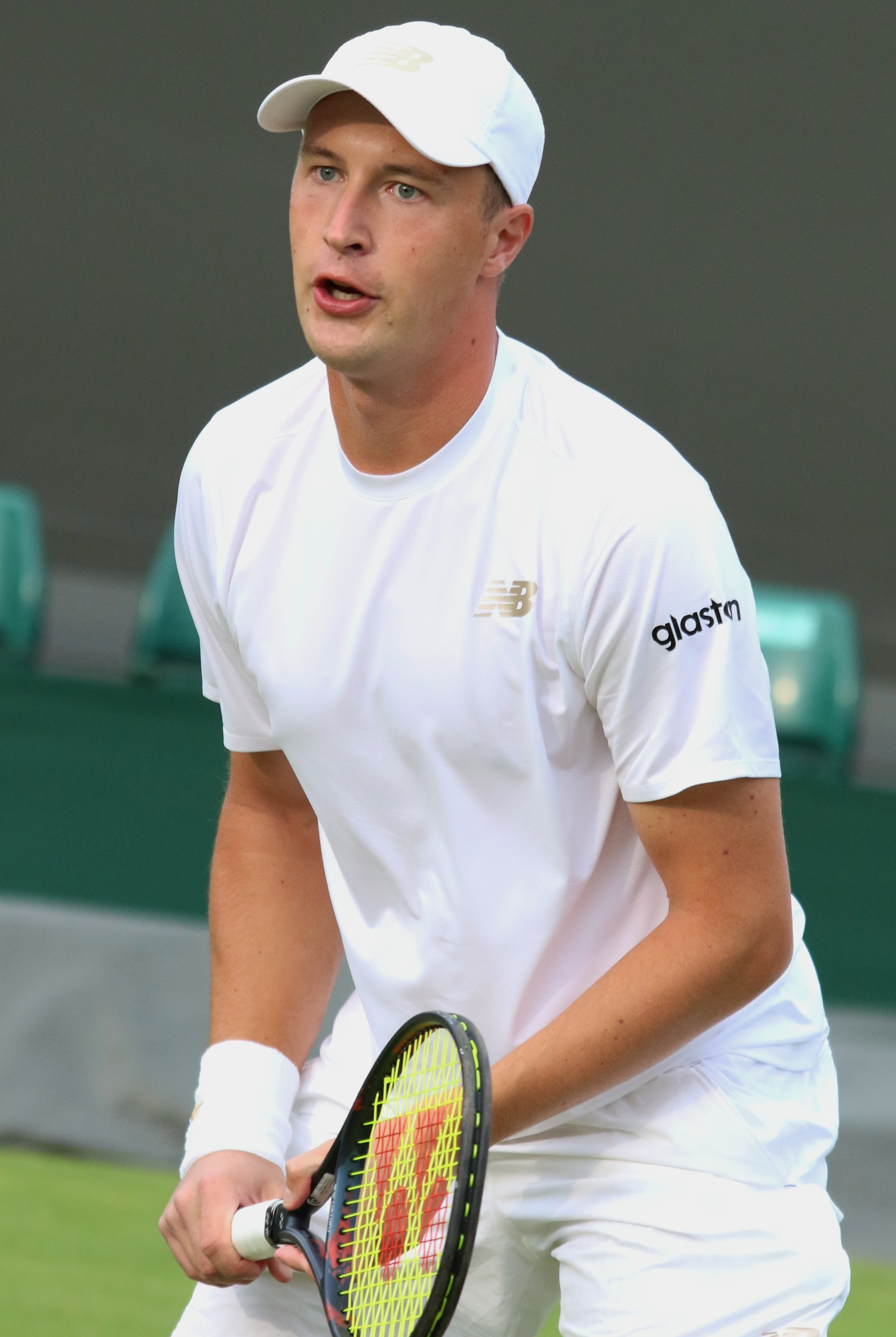
Henri Kontinen

- Jarkko Nieminen
- Henri Kontinen
- Veli Paloheimo

== Weightlifting ==
- Kaarlo Kangasniemi
- Pekka Niemi

== Wrestling ==
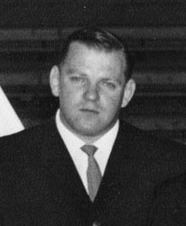
Arje Nadbornik

- Marko Asell
- Risto Björlin
- Marko Yli-Hannuksela
- Mikko Huhtala
- Harri Koskela
- Arje Nadbornik
- Jukka Rauhala
- Jouko Salomäki
- Tapio Sipilä
- Pertti Ukkola

== See also ==
- Sport in Finland
- Finland at the Olympics
- Finland at the Paralympics
- Flying Finn
