= Anatoly Roshchin =

Soviet Greco-Roman wrestler

Personal information
- Born: 10 March 1932 Gaverdovo, Ryazansky District, Moscow Oblast, Russian SFSR, Soviet Union
- Died: 5 January 2016 (aged 83) Saint Petersburg, Russia
- Height: 187 cm (6 ft 2 in)
- Weight: 100–120 kg (220–265 lb)

Sport
- Sport: Greco-Roman wrestling
- Club: Soviet Army, Leningrad
- Coached by: Nikolay Belov
Medal record
Men's Greco-Roman wrestling
Representing the Soviet Union
Olympic Games
| Silver medal – second place | 1964 Tokyo | +97 kg |
| Silver medal – second place | 1968 Mexico City | +97 kg |
| Gold medal – first place | 1972 Munich | +100 kg |
World Championships
| Silver medal – second place | 1962 Toledo | +97 kg |
| Gold medal – first place | 1963 Helsingborg | +97 kg |
| Silver medal – second place | 1967 Bucharest | +97 kg |
| Gold medal – first place | 1969 Mar del Plata | +100 kg |
| Gold medal – first place | 1970 Edmonton | +100 kg |
| Silver medal – second place | 1971 Sofia | +100 kg |
European Championships
| Gold medal – first place | 1966 Essen | +97 kg |

Anatoly Aleksandrovich Roshchin (Russian: Анатолий Александрович Рощин, 10 March 1932 – 5 January 2016) was a heavyweight Greco-Roman wrestler from Russia. Between 1962 and 1972 he won nine medals at the Summer Olympics and world championships, including four gold medals.

Roshchin lost his father during World War II and had to start working as a shepherd aged 10. In 1950, seeking a better job, he moved from his village to Moscow. At the time he trained in weightlifting and basketball and changed to wrestling only in 1954, while serving in the Soviet Navy. His career was interrupted in 1957, when he was diagnosed with a thyroid disorder that required a complex surgery. He recovered by 1960, and in 1961 placed second at the Soviet championships. He also placed second at the 1962 World Championships and 1964 and 1968 Olympics, losing to István Kozma on all occasions, but won the world and Olympic titles in 1963, 1969, 1970 and 1972.

Roshchin needed to wind himself up 10–15 minutes before a bout, and for this purpose would often start a friendly verbal brawl with teammates. By 1972, when he was 40 years old, he was already working as a coach and looking into retirement. He was convinced to compete at the Munich Olympics by the Soviet Sports minister Sergei Pavlov, and won the gold medal. In the last bout he won by default against Wilfried Dietrich, who had a spectacular victory earlier in the tournament and did not want to spoil it by a potential loss. Roshchin retired after the Olympics and later worked as a sports instructor and an international wrestling referee.
