= Wrestling at the 1968 Summer Olympics – Men's Greco-Roman +97 kg =

Wrestling at the Olympics

Men's Greco-Roman +97 kg at the Games of the XIX Olympiad
- Venue: Insurgentes Ice Rink
- Dates: 23–26 October 1968
- Competitors: 15 from 15 nations

Medalists
1st place, gold medalist(s)		István Kozma	Hungary
2nd place, silver medalist(s)		Anatoly Roshchin	Soviet Union
3rd place, bronze medalist(s)		Petr Kment	Czechoslovakia

The Men's Greco-Roman Heavyweight at the 1968 Summer Olympics as part of the wrestling program were held at the Insurgentes Ice Rink. The weight class allowed wrestlers of more than 97 kilograms to compete.

== Results ==
The following wrestlers took part in the event:

Rank	Name	Country
1	István Kozma	Hungary
2	Anatoly Roshchin	Soviet Union
3	Petr Kment	Czechoslovakia
4	Ragnar Svensson	Sweden
5	Constantin Buşoiu	Romania
6	Stefan Petrov	Bulgaria
AC	Raymond Uytterhaeghe	France
AC	Edward Wojda	Poland
AC	Bekir Aksu	Turkey
AC	Bob Roop	United States
AC	Roland Bock	West Germany
AC	Harry Geris	Canada
AC	Arje Nadbornik	Finland
AC	Yorihide Isogai	Japan
AC	Hassan Bechara	Lebanon
