= Zăvoiu =

Zăvoiu may refer to several villages in Romania:

- Zăvoiu, a village in Sâmbăta Commune, Bihor County
- Zăvoiu, a village in Mogoșani Commune, Dâmbovița County
- Zăvoiu, the former name of Zăvoi Commune, Caraș-Severin County
