= Hamit Kaplan =

Circassian wrestler

Medal record

Men's freestyle wrestling

Representing Turkey

Olympic Games
Gold medal – first place	1956 Melbourne	+87 kg
Silver medal – second place	1960 Rome	+87 kg
Bronze medal – third place	1964 Tokyo	+97 kg

World Championships
Gold medal – first place	1957 Istanbul	+87 kg
Silver medal – second place	1961 Yokohama	+87 kg
Silver medal – second place	1959 Tehran	+87 kg
Bronze medal – third place	1963 Sofia	97 kg

World Cup
Gold medal – first place	1956 Istanbul	+87 kg
Bronze medal – third place	1958 Sofia	+87 kg

Mediterranean Games
Gold medal – first place	1959 Beirut	+97 kg

Balkan Championships
Silver medal – second place	1960 Burgas	+87 kg

Olympic medal record

Men's Greco-Roman wrestling

Representing Turkey

World Championships
Silver medal – second place	1961 Yokohama	+87 kg
Bronze medal – third place	1963 Helsingborg	97 kg
Bronze medal – third place	1958 Budapest	+87 kg
Bronze medal – third place	1955 Karlsruhe	+87 kg

World Cup
Silver medal – second place	1956 Istanbul	+87 kg

Mediterranean Games
Gold medal – first place	1955 Barcelona	+97 kg

Balkan Championships
Silver medal – second place	1965 Yambol	+97 kg

Hamit Kaplan (20 September 1934 – 5 January 1976) was a Turkish World and Olympic champion sports wrestler of Circassian descent in the Heavyweight class. He won the gold, silver and bronze medal in men's freestyle wrestling at three consecutive Olympic Games in 1956, 1960 and 1964.

Born in Hamamözü town in Amasya Province, he began wrestling as a youngster in the traditional Turkish sport Yağlı güreş (oil wrestling). Soon, he switched over to sports wrestling and became juniors champion in the Heavyweight class. Hamit Kaplan was admitted to the national team in 1954 and was trained by the renowned wrestler Celal Atik for his skill. Already at his age of 22, he represented Turkey at the World Championships held in Karlsruhe, Germany and ranked 3rd in the Greco-Roman style.

Besides three Olympic medals, he won many more titles at international competitions both in freestyle and Greco-Roman category. Hamit Kaplan, weighing 100 kg at his 1.90 m height, was a defensive wrestler, who finished much of his matches in draw.

Hamit Kaplan resigned after the 1964 Olympics, because he was no more match for his strong opponents like Hungarian István Kozma, Soviet Russians Aleksandr Ivanitsky and Aleksandr Medved. He was 175 times international for his country.

He died on 5 January 1976 at the age of 41 following a traffic accident in Çorum, and was buried in his home town, Hamamözü. A sports hall with 1,000 seats in Amasya and another small one in Hamamözü are named after him.

== Achievements ==
- 1955 Mediterranean Games in Barcelona, Spain - gold (Greco-Roman Heavyweight)
- 1955 World Wrestling Championships in Karlsruhe, Germany - bronze (Greco-Roman Heavyweight)
- 1956 World Cup in Istanbul, Turkey - silver (Freestyle Heavyweight), gold (Greco-Roman Heavyweight)
- 1956 Summer Olympics in Melbourne, Australia - gold (Freestyle Heavyweight), 4th (Greco-Roman Heavyweight)
- 1957 World Championships in Istanbul, Turkey - gold (Freestyle Heavyweight)
- 1958 World Cup in Sofia, Bulgaria - bronze (Freestyle Heavyweight)
- 1958 World Championships in Budapest, Hungary - bronze (Greco-Roman Heavyweight)
- 1959 Mediterranean Games in Beirut, Lebanon - gold (Freestyle Heavyweight)
- 1959 World Championships in Tehran, Iran - silver (Freestyle Heavyweight)
- 1960 Balkan Championships in Burgas, Bulgaria - silver (Freestyle Heavyweight)
- 1960 Summer Olympics in Rome, Italy - silver (Freestyle Heavyweight)
- 1961 World Championships in Yokohama, Japan - silver (Freestyle Heavyweight), silver (Greco-Roman Heavyweight)
- 1962 World Championships in Toledo, Ohio, United States - 4th (Freestyle Heavyweight), 4th (Greco-Roman Heavyweight)
- 1963 Mediterranean Games in Naples, Italy - gold (Freestyle Heavyweight)
- 1963 World Championships in Sofia, Bulgaria - bronze (Freestyle Heavyweight)
- 1963 World Championships in Helsingborg, Denmark - bronze (Greco-Roman Heavyweight)
- 1964 Summer Olympics in Tokyo, Japan - bronze (Freestyle Heavyweight), 10th (Greco-Roman Heavyweight)
- 1965 Balkan Championships in Yambol, Bulgaria - silver (Greco-Roman Heavyweight)
