= Ahven =

Ahven may refer to:

- Ahven-class minesweeper, a ship class of the Finnish Navy
- Mati Ahven (born 1943), Estonian engineer and mechanic
- Viktor Ahven (1929–2013), Finnish wrestler
