= Hercules vs. Moloch =

- Directed by: Giorgio Ferroni
- Screenplay by: Remigio Del Grosso; Arrigo Equini; Giorgio Ferroni
- Produced by: Diego Alchimede; Roberto de Nesle
- Starring: Gordon Scott; Alessandra Panaro; Rosalba Neri; Arturo Dominici; Michel Lemoine; Jany Clair; Nerio Bernardi; Giovanni Pazzafini; Geneviève Grad; Pietro Marascalchi
- Cinematography: Augusto Tiezzi
- Edited by: Antonietta Zita
- Production companies: Explorer Film '58; Comptoir Francais du Film
- Distributed by: Variety Distribution
- Release date: 21 December 1963 (Italy)
- Running time: 98 minutes
- Countries: Italy; France

Hercules vs. Moloch (Italian: Ercole contro Moloch, French: Hercule contre Moloch, also released as Conquest of Mycenae) is a 1963 Italian/French international co-production peplum film written and directed by Giorgio Ferroni and starring Gordon Scott. The film reuses battle scenes from Ferroni's 1961 film The Trojan Horse.

== Plot ==
The city-state of Mycenae is able to dominate the rest of the nearby city-states due to its impregnable fortress. Led by a facially deformed King who believes himself Moloch incarnated, the madman demands slaves as tribute, where he tortures and kills a selected few. Prince Glaucus from Tiryns has an idea to seize and destroy Mycenae from within. Using the name of Hercules, he poses as one of the slaves given to Mycenae in tribute.

He becomes a gladiator, but he secretly plots to lead a revolution and destroy the creature that has enslaved the people.

== Cast ==
- Gordon Scott as Prince Glaucus a.k.a. Hercules
- Alessandra Panaro as Medea, Princess of Mycenae
- Rosalba Neri as Demetra, Queen of Mycenae
- Arturo Dominici as Penthius, General of Mycenae
- Michel Lemoine as Euneos
- Jany Clair as Deianira
- Nerio Bernardi as Asterion, the High Priest
- Giovanni Pazzafini as Archepolos
- Geneviève Grad as Pasifaë
- Pietro Marascalchi as Moloch

== Release ==
Hercules vs. Moloch was released in Italy on December 21, 1963. It was released in the United States by December 15, 1965.

== Reception ==
From contemporary reviews, the Monthly Film Bulletin reviewed a 91 minute dubbed version. The film stated that the plot was "completely routine" and its ending was "over-extravagant", the "Herculean hero is at least credited with a distinct measure of intelligence" noting that "the question of sheer physical strength is related ambigulously [...] There is no penny-pinching in the staging; hundreds of extras are used for the big battle scenes, which really do succeed in giving the effect of an army and not merely a platoon."

== See also ==
- List of films featuring Hercules
- Moloch
