= Mogoșești (disambiguation) =

Mogoșești may refer to several places in Romania:

- Mogoșești, a commune in Iași County
- Mogoșești-Siret, a commune in Iași County
- Mogoșești, a village in Vedea Commune, Argeș County
- Mogoșești, a village in Dragomirești Commune, Dâmbovița County
- Mogoșești, a village in Goiești Commune, Dolj County
- Mogoșești, a village in Adunații-Copăceni Commune, Giurgiu County
- Mogoșești, a village in Satulung Commune, Maramureș County
- Mogoșești, a village administered by Scornicești town, Olt County
- Mogoșești, a village in Stoenești Commune, Vâlcea County
- Mogoșești, the Romanian name of Bairaky, Ukraine

== See also ==
- Mogoș
- Mogoșani
- Mogoșoaia (disambiguation)
