= Mogoșoaia (disambiguation) =

Mogoșoaia is a commune in Muntenia, Romania.

Mogoșoaia may also refer to:

- Sinking of the Mogoșoaia, 1989 ferry disaster
- Mogoșoaia River, a tributary of the Doftana River in Romania
- Mogoşoaia Stadium, a football stadium in Romania which is part of the National Football Centre
- Mogoșoaia Palace, situated about 10 kilometres from Bucharest, Romania

== See also ==
- Mogoș
- Mogoșani
- Mogoșești (disambiguation)
