= Kanji Shigeoka =

Japanese wrestler

Personal information
- Nationality: Japanese
- Born: 6 November 1934 (age 91) Fukuoka, Japan

Sport
- Sport: Wrestling

Kanji Shigeoka (重岡 完治, Shigeoka Kanji; born 6 November 1934) is a Japanese wrestler. He competed in the men's Greco-Roman heavyweight at the 1960 Summer Olympics.
