= Kaoru Ishiguro =

Japanese wrestler

Personal information
- Nationality: Japanese
- Born: 6 May 1933 (age 93) Hokkaido, Japan

Sport
- Sport: Wrestling

Kaoru Ishiguro (born 6 May 1933) is a Japanese wrestler. He competed in the men's freestyle heavyweight at the 1960 Summer Olympics.
