= Victor Dolipschi =

Romanian Greco-Roman wrestler

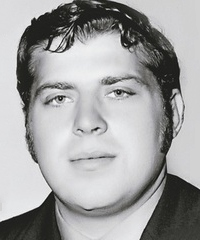

Personal information
- Born: 19 October 1950 Bucharest, Romania
- Died: 19 January 2009 (aged 58) Bucharest, Romania
- Height: 186 cm (6 ft 1 in)
- Weight: 150 kg (331 lb)

Sport
- Sport: Greco-Roman wrestling
- Club: CS Dinamo București
Medal record
Representing Romania
Olympic Games
Bronze medal – third place	1972 Munich	+100 kg
Bronze medal – third place	1984 Los Angeles	+100 kg
European Championships
Bronze medal – third place	1972 Katowice	+100 kg
Bronze medal – third place	1977 Bursa	+100 kg
Summer Universiade
Gold medal – first place	1981 Bucharest	+100 kg
Bronze medal – third place	1973 Moscow	+100 kg

Victor Dolipschi (19 October 1950 – 19 January 2009) was a heavyweight Greco-Roman wrestler from Romania. He won bronze medals at the 1972 and 1984 Olympics and 1972 and 1977 European championships. After retiring from competitions he joined the Romanian Wrestling Federation and eventually became its president.
