= Ištvan Semeredi =

Yugoslav wrestler (born 1948)

Personal information
- Nationality: Yugoslav
- Born: 8 April 1948 (age 78)

Sport
- Sport: Wrestling

Ištvan Semeredi (born 8 April 1948) is a Yugoslav wrestler. He competed in the men's Greco-Roman +100 kg at the 1972 Summer Olympics.
