= Bekir Aksu =

Turkish wrestler

Personal information
- Nationality: Turkish
- Born: 1938 (age 87–88) Yozgat, Turkey

Sport
- Sport: Wrestling

Bekir Aksu (born 1938) is a Turkish wrestler. He competed in the men's Greco-Roman +97 kg at the 1968 Summer Olympics.
