= Muhammad Nazir (wrestler, born 1930) =

Pakistani wrestler (born 1930)

Personal information
- Nationality: Pakistani
- Born: 20 August 1930 Lahore, Pakistan

Sport
- Sport: Wrestling
Medal record
Asian Games
Silver medal – second place	1958 Tokyo	+87 kg

Muhammad Nazir (born 20 August 1930) is a Pakistani former wrestler. He competed in the men's freestyle heavyweight at the 1960 Summer Olympics.
