= Max Widmer =

Swiss wrestler (1933–2010)

Personal information
- Nationality: Swiss
- Born: 17 November 1933 Oftringen, Switzerland
- Died: 17 June 2010 (aged 76) Walterswil, Solothurn, Switzerland

Sport
- Sport: Wrestling

Max Widmer (17 November 1933 – 17 June 2010) was a Swiss wrestler. He competed in the men's freestyle heavyweight at the 1960 Summer Olympics. Widmer died in Walterswil, Solothurn on 17 June 2010, at the age of 76.
