= Tserendonoin Sanjaa =

Mongolian wrestler (1936–2019)

Personal information
- Nationality: Mongolian
- Born: 7 November 1936
- Died: 22 April 2019 (aged 82)

Sport
- Sport: Wrestling

Tserendonoin Sanjaa (7 November 1936 – 22 April 2019) was a Mongolian wrestler. He competed in the men's freestyle heavyweight at the 1964 Summer Olympics.
