= Ivan Bohdan =

Soviet and Ukrainian wrestler (1928–2020)

Personal information
- Born: 29 February 1928 Dmytro-Bilivka, Kryvyi Rih Okruha, Ukrainian SSR, Soviet Union
- Died: 25 December 2020 (aged 92)

Sport
- Sport: Wrestling
Medal record
Men's Greco-Roman wrestling
Representing the Soviet Union
Olympic Games
Gold medal – first place	1960 Rome	Heavyweight
World Championships
Gold medal – first place	1958 Budapest	Heavyweight
Gold medal – first place	1961 Yokohama	Heavyweight

Ivan Havrylovych Bohdan (Ukrainian: Іван Гаврилович Богдан; 29 February 1928 – 25 December 2020) was a Soviet and Ukrainian wrestler. He was born in Dmytro-Bilivka, Kryvyi Rih Okruha, Ukrainian SSR (today in Mykolaiv Oblast, not far from Kryvyi Rih).

He won an Olympic gold medal in Greco-Roman wrestling in 1960, competing for the Soviet Union. He won gold medals at the 1958 and 1961 World Wrestling Championships.
