= Roland Bock =

German wrestler (1944–2025)

Personal information
- Nationality: German
- Born: 3 August 1944 Geislingen an der Steige, Gau Württemberg-Hohenzollern, Germany
- Died: 19 December 2025 (aged 81)
- Height: 6 ft 5 in (1.96 m)
- Weight: 273 lb (124 kg)

Sport
- Sport: Wrestling

Roland Bock (3 August 1944 – 19 December 2025) was a German wrestler. He represented West Germany in the men's Greco-Roman +97 kg at the 1968 Summer Olympics.

Bock died on 19 December 2025 at the age of 81.
