= Max Ordman =

South African wrestler (1926–2002)

Personal information
- Nationality: South African
- Born: 17 June 1926 Germiston, Gauteng, South Africa
- Died: 12 January 2002 (aged 75) Sydenham, Gauteng, South Africa

Sport
- Sport: Wrestling

Max Ordman (17 June 1926 – 12 January 2002) was a South African wrestler. He competed in the men's freestyle heavyweight at the 1960 Summer Olympics.

Ordman won the light heavyweight wrestling gold medal at the 1950 Maccabiah Games in Israel.
