= Stefan Petrov =

Bulgarian wrestler

Personal information
- Nationality: Bulgarian
- Born: 19 May 1936 (age 90) Stara Zagora, Bulgaria

Sport
- Sport: Wrestling

Stefan Petrov (born 19 May 1936) is a Bulgarian wrestler. He competed in the men's Greco-Roman +97 kg at the 1968 Summer Olympics.
