= Savkuz Dzarasov =

Russian wrestler (1930–1990)

Personal information
- Born: 5 January 1930 Pravoberezhny District, North Ossetian Autonomous Oblast, Russian SFSR, Soviet Union
- Died: 12 July 1990 (aged 60)
- Height: 182 cm (6 ft 0 in)
- Weight: 108 kg (238 lb)

Sport
- Sport: Freestyle wrestling
- Club: Spartak Ordzonikidze
Medal record
Representing the Soviet Union
Olympic Games
Bronze medal – third place	1960 Rome	+87 kg
World Championships
Bronze medal – third place	1959 Tehran	+87 kg

Savkuz Dzaboyevich Dzarasov (Russian: Савкуз Дзабоевич Дзарасов; 5 January 1930 – 12 July 1990) was a Russian heavyweight freestyle wrestler who won bronze medals at the 1959 World Championships and 1960 Olympics. Domestically he won the Soviet title in 1958 and 1959, placing second in 1952 and 1961 and third in 1960.

In 1950 Dzarasov graduated from the North Ossetian State University, and in his late years worked as a sports official. He was of ethnic Ossetian descent.
