= Constantin Bușoiu =

Romanian wrestler (1941–2022)

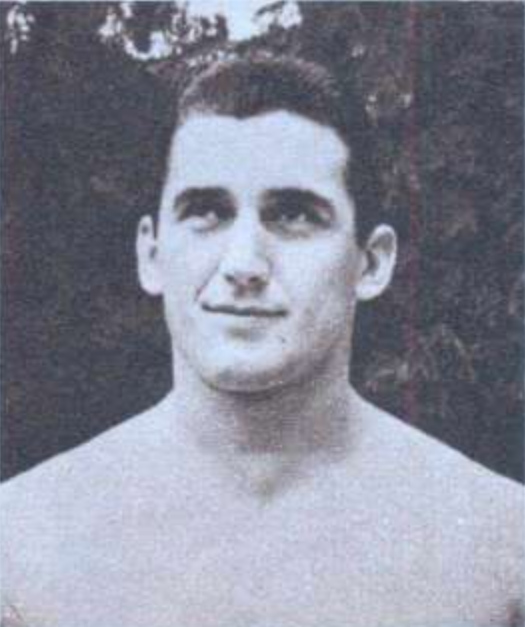
- Bușoi in 1968

Personal information
- Nationality: Romanian
- Born: 3 June 1941 Mogoșani, Romania
- Died: August 2022 (aged 81)

Sport
- Sport: Wrestling

Constantin Bușoiu (3 June 1941 – August 2022) was a Romanian wrestler. He competed in the men's Greco-Roman +97 kg at the 1968 Summer Olympics.
