= Bohumil Kubát =

Medal record

Men's Greco-Roman wrestling

Representing Czechoslovakia

Olympic Games
Bronze medal – third place	1960 Rome	Heavyweight

Bohumil Kubát (14 February 1935, Česká Třebová – 12 May 2016, Chomutov) was a Czech wrestler. He competed for Czechoslovakia and won an Olympic bronze medal in Greco-Roman wrestling in 1960. He competed at the 1964 Olympics, where he placed fourth in Freestyle wrestling.
