= Arne Robertsson =

Swedish wrestler (1942–1991)

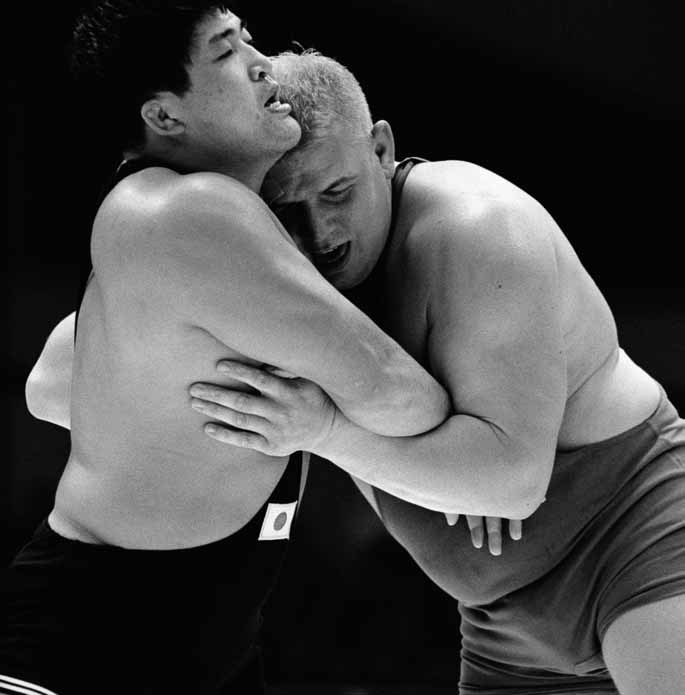
- Robertsson (right) vs. Masa Saito at the 1964 Olympics

Personal information
- Born: 23 March 1942 Lidköping, Sweden
- Died: 29 January 1991 (aged 48) Lidköping, Sweden
- Height: 179 cm (5 ft 10 in)
- Weight: 120 kg (265 lb)

Sport
- Sport: Wrestling
- Club: Lidköpings AS
Medal record
Representing Sweden
World championships
Bronze medal – third place	1977 Lausanne	Greco-Roman +100 kg
European championships
Silver medal – second place	1966 Karlsruhe	Freestyle, +97 kg
Silver medal – second place	1969 Modena	Greco-Roman, +100 kg

Arne Alf Robert Robertsson (23 March 1942 – 29 January 1991) was a Swedish heavyweight wrestler who won a bronze medal in Greco-Roman wrestling at the 1977 World Championships. He competed at the 1964 and 1968 Olympics in freestyle and at the 1976 Games in Greco-Roman wrestling, but was eliminated after two rounds on all occasions. At the European championships Robertsson won a silver medal in Greco-Roman and freestyle wrestling each.
