= Antti Rautiola =

Finnish ice hockey player

- Born: 8 February 1988 (age 37); Äänekoski, Finland
- Height: 6 ft 1 in (185 cm)
- Weight: 179 lb (81 kg; 12 st 11 lb)
- Position: Goaltender
- Catches: Right
- SM-liiga team Former teams: Pelicans: Kärpät
- Playing career: 2007–present

Antti Rautiola (born 8 February 1988) is a Finnish professional ice hockey goaltender who plays for Pelicans of the SM-liiga. He is currently on loan at Peliitat. He also used to play for Kärpät.
