= Pietro Marascalchi =

Italian wrestler (1931–2019)

Personal information
- Nationality: Italian
- Born: 1 August 1931 Mestre, Italy
- Died: 16 April 2019 (aged 87)

Sport
- Sport: Wrestling

Pietro Marascalchi (1 August 1931 – 16 April 2019) was an Italian wrestler. He competed in the men's freestyle heavyweight at the 1960 Summer Olympics.
