= Arje Nadbornik =

Finnish wrestler (1935–2008)

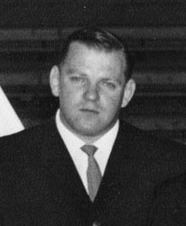
- Arto Savolainen in 1965.

Personal information
- Nationality: Finnish
- Born: 7 October 1935 Helsinki, Finland
- Died: 5 July 2008 (aged 72) Helsinki, Finland

Sport
- Sport: Wrestling

Arje Nadbornik (7 October 1935 – 5 July 2008) was a Finnish wrestler. He competed in the men's Greco-Roman +97 kg at the 1968 Summer Olympics. Nadbornik was Jewish, and he represented the Finnish Jewish sports club Makkabi Helsinki.
