= Yaghoub Ali Shourvarzi =

Iranian wrestler

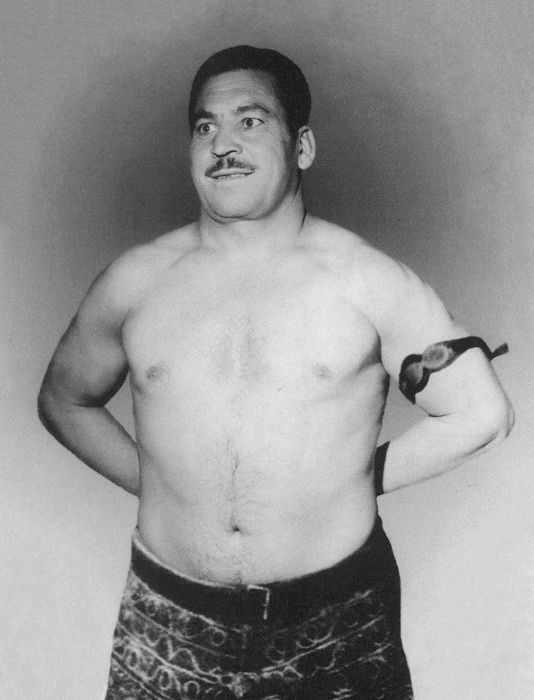

Personal information
- Born: 4 May 1924 Neishabour, Iran
- Died: 1999 (aged 74–75) Neishabour, Iran
- Height: 192 cm (6 ft 4 in)
- Weight: 112 kg (247 lb)

Sport
- Sport: Freestyle wrestling

Yaghoub Ali Shourvarzi (Persian: یعقوبعلی شورورزی, 4 May 1924 – 1999) was an Iranian heavyweight freestyle wrestler. He placed sixth at the 1959 World Wrestling Championships and tenth at the 1960 Summer Olympics.
