= Lyutvi Ahmedov =

Bulgarian wrestler (1930–1997)

Olympic medal record

Men's freestyle wrestling

Representing Bulgaria

Olympic Games
Silver medal – second place	1964 Tokyo	Heavyweight

World Championships
Gold medal – first place	1959 Tehran	+87 kg
Silver medal – second place	1962 Toledo	97 kg
Silver medal – second place	1963 Sofia	97 kg
Silver medal – second place	1965 Manchester	97 kg

World Cup
Gold medal – first place	1958 Sofia	Heavyweight

Lyutvi Ahmedov (10 April 1930 – 1997) was a Bulgarian wrestler who competed in the 1960 Summer Olympics and in the 1964 Summer Olympics.
