= Raimo Karlsson =

Finnish wrestler

Raimo Johan Hilding Karlsson (18 February 1948 in Helsinki – 27 February 2007 in Phuket) was a Finnish wrestler who competed in the 1972 Summer Olympics.
