= Bob Pickens =

American gridiron football player (1943–2018)

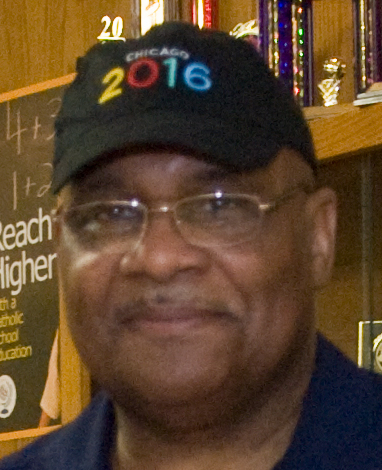
- Pickens in 2008

No. 70, 67
- Position: Offensive tackle

Personal information
- Born: February 2, 1943; Chicago, Illinois, U.S.
- Died: April 12, 2018 (aged 75); Sandy Springs, Georgia, U.S.
- Listed height: 6 ft 4 in (1.93 m)
- Listed weight: 258 lb (117 kg)

Career information
- High school: Evanston Township (Evanston, Illinois)
- College: Wisconsin (1962-1963); Nebraska (1965-1966)
- NFL draft: 1966: 3rd round, 44th overall pick
- AFL draft: 1966: Red Shirt 2nd round, 15th overall pick

Career history
- Chicago Bears (1967–1969); Edmonton Eskimos (1969–1970)

Awards and highlights
- Second-team All-Big Eight (1966)

Career NFL statistics
- Games played: 20
- Games started: 5
- Stats at Pro Football Reference

Bob Pickens (February 2, 1943 – April 12, 2018) was a player in the National Football League (NFL). He was drafted in the third round of the 1966 NFL draft by the Chicago Bears and played three seasons with the team.

Pickens was also an Olympic Greco-Roman wrestler, competing in Tokyo, Japan, in the heavyweight division at the 1964 Summer Olympics, where he finished sixth. Pickens was the first African-American to compete for the United States in wrestling at the Olympics. He played collegiate football at Nebraska, transferring there after originally attending Wisconsin. Pickens did not wrestle for either university, although he still continued his wrestling at various club organizations. After his pro football career, Pickens became a referee, officiating in the Big Ten Conference and a number of postseason games, including the Rose Bowl. He also served on the Chicago Park District Board for several years.
