= Markku Syrjälä =

Finnish archer (1955–2023)

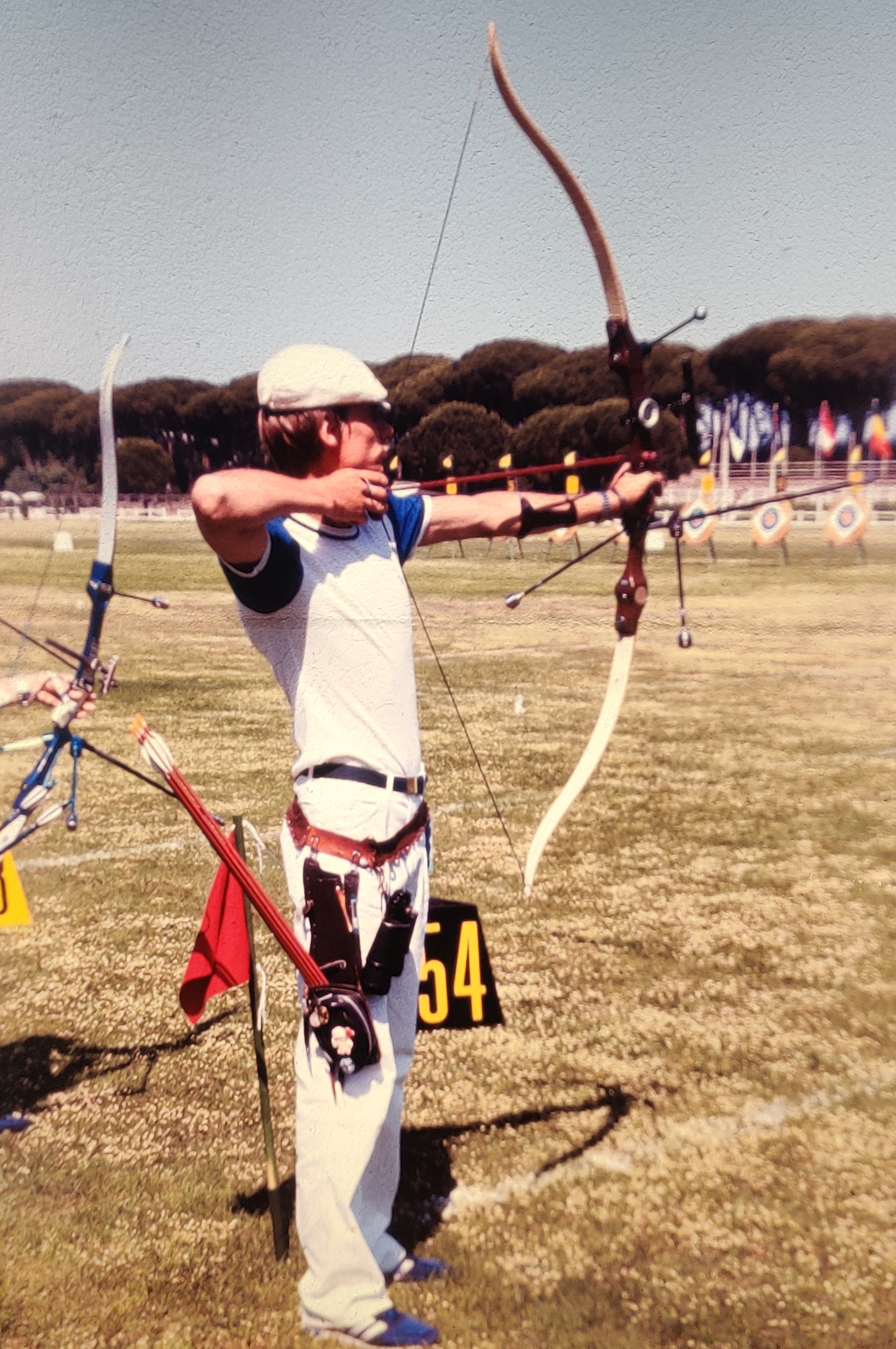
- Syrjälä in Italy in 1981

Personal information
- Nationality: Finnish
- Born: 12 May 1955; Kurikka, Finland
- Died: 11 October 2023 (aged 68)

Sport
- Sport: Archery

Markku Syrjälä (12 May 1955 – 11 October 2023) was a Finnish archer. He competed in the men's individual event at the 1984 Summer Olympics. Syrjälä died on 11 October 2023, at the age of 68.
