= Tan Tarı =

Turkish wrestler (born 1935)

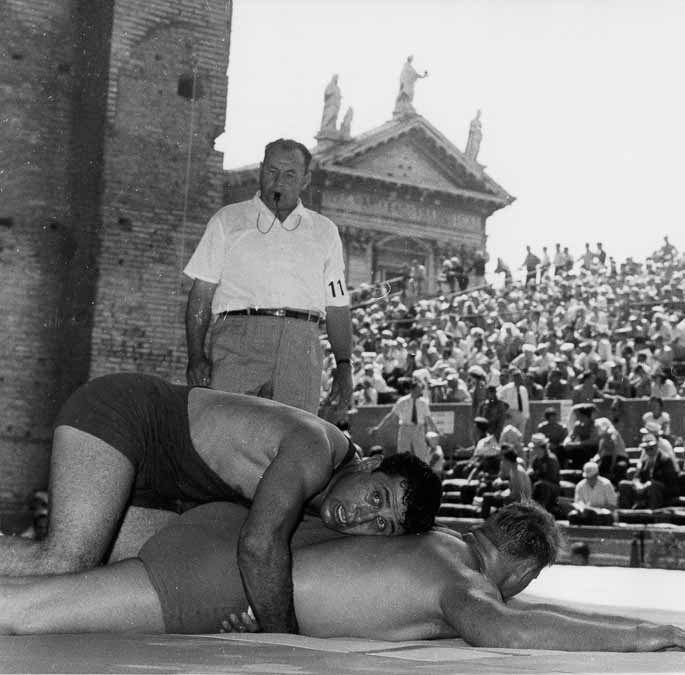
- Tarı vs. Svensson at the 1960 Olympics

Personal information
- Born: 1935 Ankara, Turkey
- Height: 187 cm (6 ft 2 in)

Sport
- Sport: Greco-Roman wrestling

Tan Tarı (born 1935) is a Turkish retired heavyweight Greco-Roman wrestler. He competed at the 1960 Summer Olympics and finished ninth.
