= Radoslav Kasabov =

Bulgarian wrestler

Personal information
- Nationality: Bulgarian
- Born: 30 January 1938 (age 87); Ruse, Bulgaria

Sport
- Sport: Wrestling

Radoslav Kasabov (born 30 January 1938) is a Bulgarian wrestler. He competed at the 1960 Summer Olympics and the 1964 Summer Olympics.
