= Petr Kment =

Medal record

Representing Czechoslovakia

Men's Greco-Roman wrestling

Olympic Games
Bronze medal – third place	1968 Mexico City	Heavyweight

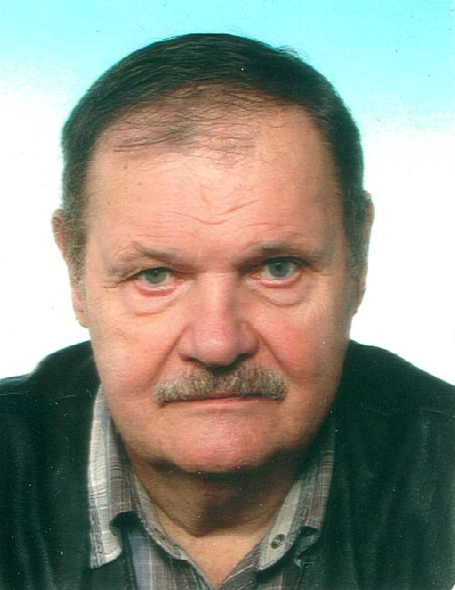
Petr Kment

Petr Kment (20 August 1942 − 22 August 2013) was a wrestler who competed for Czechoslovakia. He was born in Prague. He won an Olympic bronze medal in Greco-Roman wrestling in 1968. He also competed at the 1964 Olympics, where he placed fourth.
