= János Reznák =

Hungarian wrestler

Personal information
- Nationality: Hungarian
- Born: 12 December 1930 Cegléd, Hungary
- Died: 11 June 1988 (aged 57) Cegléd, Hungary

Sport
- Sport: Wrestling
Medal record
Representing Hungary
World Championships
Bronze medal – third place	1963 Sofia	+97 kg

János Reznák (12 December 1930 – 11 June 1988) was a Hungarian wrestler. He competed at the 1960 Summer Olympics and the 1964 Summer Olympics.
