= Lucjan Sosnowski =

Polish wrestler

Personal information
- Nationality: Polish
- Born: 6 January 1934; Skrzyniec, Poland
- Died: 4 September 1999 (aged 65); Kałuszyn, Poland

Sport
- Sport: Wrestling

Lucjan Sosnowski (6 January 1934 – 4 September 1999) was a Polish wrestler. He competed at the 1960 Summer Olympics and the 1964 Summer Olympics.
