= Ștefan Stîngu =

Romanian wrestler

Ştefan Stîngu (19 May 1941 – 2009) was a Romanian wrestler who competed in the 1964 Summer Olympics, in the 1968 Summer Olympics, and in the 1972 Summer Olympics.
