= Aleksandr Ivanitsky =

Soviet wrestler (1937–2020)

Medal record

Men's freestyle wrestling

Representing Soviet Union

Olympic Games
Gold medal – first place	1964 Tokyo	97 kg

World Championships
Gold medal – first place	1962 Toledo	97 kg
Gold medal – first place	1963 Sofia	97 kg
Gold medal – first place	1965 Manchester	97 kg
Gold medal – first place	1966 Toledo	97 kg

Aleksandr Vladimirovich Ivanitsky (Russian: Александр Владимирович Иваницкий; 10 December 1937 – 22 July 2020) was a Russian wrestler and Olympic champion in Freestyle wrestling who competed for the Soviet Union.
