= Viktor Ahven =

Finnish wrestler (1929–2013)

Personal information
- Nationality: Finland
- Born: 27 February 1929 Salmi, Finland
- Died: 13 March 2013 (aged 84)
- Height: 1.87 m (6 ft 2 in)

Sport
- Sport: Wrestling

Viktor Ahven (27 February 1929 – 13 March 2013) was a Finnish wrestler. He competed in the 1960 Summer Olympics.
