= István Kozma (wrestler) =

Hungarian Greco-Roman wrestler

Personal information
- Born: 27 November 1939 Budapest, Hungary
- Died: 9 April 1970 (aged 30) Budapest, Hungary
- Height: 1.98 m (6 ft 6 in)
- Weight: 125–140 kg (276–309 lb)

Sport
- Sport: Wrestling
- Event: Greco-Roman
- Club: Vasas Budapest
Medal record
Representing Hungary
Olympic Games
| Gold medal – first place | 1964 Tokyo | 97 kg |
| Gold medal – first place | 1968 Mexico City | 97 kg |
World Championships
| Bronze medal – third place | 1961 Yokohama | 87 kg |
| Gold medal – first place | 1962 Toledo | 97 kg |
| Silver medal – second place | 1965 Tampere | 97 kg |
| Gold medal – first place | 1966 Toledo | 97 kg |
| Gold medal – first place | 1967 Bucharest | 97 kg |
European Championships
| Silver medal – second place | 1966 Essen | 97 kg |
| Gold medal – first place | 1967 Minsk | 97 kg |
| Silver medal – second place | 1968 Västerås | 97 kg |

István Kozma (27 November 1939 – 9 April 1970) was a Hungarian Greco-Roman wrestler. He won Olympic gold medals in 1964 and in 1968, and the World Championship in 1962, 1966, and 1967. In 1967 he was selected as the Hungarian Sportsman of the Year. Kozma died in a car accident, aged 30.

Awards
| Preceded by András Balczó | Hungarian Sportsman of The Year; 1967 | Succeeded by Gyula Zsivótzky |
