= Wilfried Dietrich =

German wrestler (1933–1992)

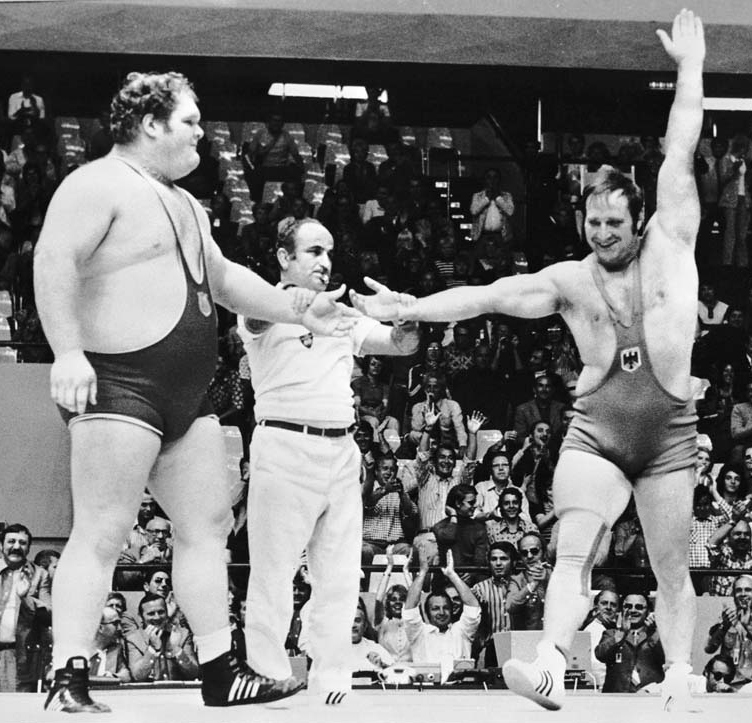
- Taylor and Dietrich (right) at the 1972 Olympics

Personal information
- Born: 14 October 1933 Schifferstadt, Germany
- Died: 2 June 1992 (aged 58) Durbanville, South Africa
- Height: 1.84 m (6 ft 0 in)
- Weight: 118 kg (260 lb)

Sport
- Sport: Greco-Roman wrestling Freestyle wrestling
- Club: VfK Schifferstadt; ASV Mainz 1888
Medal record
Representing Germany
Olympic Games
Gold medal – first place	1960 Rome	Freestyle +87 kg
Silver medal – second place	1956 Melbourne	Greco-Roman +87 kg
Silver medal – second place	1960 Rome	Greco-Roman +87 kg
Bronze medal – third place	1964 Tokyo	Greco-Roman +97 kg
Representing West Germany
Olympic Games
Bronze medal – third place	1968 Mexico City	Freestyle +97 kg
World Championships
Gold medal – first place	1961 Yokohama	Freestyle +87 kg
Silver medal – second place	1957 Istanbul	Freestyle +87 kg
Silver medal – second place	1969 Mar del Plata	Greco-Roman +100 kg
Bronze medal – third place	1962 Toledo	Freestyle +97 kg
Bronze medal – third place	1962 Toledo	Greco-Roman +97 kg
European Championships
Gold medal – first place	1967 Minsk	Freestyle +97 kg

Wilfried Dietrich (14 October 1933 – 2 June 1992) was a German heavyweight wrestler. Between 1956 and 1972 he took part in five Olympics and six world championships, often entering both the freestyle and Greco-Roman wrestling contests – a feat unmatched by any other wrestler. He won five Olympic and five world championship medals, becoming an Olympic (1960), World (1961) and European champion (1967). Between 1955 and 1962 he won all his freestyle bouts.

In 1968 Dietrich was selected as the Olympic flag bearer for West Germany at its first appearance at the Summer Olympics; he won a bronze medal at those games. He failed to medal at his last Olympics in 1972, yet he produced the most spectacular victory of his career by throwing over his back the 182 kg American Chris Taylor in the Greco-Roman contest. Dietrich lost to Taylor in their freestyle bout. In 2008 he was inducted into the Germany's Sports Hall of Fame and in 2014 to the International Wrestling Hall of Fame.
