= Mogoșani =

- Commune
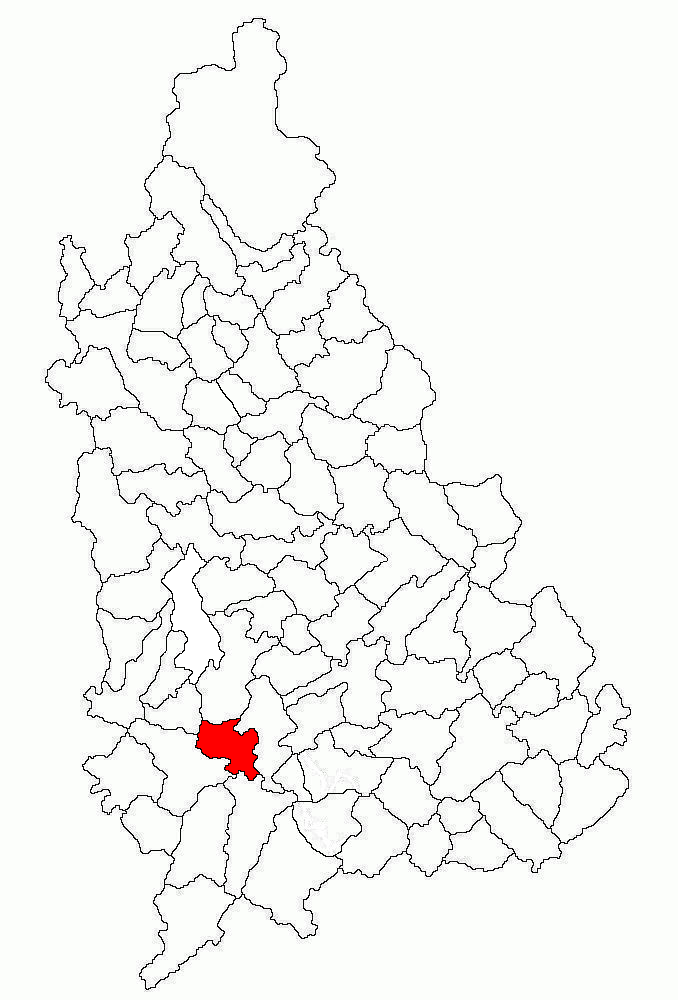
- Location in Dâmbovița County

- Location in Romania
- Coordinates: 44°41′N 25°24′E
- Country: Romania
- County: Dâmbovița

Government
  - Mayor (2024–2028): Nicolae Tuță (PNL)
- Area: 30.92 km^{2} (11.94 sq mi)
- Elevation: 172 m (564 ft)
- Population (2021-12-01): 4,051
  - Density: 130/km^{2} (340/sq mi)
- Time zone: EET/EEST (UTC+2/+3)
- Postal code: 137305
- Area code: +(40) 245
- Vehicle reg.: DB
- Website: mogosani.ro

Mogoșani is a commune in Dâmbovița County, Muntenia, Romania with a population of 4,051 people as of 2021. It is composed of five villages: Chirca, Cojocaru, Merii, Mogoșani, and Zăvoiu.

Historical population
Year	Pop.	±%
2002	4,611	—
2011	4,444	−3.6%
2021	4,051	−8.8%
Source: Census data

== Natives ==
- Constantin Bușoiu (1941–2022), wrestler
- George Leață (born 2004), footballer
