= Ragnar Svensson (wrestler) =

Swedish wrestler (1934–2025)

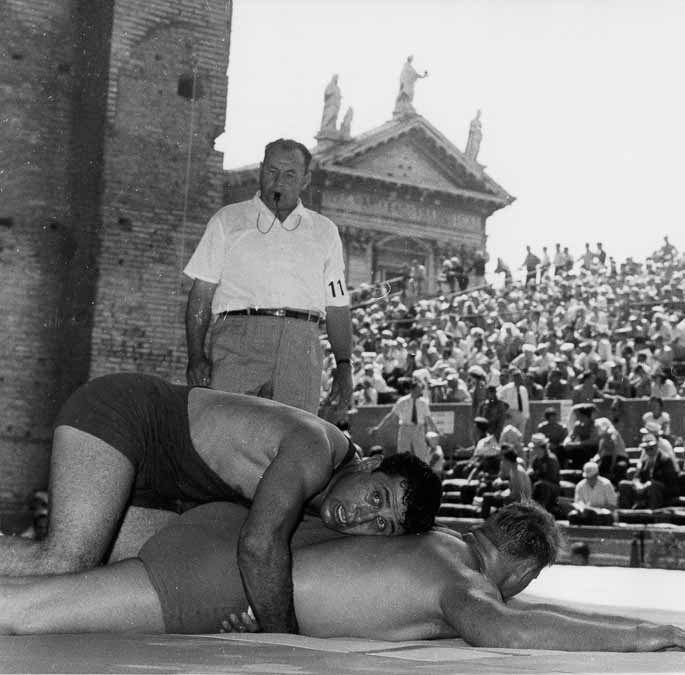
- Svensson vs. Tan Tarı at the 1960 Olympics

Personal information
- Born: 22 June 1934 Osby, Sweden
- Died: 23 March 2025 (aged 90)
- Height: 186 cm (6 ft 1 in)
- Weight: 110 kg (243 lb)

Sport
- Sport: Greco-Roman wrestling
- Club: Klippans BK
Medal record
Representing Sweden
World Championships
Silver medal – second place	1963 Helsingborg	+97 kg
European Championships
Bronze medal – third place	1968 Västerås	+97 kg

Sten Ragnar Svensson (22 June 1934 – 23 March 2025) was a heavyweight Greco-Roman wrestler from Sweden. He won a silver medal at the 1963 World Championships, finishing fourth in 1958 and 1961. He competed at the 1960, 1964 and 1968 Olympics and placed eighth, fifth and fourth, respectively. He died on 23 March 2025, at the age of 90.
