= Deaths in May 1996 =

The following is a list of notable deaths in May 1996.

Entries for each day are listed alphabetically by surname. A typical entry lists information in the following sequence:

- Name, age, country of citizenship at birth, subsequent country of citizenship (if applicable), reason for notability, cause of death (if known), and reference.

== May 1996 ==
=== 1 ===
- Herbert Brownell, 92, American politician, cancer.
- Billy Byers, 69, American jazz trombonist and arranger.
- François Chalais, 76, French journalist, leukemia.
- Jim Gleeson, 84, American baseball player (Cleveland Indians, Chicago Cubs, Cincinnati Reds).
- Eric Houghton, 85, English football player and manager.
- David M. Kennedy, 90, American diplomat, cardiovascular disease.
- Luana Patten, 57, American actress (Song of the South, Johnny Tremain, Joe Dakota), respiratory failure.

=== 2 ===
- Emile Habibi, 74, Palestinian-Israeli writer and communist politician, cancer.
- Pinky Jorgensen, 81, American baseball player (Cincinnati Reds).
- Danny Kamekona, 60, American actor (The Karate Kid Part II, Problem Child, Honeymoon in Vegas).
- María Luisa Ponte, 77, Spanish actress.
- Tony Romeo, 58, American football player (Dallas Texans, Boston Patriots).
- Henri Rust, 89, Dutch film editor.
- Douglas Houghton, Baron Houghton of Sowerby, 97, British politician.
- Eugen Wiesberger Jr., 62, Austrian Olympic wrestler (1956, 1960, 1964).

=== 3 ===
- Guy Casaril, 62, French film director.
- Jimmy Everett, 87, American baseball player.
- Donald G. Fink, 84, American engineer.
- Tim Gullikson, 44, American tennis player and coach, brain cancer.
- Anna Jordaens, 68, Belgian Olympic gymnast (1948).
- Alex Kellner, 71, American baseball player (Philadelphia/Kansas City Athletics, Cincinnati Redlegs, St. Louis Cardinals).
- Hermann Kesten, 96, German writer.
- Detlev Kittstein, 52, German Olympic field hockey player (1968, 1972).
- Patsy Montana, 87, American country music singer-songwriter.
- Ray Stevens, 60, American professional wrestler, heart attack.
- Jack Weston, 71, American actor (Dirty Dancing, The Thomas Crown Affair, The Ritz), lymphoma.
- Keith Daniel Williams, 48, American murderer, execution by lethal injection.

=== 4 ===
- Jean Crépin, 87, French Army officer during World War II, the First Indochina War and the Algerian War.
- Roy Cullinan, 63, Australian rules footballer.
- Edward E. Haddock, 84, American politician.
- Gus Keriazakos, 64, American baseball player (Chicago White Sox, Washington Senators, Kansas City Athletics).
- Eduardo Franco Raymundo, 62, Spanish chess player.

=== 5 ===
- Gaëtan Duval, 65, Mauritian politician.
- Earl Hastings, 72, Canadian politician, member of the Senate of Canada (1966-).
- David Lasser, 94, American writer and political activist.
- Rodney M. Love, 87, American politician, member of the United States House of Representatives (1965–1967).
- Jokūbas Minkevičius, 75, Lithuanian politician.
- Roy O'Donnell, 88, Australian rules footballer.
- Ai Qing, 86, Chinese poet.
- Salli Terri, 73, Canadian-American singer and arranger.
- Włodzimierz Zawadzki, 84, Polish Olympic rower (1936).
- Charles H. Zimmerman, 88, American aeronautical engineer.

=== 6 ===
- Donald T. Campbell, 79, American psychologist and scholar.
- Geoffrey S. Dawes, 78, British fetal physiologist.
- Ed Love, 85, American animator.
- Hamlet Mkhitaryan, 33, Soviet/Russian football player, brain cancer.
- Wally Nightingale, 40, British musician, drug-related illness.
- Suzanne Ridgeway, 78, American film actress.
- Leo Joseph Suenens, 91, Belgian Roman Catholic cardinal, thrombosis.
- Ko van Tongeren, 82, Dutch Olympic canoeist (1936).

=== 7 ===
- William Copley, 77, American painter, writer, and gallerist.
- Sigurður Jónsson, 37, Icelandic Olympic alpine skier (1976, 1980).
- Don McNeill, 88, American radio personality.
- Albert Meltzer, 76, British anarchist.
- Narciso G. Reyes, 82, Filipino diplomat and author.
- José Lázaro Robles, 72, Brazilian football player.
- Howard Smith, 76, British diplomat.
- Draško Vilfan, 82, Slovenian Olympic swimmer (1936).

=== 8 ===
- Beryl Burton, 58, English racing cyclist, heart attack.
- Serge Chermayeff, 95, Russian-British architect, industrial designer, and writer.
- Luis Miguel Dominguín, 69, Spanish bullfighter, cerebral hemorrhage.
- Robert Geib, 84, Luxembourgish Olympic football player (1936).
- Ludwig Hoelscher, 88, German composer, musician and music educator.
- Bill Naito, 70, American businessman, civic leader and philanthropist, cancer.
- Emy Pettersson, 87, Swedish Olympic sprinter (1928).
- Celedonio Romero, 83, Spanish musician.
- Karl Ullrich, 85, German SS officer during World War II.
- Garth Williams, 84, American children's illustrator.

=== 9 ===
- Khaptad Baba, 116, Nepalese spiritual saint.
- Lu Dingyi, 89, Chinese politician.
- Carl Fallberg, 80, American cartoonist and artist.
- Gustave Gingras, 78, Canadian physician.
- Calvin Waller, 58, United States Army lieutenant general, complications from a heart attack.

=== 10 ===
- Jože Babič, 79, Slovenian filmmaker.
- Margaret Bell, 79, Canadian high jumper and Olympian (1936).
- Poul Borum, 61, Danish poet and writer.
- Ronald Bush, 87, New Zealand sportsman.
- Joe Holden, 82, American baseball player (Philadelphia Phillies), manager and scout.
- Alex Newkirk, 79, American baseball player.
- Ethel Smith, 93, American organist.
- Curt Teichert, 91, German-American palaeontologist and geologist.
- Don John Young, 85, American district judge (United States District Court for the Northern District of Ohio).

=== 11 ===
- Nnamdi Azikiwe, 91, President of Nigeria.
- Ademir de Menezes, 73, Brazilian football player and manager.
- Col Geelan, 69, Australian rugby league footballer and coach.
- Kurao Hiroshima, 67, Japanese long-distance runner and Olympian (1956, 1960).
- Øivind Johannessen, 71, Norwegian football player.
- Bob Pfohl, 69, American football player (Baltimore Colts).
- Sam Ragan, 80, American poet.
- Vittorio Sala, 77, Italian screenwriter and film director.
- Princess Maria de los Dolores of Bourbon-Two Sicilies, 86, Sicilian princess.
- Mikheil Tumanishvili, 75, Soviet theatre director.
- Merrill B. Twining, 93, United States Marine Corps general.
- Ivan Vyshnevskyi, 39, Ukrainian football player, melanoma.
- Margaret Wright, 76, American politician and community activist.
- Notable Americans killed in the plane crash of ValuJet Flight 592:
  - Rodney Culver, 26, American football player (Indianapolis Colts, San Diego Chargers).
  - Walter Hyatt, 46, singer and songwriter.
  - Candi Kubeck, 35, airline pilot.
- Notable climbers killed in the 1996 Mount Everest disaster
  - Scott Fischer, 40, American mountaineer.
  - Rob Hall, 35, New Zealand mountaineer.
  - Yasuko Namba, 47, Japanese businesswoman.
  - Andy Harris, 31, New Zealand mountain guide.

=== 12 ===
- Ghazaleh Alizadeh, 47, Iranian poet and writer, suicide.
- Richard Kendall Brooke, 66, South African ornithologist.
- Max Carlos, 60, Australian Olympic boxer (1956).
- Chang Eun-kyung, 44, South Korean Olympic judoka (1976).
- Homer Keller, 81, American composer of contemporary classical music.
- Stan Priddy, 75, American Olympic ice hockey player (1948).
- Mohamed Abdel Rahman, 81, Egyptian fencer and Olympian (1936, 1948, 1952).
- Martin Roman, 86, German jazz pianist.

=== 13 ===
- Fred Barnes, 75, Australian rules footballer.
- Harry Hyde, 71, American NASCAR crew chief, myocardial infarction.
- William Hughes Mulligan, 78, American judge.
- Morris Edward Opler, 89, American anthropologist.
- Chaim Menachem Rabin, 80, Israeli linguist.

=== 14 ===
- Marian Barone, 72, American gymnast and Olympian (1948, 1952).
- Vera Chapman, 98, British writer.
- Edward Gurney, 82, American attorney and politician.
- Jan Hertl, 67, Czech football player.
- Sridharan Jeganathan, 44, Sri Lankan cricket player.
- Henry Norrström, 78, Swedish Olympic long-distance runner (1952).
- Ludwig Preiß, 85, German politician.
- Dick Randall, 70, American filmmaker.
- Adone Stellin, 75, Italian association football player and Olympian (1948).
- Kumi Sugai, 77, Japanese painter, sculptor and printmaker.
- Antero Tukiainen, 80, Finnish Olympic rower (1952).
- Usilaimani, 62, Tamil actor.
- Leopold Šťastný, 84, Czechoslovak soccer player and coach.

=== 15 ===
- Nordine Ben Ali, 76, Algerian-French football player and manager.
- Charles B. Fulton, 86, American district judge (United States District Court for the Southern District of Florida).
- Javier del Granado, 83, Bolivian writer.
- Iosif Matusec, 89, Romanian Olympic gymnast (1936).
- Newt V. Mills, 96, American politician, member of the United States House of Representatives (1937–1943).
- Paul Nogier, 87, French neurologist and physician.
- Virgil Walter Ross, 88, American animator.
- Eric Thompson, 68, British cyclist and Olympian (1956, 1960).

=== 16 ===
- Danilo Alvim, 75, Brazilian football player and manager, pneumonia.
- Jeremy Michael Boorda, 56, American admiral, suicide.
- Claude Gordon, 80, American trumpeter, band director, educator, and author, cancer.
- Olga Madar, 80, American labor unionist.

=== 17 ===
- Scott Brayton, 37, American open-wheel racing driver, racing accident.
- Willis Conover, 75, American radio producer, lung cancer.
- Mary Haas, 86, American linguist.
- Rusi Modi, 71, Indian cricket player.
- Nick Origlass, 88, Australian Trotskyist politician.
- Johnny "Guitar" Watson, 61, American musician and singer-songwriter, myocardial infarction.

=== 18 ===
- Czesław Bobrowski, 92, Polish politician and economist.
- Mario Braggiotti, 90, American pianist, composer and raconteur.
- Dawee Chullasapya, 81, Thai Air Force air marshal.
- Chet Forte, 60, American television director and sports radio talk show host, heart attack.
- Kevin Gilbert, 29, American musician, accidental asphyxiation.
- Yosef Porat, 86, German-Israeli chess player.
- T. B. Werapitiya, 71, Sri Lankan cricket player.

=== 19 ===
- John Beradino, 79, American baseball player and actor, pancreatic cancer.
- Herbert Büchs, 82, German Air Force officer.
- Jake Ford, 50, American basketball player (Seattle SuperSonics).
- Hideji Hōjō, 93, Japanese author, novelist, and playwright.
- Janaki Ramachandran, 72, Indian actor and politician, cardiac arrest.
- Margaret Rawlings, 89, English actress.
- Charles Verlinden, 89, Belgian medievalist.
- Zygmunt Ziembiński, 75, Polish legal philosopher and logician.

=== 20 ===
- Bimal Bose, 77, Indian cricketer.
- Noè Cruciani, 33, Italian Olympic boxer (1984).
- Jean-Jacques Delbo, 87, French actor.
- Dean Harens, 75, American actor.
- Bill Kempling, 75, Canadian politician, member of the House of Commons of Canada (1972–1993).
- Filiberto Manzo, 66, Mexican Olympic basketball player (1952).
- Jon Pertwee, 76, English actor, comedian, cabaret performer and TV presenter, heart attack.
- Janez Vidic, 73, Slovene painter and illustrator.

=== 21 ===
- Vladimir Belyakov, 78, Soviet Olympic gymnast (1952).
- Paul Delph, 39, American musician.
- Raffaele di Paco, 87, Italian road racing cyclist.
- Karl Hoffmann, 81, German Indologist.
- Arvo Huutoniemi, 82, Finnish Olympic discus thrower (1948, 1952).
- Fernando Volio Jiménez, 71, Costa Rican politician.
- Lash LaRue, 78, American actor, pulmonary emphysema.
- Fritz Ligges, 57, German Olympic equestrian (1964, 1972, 1984), heart attack.

=== 22 ===
- Robert Christie, 82, Canadian actor and director.
- Émile Frantz, 86, Luxembourgian Olympic wrestler (1928).
- Cuthbert Hurd, 85, American computer scientist and entrepreneur.
- Seymour H. Knox III, 70, American sports executive.
- Veikko Lavi, 84, Finnish singer, songwriter and writer.
- Maurice Piot, 83, French Olympic fencer (1952).
- Rex Rogers, 79, Australian cricketer.
- George H. Smith, 73, American writer.
- Wong Peng Soon, 78, Malaysian badminton player, pneumonia.

=== 23 ===
- Abu Ubaidah al-Banshiri, 46, Egyptian al-Qaeda leader, drowned.
- Patrick Cargill, 77, English actor, brain cancer.
- Dorothy Hyson, 81, American actress, stroke.
- Sim Iness, 65, American Olympic discus thrower (1952).
- Evert Karlsson, 75, Swedish ski jumper and Olympian (1948).
- Bernhard Klodt, 69, German football player, heart attack.
- Kronid Lyubarsky, 62, Soviet dissident, heart attack.
- Tanju Okan, 57, Turkish recording artist and singer, cirrhosis.
- Peter Pasetti, 79, German actor, cancer.
- Yevgeny Rodionov, 19, Russian soldier, execution by beheading.
- Eric Thompson, 68, British cyclist and Olympian (1956, 1960).

=== 24 ===
- John Abbott, 90, English actor.
- Jorge Bolaños, 51, Ecuadorian football player.
- Harry Campion, 91, British statistician and director.
- Thomas Connolly, 86,United States Navy admiral, aviator, gymnast and Olympic medalist (1932).
- José Cuatrecasas, 93, Spanish-American pharmacist and botanist.
- Fred Dhu, 80, Australian rugby league footballer.
- Jacob Druckman, 67, American composer, lung cancer.
- Enrique Álvarez Félix, 62, Mexican actor, heart attack.
- Charley Hall, 71, American baseball player.
- Johan Kraag, 82, President of Suriname.
- Joseph Mitchell, 87, American writer.
- Kshitindramohan Naha, 64, Indian geologist and professor.
- Lois Pereiro, 38, Spanish poet and writer, AIDS-related complications.
- Norman René, 45, American director, AIDS-related complications.
- Roland Varno, 88, Dutch-American actor and secret agent.

=== 25 ===
- Bill Crass, 84, American football player (Chicago Cardinals).
- Arch Dickens, 92, Australian rules footballer.
- Renzo De Felice, 67, Italian historian.
- John Morrison, 1st Baron Margadale, 89, British politician.
- Guy Mazeline, 96, French writer.
- Bradley Nowell, 28, American musician and the lead singer and guitarist of Sublime, opioid overdose.
- Vladimir Ukhov, 72, Russian Olympic racewalker (1952).
- Barney Wilen, 59, French saxophonist.
- Dimitar Yordanov, 66, Bulgarian football player.

=== 26 ===
- Ole Berntsen, 81, Danish Olympic sailor (1948, 1952, 1956, 1964).
- Don Bollweg, 75, American baseball player (St. Louis Cardinals, New York Yankees, Philadelphia/Kansas City Athletics).
- Frank Briante, 91, American football player.
- Haika Grossman, 76, Israeli politician and member of Knesset.
- Gerard Hallock, 90, American Olympic ice hockey player (1932).
- Stefan Jędrychowski, 86, Polish journalist and communist politician.
- Geraldo de Oliveira, 76, Brazilian Olympic jumper (1948, 1952).
- Ovidiu Papadima, 86, Romanian literary critic, folklorist, and essayist.
- Milan Ribar, 66, Yugoslav/Croatian football manager.
- Heije Schaper, 89, Dutch lieutenant general of the Royal Netherlands Air Force and politician.
- Mike Sharperson, 34, American baseball player (Toronto Blue Jays, Los Angeles Dodgers, Atlanta Braves), accident.

=== 27 ===
- George Boolos, 55, American philosopher and mathematical logician, pancreatic cancer.
- Pud Brown, 79, American jazz reed player.
- Aksel Bonde Hansen, 77, Danish Olympic rower (1948).
- Philip B. Healey, 74, American politician.
- Els van den Horn, 69, Dutch Olympic diver (1952).

=== 28 ===
- Walter Brandi, 68, Italian actor.
- Nirmala Devi, 68, Indian film actress and singer.
- George Kojac, 86, American swimmer and Olympic champion (1928).
- Pentti Paatsalo, 63, Finnish Olympic swimmer (1952).
- Rollin Prather, 70, Canadian football player.
- Jimmy Rowles, 77, American jazz pianist, vocalist, and composer.

=== 29 ===
- Jennings Lang, 81, American actor, pneumonia.
- Isidro Maiztegui, 90, Argentinian composer.
- Antonín Mrkos, 78, Czech astronomer.
- Robert Nichol, 72, Scottish cricketer.
- Hrant Shahinyan, 72, Soviet/Armenian gymnast and Olympian (1952).
- Jeremy Sinden, 45, British actor, lung cancer.
- Tamara Toumanova, 77, Russian ballet dancer.

=== 30 ===
- John Cameron, Lord Cameron, 96, Scottish judge.
- Heather Canning, 63, English actress.
- William Dally, 88, American Olympic rower (1928).
- Léon-Étienne Duval, 92, French catholic prelate and cardinal.
- François Genoud, 80, Swiss Nazi collaborator, suicide.
- John Kahn, 48, American bass guitarist.
- Alo Mattiisen, 35, Estonian composer.
- Arthur "T-Boy" Ross, 47, American singer-songwriter.
- Natividad Vacío, 83, American actor.

=== 31 ===
- Walter C. Beckham, 80, United States Army Air Forces fighter ace and nuclear scientist.
- Don Kerley, 79, Australian rules footballer.
- Ton de Leeuw, 69, Dutch composer.
- Luciano Lama, 74, Italian politician and trade unionist.
- Timothy Leary, 75, American psychologist and writer, prostate cancer.
- Thomas Francis Xavier Smith, 67, American politician, cancer.
