= Wrestling at the 1964 Summer Olympics – Men's Greco-Roman middleweight =

Wrestling at the Olympics

Men's Greco-Roman middleweight at the Games of the XVIII Olympiad
- Venue: Komazawa Gymnasium
- Dates: 16–19 October 1964
- Competitors: 20 from 20 nations

Medalists
| 1st place, gold medalist(s) | | Branislav Simić | Yugoslavia |
| 2nd place, silver medalist(s) | | Jiří Kormaník | Czechoslovakia |
| 3rd place, bronze medalist(s) | | Lothar Metz | United Team of Germany |

The men's Greco-Roman middleweight competition at the 1964 Summer Olympics in Tokyo took place from 16 to 19 October at the Komazawa Gymnasium. Nations were limited to one competitor. Middleweight was the third-heaviest category, including wrestlers weighing 78 to 87 kilograms (172.0 to 191.8 lb).

== Competition format ==
This Greco-Roman wrestling competition continued to use the "bad points" elimination system introduced at the 1928 Summer Olympics for Greco-Roman and at the 1932 Summer Olympics for freestyle wrestling, as adjusted at the 1960 Summer Olympics. Each bout awarded 4 points. If the victory was by fall, the winner received 0 and the loser 4. If the victory was by decision, the winner received 1 and the loser 3. If the bout was tied, each wrestler received 2 points. A wrestler who accumulated 6 or more points was eliminated. Rounds continued until there were 3 or fewer uneliminated wrestlers. If only 1 wrestler remained, he received the gold medal. If 2 wrestlers remained, point totals were ignored and they faced each other for gold and silver (if they had already wrestled each other, that result was used). If 3 wrestlers remained, point totals were ignored and a round-robin was held among those 3 to determine medals (with previous head-to-head results, if any, counting for this round-robin).

== Results ==
=== Round 1 ===
Andhalkar withdrew after his bout.

Bouts

| Winner | Nation | Victory Type | Loser | Nation |
|---|---|---|---|---|
| Gheorghe Popovici | Romania | Tie | Valentin Olenik | Soviet Union |
| Lothar Metz | United Team of Germany | Decision | Czesław Kwieciński | Poland |
| Stig Persson | Sweden | Decision | Raymond Schummer | Luxembourg |
| Jiří Kormaník | Czechoslovakia | Fall | Kenjiro Hiraki | Japan |
| Yavuz Selekman | Turkey | Decision | Istvan Raskovy | Australia |
| Max Kobelt | Switzerland | Fall | Fernando García | Philippines |
| Krali Bimbalov | Bulgaria | Fall | Lee Gi-yeol | South Korea |
| Pentti Punkari | Finland | Decision | Julio Graffigna | Argentina |
| Branislav Simić | Yugoslavia | Decision | Géza Hollósi | Hungary |
| Wayne Baughman | United States | Decision | Ganpat Andhalkar | India |

Points

| Rank | Wrestler | Nation | R1 |
|---|---|---|---|
| 1 | Krali Bimbalov | Bulgaria | 0 |
| 1 | Max Kobelt | Switzerland | 0 |
| 1 | Jiří Kormaník | Czechoslovakia | 0 |
| 4 | Wayne Baughman | United States | 1 |
| 4 | Lothar Metz | United Team of Germany | 1 |
| 4 | Stig Persson | Sweden | 1 |
| 4 | Pentti Punkari | Finland | 1 |
| 4 | Yavuz Selekman | Turkey | 1 |
| 4 | Branislav Simić | Yugoslavia | 1 |
| 10 | Valentin Olenik | Soviet Union | 2 |
| 10 | Gheorghe Popovici | Romania | 2 |
| 12 | Julio Graffigna | Argentina | 3 |
| 12 | Géza Hollósi | Hungary | 3 |
| 12 | Czesław Kwieciński | Poland | 3 |
| 12 | Istvan Raskovy | Australia | 3 |
| 12 | Raymond Schummer | Luxembourg | 3 |
| 17 | Kenjiro Hiraki | Japan | 4 |
| 17 | Fernando García | Philippines | 4 |
| 17 | Lee Gi-yeol | South Korea | 4 |
| 20 | Ganpat Andhalkar | India | 3* |

=== Round 2 ===
Five wrestlers were eliminated, leaving 14 to continue on. There was a three-way tie for the lead at 1 point.

Bouts

| Winner | Nation | Victory Type | Loser | Nation |
|---|---|---|---|---|
| Kenjiro Hiraki | Japan | Decision | Raymond Schummer | Luxembourg |
| Istvan Raskovy | Australia | Fall | Fernando García | Philippines |
| Lothar Metz | United Team of Germany | Decision | Gheorghe Popovici | Romania |
| Krali Bimbalov | Bulgaria | Decision | Pentti Punkari | Finland |
| Yavuz Selekman | Turkey | Decision | Max Kobelt | Switzerland |
| Valentin Olenik | Soviet Union | Decision | Czesław Kwieciński | Poland |
| Géza Hollósi | Hungary | Fall | Lee Gi-yeol | South Korea |
| Branislav Simić | Yugoslavia | Fall | Julio Graffigna | Argentina |
| Stig Persson | Sweden | Tie | Jiří Kormaník | Czechoslovakia |
| Wayne Baughman | United States | Bye | N/A | N/A |

Points

| Rank | Wrestler | Nation | R1 | R2 | Total |
|---|---|---|---|---|---|
| 1 | Wayne Baughman | United States | 1 | 0 | 1 |
| 1 | Krali Bimbalov | Bulgaria | 0 | 1 | 1 |
| 1 | Branislav Simić | Yugoslavia | 1 | 0 | 1 |
| 4 | Jiří Kormaník | Czechoslovakia | 0 | 2 | 2 |
| 4 | Lothar Metz | United Team of Germany | 1 | 1 | 2 |
| 4 | Yavuz Selekman | Turkey | 1 | 1 | 2 |
| 7 | Géza Hollósi | Hungary | 3 | 0 | 3 |
| 7 | Max Kobelt | Switzerland | 0 | 3 | 3 |
| 7 | Valentin Olenik | Soviet Union | 2 | 1 | 3 |
| 7 | Stig Persson | Sweden | 1 | 2 | 3 |
| 7 | Istvan Raskovy | Australia | 3 | 0 | 3 |
| 12 | Pentti Punkari | Finland | 1 | 3 | 4 |
| 13 | Kenjiro Hiraki | Japan | 4 | 1 | 5 |
| 13 | Gheorghe Popovici | Romania | 2 | 3 | 5 |
| 15 | Czesław Kwieciński | Poland | 3 | 3 | 6 |
| 15 | Raymond Schummer | Luxembourg | 3 | 3 | 6 |
| 17 | Julio Graffigna | Argentina | 3 | 4 | 7 |
| 18 | Fernando García | Philippines | 4 | 4 | 8 |
| 18 | Lee Gi-yeol | South Korea | 4 | 4 | 8 |

=== Round 3 ===
Another 5 wrestlers were eliminated, leaving 9 remaining. Simić had the best score at 2 points.

Bouts

| Winner | Nation | Victory Type | Loser | Nation |
|---|---|---|---|---|
| Valentin Olenik | Soviet Union | Decision | Lothar Metz | United Team of Germany |
| Stig Persson | Sweden | Tie | Kenjiro Hiraki | Japan |
| Jiří Kormaník | Czechoslovakia | Decision | Istvan Raskovy | Australia |
| Yavuz Selekman | Turkey | Tie | Krali Bimbalov | Bulgaria |
| Géza Hollósi | Hungary | Fall | Max Kobelt | Switzerland |
| Branislav Simić | Yugoslavia | Decision | Pentti Punkari | Finland |
| Gheorghe Popovici | Romania | Decision | Wayne Baughman | United States |

Points

| Rank | Wrestler | Nation | R1 | R2 | R3 | Total |
|---|---|---|---|---|---|---|
| 1 | Branislav Simić | Yugoslavia | 1 | 0 | 1 | 2 |
| 2 | Krali Bimbalov | Bulgaria | 0 | 1 | 2 | 3 |
| 2 | Géza Hollósi | Hungary | 3 | 0 | 0 | 3 |
| 2 | Jiří Kormaník | Czechoslovakia | 0 | 2 | 1 | 3 |
| 5 | Wayne Baughman | United States | 1 | 0 | 3 | 4 |
| 5 | Valentin Olenik | Soviet Union | 2 | 1 | 1 | 4 |
| 5 | Yavuz Selekman | Turkey | 1 | 1 | 2 | 4 |
| 8 | Lothar Metz | United Team of Germany | 1 | 1 | 3 | 5 |
| 8 | Stig Persson | Sweden | 1 | 2 | 2 | 5 |
| 10 | Gheorghe Popovici | Romania | 2 | 3 | 1 | 6 |
| 10 | Istvan Raskovy | Australia | 3 | 0 | 3 | 6 |
| 12 | Kenjiro Hiraki | Japan | 4 | 1 | 2 | 7 |
| 12 | Max Kobelt | Switzerland | 0 | 3 | 4 | 7 |
| 12 | Pentti Punkari | Finland | 1 | 3 | 3 | 7 |

=== Round 4 ===
Three wrestlers were eliminated. Simić had a bye and continued to hold the lead at 2 points.

Bouts

| Winner | Nation | Victory Type | Loser | Nation |
|---|---|---|---|---|
| Valentin Olenik | Soviet Union | Decision | Wayne Baughman | United States |
| Lothar Metz | United Team of Germany | Fall | Stig Persson | Sweden |
| Jiří Kormaník | Czechoslovakia | Decision | Yavuz Selekman | Turkey |
| Krali Bimbalov | Bulgaria | Tie | Géza Hollósi | Hungary |
| Branislav Simić | Yugoslavia | Bye | N/A | N/A |

Points

| Rank | Wrestler | Nation | R1 | R2 | R3 | R4 | Total |
|---|---|---|---|---|---|---|---|
| 1 | Branislav Simić | Yugoslavia | 1 | 0 | 1 | 0 | 2 |
| 2 | Jiří Kormaník | Czechoslovakia | 0 | 2 | 1 | 1 | 4 |
| 3 | Krali Bimbalov | Bulgaria | 0 | 1 | 2 | 2 | 5 |
| 3 | Géza Hollósi | Hungary | 3 | 0 | 0 | 2 | 5 |
| 3 | Lothar Metz | United Team of Germany | 1 | 1 | 3 | 0 | 5 |
| 3 | Valentin Olenik | Soviet Union | 2 | 1 | 1 | 1 | 5 |
| 7 | Wayne Baughman | United States | 1 | 0 | 3 | 3 | 7 |
| 7 | Yavuz Selekman | Turkey | 1 | 1 | 2 | 3 | 7 |
| 9 | Stig Persson | Sweden | 1 | 2 | 2 | 4 | 9 |

=== Round 5 ===
The fifth round eliminated 5 of 6 wrestlers, all but Simić (who thereby won the gold medal). The tie for 4th place was not broken; both men shared that result. The tie for the silver and bronze medals, however, needed to be broken by a head-to-head match in the final round.

Bouts

| Winner | Nation | Victory Type | Loser | Nation |
|---|---|---|---|---|
| Branislav Simić | Yugoslavia | Tie | Valentin Olenik | Soviet Union |
| Lothar Metz | United Team of Germany | Decision | Krali Bimbalov | Bulgaria |
| Jiří Kormaník | Czechoslovakia | Tie | Géza Hollósi | Hungary |

Points

| Rank | Wrestler | Nation | R1 | R2 | R3 | R4 | R5 | Total |
|---|---|---|---|---|---|---|---|---|
| 1st place, gold medalist(s) | Branislav Simić | Yugoslavia | 1 | 0 | 1 | 0 | 2 | 4 |
| 2 | Jiří Kormaník | Czechoslovakia | 0 | 2 | 1 | 1 | 2 | 6 |
| 2 | Lothar Metz | United Team of Germany | 1 | 1 | 3 | 0 | 1 | 6 |
| 4 | Géza Hollósi | Hungary | 3 | 0 | 0 | 2 | 2 | 7 |
| 4 | Valentin Olenik | Soviet Union | 2 | 1 | 1 | 1 | 2 | 7 |
| 6 | Krali Bimbalov | Bulgaria | 0 | 1 | 2 | 2 | 3 | 8 |

=== Final round ===
In a tie-breaker bout to determine the silver and bronze medals, Kormaník defeated Metz by decision.

Bouts

| Winner | Nation | Victory Type | Loser | Nation |
|---|---|---|---|---|
| Jiří Kormaník | Czechoslovakia | Decision | Lothar Metz | United Team of Germany |

Points

| Rank | Wrestler | Nation | Points |
|---|---|---|---|
| 2nd place, silver medalist(s) | Jiří Kormaník | Czechoslovakia | 1 |
| 3rd place, bronze medalist(s) | Lothar Metz | United Team of Germany | 3 |
