= Wrestling at the 1968 Summer Olympics – Men's Greco-Roman 87 kg =

Wrestling at the Olympics

Men's Greco-Roman 87 kg at the Games of the XIX Olympiad
- Venue: Insurgentes Ice Rink
- Dates: 23–26 October 1968
- Competitors: 19 from 19 nations

Medalists
1st place, gold medalist(s)		Lothar Metz	East Germany
2nd place, silver medalist(s)		Valentin Olenik	Soviet Union
3rd place, bronze medalist(s)		Branislav Simić	Yugoslavia

The Men's Greco-Roman Middleweight at the 1968 Summer Olympics as part of the wrestling program were held at the Insurgentes Ice Rink. The weight class allowed wrestlers of up to 87 kilograms to compete.

== Results ==
The following wrestlers took part in the event:

Rank	Name	Country
1	Lothar Metz	East Germany
2	Valentin Olenik	Soviet Union
3	Branislav Simić	Yugoslavia
4	Nicolae Neguţ	Romania
5	Wayne Baughman	United States
6	Petar Krumov	Bulgaria
AC	Håkon Øverby	Norway
AC	Czesław Kwieciński	Poland
AC	Tevfik Kış	Turkey
AC	Teuvo Ojala	Finland
AC	Ernst Knoll	West Germany
AC	Jiří Kormaník	Czechoslovakia
AC	László Sillai	Hungary
AC	Jean-Marie Chardonnens	Switzerland
AC	Julio Graffigna	Argentina
AC	José Manuel Hernández	Guatemala
AC	Kenjiro Hiraki	Japan
AC	Héctor Alvarez	Mexico
AC	Bertil Nyström	Sweden
