= Wrestling at the 1972 Summer Olympics – Men's Greco-Roman 90 kg =

Men's Greco-Roman 90 kg at the Games of the XX Olympiad
- Venue: Messe München
- Dates: 5–10 September 1972
- Competitors: 13 from 13 nations

Medalists
1st place, gold medalist(s)		Valery Rezantsev	Soviet Union
2nd place, silver medalist(s)		Josip Čorak	Yugoslavia
3rd place, bronze medalist(s)		Czesław Kwieciński	Poland

The Men's Greco-Roman 90 kg at the 1972 Summer Olympics as part of the wrestling program at the Fairgrounds, Judo and Wrestling Hall.

== Medalists ==
Gold	Valery Rezantsev; Soviet Union
Silver	Josip Čorak; Yugoslavia
Bronze	Czesław Kwieciński; Poland

== Tournament results ==
The competition used a form of negative points tournament, with negative points given for any result short of a fall. Accumulation of 6 negative points eliminated the wrestler. When only two or three wrestlers remain, a special final round is used to determine the order of the medals.

Legend

- DNA — Did not appear
- TPP — Total penalty points
- MPP — Match penalty points

Penalties

- 0 — Won by Fall, Passivity, Injury and Forfeit
- 0.5 — Won by Technical Superiority
- 1 — Won by Points
- 2 — Draw
- 2.5 — Draw, Passivity
- 3 — Lost by Points
- 3.5 — Lost by Technical Superiority
- 4 — Lost by Fall, Passivity, Injury and Forfeit

=== Round 1 ===
TPP	MPP		Time		MPP	TPP
3	3	Roland Andersson (SWE)		Wayne Baughman (USA)	1	1
0	0	Håkon Øverby (NOR)	7:42	Günter Kowalewski (FRG)	4	4
2	2	Nicolae Neguţ (ROU)		Valery Rezantsev (URS)	2	2
1	1	Kimuchi Tani (JPN)		Jean-Marie Chardonnens (SUI)	3	3
4	4	Barend Kops (NED)	0:00	Josip Čorak (YUG)	0	0
2	2	Lothar Metz (GDR)		Czesław Kwieciński (POL)	2	2
3	3	Stoyan Ivanov (BUL)		József Pércsi (HUN)	1	1

=== Round 2 ===
TPP	MPP		Time		MPP	TPP
7	4	Roland Andersson (SWE)	7:03	Håkon Øverby (NOR)	0	0
5	4	Wayne Baughman (USA)	8:03	Günter Kowalewski (FRG)	0	4
2	0	Nicolae Neguţ (ROU)	0:52	Kimuchi Tani (JPN)	4	5
2	0	Valery Rezantsev (URS)	2:59	Jean-Marie Chardonnens (SUI)	4	7
1	1	Josip Čorak (YUG)		Lothar Metz (GDR)	3	5
3	1	Czesław Kwieciński (POL)		Stoyan Ivanov (BUL)	3	6
1		József Pércsi (HUN)		Bye		
4		Barend Kops (NED)		DNA		

=== Round 3 ===
TPP	MPP		Time		MPP	TPP
1.5	0.5	József Pércsi (HUN)		Wayne Baughman (USA)	3.5	8.5
2	2	Håkon Øverby (NOR)		Nicolae Neguţ (ROU)	2	4
8	4	Günter Kowalewski (FRG)	0:00	Valery Rezantsev (URS)	0	2
5	0	Kimuchi Tani (JPN)	1:58	Lothar Metz (GDR)	4	9
3	2	Josip Čorak (YUG)		Czesław Kwieciński (POL)	2	5

=== Round 4 ===
TPP	MPP		Time		MPP	TPP
2.5	1	József Pércsi (HUN)		Håkon Øverby (NOR)	3	5
8	4	Nicolae Neguţ (ROU)	7:36	Josip Čorak (YUG)	0	3
2	0	Valery Rezantsev (URS)	1:24	Kimuchi Tani (JPN)	4	9
5		Czesław Kwieciński (POL)		Bye		

=== Round 5 ===
TPP	MPP		Time		MPP	TPP
5	0	Czesław Kwieciński (POL)	2:04	József Pércsi (HUN)	4	6.5
9	4	Håkon Øverby (NOR)	1:39	Valery Rezantsev (URS)	0	2
3		Josip Čorak (YUG)		Bye		

=== Final ===
Results from the preliminary round are carried forward into the final (shown in yellow).

TPP	MPP		Time		MPP	TPP
	2	Josip Čorak (YUG)		Czesław Kwieciński (POL)	2	
5	3	Josip Čorak (YUG)		Valery Rezantsev (URS)	1	
5	3	Czesław Kwieciński (POL)		Valery Rezantsev (URS)	1	2

== Final standings ==
1. Valery Rezantsev (URS)
2. Josip Čorak (YUG)
3. Czesław Kwieciński (POL)
4. József Pércsi (HUN)
5. Håkon Øverby (NOR)
6. Nicolae Neguţ (ROU)
