= Wrestling at the 1960 Summer Olympics – Men's Greco-Roman light heavyweight =

Wrestling at the Olympics

Men's Greco-Roman light heavyweight at the Games of the XVII Olympiad
- Venue: Basilica of Maxentius
- Dates: 26–31 August 1960
- Competitors: 17 from 17 nations

Medalists
1st place, gold medalist(s)		Tevfik Kış	Turkey
2nd place, silver medalist(s)		Krali Bimbalov	Bulgaria
3rd place, bronze medalist(s)		Givi Kartozia	Soviet Union

The men's Greco-Roman light heavyweight competition at the 1960 Summer Olympics in Rome took place from 26 to 31 August at the Basilica of Maxentius. Nations were limited to one competitor. Light heavyweight was the second-heaviest category, including wrestlers weighing 79 to 87 kilograms (174.2 to 191.8 lb).

== Competition format ==
This Greco-Roman wrestling competition continued to use the "bad points" elimination system introduced at the 1928 Summer Olympics for Greco-Roman and at the 1932 Summer Olympics for freestyle wrestling, though adjusted the point values slightly. Wins by fall continued to be worth 0 points and wins by decision continued to be worth 1 point. Losses by fall, however, were now worth 4 points (up from 3). Losses by decision were worth 3 points (consistent with most prior years, though in some losses by split decision had been worth only 2 points). Ties were now allowed, worth 2 points for each wrestler. The elimination threshold was also increased from 5 points to 6 points. The medal round concept, used in 1952 and 1956 requiring a round-robin amongst the medalists even if one or more finished a round with enough points for elimination, was used only if exactly three wrestlers remained after a round—if two competitors remained, they faced off head-to-head; if only one, he was the gold medalist.

== Results ==
=== Round 1 ===
Jansson and Graffigna withdrew after their bouts.

Bouts

Winner	Nation	Victory Type	Loser	Nation
Givi Kartozia	Soviet Union	Decision	Howard George	United States
Herbert Albrecht	United Team of Germany	Decision	Rune Jansson	Sweden
Gheorghe Popovici	Romania	Fall	Shunta Ishikura	Japan
Eugen Wiesberger Jr.	Austria	Decision	Maurice Jacquel	France
Krali Bimbalov	Bulgaria	Decision	Włodzimierz Smoliński	Poland
Tevfik Kış	Turkey	Decision	Kurt Rusterholz	Switzerland
Péter Piti	Hungary	Decision	Antonio Cerroni	Italy
José Panizo	Spain	Fall	Julio Graffigna	Argentina
Antero Vanhanen	Finland	Bye	N/A	N/A

Points

Rank	Wrestler	Nation	Start	Earned	Total
1	José Panizo	Spain	0	0	0
1	Gheorghe Popovici	Romania	0	0	0
1	Antero Vanhanen	Finland	0	0	0
4	Herbert Albrecht	United Team of Germany	0	1	1
4	Krali Bimbalov	Bulgaria	0	1	1
4	Givi Kartozia	Soviet Union	0	1	1
4	Tevfik Kış	Turkey	0	1	1
4	Péter Piti	Hungary	0	1	1
4	Eugen Wiesberger Jr.	Austria	0	1	1
10	Antonio Cerroni	Italy	0	3	3
10	Howard George	United States	0	3	3
10	Maurice Jacquel	France	0	3	3
10	Kurt Rusterholz	Switzerland	0	3	3
10	Włodzimierz Smoliński	Poland	0	3	3
15	Shunta Ishikura	Japan	0	4	4
16	Rune Jansson	Sweden	0	3	3*
17	Julio Graffigna	Argentina	0	4	4*

=== Round 2 ===
Bouts

Winner	Nation	Victory Type	Loser	Nation
Givi Kartozia	Soviet Union	Decision	Antero Vanhanen	Finland
Herbert Albrecht	United Team of Germany	Decision	Howard George	United States
Eugen Wiesberger Jr.	Austria	Decision	Shunta Ishikura	Japan
Maurice Jacquel	France	Fall	Gheorghe Popovici	Romania
Krali Bimbalov	Bulgaria	Tie	Tevfik Kış	Turkey
Włodzimierz Smoliński	Poland	Decision	Antonio Cerroni	Italy
Péter Piti	Hungary	Decision	Kurt Rusterholz	Switzerland
José Panizo	Spain	Bye	N/A	N/A

Points

Rank	Wrestler	Nation	Start	Earned	Total
1	José Panizo	Spain	0	0	0
2	Herbert Albrecht	United Team of Germany	1	1	2
2	Givi Kartozia	Soviet Union	1	1	2
2	Péter Piti	Hungary	1	1	2
2	Eugen Wiesberger Jr.	Austria	1	1	2
6	Krali Bimbalov	Bulgaria	1	2	3
6	Maurice Jacquel	France	3	0	3
6	Tevfik Kış	Turkey	1	2	3
6	Antero Vanhanen	Finland	0	3	3
10	Gheorghe Popovici	Romania	0	4	4
10	Włodzimierz Smoliński	Poland	3	1	4
12	Antonio Cerroni	Italy	3	3	6
12	Howard George	United States	3	3	6
12	Kurt Rusterholz	Switzerland	3	3	6
15	Shunta Ishikura	Japan	4	3	7

=== Round 3 ===
Bouts

Winner	Nation	Victory Type	Loser	Nation
Antero Vanhanen	Finland	Decision	José Panizo	Spain
Givi Kartozia	Soviet Union	Decision	Herbert Albrecht	United Team of Germany
Gheorghe Popovici	Romania	Decision	Eugen Wiesberger Jr.	Austria
Krali Bimbalov	Bulgaria	Decision	Maurice Jacquel	France
Tevfik Kış	Turkey	Decision	Włodzimierz Smoliński	Poland
Péter Piti	Hungary	Bye	N/A	N/A

Points

Rank	Wrestler	Nation	Start	Earned	Total
1	Péter Piti	Hungary	2	0	2
2	Givi Kartozia	Soviet Union	2	1	3
2	José Panizo	Spain	0	3	3
4	Krali Bimbalov	Bulgaria	3	1	4
4	Tevfik Kış	Turkey	3	1	4
4	Antero Vanhanen	Finland	3	1	4
7	Herbert Albrecht	United Team of Germany	2	3	5
7	Gheorghe Popovici	Romania	4	1	5
7	Eugen Wiesberger Jr.	Austria	2	3	5
10	Maurice Jacquel	France	3	3	6
11	Włodzimierz Smoliński	Poland	4	3	7

=== Round 4 ===
The tie between Wiesberger and Popovici was broken by head-to-head results; Popovici won in round 3.

Bouts

Winner	Nation	Victory Type	Loser	Nation
Péter Piti	Hungary	Fall	José Panizo	Spain
Antero Vanhanen	Finland	Fall	Herbert Albrecht	United Team of Germany
Givi Kartozia	Soviet Union	Decision	Gheorghe Popovici	Romania
Krali Bimbalov	Bulgaria	Decision	Eugen Wiesberger Jr.	Austria
Tevfik Kış	Turkey	Bye	N/A	N/A

Points

Rank	Wrestler	Nation	Start	Earned	Total
1	Péter Piti	Hungary	2	0	2
2	Givi Kartozia	Soviet Union	3	1	4
2	Tevfik Kış	Turkey	4	0	4
2	Antero Vanhanen	Finland	4	0	4
5	Krali Bimbalov	Bulgaria	4	1	5
6	José Panizo	Spain	3	4	7
7	Gheorghe Popovici	Romania	5	3	8
8	Eugen Wiesberger Jr.	Austria	5	3	8
9	Herbert Albrecht	United Team of Germany	5	4	9

=== Round 5 ===
Bouts

Winner	Nation	Victory Type	Loser	Nation
Tevfik Kış	Turkey	Decision	Antero Vanhanen	Finland
Givi Kartozia	Soviet Union	Decision	Péter Piti	Hungary
Krali Bimbalov	Bulgaria	Bye	N/A	N/A

Points

Rank	Wrestler	Nation	Start	Earned	Total
1	Krali Bimbalov	Bulgaria	5	0	5
1	Givi Kartozia	Soviet Union	4	1	5
1	Tevfik Kış	Turkey	4	1	5
1	Péter Piti	Hungary	2	3	5
5	Antero Vanhanen	Finland	4	3	7

=== Round 6 ===
The sixth round ended with all four wrestlers having at least 6 points; there were two ties, a tie for first place and a tie for third place. Kış and Bimbalov tied for first. They had faced each other in round 2, with the bout ending in a tie. The decision was ultimately based on body weight, with Kış (the lighter wrestler) prevailing and taking the gold medal. Kartozia took the bronze medal over Piti due to head-to-head results; Kartozia had won in round 5.

Bouts

Winner	Nation	Victory Type	Loser	Nation
Krali Bimbalov	Bulgaria	Decision	Péter Piti	Hungary
Tevfik Kış	Turkey	Decision	Givi Kartozia	Soviet Union

Points

Rank	Wrestler	Nation	Start	Earned	Total
1st place, gold medalist(s)	Tevfik Kış	Turkey	5	1	6
2nd place, silver medalist(s)	Krali Bimbalov	Bulgaria	5	1	6
3rd place, bronze medalist(s)	Givi Kartozia	Soviet Union	5	3	8
4	Péter Piti	Hungary	5	3	8
