= Geib =

Geib is a surname. Notable people with the surname include:

- Karl-Hermann Geib (1908–1949), German physical chemist
- Robert Geib (1911–1996), Luxembourgian footballer
- Theodor Geib (1885–1944), German military officer
- Tori Geib (1986–2021), American chef and cancer patient advocate
