= Panizo =

Panizo is a surname. Notable people with the surname include:

- Arnaldo Panizo (1839–1892), Peruvian general
- Daniel Calvo Panizo (born 1979), Spanish footballer
- Gregolry Panizo (born 1985), Brazilian road bicycle racer
- José Luis Panizo (1922–1990), Spanish footballer
- José Panizo (wrestler) (born 1936), Spanish wrestler
- Juliana Panizo Rodríguez (1947–2024), Spanish academic
