= Eugen Wiesberger =

Eugen Wiesberger can refer to:

- Eugen Wiesberger Sr. (born 1900), Austrian Olympic wrestler
- Eugen Wiesberger Jr. (1933-1996), Austrian Olympic wrestler, son of the above
