= Héctor Álvarez =

Héctor Álvarez may refer to:

- Héctor Álvarez Álvarez (1882–1960), Chilean teacher and politician
- Héctor Álvarez (golfer), Mexican golfer, competed in 1963 Canada Cup et al.
- Héctor Álvarez Martínez (born 2006), Spanish cyclist
- Héctor Álvarez (wrestler) (born 1946), Mexican Olympic wrestler
- H. A. Murena (Héctor Álvarez Murena, 1923–1975), Argentine writer and poet
