= Vanhanen =

Vanhanen is a Finnish surname. Notable people with the surname include:

- Antero Vanhanen (1935–1986), Finnish wrestler
- Ella Vanhanen (born 1993), Finnish football player
- Erkki Vanhanen (1940–2024), Finnish journalist and sportscaster
- Marko Vanhanen (born 1968), Finnish YouTuber and inventor
- Matti Vanhanen (born 1955), Finnish politician
- Reetta Vanhanen (born 1990), Finnish politician
- Sanni Vanhanen (born 2005), Finnish hockey player
- Tatu Vanhanen (1929–2015), Finnish political scientist and author
