= Columbus State =

Columbus State may refer to:

- Columbus State Community College, a community college in Columbus, Ohio
- Columbus State University, a state university in Columbus, Georgia
