= Antonio Cerroni =

Italian wrestler (1924–2020)

Personal information
- Nationality: Italian
- Born: 12 August 1924 Rome, Italy
- Died: 24 March 2020 (aged 95)

Sport
- Sport: Wrestling

Antonio Cerroni (12 August 1924 – 24 March 2020) was an Italian wrestler. He competed in the men's Greco-Roman light heavyweight at the 1960 Summer Olympics.
