= Yavuz Selekman =

Turkish wrestler (1937–2004)

Personal information
- Nationality: Turkish
- Born: 15 February 1937
- Died: 8 March 2004 (aged 67)

Sport
- Sport: Wrestling

Yavuz Selekman (15 February 1937 – 8 March 2004) was a Turkish amateur wrestler, professional wrestler and film actor He competed in the men's Greco-Roman middleweight at the 1964 Summer Olympics.

== Filmography ==
=== Film actor and director ===
- Altın Kafes (1958)
- iftıra (1958)
- Dokuz Dağın Efesi: Çakıcı Geliyor (1958)
- Bu Vatanın Çocukları (1959)
- Ölmeyen Aşk (1959)
- Kalpaklılar (1959)
- Düşman Yolları Kesti (1959)
- Alageyik (1959)
- Yalnızlar Rıhtımı (1959)
- Kırık Plak (1959)
- Gurbet (1959)
- Taş Bebek (1960)
- Yılanların Öcü (1961)
- Yaman Gazeteci (1961)
- Fatoş'un Bebekleri (1962)
- Barut Fıçısı (1963)
- On Korkusuz Adam (1964)
- Turist Ömer (1964)
- Keşanlı Ali Destanı (1964)
- Fıstık Gibi Maşallah (1964)
- Tophaneli Osman (1964)
- Hıçkırık (1965)
- Hüseyin Baradan Çekilin Aradan (1965)
- Serseri Aşık (1965)
- Karaoğlan Altay'dan Gelen Yiğit (1965)
- Karaoğlan Baybora'nın Oğlu (1966)
- Karaoğlan Camoka'nın İntikamı (1966)
- Siyah Gül (1966)
- Sokak Kızı (1966)
- Damgalı Kadın (1966)
- Bir Millet Uyanıyor (1966)
- Fakir Bir Kız Sevdim (1966)
- Senede Bir Gün (1966)
- Ölmeyen Aşk (1966)
- Çalıkuşu (1966)
- Turist Ömer Almanya'da (1966)
- Karaoğlan Bizanslı Zorba (1967)
- Yara (1968)
- Tarkan (1969)
- Casus Kıran Yedi Canlı Adam (1970)
- Mıstık (1971)
- Senede Bir Gün (1971)
- Zulüm (1972)
- Zorbanın Aşkı (1972)
- 3 Dev Adam (1973)
- Erkekler Ağlamaz (1974)
- Şabaniye (1984)
- A Ay (1988)
- Ana Kuzusu (1997)
