= Max Kobelt =

Swiss wrestler

Personal information
- Nationality: Swiss
- Born: 5 January 1941 (age 85)

Sport
- Sport: Wrestling

Max Kobelt (born 5 January 1941) is a Swiss wrestler. He competed in the men's Greco-Roman middleweight at the 1964 Summer Olympics.
