= Shunta Ishikura =

Japanese wrestler

Personal information
- Nationality: Japanese
- Born: 7 January 1937 (age 89) Toyama, Japan

Sport
- Sport: Wrestling

Shunta Ishikura (born 7 January 1937) is a Japanese wrestler. He competed in the men's Greco-Roman light heavyweight at the 1960 Summer Olympics.
