= László Sillai =

Hungarian wrestler

Personal information
- Nationality: Hungarian
- Born: 2 June 1943 Darnózseli, Hungary
- Died: 15 June 2007 (aged 64) Győrzámoly, Hungary

Sport
- Sport: Wrestling

László Sillai (2 June 1943 – 15 June 2007) was a Hungarian wrestler. He competed in the men's Greco-Roman 87 kg at the 1968 Summer Olympics.
