= Włodzimierz Smoliński =

Polish wrestler

Personal information
- Nationality: Polish
- Born: 3 January 1938 Chrostowo, Poland
- Died: 12 April 2018 (aged 80)

Sport
- Sport: Wrestling

Włodzimierz Smoliński (3 January 1938 – 12 April 2018) was a Polish wrestler. He competed in the men's Greco-Roman light heavyweight at the 1960 Summer Olympics.
