= Stig Persson =

Swedish wrestler

Personal information
- Nationality: Swedish
- Born: 28 November 1934 Klippan, Sweden
- Died: 1 July 1968 (aged 33) Nybro, Sweden

Sport
- Sport: Wrestling

Stig Persson (28 November 1934 – 1 July 1968) was a Swedish wrestler. He competed in the men's Greco-Roman middleweight at the 1964 Summer Olympics.
