= Péter Piti =

Hungarian wrestler

Personal information
- Nationality: Hungarian
- Born: 4 June 1935 Szentes, Hungary
- Died: 31 January 1978 (aged 42) Budapest, Hungary

Sport
- Sport: Wrestling

Péter Piti (4 June 1935 – 31 January 1978) was a Hungarian wrestler. He competed in the men's Greco-Roman light heavyweight category at the 1960 Summer Olympics.
