= Howard George =

American wrestler (1935–2010)

Personal information
- Born: February 6, 1935 Watertown, New York, U.S.
- Died: February 24, 2010 (aged 75) Syracuse, New York, U.S.

Sport
- Country: United States
- Sport: Wrestling
- Event: Greco-Roman
- Club: U.S. Marine Corps
- Team: USA

Howard George (February 6, 1935 – February 24, 2010) was an American wrestler. He competed in the men's Greco-Roman light heavyweight at the 1960 Summer Olympics.
