= Josip Čorak =

Croatian wrestler (1943–2023)

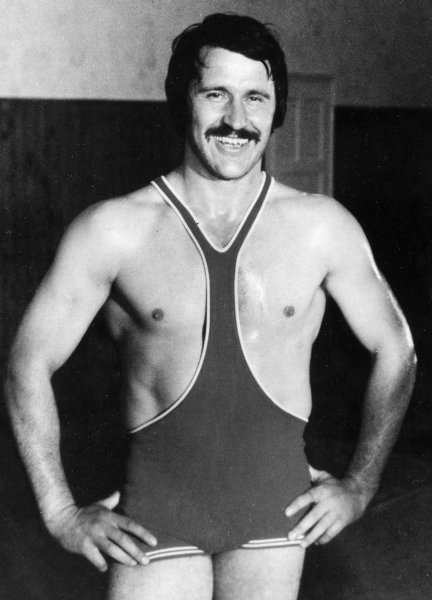
- Čorak circa 1972

Personal information
- Born: 14 June 1943 Rastoka, Independent State of Croatia
- Died: 28 November 2023 (aged 80)
- Height: 189 cm (6 ft 2 in)

Sport
- Sport: Greco-Roman wrestling
- Club: HK Lika, Zagreb
- Coached by: Josip Maric; Ljubomir Ivanović
Medal record
Representing Yugoslavia
Olympic Games
Silver medal – second place	1972 Munich	90 kg
European championships
Gold medal – first place	1969 Modena	90 kg
Bronze medal – third place	1970 Berlin	90 kg
Mediterranean Games
Silver medal – second place	1967 Tunis	97 kg
Gold medal – first place	1971 İzmir	90 kg

Josip Čorak (14 June 1943 – 28 November 2023) was a Croatian wrestler. Competing as a senior in the 90 kg Greco-Roman division he won gold medals at the 1969 European Championships and 1967 Mediterranean Games and a silver medal at the 1972 Olympics. Čorak later won a record 11 world titles in Greco-Roman and freestyle wrestling in the masters category. Čorak died on 28 November 2023, at the age of 80.
