= Lee Gi-yeol =

South Korean wrestler

Personal information
- Native name: 이•기열
- Nationality: South Korea
- Born: 29 February 1940 (age 86)

Sport
- Sport: Wrestling
- Event: 1964 Summer Olympics

Lee Gi-yeol (Korean: 이•기열; born 29 February 1940) is a South Korean wrestler. He competed in the men's Greco-Roman middleweight at the 1964 Summer Olympics.
