= Branislav Simić =

Serbian Greco-Roman wrestler

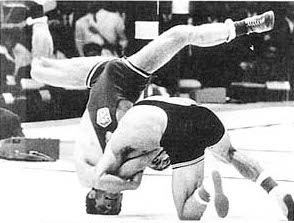
- Simić (right) vs. Jiří Kormaník at the 1964 Olympics

Personal information
- Born: 21 March 1935 (age 91) Gornja Rogatica, Yugoslavia
- Height: 1.80 m (5 ft 11 in)
- Weight: 88 kg (194 lb)

Sport
- Sport: Greco-Roman wrestling
- Club: RK Proleter, Zrenjanin
Medal record
Representing Yugoslavia
Olympic Games
| Gold medal – first place | 1964 Tokyo | 87 kg |
| Bronze medal – third place | 1968 Mexico City | 87 kg |
World Championships
| Silver medal – second place | 1963 Helsingborg | 87 kg |
World Cup
| Silver medal – second place | 1956 Istanbul | 79 kg |
Mediterranean Games
| Gold medal – first place | 1967 Tunis | 87 kg |

Branislav Simić (Serbian Cyrillic: Бранислав Симић; born 21 March 1935) is a retired Greco-Roman wrestler from Serbia. He competed at the 1956, 1964 and 1968 Olympics in the middleweight category (−87 kg), and won a gold medal in 1964 and a bronze in 1968.

Olympic Games
| Preceded by Miroslav Cerar | Flagbearer for Yugoslavia; 1968 Mexico City | Succeeded by Mirko Sandić |
