= Herbert Albrecht (wrestler) =

German wrestler (1925–1997)

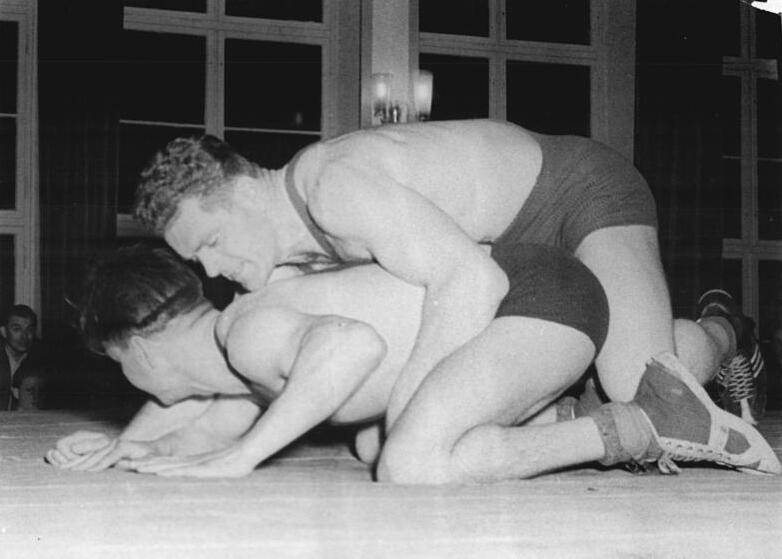
- By defeating Maier in Leipzig Albrecht became SC East German team champion with SC Motor Zella-Mehlis in 1959

Personal information
- Nationality: German
- Born: 18 January 1925 Suhl, Germany
- Died: 3 November 1997 (aged 72) Suhl, Germany

Sport
- Sport: Wrestling

Herbert Albrecht (18 January 1925 – 3 November 1997) was a German wrestler. He competed in the men's Greco-Roman light heavyweight at the 1960 Summer Olympics.

== Personal life ==
Albrecht served in the Wehrmacht during the Second World War.
