= 3 Dev Adam =

1973 Turkish film

- Theatrical poster
- Directed by: T. Fikret Uçak
- Written by: Doğan Tamer
- Based on: Captain America by; Jack Kirby; Joe Simon; Spider-Man by; Stan Lee; Steve Ditko; El Santo by Rodolfo Guzmán Huerta
- Produced by: Hasan Tual
- Starring: Aytekin Akkaya; Deniz Erkanat; Yavuz Selekman; Tevfik Şen; Doğan Tamer; Mine Sun
- Cinematography: Orhan Kapkı
- Edited by: Hüsamettin Üren
- Production companies: Tual Film; Arsel
- Distributed by: RENKLİ
- Release date: November 1, 1973
- Running time: 81 minutes
- Country: Turkey
- Language: Turkish

3 Dev Adam (Üç Dev Adam, translated as 3 Giant Men, which is sometimes referred to as Captain America And Santo Vs. Spider-Man and which is also sometimes referred to as Turkish Spider-Man) is a 1973 Turkish superhero film directed by T. Fikret Uçak and written by Doğan Tamer, based on characters created by Steve Ditko, Jack Kirby, Stan Lee, Joe Simon and Rodolfo Guzmán Huerta, featuring Aytekin Akkaya as Captain America and Yavuz Selekman as El Santo. Captain America and El Santo are called to Istanbul on a special mission to stop the villainous Spider-Man and the rest of his vicious heinous criminal gang.

The Turksploitation film, which went on nationwide general release across the country on November 1, 1973, was completely unauthorized by the copyright owners of the dubiously depicted characters. The film was popular and thus spawned many other mockbuster types of many other similar major Hollywood productions.

== Plot ==
The story unfolds in Istanbul with a violent criminal organization led by Spider-Man, a former professional wrestler turned into a supervillain, lashing out in the city by flooding it with counterfeit money. In a horrifying act, members of Spider-Man's organization mutilate a woman's face by using a boat propeller. In response to the crisis, a small task force, comprising Captain America, El Santo, and Captain America's girlfriend and sidekick Julia, come forth to assist the local police in apprehending Spider-Man and the rest of his dastardly outfit of criminal outlaws.

Julia, who successfully infiltrates Spider-Man's hideout, gets captured and transported to a remote location. Despite the perilous situation, she manages to send an SOS signal to Captain America. Captain America rescues Julia, but Spider-Man eludes capture. Simultaneously, Mexico's national professional wrestler and superhero, El Santo, infiltrates the counterfeit operation that doubles as a dojo. After being captured briefly, Santo escapes with some very important incriminating evidence.

Captain America and El Santo embark on a mission to raid the hideout central to the counterfeiting operation, successfully shutting it down. However, Spider-Man seizes the opportunity to commit further crimes, such as killing some people and stealing statues, prompting him to plan to flee because of the inclusion of the criminal actions. Subsequently, the initial confrontation between the heroes and Spider-Man unfolds, revealing the ability of Spider-Man to spawn duplicates of himself spontaneously.

In an attempt to apprehend Spider-Man, Captain America and Santo go undercover in a nightclub, leading to a fierce confrontation with Spider-Man's gang. Appearing to be overwhelmed, the heroes deliberately get themselves captured and taken to Spider-Man's hideout. Captain America and Santo feign infighting, confusing their captors and enabling their escape. They eliminate most of the gang members during a brief impromptu brawl, but then Spider-Man arrives with his girlfriend and sidekick Nadya.

During the ensuing chaos, Nadya is accidentally struck by a stray bullet from a gang member's gun and gets fatally wounded. Spider-Man flees with Captain America in intense direct pursuit. After a grueling battle, Captain America seemingly defeats Spider-Man, but only to be confronted by another Spider-Man and another Spider-Man to yet another Spider-Man and to even yet another Spider-Man. The predicament intensifies into an extreme gauntlet until each Spider-Man is ultimately defeated.

As the protagonists prepare to depart Istanbul, Captain America, driven by suspicion, notices a figure resembling Spider-Man sitting in the back of a taxi. Reacting impulsively, he runs to the taxi, then reaches inside, pulls the person's head by their mask through the window and unmasks him. But only to his dismay, he surprisingly discovers that it is just a very young boy wearing an ominous Spider-Man professional wrestling mask.

== Cast ==
- Yavuz Selekman as El Santo. The primary difference between this version of El Santo and the original version of El Santo is that the character in the film wears his mask just only during certain situations as opposed to the original Santo never blatantly being seen out in the open with his true identity revealed when he didn't wear his mask. He is referred to mostly as "El Santo" during the film and he is also referred to just only one time as "Santo". He speaks a little bit of English during the film, but mostly he speaks Turkish. This version of El Santo is depicted in the film as him being a superhero and also as him being a professional wrestler. His signature costume that he wears during the film resembles mostly the original traditional professional wrestling attire that the original professional wrestler El Santo was very well known for wearing during professional wrestling matches since he became known as El Santo. Santo was very famous during the 1940s, the 1950s, the 1960s, and the 1970s and he was also very well known in Turkey.
- Aytekin Akkaya as Captain America. He doesn't have his shield and his mask lacks the wings by his ears, but his entire signature costume is bulletproof. He is shown with only one superpower during the film, which is telepathy, but he just uses this ability only two times. He speaks a little bit of Spanish and a little bit of Mandarin during the film, but mostly he speaks Turkish. He is referred to only as "Captain America" during the film. He is called "Yüzbaşı Amerika" in Turkish during the film, which is meaning "Captain America" in English. This version of Captain America is depicted in the film as him being a superhero and also as him being a professional wrestler. His signature costume that he wears during the film resembles mostly the original traditional professional wrestling attire that the original professional wrestler Captain America was very well known for wearing during professional wrestling matches since he became known as Captain America.
- Tevfik Şen as Spider-Man. He is depicted in the film as him being a supervillain with none of his abilities from the comics aside from him climbing buildings and having fighting skills. He paints part of his face white and he has strands of hair sticking out of the eye holes in his mask that resemble long eyebrows. He has only two superpowers during the film. One of his only superpowers during the film is the ability to come back unharmed from death and other dismay multiple times and as well as spontaneous body duplicating in what is all that is perceived as him making clones of himself. His only other superpower during the film is to make himself look like other adult males even if they are even bigger than him in what is very similar to the way that is done by the masked vigilante known as Kilink. He speaks a little bit of Spanish and a little bit of English during the film, but mostly he speaks Turkish. He is referred to mostly as "Spider" during the film and he is also referred to just only two times as "Spider-Man". He is called "Örümce" and "Örümcek" in Turkish during the film, which are both meaning "Spider" in English and he is also called "Örümce-Adam" and "Örümcek-Adam" in Turkish during the film, which are both meaning "Spider-Man" in English. This version of Spider-Man is also depicted in the film as him formerly being a professional wrestler. His signature costume that he wears during the film resembles very little of the original traditional professional wrestling attire that the original professional wrestler Spider-Man was very well known for wearing during professional wrestling matches since he became known as Spider-Man.
- Doğan Tamer as Inspector Orhan.
- Ali Ekdal as Police Commissioner.
- Deniz Erkanat as Julia, Captain America's girlfriend and superheroine sidekick. She speaks a little bit of English during the film, but mostly she speaks Turkish.
- Mine Sun as Nadya, Spider-Man's girlfriend and supervillainess sidekick.
- Altan Günbay as Cemil, Nightclub Manager and one of Spider-Man's gang members.
- Ersun Kazançel as Nightclub Bartender.
- Osman Han as Nightclub Bouncer and one of Spider-Man's gang members.
- İhsan Baysal as Nightclub Bouncer and one of Spider-Man's gang members.
- Nilgün Ceylan as Doris Wilgus.
- Mehmet Yağmur as Bekir, one of Spider-Man's gang members.
