= Istvan Raskovy =

Australian wrestler (1936–2021)

Personal information
- Full name: Stephen Istvan Raskovy
- Nationality: Australian
- Born: 25 November 1936
- Died: 31 May 2021 (aged 84)

Sport
- Sport: Wrestling

Istvan Raskovy OAM (25 November 1936 – 31 May 2021) was an Australian wrestler. He competed in the men's Greco-Roman middleweight at the 1964 Summer Olympics. In the 1986 Queen's Birthday Honours, Roskovy was awarded the Medal of the Order of Australia (OAM) for "service to wrestling".
