= Håkon Øverby =

Norwegian wrestler (1941–2021)

Håkon Øverby (5 December 1941 – 10 November 2021) was a Norwegian sport wrestler.

Øverby was born in Oslo, and represented the sports club SK av 1909. He participated in the 87 kg weight class (middleweight) in wrestling at the 1968 Summer Olympics, where he exited after the fourth round. He then finished fifth at the 1968 European Wrestling Championships and fifth at the 1969 World Wrestling Championships. He then participated in the 90 kg weight class (light-heavyweight) in wrestling at the 1972 Summer Olympics, where he finished fifth overall. He took eleven national championships (eight in light heavyweight) between 1963 and 1976.
