= Roy O'Donnell =

Australian rules footballer, born 1907

Personal information
- Full name: Vincent Roy O'Donnell
- Born: 12 November 1907; Carlton, Victoria
- Died: 5 May 1996 (aged 88)

Playing career^{1}
Years	Club	Games (Goals)
1930	Footscray	7 (0)
- ^{1} Playing statistics correct to the end of 1930.

Roy O'Donnell (12 November 1907 – 5 May 1996) was a former Australian rules footballer who played with Footscray in the Victorian Football League (VFL).
