= Lothar Metz =

German wrestler (1939–2021)

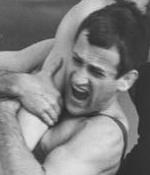
- Metz was the 1968 Olympic Greco-Roman middleweight champion

Medal record

Men's Greco-Roman wrestling

Olympic Games

Representing Germany
Silver medal – second place	1960 Rome	Middleweight
Bronze medal – third place	1964 Tokyo	Middleweight

Representing East Germany
Gold medal – first place	1968 Mexico City	Middleweight

Lothar Metz (Germany, 16 January 1939 – Germany, 23 January 2021) was a German wrestler.

== Career ==
He won an Olympic silver medal in Greco-Roman wrestling in 1960, and a bronze medal in 1964. He won an Olympic gold medal in 1968, competing for East Germany.
