= Els van den Horn =

Dutch diver (1927–1996)

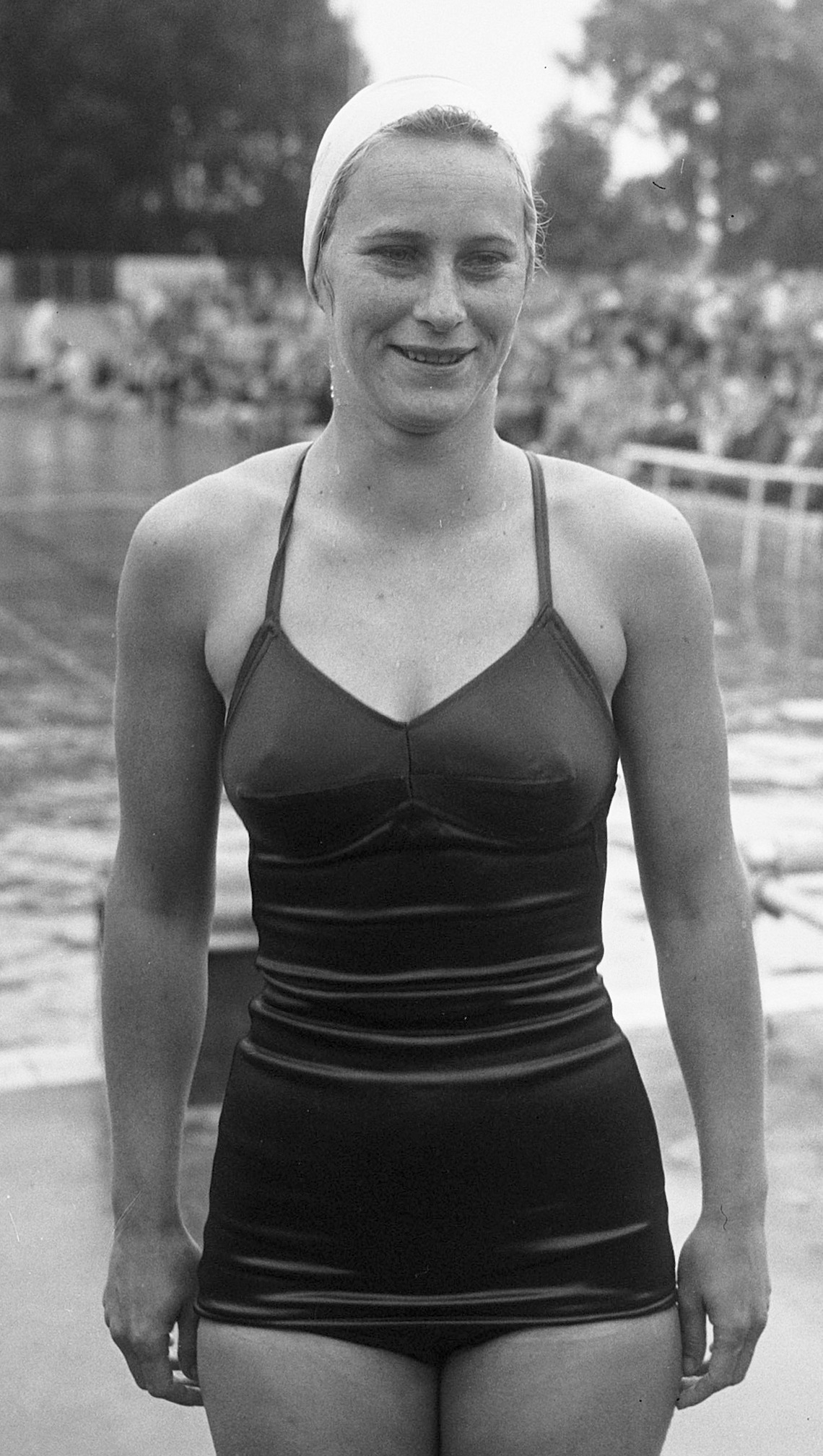
- Els van den Horn in 1952

Personal information
- Born: 19 May 1927 Yogyakarta, Dutch East Indies
- Died: 27 May 1996 (aged 69) Gouda, the Netherlands

Sport
- Sport: Diving
- Club: Het Y, Amsterdam

Hendrina Elizabet "Els" van den Horn (later van Breda, 19 May 1927 – 27 May 1996) was a Dutch diver. She competed at the 1952 Summer Olympics in the 3 m springboard and finished in 12th place.
