= Günter Kowalewski =

German wrestler

Günter Kowalewski (born 31 October 1943) is a German former wrestler who competed in the 1972 Summer Olympics. He was born in Dortmund.
