= Krali Bimbalov =

Bulgarian Greco-Roman wrestler

Medal record

Men's Greco-Roman wrestling

Representing Bulgaria

Olympic Games
Silver medal – second place	1960 Rome	Light-heavyweight

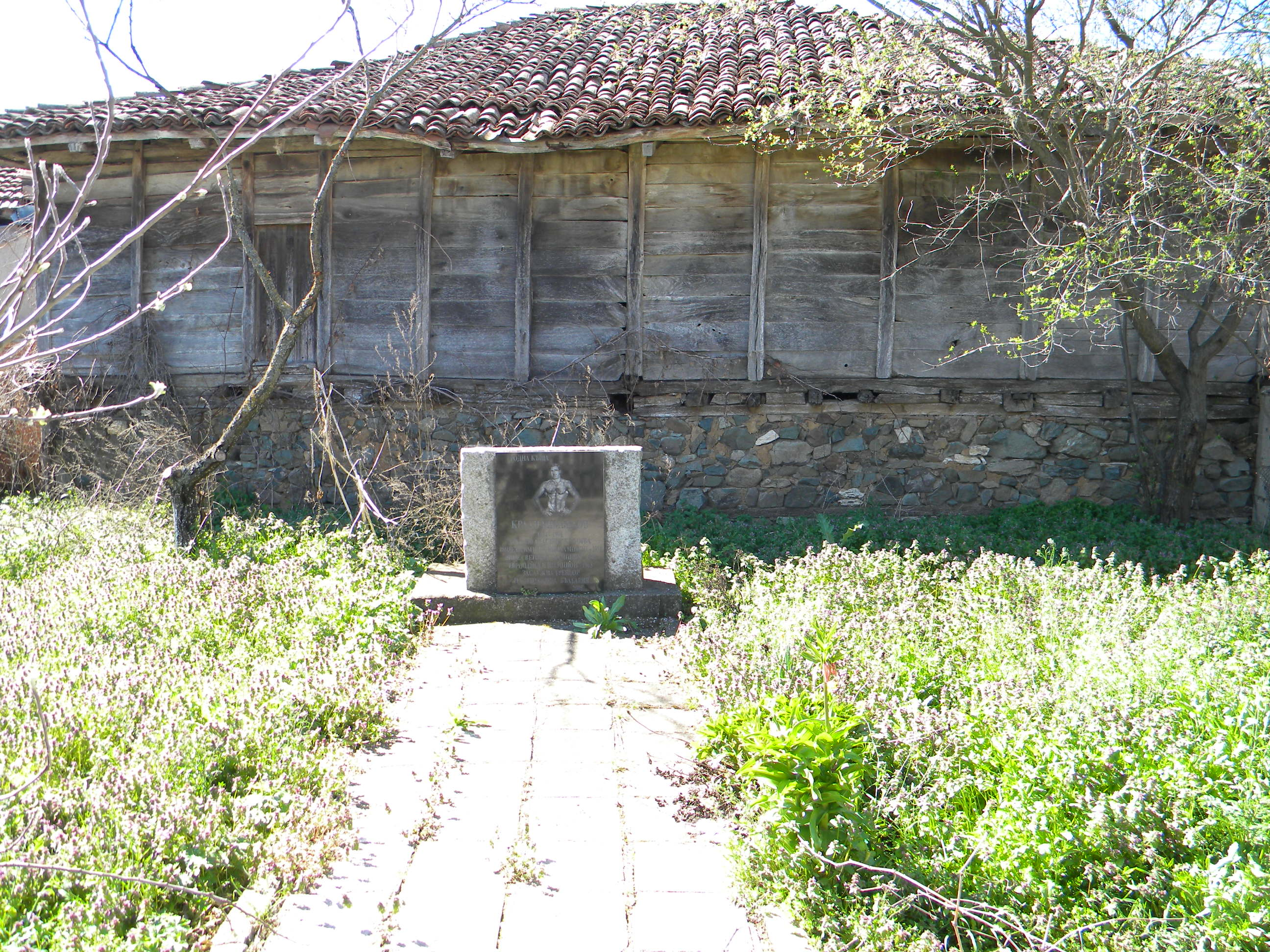
monument to K. Bimbalov

Krali Bimbalov (Bulgarian: Крали Бимбалов) (1 November 1934 – 1988) was a Bulgarian wrestler who competed in the 1960 Summer Olympics and in the 1964 Summer Olympics.
