= Jiří Kormaník =

Czech amateur wrestler (1935–2017)

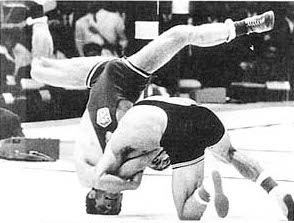
- Kormaník (left) vs. Simić at the 1968 Olympics

Personal information
- Born: 26 March 1935 Scăiuş, Romania
- Died: 3 November 2017 (aged 82) Chomutov, Czech Republic
- Height: 1.78 m (5 ft 10 in)
- Weight: 79 kg (174 lb)

Sport
- Sport: Greco-Roman wrestling
Medal record
Representing Czechoslovakia
Olympic Games
| Silver medal – second place | 1964 Tokyo | Middleweight |
World championships
| Bronze medal – third place | 1965 Manchester | 87 kg |
European championships
| Bronze medal – third place | 1968 | 87 kg |

Jiří Kormaník (26 March 1935 – 3 November 2017) was a Czech amateur wrestler. Born in Romania, he competed for Czechoslovakia at the 1960, 1964 and 1968 Olympics in Greco-Roman wrestling and won a silver medal in 1964.
