= Maurice Jacquel =

French wrestler

Personal information
- Nationality: French
- Born: 14 March 1929; Plainfaing, France
- Died: 10 April 2004 (aged 75); Colmar, France

Sport
- Sport: Wrestling

Maurice Jacquel (14 March 1929 – 10 April 2004) was a French wrestler. He competed in two events at the 1960 Summer Olympics.
