= Don Kerley =

Australian rules footballer, born 1917

Personal information
- Full name: Don Kerley
- Born: 10 March 1917
- Died: 31 May 1996 (aged 79)
- Original team: Prahran
- Height: 184 cm (6 ft 0 in)
- Weight: 78 kg (172 lb)

Playing career^{1}
Years	Club	Games (Goals)
1943–44	St Kilda	5 (0)
- ^{1} Playing statistics correct to the end of 1944.

Don Kerley (10 March 1917 – 31 May 1996) was an Australian rules footballer who played with St Kilda in the Victorian Football League (VFL).
