= Kimuchi Tani =

Japanese wrestler

Kimuchi Tani (谷 公市, Tani Kimuchi, 28 September 1948 – 4 January 2008) was a Japanese wrestler who competed in the 1972 Summer Olympics.
