= Roy Cullinan =

Australian rules footballer

Roy Francis Cullinan

Personal information
- Full name: Roy Francis Cullinan
- Born: 23 December 1932 (age 93); Williamstown
- Died: 4 May 1996; Deniliquin
- Original team: Spotswood/Williamstown
- Height: 180 cm (5 ft 11 in)
- Weight: 80 kg (176 lb)
- Position: full forward

Playing career^{1}
Years	Club	Games (Goals)
1953	South Melbourne	2 (0)
- ^{1} Playing statistics correct to the end of 1953.

Roy Cullinan (23 December 1932 – 4 May 1996) was an Australian rules footballer who played with South Melbourne in the Victorian Football League (VFL).
