= Fred Dhu =

Australian rugby league footballer

Personal information
- Full name: Frederick William James Dhu
- Born: 18 January 1916 Maclean, New South Wales, Australia
- Died: 24 May 1996 (aged 80) Sydney, New South Wales, Australia

Playing information
- Position: Centre
Club
Years	Team	Pld	T	G	FG	P
1936–45	North Sydney	76	41	0	0	123
Representative
Years	Team	Pld	T	G	FG	P
1938	New South Wales	2	3	0	0	9

Fred Dhu (1916–1996) was an Australian rugby league footballer who played in the 1930s and 1940s. He played in the NSWRFL premiership for North Sydney as a centre.

== Playing career ==
Dhu began his first grade career in 1936 and played 10 seasons with Norths. His brother Herb also played for Norths between 1938 and 1942. Dhu missed out on playing in the 1943 grand final against Newtown which would turn out to be North Sydney's last ever grand final appearance before exiting the competition in 1999. Dhu also played 3 games for New South Wales in 1938. He retired at the end of the 1945 season.
