= Tori Geib =

American chef and patient advocate (1986–2021)

- Born: Victoria Kathryn Geib; March 2, 1986; Marion, Ohio, U.S.
- Died: November 1, 2021 (aged 35); Columbus, Ohio, U.S.
- Cause of death: Metastatic breast cancer
- Education: Columbus State Community College; Mount Vernon Nazarene University
- Occupations: Chef, patient advocate

Victoria Kathryn Geib (March 2, 1986 – November 1, 2021) was an American chef and cancer patient advocate. She worked as a hospital catering chef before her metastatic breast cancer diagnosis in 2016. Geib advocated for legislative changes against fail first requirements leading to the signing into law of Ohio Senate Bill 252 in December 2020.

== Life ==
Geib was born on March 2, 1986, in Marion, Ohio, to Victor Madison and Bonnie Sue (Adams) Geib. She had a sister, Sarah Elizabeth Geib. Geib graduated from Columbus State Community College and Mount Vernon Nazarene University. She worked as a hospital catering chef and competed in Ohio cooking competitions. Due to her cancer diagnosis, Geib had to quit her job two years after school.

The week of her birthday in 2016, Geib of Bellefontaine, Ohio, was diagnosed with stage 4 metastatic breast cancer. Eight months later, she was told the condition was terminal. She was a patient at The James Cancer Hospital. She used social media and established a blog, Metastatic Millennial, to share information about her fight against cancer. In 2019, she was the honorary chair of the Columbus Susan G. Komen for the Cure. She advocated for the Ohio General Assembly to make legislative changes against fail first requirements. State senators Bob Hackett and Hearcel Craig sponsored Senate Bill 252 which was signed by Governor Mike DeWine on December 21, 2020. It prohibits fail first insurance policies for stage 4 metastatic cancer patients.

Geib died on November 1, 2021, at Kobacker House in Columbus, Ohio.
