= József Pércsi =

Hungarian wrestler

József Pércsi (19 March 1942 – June 2011) was a Hungarian wrestler. Born in Földes, he competed in the 1972 Summer Olympics.
