= Kurt Rusterholz =

Swiss Greco-Roman wrestler (born 1927)

Personal information
- Born: 1 July 1927 Zürich, Switzerland
- Height: 1.82 m (6 ft 0 in)
- Weight: 87 kg (192 lb)

Sport
- Sport: Greco-Roman wrestling
Medal record
Men's Greco-Roman wrestling
Representing Switzerland
World Championships
Bronze medal – third place	1953 Naples	-87 kg

Kurt Rusterholz (born 1 July 1927) is a Swiss retired Greco-Roman wrestler. He competed at 1960 Olympics as a light heavyweight (-87 kg) and finished in 12th place overall. He won a bronze medal at the 1953 World Wrestling Championships, and subsequently placed 6th at the 1962 event. He was additionally a six time Swiss national champion (1950, 1957–62).

In December 1955, Rusterholz represented Switzerland in a friendly international set of eight matches against Turkey in Zurich. In front of 500 spectators, he lost his match against Boecke. Turkey defeated Switzerland 8-0.
