= Héctor Álvarez (wrestler) =

Mexican wrestler

Héctor Alvarez
Personal information
- Born: 21 December 1946 (age 79) Michoacán, Mexico

Sport
- Sport: Wrestling

Héctor Álvarez Ayala (born 21 December 1946) is a Mexican wrestler. He competed in the men's Greco-Roman 87 kg at the 1968 Summer Olympics.
