= Rex Rogers =

Australian cricketer

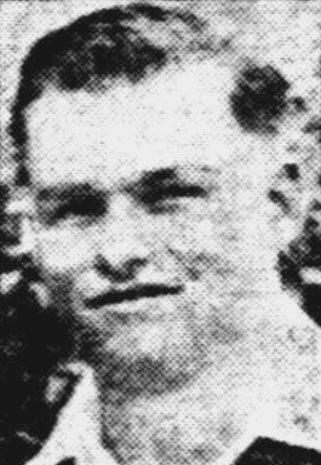

Personal information
- Full name: Rex Ernest Rogers
- Born: 24 August 1916; Cairns, Queensland, Australia
- Died: 22 May 1996 (aged 79); Coorparoo, Queensland, Australia
- Batting: Left-handed
- Bowling: Right-arm medium-fast
- Relatives: Noel Rogers (brother)
- Source: Cricinfo, 6 October 2020

Rex Rogers (24 August 1916 – 22 May 1996) was an Australian cricketer. He played in 56 first-class matches for Queensland between 1935 and 1949.

== See also ==
- List of Queensland first-class cricketers
