= Valentin Olenik =

Russian wrestler (1939–1987)

Medal record

Men's Greco-Roman wrestling

Representing the Soviet Union

Olympic Games
| Silver medal – second place | 1968 Mexico City | middleweight |

World Championships
| Gold medal – first place | 1966 Toledo | middleweight |
| Silver medal – second place | 1967 Bucharest | middleweight |

Valentin Grigoryevich Olenik (Russian: Валентин Григорьевич Оленик; 18 July 1939 – 12 February 1987) was a Russian wrestler who competed in the 1964 Summer Olympics and in the 1968 Summer Olympics.
