= Antero Vanhanen =

Finnish wrestler (1935–1986)

Personal information
- Nationality: Finnish
- Born: 1 April 1935 Leningrad, Russia
- Died: 30 December 1986 (aged 51) Helsinki, Finland

Sport
- Sport: Wrestling

Antero Vanhanen (1 April 1935 – 30 December 1986) was a Finnish wrestler. He competed in the men's Greco-Roman light heavyweight at the 1960 Summer Olympics.
