= Iosif Matusec =

Romanian gymnast

- Alternative name: József Matusek
- Born: 15 February 1907 Arad, Austria-Hungary
- Died: 15 May 1996 (aged 89)

Gymnastics career
- Discipline: Men's artistic gymnastics
- Country represented: Romania

Iosif Matusec (15 February 1907 – 15 May 1996) was a Romanian gymnast. He competed in eight events at the 1936 Summer Olympics.
