= Tevfik Kış =

Turkish wrestler (1934–2019)

Medal record

Men's Greco-Roman Wrestling

Representing Turkey

Olympic Games
Gold medal – first place	1960 Rome	87 kg

World Championships
Gold medal – first place	1962 Toledo	87 kg
Gold medal – first place	1963 Helsingborg	87 kg
Silver medal – second place	1966 Toledo	87 kg

European Championships
Gold medal – first place	1966 Essen	87 kg

Mediterranean Games
Gold medal – first place	1959 Beirut	97 kg

Balkan Championships
Silver medal – second place	1959 Istanbul	97 kg

Tevfik Kış (10 August 1934 – 4 September 2019) was a Turkish European, World and Olympic champion sports wrestler in the Light heavyweight class (87 kg) and a trainer. He won the gold medal in men's Greco-Roman wrestling at the 1960 Olympics.

Born in 1934 in the village of Pelitçik in the Kargı district in the Çorum Province, he began wrestling in 1956. Competing in Greco-Roman style, Kış became a gold medalist in wrestling at the 1960 Summer Olympics. He won later World and European championships. After his unsuccessful participation at the 1968 Summer Olympics in Mexico City, he retired from the active sports and served then as trainer of his country's national team. Kış was a co-founder of the Turkish Wrestling Foundation and was active on its board.

He was married with two children and lived in Ankara running a restaurant.

== Achievements ==
- 1959 Balkan Championships in Istanbul, Turkey - silver (Light heavyweight)
- 1959 Mediterranean Games in Beirut, Lebanon - gold (Light heavyweight)
- 1960 Olympics in Rome, Italy - gold (Light heavyweight)
- 1961 World Championships in Yokohama, Japan - 4th (Light heavyweight)
- 1962 World Championships in Toledo, Ohio, U.S. - gold (Light heavyweight)
- 1963 World Championships in Helsinki, Finland - gold (Light heavyweight)
- 1965 World Championships in Tampere, Finland - 4th (Light heavyweight)
- 1966 World Championships in Helsinki, Finland - silver (Light heavyweight)
- 1966 European Championships in Essen, Germany - gold (Light heavyweight)
- 1967 European Championships in Minsk, Soviet Union - 5th (Light heavyweight)
