= Columbus State Community College =

Public college in Columbus, Ohio, US

Coordinates: 39°58′10″N 82°59′19″W

- Former names: Columbus Area Technician's School (1963–1964); Columbus Technical Institute (1965–1986)
- Type: Public community college
- Established: 1963; 63 years ago
- Parent institution: University System of Ohio
- Academic affiliations: Space-grant
- Endowment: $37 million
- President: David Harrison
- Students: 26,900 (fall 2023)
- Location: Columbus, Ohio, United States
- Campus: Urban
- Colors: Blue, Black, White
- Nickname: Cougars
- Sporting affiliations: NJCAA; OCCAC
- Website: www.cscc.edu

Columbus State Community College (CSCC) is a public community college in Columbus, Ohio, United States. Founded as Columbus Area Technician's School in 1963, it was renamed Columbus Technical Institute in 1965 and was renamed again to its current name in 1987. The college has grown from an initial enrollment of 67 students in 1963 to its current enrollment of over 41,000+ students across two campuses, nine regional learning centers, and online courses.

== Academics ==
Columbus State offers two-year career programs in more than 50 areas of business, health, public service, human service, engineering technologies, and facility maintenance as well as transfer programs for students interested in completing the first two years of a bachelor's degree, then transferring to a four-year university.

In 2023, Ohio Health announced a $25 million donation as part of a $120 million investment in Columbus State to increase professionals trained in healthcare-related fields.

== Campuses ==
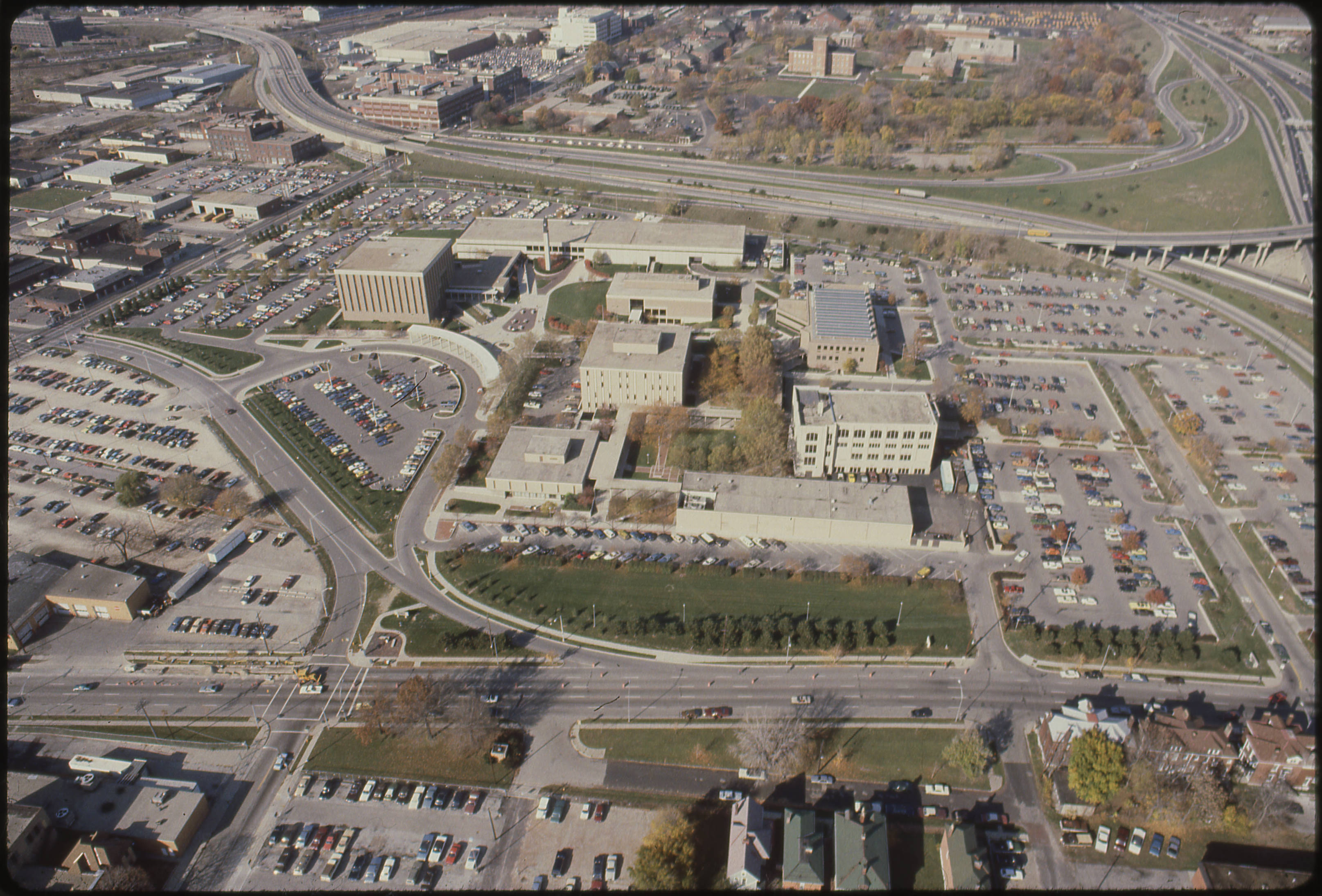
Main campus c. 1970s

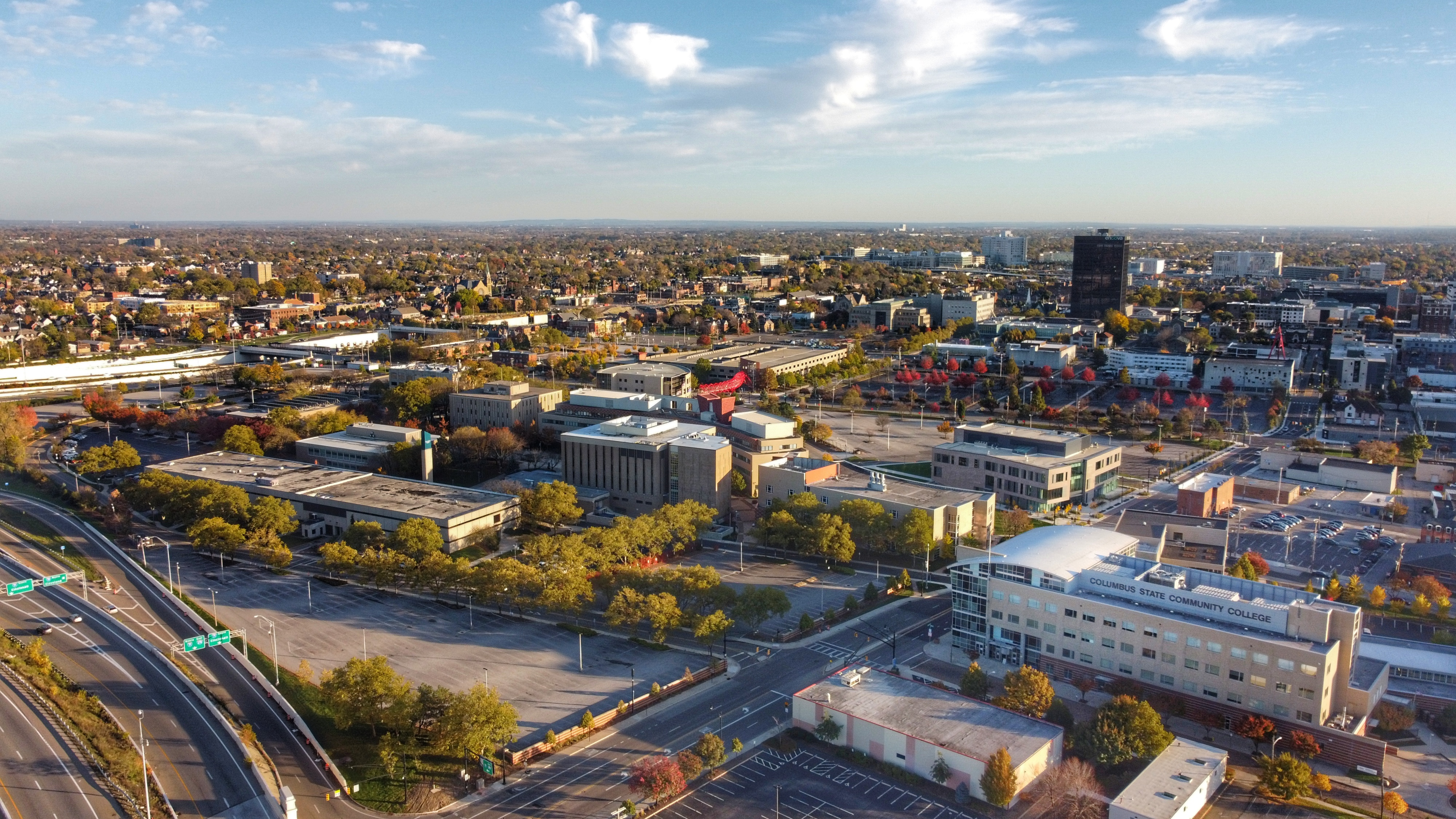
Aerial view of the main campus, 2020

The 70-acre Columbus campus is located near downtown Columbus, Ohio. It consists of 26 buildings, and was previously the site of Aquinas College High School. The newer Delaware campus is located off of US 23 and consists of two buildings and a large green space. The first building was completed in 2010 and can accommodate ~3,000 students. In 2011, Columbus State partnered with Ohio State University to allow students and faculty from both schools to work out of the new facility.

In addition, Columbus State operates 6 off-campus centers in the suburban neighborhoods of Dublin, Westerville, Marysville, Grove City, Reynoldsburg, and southwest Columbus.

== Student life ==
=== Literary magazine ===
Columbus State annually publishes a literary magazine called Spring Street. It comprises poetry, fiction, photography and other visual arts submitted by Columbus State students, faculty, staff, and alumni. 80 percent of the layout and publishing process is completed by students.

=== Athletics ===
The Cougars have four varsity-level sports teams, all of which compete at the National Junior College Athletic Association NJCAA Division II level. Before the 2007–08 academic year, the college had nine sports, but due to budget constraints, baseball, softball, track and field, cross country, and soccer were eliminated. At the same time, the women's volleyball and golf teams were promoted from the Division III level to their current level, allowing scholarships to be offered to student-athletes. The Cougars are also members of the Ohio Community College Athletic Conference OCCAC. In a span of three seasons (2003–2005), the volleyball program competed in three consecutive NJCAA DIII national tournaments, finishing as high as fourth nationally in 2004. The Cougars were paced by five all-Americans during that time. After moving to Division II, Head Coach Scott Nichols led the Lady Cougars to a 2008 NJCAA DII volleyball sixth-place finish and a 2009 NJCAA DII volleyball seventh-place finish.

In March 2008, the Columbus State men's basketball team clinched their first ever visit to the NJCAA National Championship in Danville, Illinois. Head Coach Pat Carlisle won three games against highly ranked teams before losing the championship game to Mott Community College on March 22. In 2009, the men's basketball team finished in 9th place overall. Columbus State is also home to the 1993 and 2003 NJCAA DIII Men's Golf National Champions, 2010 and 2011 NJCAA Women's Golf National participants, 2001 NJCAA DIII Baseball National Runner-up, 2004 NJCAA DIII Women's Cross Country 3rd Place finish, and the 2001 and 2003 NJCAA DIII Women's Cross Country 6th Place finish.

== Notable alumni ==
- David Miller, President and Chief Operating Officer of Cameron Mitchell Restaurants
- Curtis Duffy, owner of the restaurant Grace
- Tori Geib, chef and cancer patient advocate
- Terri B. Jamison, judge at Franklin County Court of Common Pleas
- Alex Dontre, drummer of the comedy metal band Psychostick
- Ma Dong-seok, A popular South Korean-born American actor, also known as Don Lee.

== See also ==
- Statue of Christopher Columbus (Columbus State Community College)
