= Fernando Garcia (sportsperson) =

Filipino sportsperson

Fernando García
Personal information
- Nationality: Filipino
- Born: April 18, 1935 (age 90)
- Height: 6 ft 0 in (183 cm)
- Weight: 201 lb (91 kg)

Sport
- Sport: Judo; Wrestling

Fernando H. García (born April 18, 1935) is a Filipino sportsperson who competed in wrestling and judo. He competed in two wrestling events at the 1964 Summer Olympics and in two judo events at the 1972 Summer Olympics.
