= Kenjiro Hiraki =

Japanese wrestler

Personal information
- Nationality: Japanese
- Born: 17 February 1940 (age 85); Wakayama, Japan

Sport
- Sport: Wrestling

Kenjiro Hiraki (開 健次郎, Hiraki Kenjirō, born 17 February 1940) is a Japanese wrestler. He competed at the 1964 Summer Olympics and the 1968 Summer Olympics.
