= Czesław Kwieciński =

Polish Greco-Roman wrestler (born 1942)

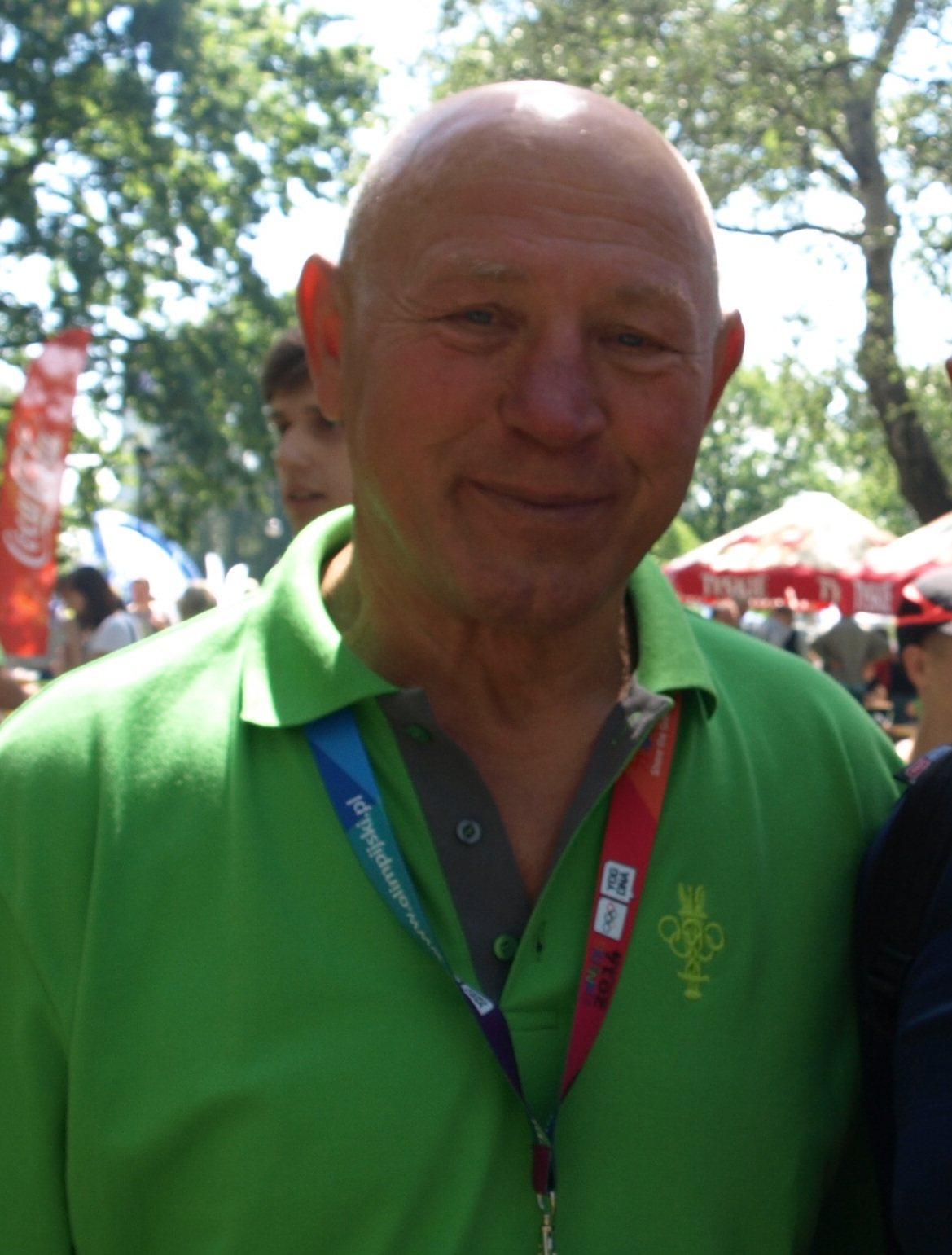

Medal record

Men's Greco-Roman wrestling

Representing Poland

Olympic Games
Bronze medal – third place	1972 Munich	Light-heavyweight
Bronze medal – third place	1976 Montreal	Light-heavyweight

Czesław Kwieciński (born 16 November 1942) is a Polish wrestler who competed from 1964 to 1980 in the Summer Olympics. He was born in Romaškai, Lithuania. Kwieciński was a bronze medalist at the 1972 Summer Olympics and 1976 Summer Olympics in wrestling in the 90 kg category (light-heavyweight). He married Ewa Gryziecka, a world record breaker in the javelin throw, and they had three children, settling in Gliwice.

Olympic Games
Preceded by Grzegorz Śledziewski	Flagbearer for Poland; 1980 Moscow	Succeeded by Bogdan Daras
