= Nicolae Neguț =

Romanian wrestler (born 1945)

Personal information
- Born: 17 October 1945 (age 81) Bucharest, Romania

Sport
- Sport: Greco-Roman wrestling
Medal record
Representing Romania
World Championships
| Bronze medal – third place | 1969 Mar del Plata | -90 kg |
Summer Universiade
| Bronze medal – third place | 1973 Moscow | -90 kg |

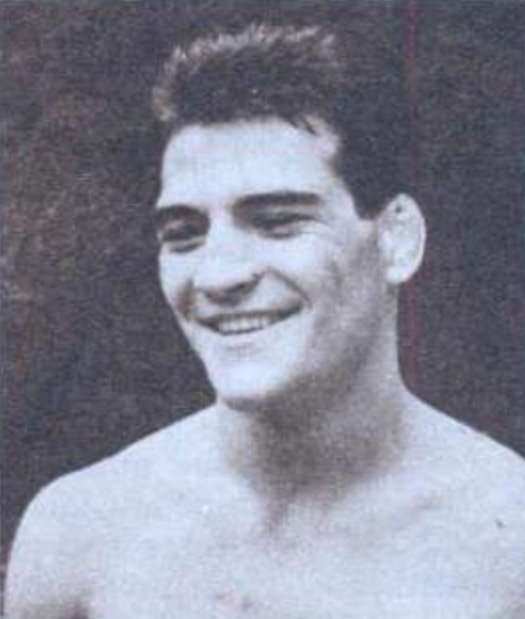
Nicolae Neguț, 1968.

Nicolae Neguţ (born 17 October 1945) is a Romanian former wrestler who competed in the 1968 Summer Olympics and in the 1972 Summer Olympics.
