= Robert Geib =

Luxembourgish footballer

Personal information
- Date of birth: 2 November 1911
- Place of birth: Luxembourg City, Luxembourg
- Date of death: 8 May 1996 (aged 84)
- Place of death: Luxembourg City, Luxembourg

International career
Years	Team	Apps	(Gls)
- Luxembourg

Robert Geib (2 November 1911 – 8 May 1996) was a Luxembourgish footballer. He competed in the men's tournament at the 1936 Summer Olympics.
