= José Panizo (wrestler) =

Spanish wrestler (1936–2018)

Personal information
- Nationality: Spanish
- Born: 5 October 1936 Madrid, Spain
- Died: 24 November 2018 (aged 82)

Sport
- Sport: Wrestling

José Panizo (5 October 1936 – 24 November 2018) was a Spanish wrestler. He competed at the 1960 Summer Olympics and the 1964 Summer Olympics.
