= Gheorghe Popovici (wrestler) =

Romanian wrestler

Personal information
- Nationality: Romanian
- Born: 4 May 1938 (age 88) Chișinău, Moldova

Sport
- Sport: Wrestling

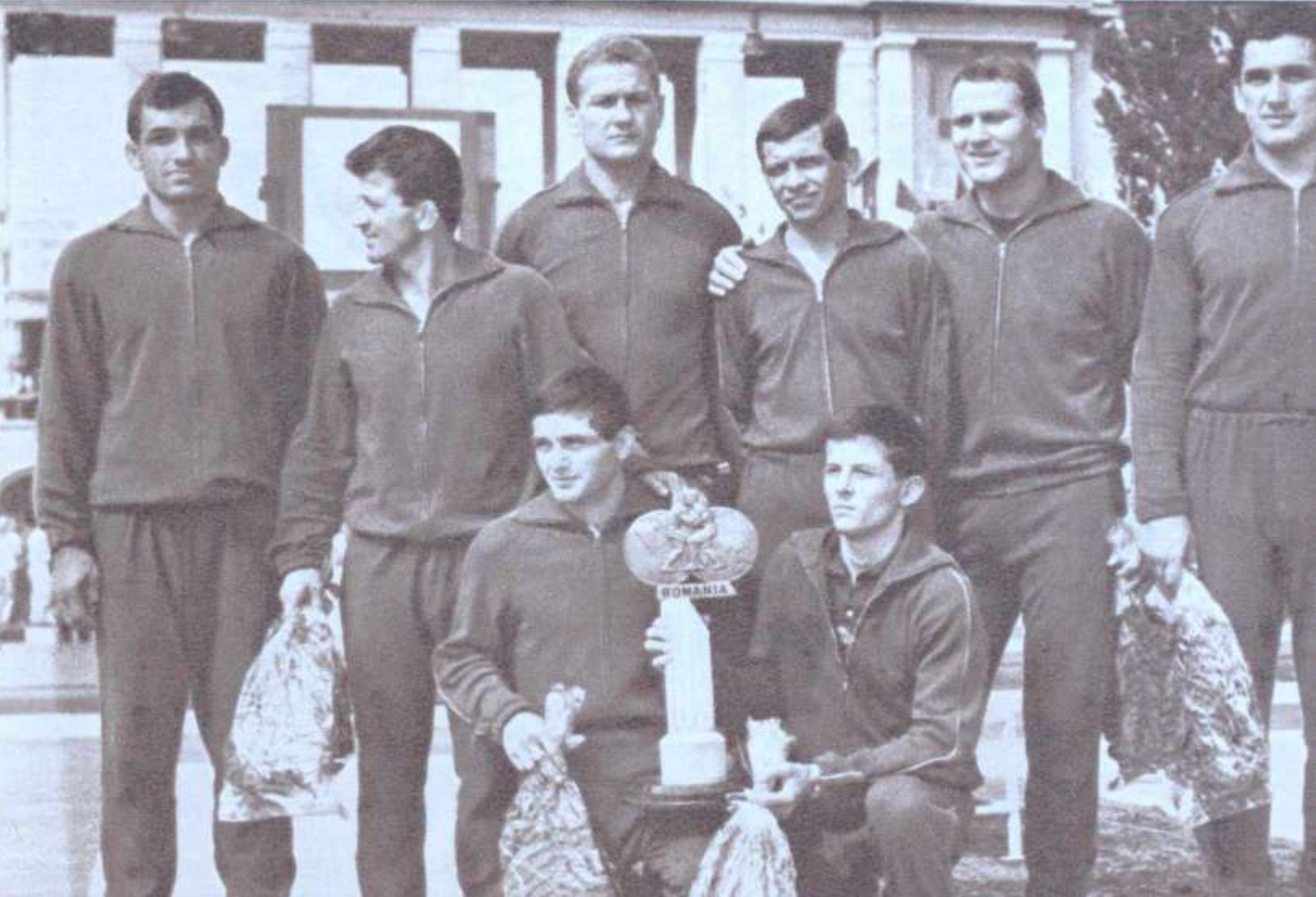
The Romanian wrestling team at the 1967 World Wrestling Championships, which placed third

Gheorghe Popovici (born 4 May 1938) is a Romanian wrestler. He competed at the 1960 Summer Olympics and the 1964 Summer Olympics.
