= Eugen Wiesberger Jr. =

Austrian wrestler

Personal information
- Nationality: Austrian
- Born: 30 December 1933 Linz, Austria
- Died: 2 May 1996 (aged 62)

Sport
- Sport: Wrestling

Eugen Wiesberger Jr. (30 December 1933 – 2 May 1996) was an Austrian wrestler. He competed at the 1956 Summer Olympics, the 1960 Summer Olympics and the 1964 Summer Olympics.
