= Julio Graffigna =

Argentine wrestler (1931–2015)

Personal information
- Born: 9 July 1931; Buenos Aires, Argentina
- Died: 4 April 2015 (aged 83)

Sport
- Sport: Wrestling

Julio Roberto Graffigna (9 July 1931 – 4 April 2015) was an Argentine wrestler. He competed at the 1960 Summer Olympics, the 1964 Summer Olympics and the 1968 Summer Olympics.
