= Hasan Güngör =

Turkish wrestler (1934–2011)

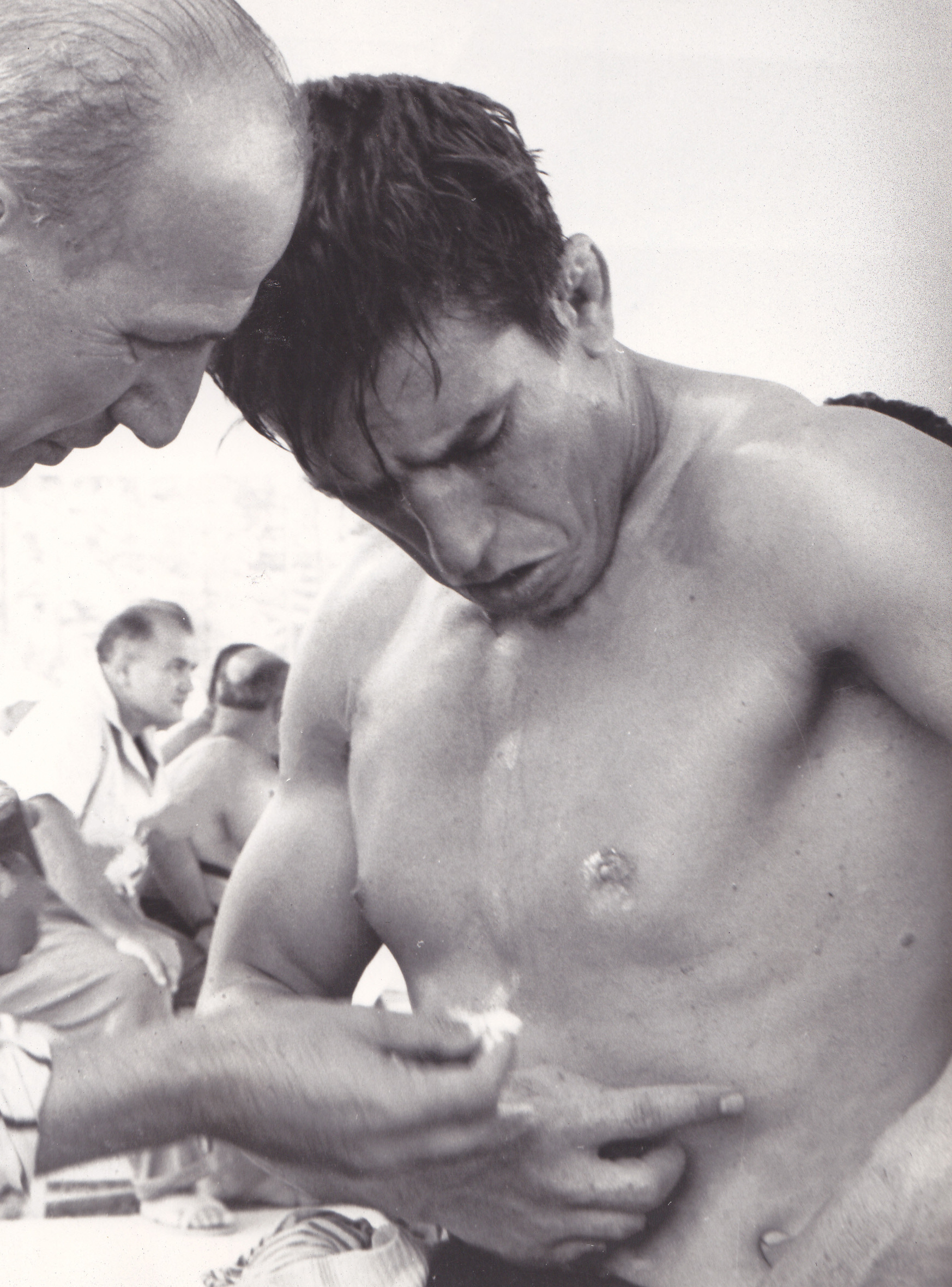
- Hasan Güngör at the 1960 Olympics

Personal information
- Born: 5 July 1934 Acıpayam, Denizli Province, Turkey
- Died: 13 October 2011 (aged 77) Denizli, Turkey
- Height: 1.78 m (5 ft 10 in)

Sport
- Sport: Freestyle wrestling
Medal record
Men's freestyle wrestling
Representing Turkey
Olympic Games
Gold medal – first place	1960 Rome	79 kg
Silver medal – second place	1964 Tokyo	87 kg
World Championships
Silver medal – second place	1962 Toledo	87 kg
Silver medal – second place	1966 Toledo	87 kg
Bronze medal – third place	1957 Istanbul	79 kg
Bronze medal – third place	1961 Yokohama	87 kg
European Championships
Gold medal – first place	1966 Karlsruhe	87 kg
World Cup
Gold medal – first place	1958 Sofia	79 kg
Mediterranean Games
Gold medal – first place	1963 Naples	87 kg
Balkan Championships
Gold medal – first place	1959 Istanbul	79 kg
Silver medal – second place	1960 Burgas	79 kg
Silver medal – second place	1963 Istanbul	87 kg
Bronze medal – third place	1965 Yambol	87 kg

Hasan Güngör (5 July 1934 – 13 October 2011) was a middleweight Turkish wrestler and a wrestling coach. He won a gold medal at the 1960 Olympics and a silver medal at the 1964 Olympics, as well as multiple medals at the World, European and Balkan championships.

== Wrestling career ==
Hasan Güngör grew up in Acıpayam district of Denizli and started wrestling there. He developed himself as a freestyle wrestler. His international career began in 1957 when he placed third in the middleweight division at the World Championships in Istanbul. He defeated 1956 Olympic champion Nikola Stanchev from Bulgaria. Güngör won the gold medal at the 1958 Wrestling World Cup held in Sofia in 1958 instead of the World Championships.

In 1959, he traveled with the Turkish national team to the Federal Republic of Germany on a sparring trip and defeated the best German middleweights of the time, Horst Heß, Johann Sterr and Georg Utz.

Hasan Güngör won the gold medal in men's freestyle 79 kg at the 1960 Summer Olympics held at the Basilica of Maxentius in Rome, Italy. Hasan Güngör defeated Argentine Julio Graffigna in the first round by fall at 9:31 minutes of the bout, and Bulgarian Prodan Gardzhev by decision in the second round. In the third round he drew with Iranian Mansour Mahdizadeh. In the fourth round, he defeated Hungarian Géza Hollósi by decision and reached the final round. In the final round, he defeated American Ed DeWitt in 5:06 by pinfall to become the Olympic champion.

Güngör began competing in the light heavyweight division in 1961. At the 1961 World Wrestling Championships in Yokohama, Japan, he tied with Olympic champion and multiple-time world champion Iranian Gholamreza Takhti, but lost to Soviet representative Boris Gurevich and won the bronze medal. He finished second at the 1962 World Wrestling Championships in Toledo, Ohio, United States. He tied with that year's world champion, Iranian Mansour Mehdizadeh, and defeated the previous year's world champion Boris Gurevich on points.

He won the silver medal in the 1964 Summer Olympics at the men's freestyle 87 kg held at the Komazawa Gymnasium in Tokyo, Japan. Hasan Güngör defeated South Korean Gang Du-man by fall in the first round, Panamanian Alfonso González by fall in the second round, and Soviet Shota Lomidze by decision in the third round to reach the fourth round. In the fourth round he lost to Iranian Mansour Mahdizadeh by decision. In the fifth round he defeated American Dan Brand by decision. In the final round he lost to Bulgarian Prodan Gardzhev by decision and finished second in the Olympics.

He became the European champion by defeating Czechoslovak Josef Urban in the final of the 1966 European Wrestling Championships in Karlsruhe, West Germany. Following two fourth-place finishes at the 1967 European Wrestling Championships in Istanbul, Turkey and the World Championships in New Delhi, he ended his career and worked as a coach in Turkey for many years. In his coaching career, he won first place in the Balkan Championships with the Young National Team and third place in the World Championships in Istanbul in 1974 with the A National Team.

He died on 13 October 2011 in Denizli.
