= Wrestling at the 1960 Summer Olympics – Men's freestyle middleweight =

Wrestling at the Olympics

Men's freestyle middleweight at the Games of the XVII Olympiad
- Venue: Basilica of Maxentius
- Dates: 1–6 September 1960
- Competitors: 19 from 19 nations

Medalists
1st place, gold medalist(s)		Hasan Güngör	Turkey
2nd place, silver medalist(s)		Giorgi Skhirt'ladze	Soviet Union
3rd place, bronze medalist(s)		Hans Antonsson	Sweden

The men's freestyle middleweight competition at the 1960 Summer Olympics in Rome took place from 1 to 6 September at the Basilica of Maxentius. Nations were limited to one competitor. Middleweight was the third-heaviest category, including wrestlers weighing 73 to 79 kilograms (160.9 to 174.2 lb).

== Competition format ==
This freestyle wrestling competition continued to use the "bad points" elimination system introduced at the 1928 Summer Olympics for Greco-Roman and at the 1932 Summer Olympics for freestyle wrestling, though adjusted the point values slightly. Wins by fall continued to be worth 0 points and wins by decision continued to be worth 1 point. Losses by fall, however, were now worth 4 points (up from 3). Losses by decision were worth 3 points (consistent with most prior years, though in some losses by split decision had been worth only 2 points). Ties were now allowed, worth 2 points for each wrestler. The elimination threshold was also increased from 5 points to 6 points. The medal round concept, used in 1952 and 1956 requiring a round-robin amongst the medalists even if one or more finished a round with enough points for elimination, was used only if exactly three wrestlers remained after a round—if two competitors remained, they faced off head-to-head; if only one, he was the gold medalist.

== Results ==
=== Round 1 ===
Bouts

Winner	Nation	Victory Type	Loser	Nation
Takashi Nagai	Japan	Fall	Ronald Hunt	Australia
Géza Hollósi	Hungary	Tie	Prodan Gardzhev	Bulgaria
Hasan Güngör	Turkey	Fall	Julio Graffigna	Argentina
Fred Thomas	New Zealand	Fall	Mansour Mahdizadeh	Iran
Hans Antonsson	Sweden	Fall	Viljo Punkari	Finland
Madho Singh	India	Fall	Alan Butts	Great Britain
Ed DeWitt	United States	Decision	Germano Caraffini	Italy
Georg Utz	United Team of Germany	Fall	Henri Mottier	Switzerland
Giorgi Skhirt'ladze	Soviet Union	Fall	Mohammad Asif Khokan	Afghanistan
Muhammad Faiz	Pakistan	Bye	N/A	N/A

Points

Rank	Wrestler	Nation	Start	Earned	Total
1	Hans Antonsson	Sweden	0	0	0
1	Muhammad Faiz	Pakistan	0	0	0
1	Hasan Güngör	Turkey	0	0	0
1	Takashi Nagai	Japan	0	0	0
1	Madho Singh	India	0	0	0
1	Giorgi Skhirt'ladze	Soviet Union	0	0	0
1	Fred Thomas	New Zealand	0	0	0
1	Georg Utz	United Team of Germany	0	0	0
9	Ed DeWitt	United States	0	1	1
10	Prodan Gardzhev	Bulgaria	0	2	2
10	Géza Hollósi	Hungary	0	2	2
12	Germano Caraffini	Italy	0	3	3
13	Alan Butts	Great Britain	0	4	4
13	Julio Graffigna	Argentina	0	4	4
13	Ronald Hunt	Australia	0	4	4
13	Mohammad Asif Khokan	Afghanistan	0	4	4
13	Mansour Mahdizadeh	Iran	0	4	4
13	Viljo Punkari	Finland	0	4	4
13	Henri Mottier	Switzerland	0	4	4

=== Round 2 ===
Bouts

Winner	Nation	Victory Type	Loser	Nation
Takashi Nagai	Japan	Decision	Muhammad Faiz	Pakistan
Géza Hollósi	Hungary	Fall	Ronald Hunt	Australia
Hasan Güngör	Turkey	Decision	Prodan Gardzhev	Bulgaria
Fred Thomas	New Zealand	Decision	Julio Graffigna	Argentina
Mansour Mahdizadeh	Iran	Decision	Hans Antonsson	Sweden
Viljo Punkari	Finland	Fall	Alan Butts	Great Britain
Madho Singh	India	Fall	Germano Caraffini	Italy
Ed DeWitt	United States	Fall	Henri Mottier	Switzerland
Giorgi Skhirt'ladze	Soviet Union	Fall	Georg Utz	United Team of Germany
Mohammad Asif Khokan	Afghanistan	Bye	N/A	N/A

Points

Rank	Wrestler	Nation	Start	Earned	Total
1	Madho Singh	India	0	0	0
1	Giorgi Skhirt'ladze	Soviet Union	0	0	0
3	Ed DeWitt	United States	1	0	1
3	Hasan Güngör	Turkey	0	1	1
3	Takashi Nagai	Japan	0	1	1
3	Fred Thomas	New Zealand	0	1	1
7	Géza Hollósi	Hungary	2	0	2
8	Hans Antonsson	Sweden	0	3	3
8	Muhammad Faiz	Pakistan	0	3	3
10	Mohammad Asif Khokan	Afghanistan	4	0	4
10	Viljo Punkari	Finland	4	0	4
10	Georg Utz	United Team of Germany	0	4	4
13	Prodan Gardzhev	Bulgaria	2	3	5
13	Mansour Mahdizadeh	Iran	4	1	5
15	Germano Caraffini	Italy	3	4	7
15	Julio Graffigna	Argentina	4	3	7
17	Alan Butts	Great Britain	4	4	8
17	Ronald Hunt	Australia	4	4	8
17	Henri Mottier	Switzerland	4	4	8

=== Round 3 ===
Faiz withdrew after his bout.

Bouts

Winner	Nation	Victory Type	Loser	Nation
Muhammad Faiz	Pakistan	Decision	Mohammad Asif Khokan	Afghanistan
Géza Hollósi	Hungary	Decision	Takashi Nagai	Japan
Prodan Gardzhev	Bulgaria	Fall	Fred Thomas	New Zealand
Hasan Güngör	Turkey	Tie	Mansour Mahdizadeh	Iran
Hans Antonsson	Sweden	Decision	Madho Singh	India
Georg Utz	United Team of Germany	Decision	Viljo Punkari	Finland
Ed DeWitt	United States	Decision	Giorgi Skhirt'ladze	Soviet Union

Points

Rank	Wrestler	Nation	Start	Earned	Total
1	Ed DeWitt	United States	1	1	2
2	Hasan Güngör	Turkey	1	2	3
2	Géza Hollósi	Hungary	2	1	3
2	Madho Singh	India	0	3	3
2	Giorgi Skhirt'ladze	Soviet Union	0	3	3
6	Hans Antonsson	Sweden	3	1	4
6	Takashi Nagai	Japan	1	3	4
8	Prodan Gardzhev	Bulgaria	5	0	5
8	Fred Thomas	New Zealand	1	4	5
8	Georg Utz	United Team of Germany	4	1	5
11	Muhammad Faiz	Pakistan	3	1	4*
12	Mohammad Asif Khokan	Afghanistan	4	3	7
12	Mansour Mahdizadeh	Iran	5	2	7
12	Viljo Punkari	Finland	4	3	7

=== Round 4 ===
Bouts

Winner	Nation	Victory Type	Loser	Nation
Prodan Gardzhev	Bulgaria	Decision	Takashi Nagai	Japan
Hasan Güngör	Turkey	Decision	Géza Hollósi	Hungary
Hans Antonsson	Sweden	Fall	Fred Thomas	New Zealand
Giorgi Skhirt'ladze	Soviet Union	Decision	Madho Singh	India
Ed DeWitt	United States	Decision	Georg Utz	United Team of Germany

Points

Rank	Wrestler	Nation	Start	Earned	Total
1	Ed DeWitt	United States	2	1	3
2	Hans Antonsson	Sweden	4	0	4
2	Hasan Güngör	Turkey	3	1	4
2	Giorgi Skhirt'ladze	Soviet Union	3	1	4
5	Prodan Gardzhev	Bulgaria	5	1	6
5	Géza Hollósi	Hungary	3	3	6
5	Madho Singh	India	3	3	6
8	Takashi Nagai	Japan	4	3	7
9	Georg Utz	United Team of Germany	5	3	8
10	Fred Thomas	New Zealand	5	4	9

=== Round 5 ===
The draw between Antonsson and Skhirt'ladze eliminated them both and left them tied in the standings for second place at 6 points (if either had won, the winner would have faced Güngör for the gold medal). Because head-to-head results could not break that tie, lighter body weight was used and Skhirt'ladze took the silver medal.

Bouts

Winner	Nation	Victory Type	Loser	Nation
Hasan Güngör	Turkey	Fall	Ed DeWitt	United States
Hans Antonsson	Sweden	Tie	Giorgi Skhirt'ladze	Soviet Union

Points

Rank	Wrestler	Nation	Start	Earned	Total
1st place, gold medalist(s)	Hasan Güngör	Turkey	4	0	4
2nd place, silver medalist(s)	Giorgi Skhirt'ladze	Soviet Union	4	2	6
3rd place, bronze medalist(s)	Hans Antonsson	Sweden	4	2	6
4	Ed DeWitt	United States	3	4	7
