= Wrestling at the 1964 Summer Olympics – Men's freestyle middleweight =

Olympic wrestling tournament

Men's freestyle middleweight at the Games of the XVIII Olympiad
- Venue: Komazawa Gymnasium
- Dates: 11–14 October 1964
- Competitors: 16 from 16 nations

Medalists
1st place, gold medalist(s)		Prodan Gardzhev	Bulgaria
2nd place, silver medalist(s)		Hasan Güngör	Turkey
3rd place, bronze medalist(s)		Dan Brand	United States

The men's freestyle middleweight competition at the 1964 Summer Olympics in Tokyo took place from 11 to 14 October at the Komazawa Gymnasium. Nations were limited to one competitor. Middleweight was the third-heaviest category, including wrestlers weighing 78 to 87 kilograms (172.0 to 191.8 lb).

== Competition format ==
This freestyle wrestling competition continued to use the "bad points" elimination system introduced at the 1928 Summer Olympics for Greco-Roman and at the 1932 Summer Olympics for freestyle wrestling, as adjusted at the 1960 Summer Olympics. Each bout awarded 4 points. If the victory was by fall, the winner received 0 and the loser 4. If the victory was by decision, the winner received 1 and the loser 3. If the bout was tied, each wrestler received 2 points. A wrestler who accumulated 6 or more points was eliminated. Rounds continued until there were 3 or fewer uneliminated wrestlers. If only 1 wrestler remained, he received the gold medal. If 2 wrestlers remained, point totals were ignored and they faced each other for gold and silver (if they had already wrestled each other, that result was used). If 3 wrestlers remained, point totals were ignored and a round-robin was held among those 3 to determine medals (with previous head-to-head results, if any, counting for this round-robin).

== Results ==
=== Round 1 ===
Bouts

Winner	Nation	Victory Type	Loser	Nation
Tatsuo Sasaki	Japan	Decision	Günther Bauch	United Team of Germany
Mansour Mahdizadeh	Iran	Decision	Géza Hollósi	Hungary
Muhammad Faiz	Pakistan	Fall	Alfonso González	Panama
Hasan Güngör	Turkey	Fall	Gang Du-man	South Korea
Rudolf Kobelt	Switzerland	Fall	Jit Singh	India
Shota Lomidze	Soviet Union	Tie	Prodan Gardzhev	Bulgaria
Dan Brand	United States	Fall	Theunis van Wyk	Zambia
Khorloogiin Bayanmönkh	Mongolia	Decision	Fernando García	Philippines

Points

Rank	Wrestler	Nation	R1
1	Dan Brand	United States	0
1	Muhammad Faiz	Pakistan	0
1	Hasan Güngör	Turkey	0
1	Rudolf Kobelt	Switzerland	0
5	Khorloogiin Bayanmönkh	Mongolia	1
5	Mansour Mahdizadeh	Iran	1
5	Tatsuo Sasaki	Japan	1
8	Prodan Gardzhev	Bulgaria	2
8	Shota Lomidze	Soviet Union	2
10	Günther Bauch	United Team of Germany	3
10	Fernando García	Philippines	3
10	Géza Hollósi	Hungary	3
13	Alfonso González	Panama	4
13	Gang Du-man	South Korea	4
13	Jit Singh	India	4
13	Theunis van Wyk	Zambia	4

=== Round 2 ===
Five of the 16 wrestlers were eliminated, four with two losses and one with a loss by fall and a tie. Güngör was the only wrestler left with 0 points.

Bouts

Winner	Nation	Victory Type	Loser	Nation
Günther Bauch	United Team of Germany	Decision	Fernando García	Philippines
Tatsuo Sasaki	Japan	Fall	Khorloogiin Bayanmönkh	Mongolia
Géza Hollósi	Hungary	Fall	Theunis van Wyk	Zambia
Dan Brand	United States	Tie	Mansour Mahdizadeh	Iran
Hasan Güngör	Turkey	Fall	Alfonso González	Panama
Muhammad Faiz	Pakistan	Tie	Gang Du-man	South Korea
Shota Lomidze	Soviet Union	Decision	Rudolf Kobelt	Switzerland
Prodan Gardzhev	Bulgaria	Fall	Jit Singh	India

Points

Rank	Wrestler	Nation	R1	R2	Total
1	Hasan Güngör	Turkey	0	0	0
2	Tatsuo Sasaki	Japan	1	0	1
3	Dan Brand	United States	0	2	2
3	Muhammad Faiz	Pakistan	0	2	2
3	Prodan Gardzhev	Bulgaria	2	0	2
6	Géza Hollósi	Hungary	3	0	3
6	Rudolf Kobelt	Switzerland	0	3	3
6	Shota Lomidze	Soviet Union	2	1	3
6	Mansour Mahdizadeh	Iran	1	2	3
10	Günther Bauch	United Team of Germany	3	1	4
11	Khorloogiin Bayanmönkh	Mongolia	1	4	5
12	Gang Du-man	South Korea	4	2	6
12	Fernando García	Philippines	3	3	6
14	Alfonso González	Panama	4	4	8
14	Jit Singh	India	4	4	8
14	Theunis van Wyk	Zambia	4	4	8

=== Round 3 ===
Three wrestlers were eliminated. Güngör remained in the lead, now with 1 point.

Bouts

Winner	Nation	Victory Type	Loser	Nation
Günther Bauch	United Team of Germany	Decision	Khorloogiin Bayanmönkh	Mongolia
Dan Brand	United States	Decision	Tatsuo Sasaki	Japan
Géza Hollósi	Hungary	Decision	Muhammad Faiz	Pakistan
Mansour Mahdizadeh	Iran	Decision	Rudolf Kobelt	Switzerland
Hasan Güngör	Turkey	Decision	Shota Lomidze	Soviet Union
Prodan Gardzhev	Bulgaria	Bye	N/A	N/A

Points

Rank	Wrestler	Nation	R1	R2	R3	Total
1	Hasan Güngör	Turkey	0	0	1	1
2	Prodan Gardzhev	Bulgaria	2	0	0	2
3	Dan Brand	United States	0	2	1	3
4	Géza Hollósi	Hungary	3	0	1	4
4	Mansour Mahdizadeh	Iran	1	2	1	4
4	Tatsuo Sasaki	Japan	1	0	3	4
7	Günther Bauch	United Team of Germany	3	1	1	5
7	Muhammad Faiz	Pakistan	0	2	3	5
9	Rudolf Kobelt	Switzerland	0	3	3	6
9	Shota Lomidze	Soviet Union	2	1	3	6
11	Khorloogiin Bayanmönkh	Mongolia	1	4	3	8

=== Round 4 ===
Hollósi and Sasaki's draw eliminated both wrestlers. Bauch and Faiz were also eliminated in losses. Güngör's loss moved him to 4 points, now behind Gardzhev at 2 points and Brand at 3 points. Mahdizadeh picked up a 5th point.

Bouts

Winner	Nation	Victory Type	Loser	Nation
Prodan Gardzhev	Bulgaria	Fall	Günther Bauch	United Team of Germany
Tatsuo Sasaki	Japan	Tie	Géza Hollósi	Hungary
Dan Brand	United States	Fall	Muhammad Faiz	Pakistan
Mansour Mahdizadeh	Iran	Decision	Hasan Güngör	Turkey

Points

Rank	Wrestler	Nation	R1	R2	R3	R4	Total
1	Prodan Gardzhev	Bulgaria	2	0	0	0	2
2	Dan Brand	United States	0	2	1	0	3
3	Hasan Güngör	Turkey	0	0	1	3	4
4	Mansour Mahdizadeh	Iran	1	2	1	1	5
5	Géza Hollósi	Hungary	3	0	1	2	6
5	Tatsuo Sasaki	Japan	1	0	3	2	6
7	Günther Bauch	United Team of Germany	3	1	1	4	9
7	Muhammad Faiz	Pakistan	0	2	3	4	9

=== Round 5 ===
Mahdizadeh defeated Gardzhev, but was eliminated by the win while Gardzhev had only 5 points and continued. Brand was eliminated by his loss to Güngör, who also reached 5 points and was not eliminated. With Brand and Mahdizadeh both at 6 points, the bronze medal was decided by their head-to-head result from round 2; since it was a draw, Brand won due to his lower body weight.

Bouts

Winner	Nation	Victory Type	Loser	Nation
Mansour Mahdizadeh	Iran	Decision	Prodan Gardzhev	Bulgaria
Hasan Güngör	Turkey	Decision	Dan Brand	United States

Points

Rank	Wrestler	Nation	R1	R2	R3	R4	R5	Total
1	Prodan Gardzhev	Bulgaria	2	0	0	0	3	5
1	Hasan Güngör	Turkey	0	0	1	3	1	5
3rd place, bronze medalist(s)	Dan Brand	United States	0	2	1	0	3	6
4	Mansour Mahdizadeh	Iran	1	2	1	1	1	6

=== Final round ===
With two remaining wrestlers who had not yet faced each other, there was a final bout for the gold and silver medals. Gardzhev and Güngör wrestled to a draw. Gardzhev took the gold medal due to lower body weight.

Bouts

Winner	Nation	Victory Type	Loser	Nation
Prodan Gardzhev	Bulgaria	Decision	Hasan Güngör	Turkey

Points

Rank	Wrestler	Nation	Points
1st place, gold medalist(s)	Prodan Gardzhev	Bulgaria	2
2nd place, silver medalist(s)	Hasan Güngör	Turkey	2
