= 1961 World Wrestling Championships =

- Host city: Yokohama, Japan
- Dates: 1–7 June 1961
- Stadium: Hiyoshi Commemorative Hall

Champions
- Freestyle: Iran
- Greco-Roman: Soviet Union

The 1961 World Wrestling Championships were held in Yokohama, Japan from 1 to 7 June 1961.

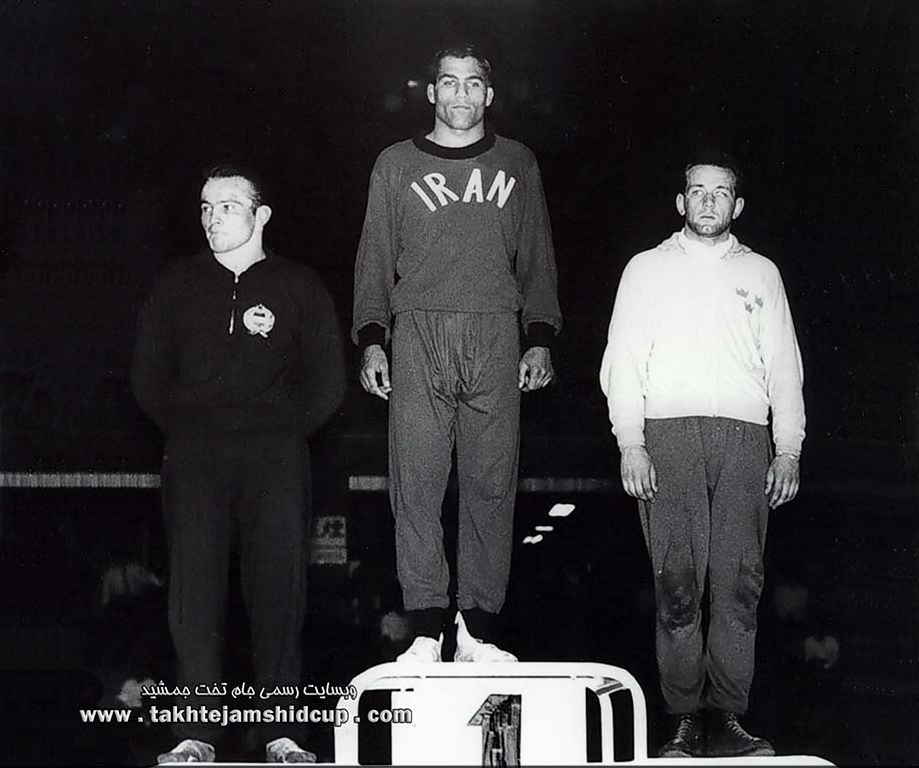
Medal winners of freestyle 79 kg. From left to right, Géza Hollósi, Mansour Mehdizadeh and Hans Antonsson

== Medal table ==
Rank	Nation	Gold	Silver	Bronze	Total
1	Soviet Union	7	4	1	12
2	Iran	5	1	2	8
3	Hungary	1	3	1	5
4	Romania	1	2	1	4
5	United Arab Republic	1	0	0	1
5	West Germany	1	0	0	1
7	Turkey	0	4	6	10
8	Sweden	0	1	1	2
8	Yugoslavia	0	1	1	2
10	Czechoslovakia	0	0	1	1
10	India	0	0	1	1
10	Japan	0	0	1	1
Totals (12 entries)		16	16	16	48

== Team ranking ==
Rank	Men's freestyle		Men's Greco-Roman	
Rank	Team	Points	Team	Points
1	Iran	41	Soviet Union	38
2	Soviet Union	33	Turkey	27.5
3	Turkey	26	Romania	23.5
4	Japan	15	Hungary	15
5	Hungary	13	Yugoslavia	12
6	United States	11.5	Czechoslovakia	8.5

== Medal summary ==
=== Freestyle ===
Event	Gold	Silver	Bronze
Flyweight; 52 kg	Ali Aliev; Soviet Union	Nasrollah Soltaninejad; Iran	Cemal Yanılmaz; Turkey
Bantamweight; 57 kg	Ebrahim Seifpour; Iran	János Varga; Hungary	Hüseyin Akbaş; Turkey
Featherweight; 62 kg	Vladimir Rubashvili; Soviet Union	Yunus Pehlivan; Turkey	Hamid Tavakkol; Iran
Lightweight; 67 kg	Mohammad Ali Sanatkaran; Iran	Vladimir Sinyavsky; Soviet Union	Udey Chand; India
Welterweight; 73 kg	Emam-Ali Habibi; Iran	Mikhail Bekmurzov; Soviet Union	Yutaka Kaneko; Japan
Middleweight; 79 kg	Mansour Mehdizadeh; Iran	Géza Hollósi; Hungary	Hans Antonsson; Sweden
Light heavyweight 87 kg	Gholamreza Takhti; Iran	Boris Gurevich; Soviet Union	Hasan Güngör; Turkey
Heavyweight +87 kg	Wilfried Dietrich; West Germany	Hamit Kaplan; Turkey	Aleksandr Medved; Soviet Union

=== Greco-Roman ===
Event	Gold	Silver	Bronze
Flyweight; 52 kg	Armais Sayadov; Soviet Union	Dumitru Pârvulescu; Romania	Burhan Bozkurt; Turkey
Bantamweight; 57 kg	Oleg Karavaev; Soviet Union	Ion Cernea; Romania	Jiří Švec; Czechoslovakia
Featherweight; 62 kg	Moustafa Hamid Mansour; United Arab Republic	Yaşar Yılmaz; Turkey	Alireza Ghelichkhani; Iran
Lightweight; 67 kg	Avtandil Koridze; Soviet Union	Imre Polyák; Hungary	Branislav Martinović; Yugoslavia
Welterweight; 73 kg	Valeriu Bularca; Romania	Stevan Horvat; Yugoslavia	Ziya Doğan; Turkey
Middleweight; 79 kg	Vasily Zenin; Soviet Union	Bertil Nyström; Sweden	Yavuz Selekman; Turkey
Light heavyweight 87 kg	György Gurics; Hungary	Arkady Tkachev; Soviet Union	Gheorghe Popovici; Romania
Heavyweight +87 kg	Ivan Bohdan; Soviet Union	Hamit Kaplan; Turkey	István Kozma; Hungary
