= Mansour Mehdizadeh =

Iranian wrestler (born 1938)

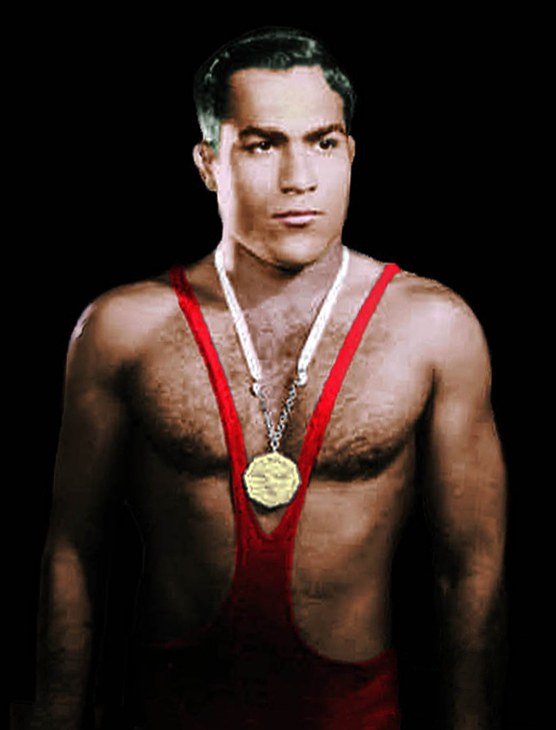
- Mehdi Zadeh in 1960s

Personal information
- Born: 14 August 1938 (age 88) Tehran, Iran
- Height: 195 cm (6 ft 5 in)

Sport
- Sport: Freestyle wrestling, koshti pahlavāni

Achievements and titles
- National finals: Pahlevan of Iran (2): 1341, 1344
Medal record
Representing Iran
World Championships
Gold medal – first place	1961 Yokohama	79 kg
Gold medal – first place	1962 Toledo	87 kg
Gold medal – first place	1965 Manchester	87 kg
Bronze medal – third place	1963 Sofia	87 kg
Asian Games
Gold medal – first place	1966 Bangkok	97 kg

Mansour Mehdizadeh Savadabadi (Persian: منصور مهدى زاده سواد آبادی, born 14 August 1938) is an Iranian retired freestyle wrestler who won world titles in 1961, 1962, and 1965. He competed at the 1960, 1964 and 1968 Olympics with his best result being fourth place in 1964. He was a two-time Pahlevan of Iran, which is the nation's ultimate crown in traditional wrestling.

== Olympic results ==
1964 (as a men's freestyle 87 kg):

Round	Opponent	Сountry	Results	Penalties	Time
1	Géza Hollósi	(Hungary)	Won by Points	1
2	Dan Brand	(United States)	Draw	2
3	Rudolf Kobelt	(Switzerland)	Won by Points	1
4	Hasan Güngör	(Turkey)	Won by Points	1
5	Prodan Gardzhev	(Bulgaria)	Won by Points	1

Mansour Mehdizadeh placing fourth according to special criteria for determining the winner:

Rank	Athlete
1st place, gold medalist(s)	Prodan Gardzhev (BUL)
2nd place, silver medalist(s)	Hasan Güngör (TUR)
3rd place, bronze medalist(s)	Dan Brand (USA)
4	Mansour Mehdizadeh (IRI)

== Personal life ==
Mehdizadeh was a major in the Iranian Army. He married in March 1965. After retiring from competitions he worked as a national wrestling coach.
