= Thony Andenas =

French footballer (born 1974)

Thony Andenas (born 12 December 1974, in Villeneuve-Saint-Georges, France) is a French former professional footballer who played as a forward. He made 19 appearances and scored six goals in Ligue 2 for US Créteil-Lusitanos and Nîmes Olympique between 1992 and 2002. He now works as a supervisor in the school "instistion Stanislas" situated in Frejus in South of France.
