= Germano Caraffini =

Italian wrestler

Personal information
- Nationality: Italian
- Born: 4 May 1936 Genoa, Italy
- Died: 6 October 2011 (aged 75) Genoa, Italy

Sport
- Sport: Wrestling

Germano Caraffini (4 May 1936 – 6 October 2011) was an Italian wrestler. He competed in the men's freestyle middleweight at the 1960 Summer Olympics.
