= 1962 World Wrestling Championships =

- Host city: Toledo, United States
- Dates: 21–27 June 1962

Champions
- Freestyle: Soviet Union
- Greco-Roman: Soviet Union

The 1962 World Wrestling Championships were held in Toledo, Ohio from 21 to 27 June 1962.

== Medal table ==
Rank	Nation	Gold	Silver	Bronze	Total
1	Soviet Union	6	4	11	21
2	Turkey	3	1	5	9
3	Japan	2	2	1	5
4	Iran	2	2	0	4
5	Hungary	2	0	1	3
6	Bulgaria	1	4	0	5
7	Italy	0	1	1	2
8	Denmark	0	1	0	1
8	Yugoslavia	0	1	0	1
10	United States	0	0	3	3
10	West Germany	0	0	3	3
12	United Arab Republic	0	0	1	1
Totals (12 entries)		16	16	26	58

== Team ranking ==
Rank	Men's freestyle		Men's Greco-Roman	
Rank	Team	Points	Team	Points
1	Soviet Union	29	Soviet Union	40
2	Japan	26.5	Turkey	31
3	Iran	25	Bulgaria	20.5
4	Turkey	21.5	Hungary	16
5	Bulgaria	19	West Germany	8.5
6	United States	15	Japan	8

== Medal summary ==
=== Freestyle ===
Event	Gold	Silver	Bronze
Flyweight; 52 kg	Ali Aliev; Soviet Union	Noriyuki Harada; Japan	Satılmış Tektaş; Turkey
Bantamweight; 57 kg	Hüseyin Akbaş; Turkey	Masaaki Hatta; Japan	János Varga; Hungary
Featherweight; 63 kg	Osamu Watanabe; Japan	Mohammad Khadem; Iran	Ewald Tauer; West Germany
Lightweight; 70 kg	Enyu Valchev; Bulgaria	Robert Dzhgamadze; Soviet Union	Osvaldo Ferrari; Italy
Welterweight; 78 kg	Emam-Ali Habibi; Iran	Petko Dermendzhiev; Bulgaria	James Ferguson; United States
Middleweight; 87 kg	Mansour Mehdizadeh; Iran	Hasan Güngör; Turkey	Shunichi Kawano; Japan
Light heavyweight 97 kg	Aleksandr Medved; Soviet Union	Gholamreza Takhti; Iran	Daniel Brand; United States
Heavyweight +97 kg	Aleksandr Ivanitsky; Soviet Union	Lyutvi Ahmedov; Bulgaria	Wilfried Dietrich; West Germany

=== Greco-Roman ===
Event	Gold	Silver	Bronze
Flyweight; 52 kg	Sergey Rybalko; Soviet Union	Ignazio Fabra; Italy	Burhan Bozkurt; Turkey
Bantamweight; 57 kg	Masamitsu Ichiguchi; Japan	Omari Egadze; Soviet Union	Kamal El-Sayed Ali; United Arab Republic
Featherweight; 63 kg	Imre Polyák; Hungary	Konstantin Vyrupaev; Soviet Union	Rıza Doğan; Turkey
Lightweight; 70 kg	Kazım Ayvaz; Turkey	Stevan Horvat; Yugoslavia	James Burke; United States
Welterweight; 78 kg	Anatoly Kolesov; Soviet Union	Bjarne Ansbøl; Denmark	Yavuz Selekman; Turkey
Middleweight; 87 kg	Tevfik Kış; Turkey	Krali Bimbalov; Bulgaria	Anatoly Kirov; Soviet Union
Light heavyweight 97 kg	Rostom Abashidze; Soviet Union	Boyan Radev; Bulgaria	İsmet Atlı; Turkey
Heavyweight +97 kg	István Kozma; Hungary	Anatoly Roshchin; Soviet Union	Wilfried Dietrich; West Germany
