= János Varga =

Hungarian wrestler (1939–2022)

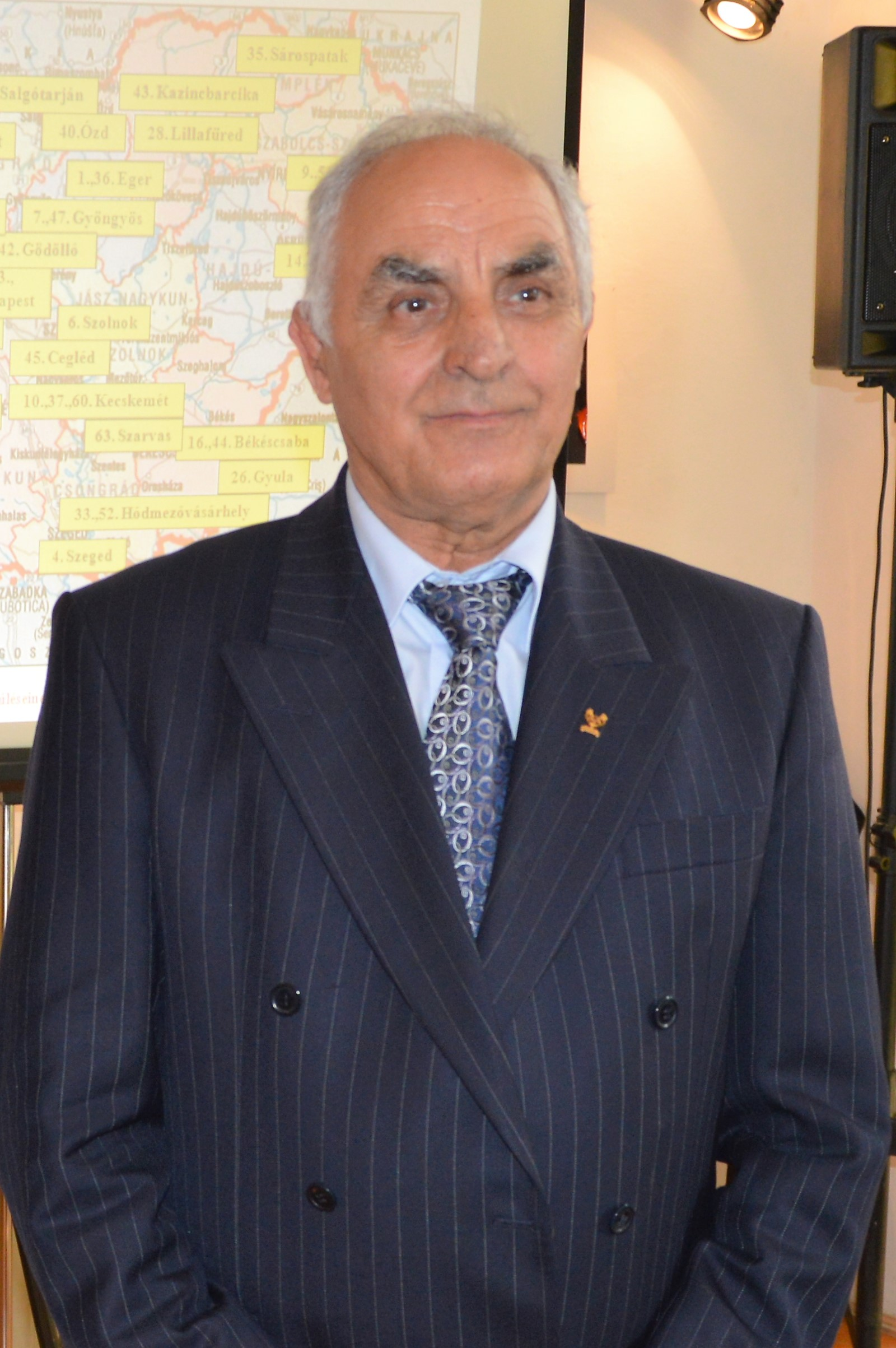

Personal information
- Born: 21 October 1939 Abony, Hungary
- Died: 29 December 2022 (aged 83) Budapest, Hungary

Sport
- Sport: Wrestling
Medal record
Representing Hungary
Men's Greco-Roman wrestling
Olympic Games
Gold medal – first place	1968 Mexico City	Bantamweight
World Championships
Men's Freestyle wrestling
Silver medal – second place	1961 Yokohama	Bantamweight
Bronze medal – third place	1962 Toledo	Bantamweight
Men's Greco-Roman Wrestling
Gold medal – first place	1963 Helsingborg	Bantamweight
Gold medal – first place	1970 Edmonton	Bantamweight
Silver medal – second place	1967 Bucharest	Bantamweight
Bronze medal – third place	1971 Sofia	Bantamweight

János Varga (21 October 1939 – 29 December 2022) was a Hungarian wrestler and both an Olympic champion and world champion in Greco-Roman wrestling.

== Olympics ==
Varga competed at the 1968 Summer Olympics in Mexico City where he received a gold medal in Greco-Roman wrestling in the bantamweight class.

== World championships ==
Varga won a gold medal in Greco-Roman wrestling at the 1963 FILA Wrestling World Championships, and again a gold medal in 1970. He received a silver medal in 1967, and a bronze medal in 1971.

Varga received a silver medal in Freestyle wrestling at the 1961 FILA Wrestling World Championships and a bronze medal at the 1962 FILA Wrestling World Championships.
