= Kornwestheim =

- Town
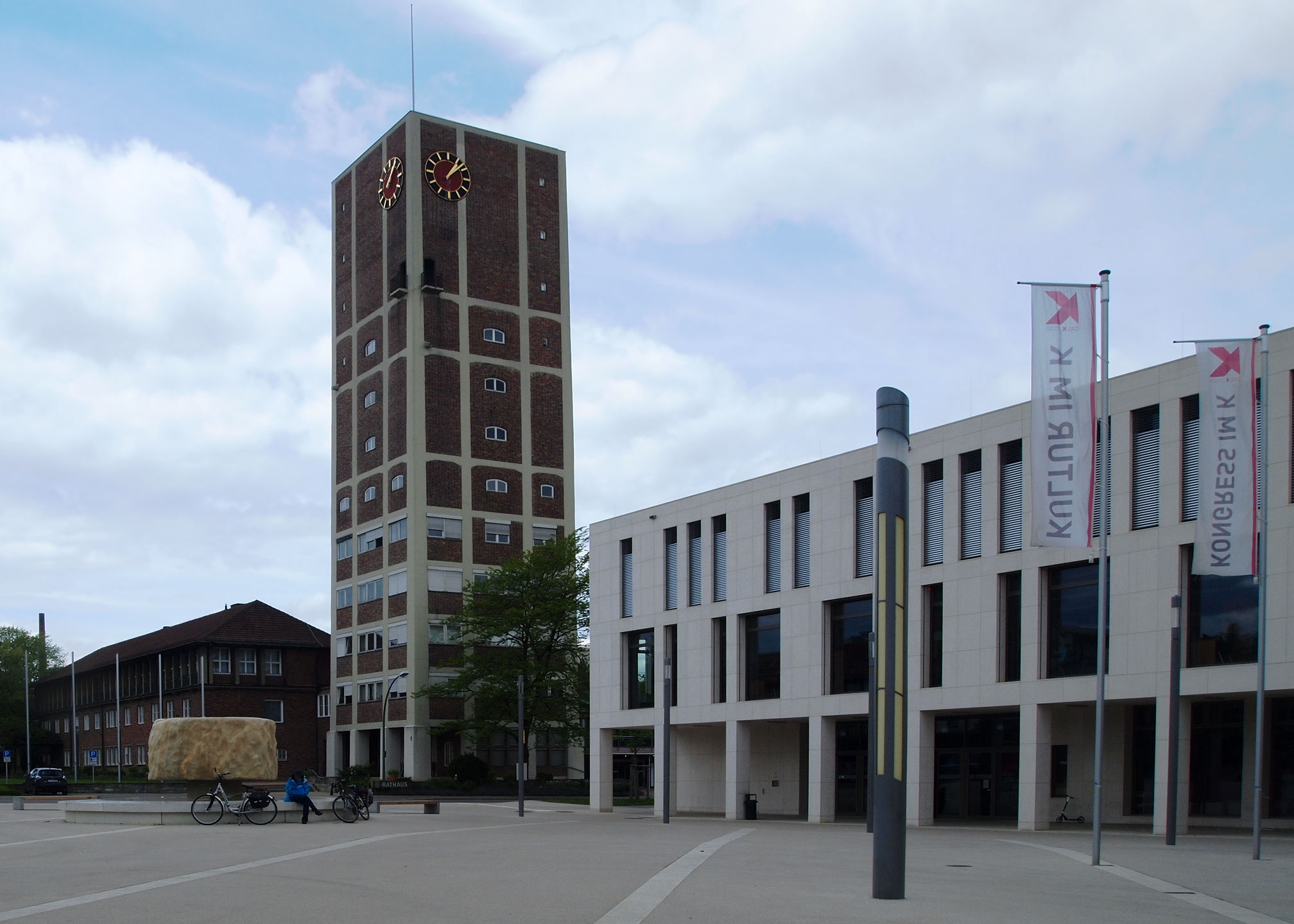
- Townhall and congress centre

- Coat of arms

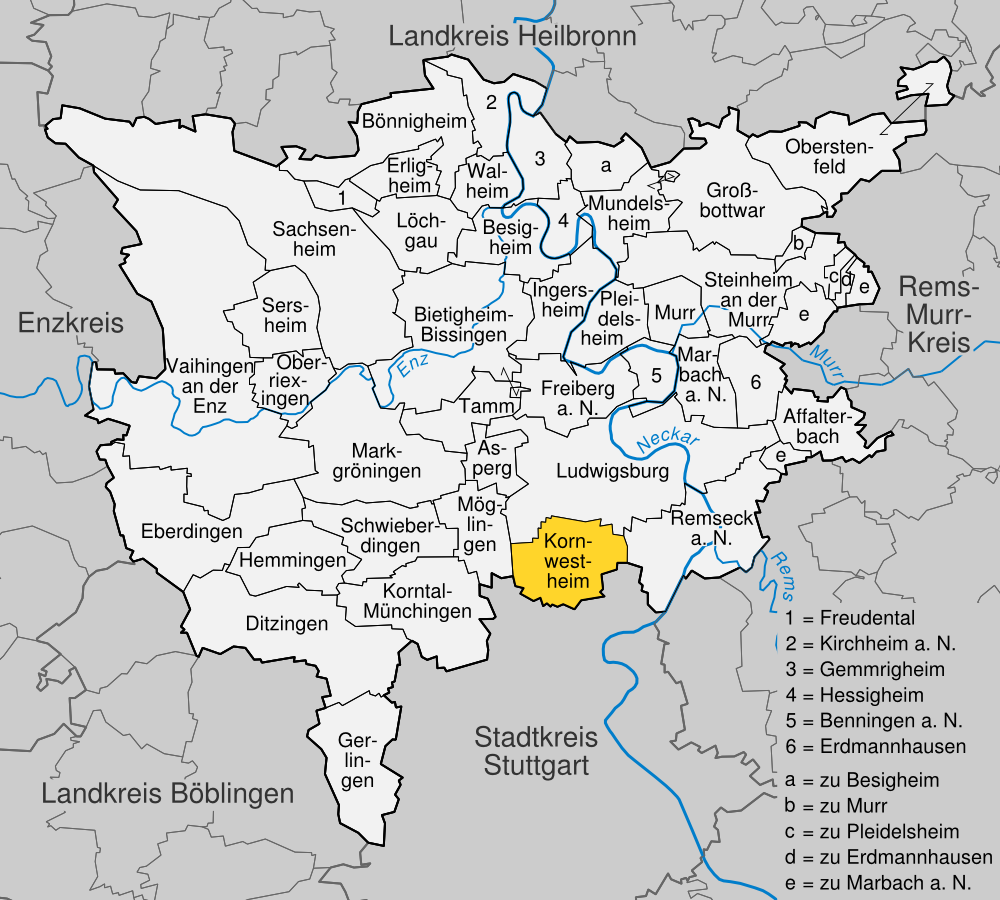
- Location of Kornwestheim within Ludwigsburg district
- Interactive map of Kornwestheim
- Location within Germany Location within Baden-Württemberg
- Coordinates: 48°51′35″N 9°11′07″E
- Country: Germany
- State: Baden-Württemberg
- Admin. region: Stuttgart
- District: Ludwigsburg

Government
  - Mayor (2023–31): Nico Lauxmann (CDU)

Area
  - Total: 14.65 km^{2} (5.66 sq mi)
- Elevation: 297 m (974 ft)

Population (2025-12-31)
  - Total: 34,149
  - Density: 2,331/km^{2} (6,037/sq mi)
- Time zone: UTC+01:00 (CET)
  - Summer (DST): UTC+02:00 (CEST)
- Postal codes: 70797–70806
- Dialling codes: 07154
- Vehicle registration: LB
- Website: www.kornwestheim.de

Kornwestheim (German pronunciation: [kɔʁnˈvɛsthaɪm]; Swabian: Kornweschte) is a town in the district of Ludwigsburg, Baden-Württemberg, Germany. It is situated about 10 kilometres (6 miles) north of Stuttgart, and 5 kilometres (3 miles) south of Ludwigsburg.

== History ==
=== Origins and development ===
Kornwestheim's history spans over 1200 years, first being documented as "Westheim" around 780 AC, within the interest register of the Lorsch monastery. The name form "Kornwestheim" appeared much later; for the first in 1472, which became common in the 17th century and has been in use ever since.

Archeological findings furnish evidence for the populating of the area in already prehistorical times. There was a Roman road that lead through the Kornwestheim urban area, which has been partially preserved as dirt road. Part of it was restored in Kornwestheim-Ost near the Theodor-Heuss-Realschule. In the western part of the city there was an even older road from the Bronze Age running towards what today is a highway.

It is assumed that the original Westheim is a western settlement, in contrast to the eastern settlement of Ostheim. For centuries, Kornwestheim was a prosperous and wealthy farming village that benefited from the fertility of its farmland and active trade. In 1303, the counts of Asperg sold Kornwestheim to the Dukes of Württemberg. At first, it belonged to the bureau of Cannstatt and since 1719 to the bureau of Ludwigsburg out of which emerged the county in 1938 and in 1973 the larger district of Ludwigsburg.

=== Urbanization in the mid-19th century ===
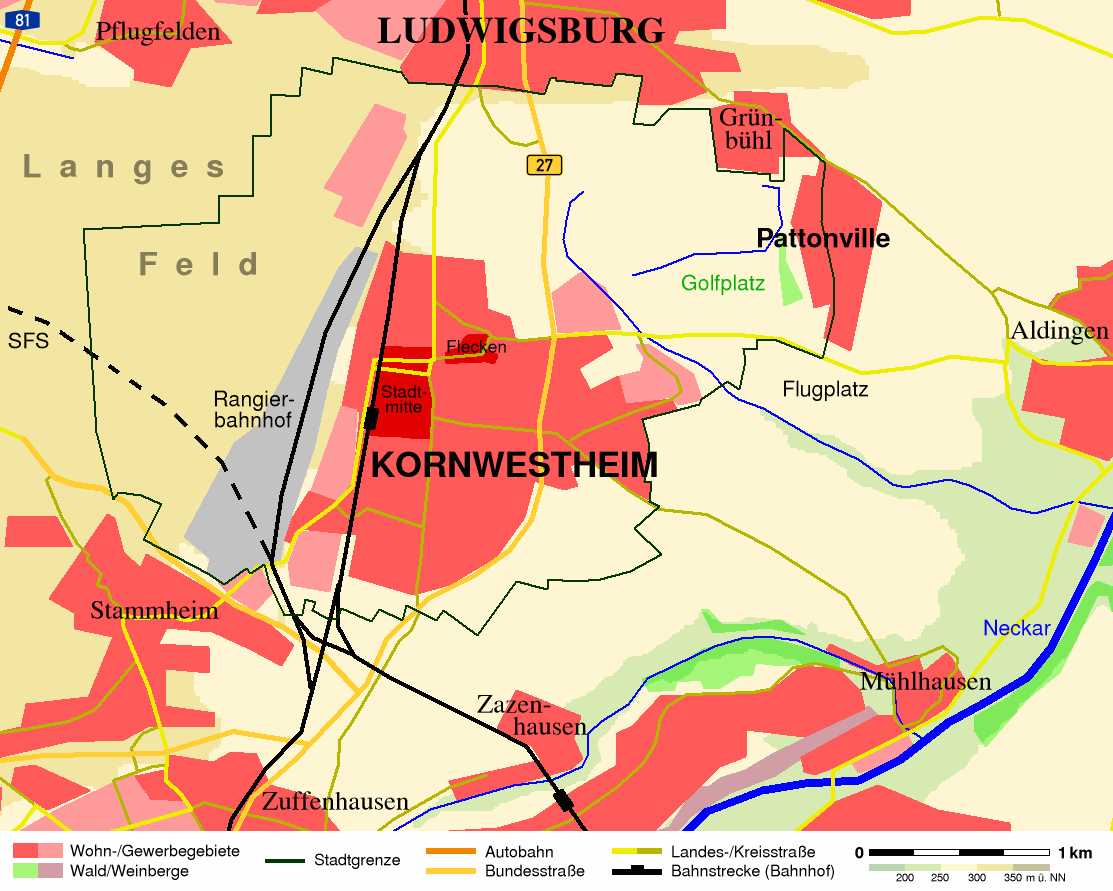
Map of the city area

With the construction of the railroad line Stuttgart – Ludwigsburg – Heilbronn in 1846 the era of Industrialization began and the construction of the national switch yard in Kornwestheim in the years of 1913–1919 made Kornwestheim the railway road node in Southern Germany, creating ideal conditions for the future growth and development of the city. This infrastructure improvements and the convenient location of the city as well as several factory foundations contributed to a large increase in population in the late 19th century. The shoemaker Jakob Sigle, who had already opened his workshop in 1885, founded the shoe factory J. Sigle & Cie. together with his merchant partner Max Levi, which later became nationally known as the Salamander AG. In 1898, the machine factory A. Stotz Albert Stotz followed as well as the iron foundry firm Kreidler, opening operations in 1939. As of April 1, when the population had nearly within the last three decades, Kornwestheim eventually received the official municipal law in 1931.

As part of the rearmament of the German re-armament, starting in 1934 the Hindenburg barracks and the Ludendorff barracks were built as tank units and Kornwestheim became a garrison town in 1935/36. The Second World War demanded numerous victims: allied air raids killed 162 people and destroyed 160 buildings. At the military front 478 resident soldiers were killed. On April 21, 1945, the US troops took over the occupation using the existing barracks until 1993 and renamed the Hindenburg barracks into Wilkin Barracks. Since the Second World War the population has doubled due to the influx of exiles and guest workers. This resulted in an increased growth and designation of new living and commercial districts. On April 1, 1956, Kornwestheim became a large district town. Due to its location between the cities of Stuttgart and Ludwigsburg, the city was unable to incorporate neighboring communities during the 1973 regional reform. Only the restructuring undertaken by the US Army in 1954 added a new district called Pattonville to the city, although the eastern, larger part of Pattonville now belongs to the town of Remseck am Neckar.

== Mayor ==
At the head of the municipality Kornwestheim was a Schultheiß. Since 1930 he is called mayor and since 1956 Lord mayor.

- 1793–1814: Johann Georg Sigle
- 1815–1823: Jakob Friedrich Sigle
- 1823–1840: Jakob Friedrich Ergenzinger
- 1841–1855: Christoph Richt
- 1855–1877: Thomas Hofmann
- 1877–1887: Georg Mayer
- 1887–1892: Karl Sigle
- 1892–1902: Adolf Voelmle
- 1902–1930: Friedrich Siller
- 1930–1931: Theodor Steimle
- 1931–1933: Friedrich Siller, temporary administrator
- 1933–1945: Alfred Kercher, 1933 initially as temporary administrator
- 1945: Gotthilf Küntzle,
- 1945–1948: Friedrich Warthmann, 1945–1946
- 1948–1954: Nathanael Schulz
- 1954–1962: Alfred Kercher
- 1962–1982: Siegfried Pflugfeld
- 1982–1999: Ernst Fischer
- 1999–2007: Ulrich Rommelfanger
- 2007–2023: Ursula Keck
- since 2023: Nico Lauxmann

== Transport ==
At the western edge of Kornwestheim is the Kornwestheim classification yard, which is the second largest of Baden-Württemberg. Up to 1600 freight cars are daily put together to freight trains.

== Media ==
A newspaper appears in Kornwestheim, the Kornwestheimer Zeitung.

== Local authorities and councils ==
Kornwestheim has a notary. In the city is the Landesamt für Flurneuordnung und Landesentwicklung Baden-Württemberg. On the former Salamander area is since March 21, 2012, the Baden-Württemberg Grundbuchzentralarchiv.

== Entertainment ==
The Kornwestheim Drive-In Cinema is the only drive-in cinema in Baden-Wuerttemberg. It lies in the town of the same name in the Ludwigsburg district and is well known outside the region. It has two projection walls; these are 15 metres (49 ft) high by 36 metres (118 ft) wide, and 10 metres (33 ft) high by 24 metres (79 ft) wide. For sound, the Kornwestheim Drive-In Cinema has two FM-transmitters which work on 89 MHz for the sound of the film shown on the big projection wall, and on 91.3 MHz for the sound of the film shown on the small projection wall. The light intensity of the projectors used is 6 Kilowatts.

== Local companies ==
- Kreidler Werke GmbH

The well known small motorcycle and moped manufacturer Kreidler was situated here. It was founded in 1903 by Anton Kreidler and was at first a metalworking factory. Later in the 1950s they started producing small motorcycles with an engine capacity of 50 cc. In the later 1970s they became successful in Grand Prix motorcycle racing. Riders such as Jan de Vries and Henk van Kessel won world championships and set speed records with these machines.

== Twin towns – sister cities ==
Kornwestheim is twinned with:

- Eastleigh, England, United Kingdom
- Kimry, Russia
- Villeneuve-Saint-Georges, France
- Weißenfels, Germany

== Notable people ==
- Jakob Vogel (born 1584), physician and writer
- Jakob Sigle (1861–1935), founder of the shoe factory Salamander AG
- Walter Maier-Kößler (1914–1994), painter
- Günther C. Kirchberger (1928–2010), painter
- Georg Utz (born 1935), wrestler
- Roland Geiger (born 1941), screen printers, publishers and art gallery owner
- Anneke Dürkopp (born 1979), presenter
- Joerg Michael Schaefer (born 1968), climate scientist and cosmogenic isotope expert

=== Honorary citizens ===
The town Kornwestheim has conferred to the following persons the honorary citizenship:

- 1896: Hugo von Baur, Colonel and commander of the Landwehr District Ludwigsburg
- 1916: Jakob Sigle, Privy Councillor of Commerce, Founder of Salamander AG
- 1916: Max Levi, Consul, co-founder of Salamander AG
- 1927: Ernst Sigle, Honorary Chairman of Salamander AG
- 1927: Isidor Rothschild (1860–1929), the Management and Supervisory Board of Salamander AG
- 1930: Friedrich Siller, Schultheiss
- 1950: Karl Joos, founder of the District Cooperative Altwürttemberg
- 1963: Alfred Kercher, Mayor retired
- 1970: Marius Faisse, mayor of the twin town Villeneuve-Saint-Georges
- 1989: Siegfried Pflugfelder, Mayor ret.
- 2004: Ernst Fischer, Mayor ret.
- 2011: Siegbert Hörer, local politician
