= Alan Butts =

British wrestler

Personal information
- Nationality: British (English)
- Born: 11 April 1940 (age 86) Birmingham, England
- Height: 172 cm (5 ft 8 in)
- Weight: 79 kg (174 lb)

Sport
- Sport: Wrestling
- Club: Birmingham Athletic Institute

Alan Butts (born 11 April 1940) is a British wrestler. He competed in the men's freestyle middleweight at the 1960 Summer Olympics.

Butts was the British champion after winning the 1960 middleweight title at the British Wrestling Championships.
