= Georg Utz =

German wrestler (born 1935)

Personal information
- Nationality: German
- Born: August 22, 1935 Kornwestheim, Germany
- Died: December 25, 2019 (aged 84)

Sport
- Sport: Wrestling

Georg Utz (born 22 August 1935) is a German former wrestler. He competed in the men's freestyle middleweight at the 1960 Summer Olympics.
