= Theunis van Wyk =

Zambian wrestler

Personal information
- Nationality: Northern Rhodesian
- Born: 21 March 1944 (age 82)

Sport
- Sport: Wrestling

Theunis G. van Wyk (born 21 March 1944) is a Zambian former wrestler. He competed in the men's freestyle middleweight at the 1964 Summer Olympics.
