= Günther Bauch =

German wrestler (born 1939)

Personal information
- Nationality: German
- Born: 30 April 1939 (age 87) Halle an der Saale, Germany

Sport
- Sport: Wrestling

Günther Bauch (born 30 April 1939) is a German wrestler. He competed in the men's freestyle middleweight at the 1964 Summer Olympics.
