= Hôtel de Ville, Villeneuve-Saint-Georges =

Town hall in Villeneuve-Saint-Georges, France

Hôtel de Ville
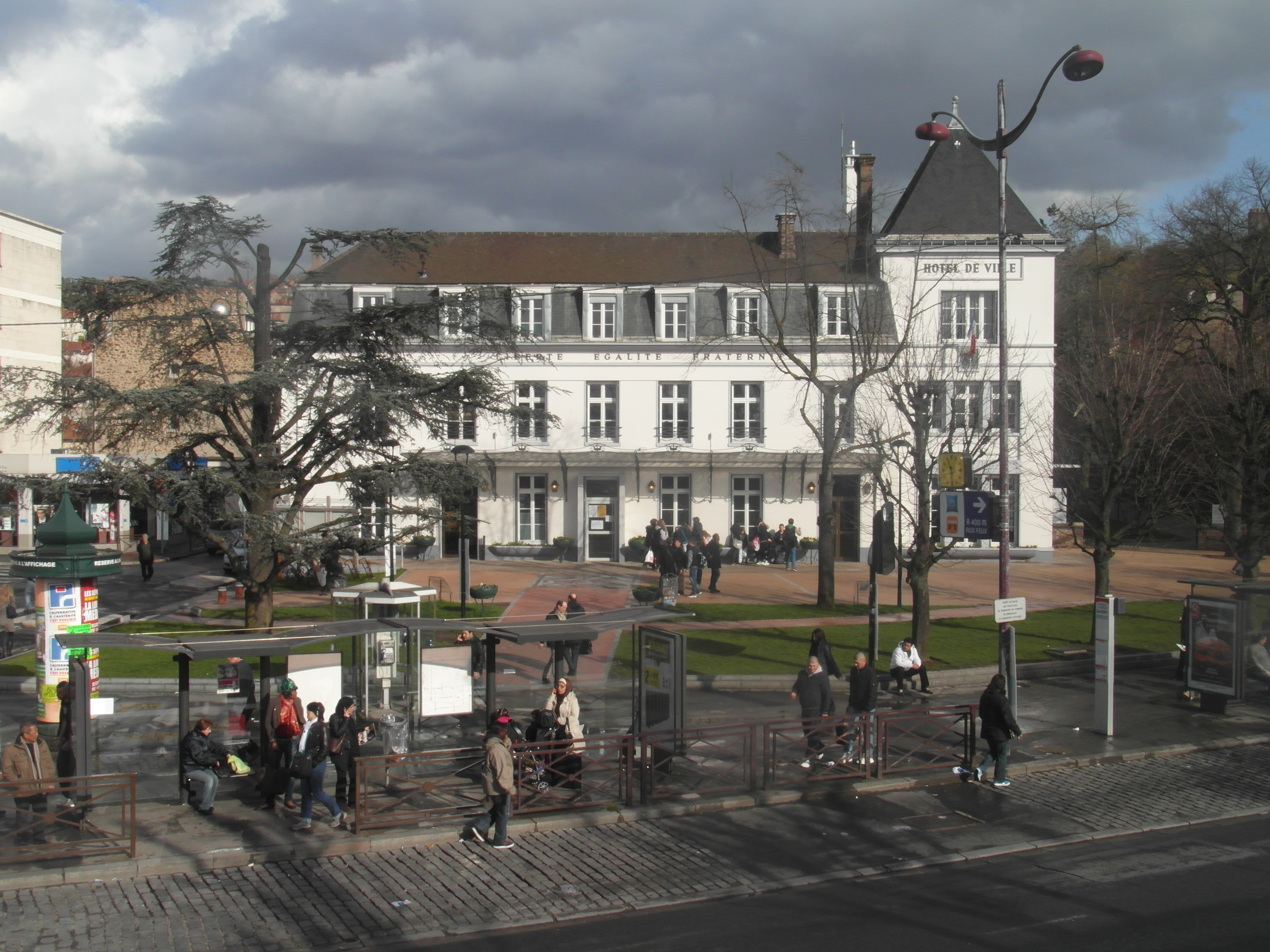
- The main frontage of the Hôtel de Ville in April 2013
- Interactive map of the Hôtel de Ville area

General information
- Type: City hall
- Architectural style: Neoclassical style
- Location: Villeneuve-Saint-Georges, France
- Coordinates: 48.7307°N 2.4477°E
- Completed: 1773

The Hôtel de Ville (French pronunciation: [otɛl də vil], City Hall) is a municipal building in Villeneuve-Saint-Georges, Val-de-Marne, in the southern suburbs of Paris, standing on Place Pierre Sémard. It has been included on the Inventaire général des monuments by the French Ministry of Culture since 1982.

== History ==
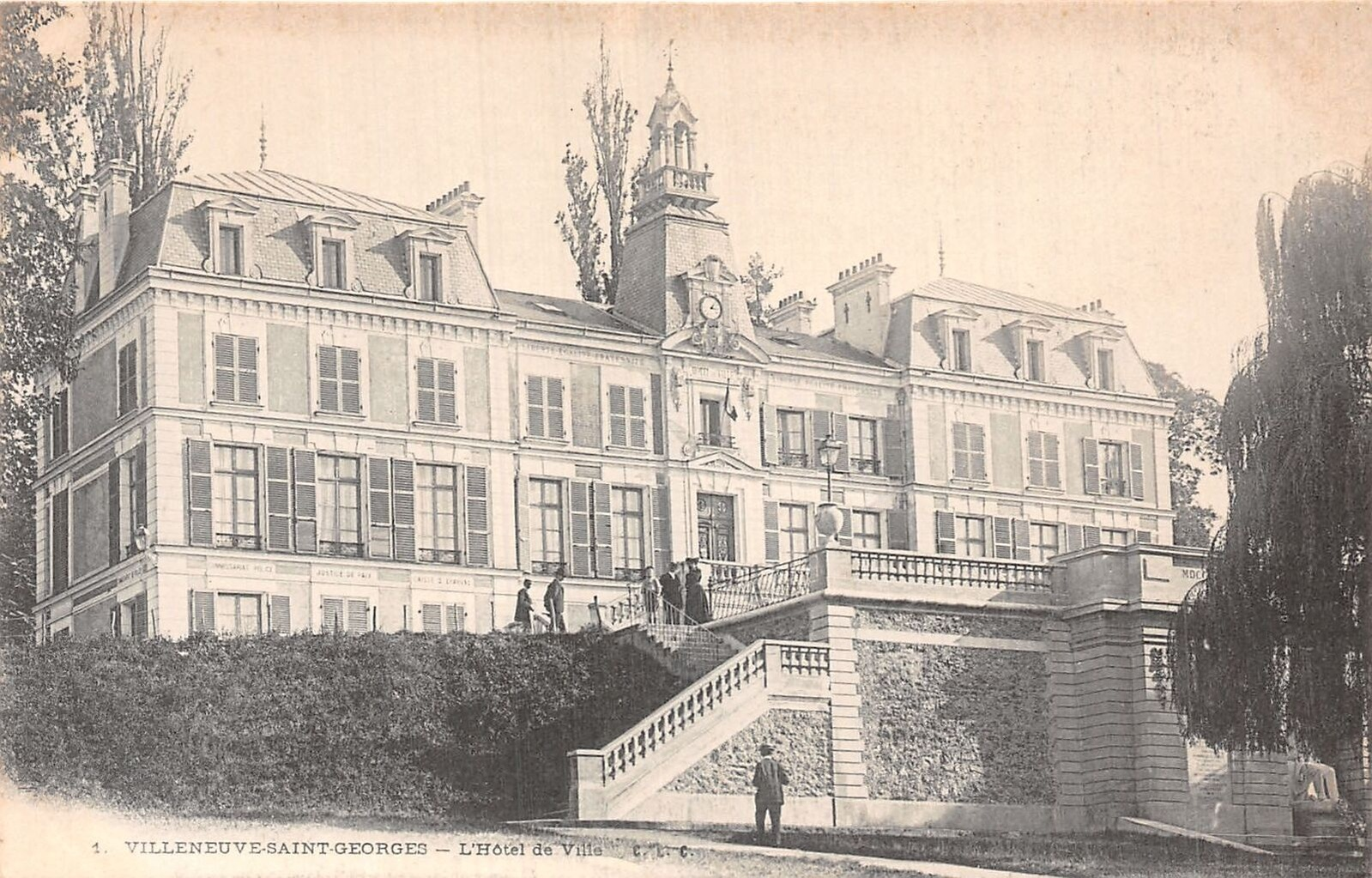
Château de Beauregard

Following the French Revolution, the town council initially met in the home of the mayor at the time. This arrangement continued until the late 19th century, when the council decided to acquire a dedicated building. The building they selected was the Château de Beauregard on Avenue de la République. This building was commissioned by Sieur Tranchard, who was the mayor of the 4th arrondissement. It was designed in the neoclassical style, built in brick with a cement render finish and was completed in 1827.

The château was located on the side of a hill and was surrounded by a large park. The design involved a symmetrical main frontage of 11 bays facing down the hill with the last three bays at either end projected forward as pavilions. The central bay, which was slightly projected forward, featured an external forestair leading up to a doorway with voussoirs and a pediment on the first floor. There was a casement window on the first floor which was flanked by pilasters supporting an entablature, a cornice, a segmental pediment and a clock. Behind the clock, there was a steep châteauesque roof surmounted by a belfry and a weather vane. The other bays were fenestrated by casement windows with shutters. The council moved into the building in 1896 and, after the building was no longer required for municipal use, it was converted into a retirement home.

In the early 20th century, the council decided to acquire a more substantial property. The building they selected, on what is now Place Pierre Sémard, had been conceived as a stable block. It formed part of a larger complex erected around a hunting lodge commissioned by King Louis XVI in the 18th century.

The building was designed in the neoclassical style, built in brick with a cement render and was completed in 1773. It was seized by the state during the French Revolution and then used for meetings of the Council of the National Guard. In the mid-19th century, it then became the home of the mayor, Félix Cottreau, who would have held council meetings there. The family had a large art collection which was sold in 1870, and, following Félix's death, the family demolished much of the complex in 1886. The council took ownership of the building in 1911.

The design of the surviving building involved an asymmetrical main frontage of eight bays facing onto what is now Place Pierre Sémard. The main frontage was formed by a main block of seven bays, with a three-stage tower at the right-hand end. There were three doorways on the ground floor of the main block; it was fenestrated by casement windows in the other bays on the ground floor, by casement windows in all the bays on the first floor, and by dormer windows at attic level. The tower was fenestrated by tri-partite windows in the first two stages and by a single casement window in the third stage and was surmounted by a pyramid-shaped roof. Internally, the principal room was the Salle du Conseil (council chamber).

During the Second World War, a local political activist, Pierre Semard, was arrested on account of his communist sympathies, and taken to Évreux prison, where he was shot by German troops in March 1942. A plaque was subsequently installed on the front of the town hall to commemorate his life.
