= Henri Mottier =

Swiss wrestler

Personal information
- Nationality: Swiss
- Born: 5 June 1936 (age 90) Saxon, Switzerland

Sport
- Sport: Wrestling

Henri Mottier (born 5 June 1936) is a Swiss wrestler. He competed in the men's freestyle middleweight at the 1960 Summer Olympics.
