= Stevan Horvat =

Serbian wrestler (1932–2018)

Medal record

Men's Greco-Roman wrestling

Representing Yugoslavia

Olympic Games
Silver medal – second place	1968 Mexico City	Lightweight

World Championships
Gold medal – first place	1963 Helsingborg	Lightweight
Gold medal – first place	1966 Toledo	Lightweight
Silver medal – second place	1961 Yokohama	Welterweight
Silver medal – second place	1962 Toledo	Lightweight
Silver medal – second place	1965 Tampere	Lightweight

Mediterranean Games
Gold medal – first place	1959 Beirut	78kg
Gold medal – first place	1967 Tunis	70kg

Stevan Horvat (7 October 1932 – 28 May 2018) was a Serbian wrestler who competed in the 1960 Summer Olympics, in the 1964 Summer Olympics, and in the 1968 Summer Olympics. He was born in Svetozar Miletić.
