= Madho Singh (wrestler) =

Indian wrestler

Personal information
- Nationality: Indian
- Born: 1 July 1929 (age 96) Hoshiarpur district, India
- Died: 2006 (aged 76–77)

Sport
- Sport: Wrestling

Madho Singh (1 July 1929 – 2006) was an Indian wrestler. He competed at the 1960 Summer Olympics and the 1964 Summer Olympics.
