= Ed DeWitt =

American wrestler (1934–2022)

Personal information
- Born: June 9, 1934 Meadowlands, Minnesota, U.S.
- Died: February 11, 2022 (aged 87) Waynesburg, Pennsylvania, U.S.
- Home town: Washington, Pennsylvania, U.S.

Sport
- Country: United States
- Sport: Wrestling
- Events: Freestyle and Folkstyle
- College team: Pittsburgh
- Club: U.S. Army
- Team: USA
Medal record
Collegiate Wrestling
Representing the Pittsburgh Panthers
NCAA Championships
| Gold medal – first place | 1956 Stillwater | 167 lb |
| Bronze medal – third place | 1955 Ithaca | 157 lb |

Ed DeWitt (June 9, 1934 – February 11, 2022) was an American wrestler. He competed in the men's freestyle middleweight at the 1960 Summer Olympics. DeWitt wrestled collegiately for the University of Pittsburgh, where he was an NCAA champion and two-time All-American.
