= Tatsuo Sasaki (wrestler) =

Japanese wrestler (born 1942)

Tatsuo Sasaki (佐々木 竜雄, Sasaki Tatsuo; born 24 September 1942) is a Japanese former wrestler who competed in the 1964 Summer Olympics, in the 1968 Summer Olympics, and in the 1972 Summer Olympics.
