= Alfonso González (wrestler) =

Panamanian wrestler

Personal information
- Nationality: Panamanian
- Born: 3 October 1945 (age 80)

Sport
- Sport: Wrestling

Alfonso González (born 3 October 1945) is a Panamanian wrestler. He competed in the men's freestyle middleweight at the 1964 Summer Olympics.
