= Villeneuve-Saint-Georges =

- Commune
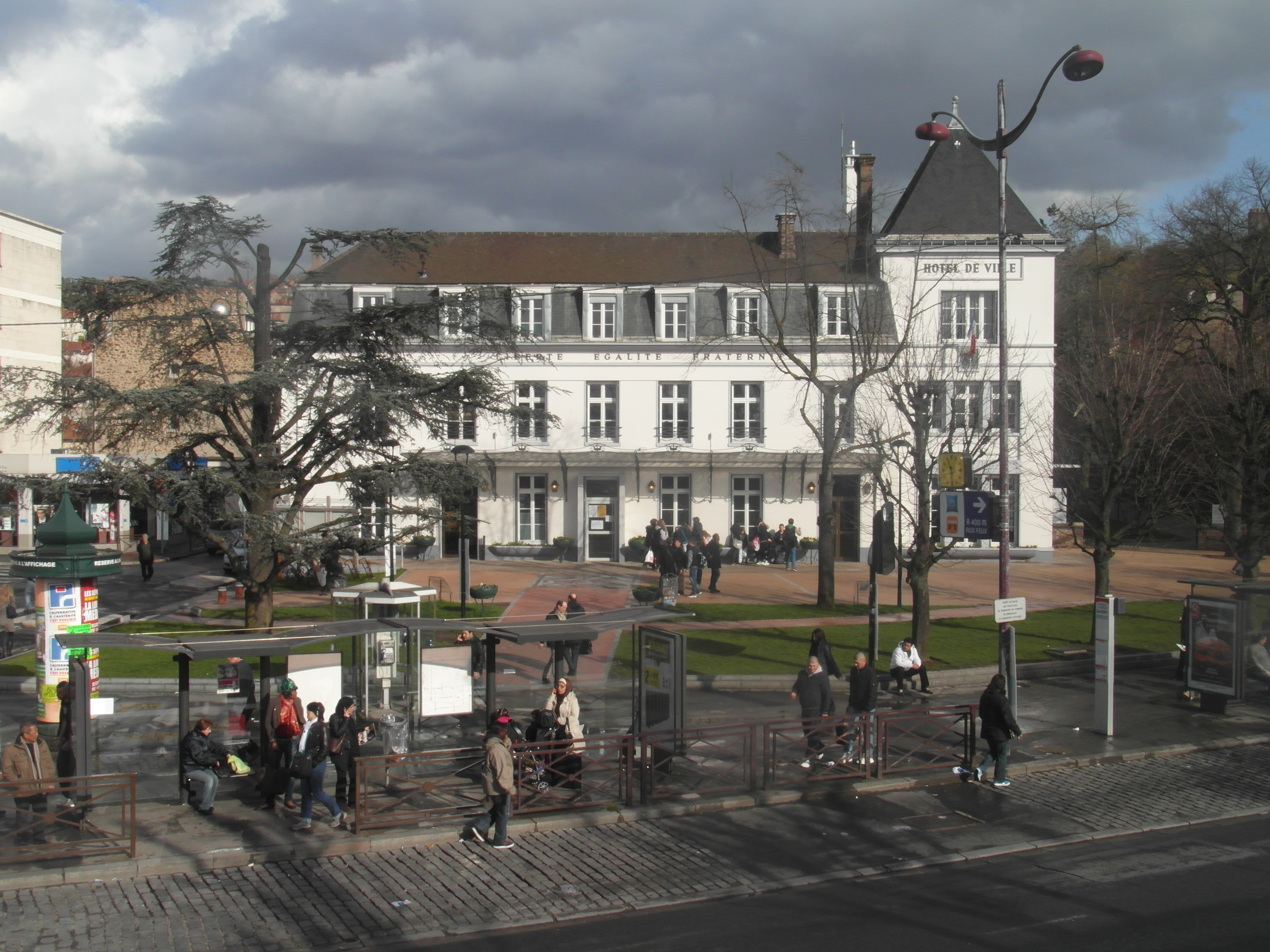
- The Hôtel de Ville

- Coat of arms

- Location (in red) within Paris inner suburbs
- Location of Villeneuve-Saint-Georges
- Location within France Location within Île-de-France (region)
- Coordinates: 48°43′57″N 2°26′59″E
- Country: France
- Region: Île-de-France
- Department: Val-de-Marne
- Arrondissement: L'Haÿ-les-Roses
- Canton: Villeneuve-Saint-Georges and Choisy-le-Roi
- Intercommunality: Grand Paris

Government
  - Mayor (2026–32): Kristell Niasme
- Area^{1}: 8.75 km^{2} (3.38 sq mi)
- Highest elevation: 93 m (305 ft)
- Lowest elevation: 30 m (98 ft)
- Population (2023): 36,221
  - Density: 4,140/km^{2} (10,700/sq mi)
- Time zone: UTC+01:00 (CET)
  - Summer (DST): UTC+02:00 (CEST)
- INSEE/Postal code: 94078 /94190
- ^{1} French Land Register data, which excludes lakes, ponds, glaciers > 1 km^{2} (0.386 sq mi or 247 acres) and river estuaries.

Villeneuve-Saint-Georges (French pronunciation: [vilnœv sɛ̃ ʒɔʁʒ]) is a commune in the southeastern suburbs of Paris, France. It is located 15.5 kilometres (9.6 miles) from the centre of Paris. People from Villeneuve-Saint-Georges are called Villeneuvois in French.

== History ==
=== Prehistory and Antiquity ===
Villeneuve-Saint-Georges was settled during the Paleolithic and the Neolithic ages at the meeting of the Yerres and the Seine rivers, as well at Triage, with evidence from archeological remains found by Francis Martin in the 19th century, which includes flints and some stone tools.

After the battle of Melun during the Roman Empire, the area was integrated into the Roman Empire. A small town was built around the area, with the name of Villa Nova (Latin for new house).

=== Middle Ages ===
In the Middle Ages, Villeneuve-Saint-Georges was a possession of the abbey of Saint-Germain-des-Prés. The addition of "Saint-Georges" in the name of the commune was after the remains of Saint George was brought back in AD 858. The strategic position on the road between Paris towards the cities of Melun, Clermont-Ferrand and Lyon made it a transport hub and wan regularly visited and traversed by kings and dukes. The importance of the towns led it to be plundered, raided and besieged many times, including during the Hundred Years' War.

The city mostly relied on farming and wine-making for income.

=== Renaissance and Modern Times ===
During the Siege of Paris in 1590, Captain Saint-Paul forced his way into Villeneuve-Saint-Georges and killed the 200-300 men under the name of Henry IV of France who were garrisoned there, whilst delivering food and assistance to the besieged people in Paris.

During the modern times, Villeneuve became a bourgeois city. Mansions, like the castles of Beauregard and Bellevue were built in the area, and people of the higher classes visited Villeneuve, like Henry IV of France, Catherine de' Medici and Mme of Sévigné.

In 1652, The Prince of Condé rebelled, and Charles IV sent Turenne to confront him. A battle took place between them in the area.

The Hôtel de Ville, commissioned as a hunting lodge for King Louis XVI, was completed in 1773.

=== Revolution and the 19th Century ===
During the Revolution, the national guard was created and the church was looted. Shortly after that Villeneuve became a quiet town again. Many people came to live in Villeneuve, including composers (Boieldieu), painters (Francesco Casanova, Karl Joseph Kuwasseg) naturalists (Charles Athanase Walckenaer), ministers (Victor Duruy), ceramists (Jean-Paul Louis Chesnel-Larossière), and ambassadors (Louis-Jules Mancini-Mazarini). Many personalities, such as Napoleon, Joachim Murat and Prince Eugène, also stopped in Villeneuve. In 1876, Fort Villeneuve was built to protect Paris in anticipation of a future war. The establishment of the railway in 1847 transformed the city, with the agricultural village very quickly became a working-class town.

=== 20th Century ===
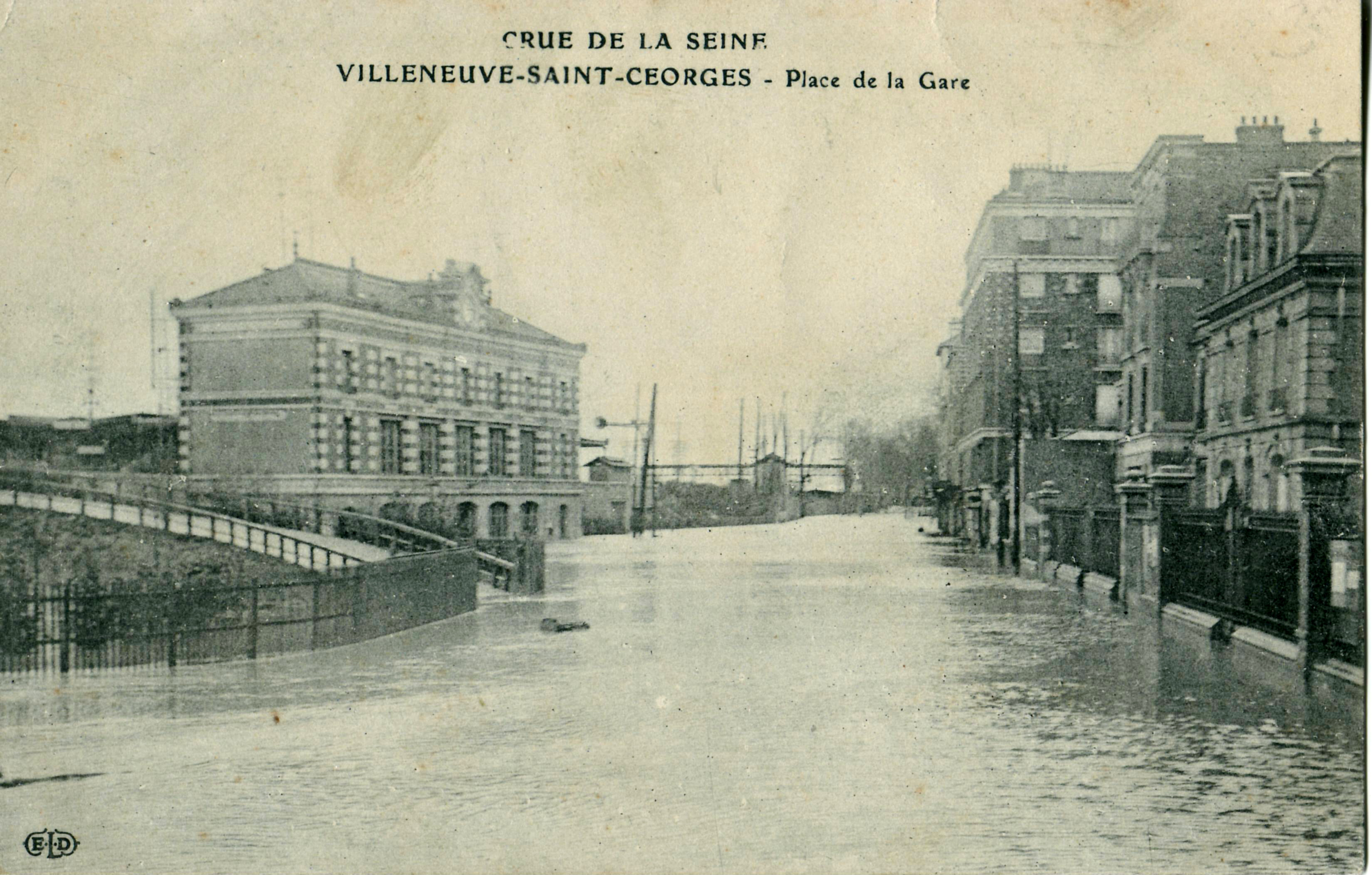
The front gate of Villeneuve Saint Georges station, flooded during the 1910 Great Flood of Paris.

On the eve of the First World War, Villeneuve-Saint-Georges had more than 10,000 inhabitants. It was the first railway town in the country with the largest sorting in Europe. The Foyer and HBM sets were built at this time.

On 30 July 1908, following the calls for a 24-hour general strike launched by the General Confederation of Labour to demand a 10-hour day, weekly rest, a salary increase and the end of Piece work, thousands of demonstrators gathered in Vigneux-sur-Seine and Draveil, then converged in the town where a violent confrontation took place between the National Gendarmerie and the workers. The result fight left four dead and more than 200 injured among the workers, and 69 injured on the side of the forces of order. A local odonym ("Place du 30-Juillet-1908") recalls these events. The next day, Georges Clemenceau ordered the arrest of thirty leaders of the CGT, including its general secretary Victor Griffuelhes, to neutralize the union.

A painting by Théodore Rousseau, titled La Seine à Villeneuve-Saint-Georges, which was in the Palais des Beaux-Arts in Lille was destroyed in 1916.

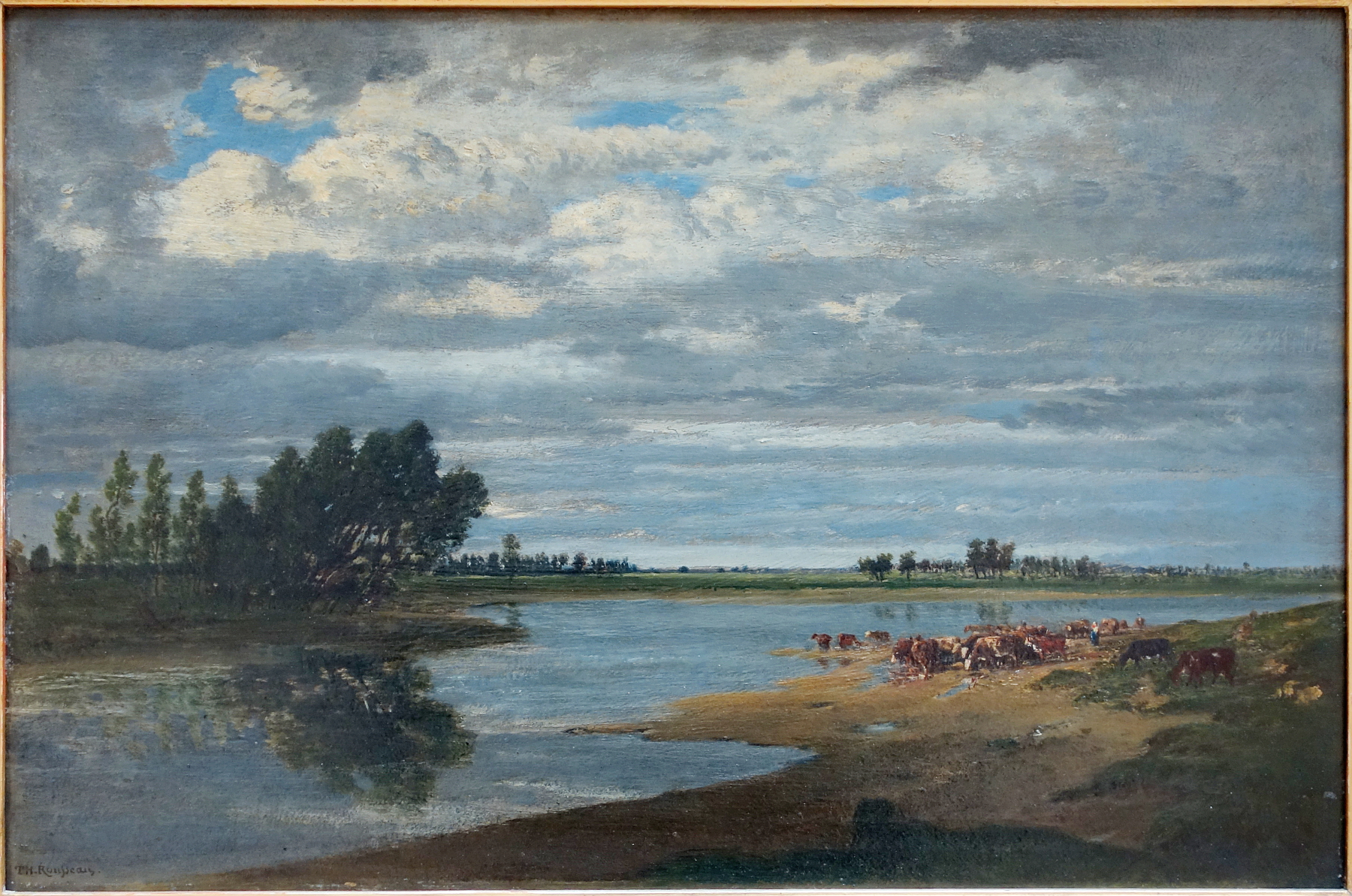
La Seine à Villeneuve-Saint-Georges Théodore Rousseau (1812-1867)

During the First World War, Villeneuve-Saint-Georges hosted the 232nd Territorial Infantry Regiment (normally quartered in Argentan). The school hospital becomes the Auxiliary Hospital of the Military Wounded Relief Society (HASSBM) No.42, while the Ferry School Group becomes the Auxiliary Hospital of the Ladies of France Association (HAADF) No.248.

A train derailment on 30 July 1937 killed 29 people and injured 111 others at the junction between the Brunoy and Corbeil lines. The accident happened soon after the introduction of paid leave in France and many of the victims were traveling on vacation.

During the Second World War, the city was bombarded by Allied aircraft because the Wehrmacht used the railway installations. Many resistance fighters are also killed after the "Triage sabotage". After these events, a new demographic surge saw the construction of large housing estates in the North part of Villeneuve.

On 1 January 1968, Villeneuve-Saint-Georges, which until then had been part of the department of Seine-et-Oise, became one of the municipalities of the new Val-de-Marne.

== Transport ==
Villeneuve-Saint-Georges is served by two stations on Paris RER line D: Villeneuve-Triage and Villeneuve-Saint-Georges. The commune is also home to the 170 ha (420 acres) Villeneuve-Saint-Georges marshalling yard.

The Route nationale 6 cuts through the commune and runs parallel to the RER line.

In December 2025, Câble 1 opened as the first cable car line in the Grand Paris region, connecting the Bois Matar district with the Pointe du Lac station on Paris Métro Line 8 in Créteil.

== Demography ==
Historical population

Year	Pop.	±% p.a.
1793	1,088	—
1800	939	−2.08%
1806	964	+0.44%
1821	953	−0.08%
1831	1,090	+1.35%
1836	1,083	−0.13%
1841	1,035	−0.90%
1846	1,071	+0.69%
1851	1,069	−0.04%
1856	1,031	−0.72%
1861	1,069	+0.73%
1866	1,758	+10.46%
1872	1,627	−1.28%
1876	2,262	+8.59%
1881	2,588	+2.73%
1886	4,315	+10.77%
1891	5,193	+3.77%
1896	6,485	+4.54%
1901	8,178	+4.75%

Year	Pop.	±% p.a.
1906	9,661	+3.39%
1911	11,393	+3.35%
1921	14,034	+2.11%
1926	16,477	+3.26%
1931	19,625	+3.56%
1936	21,237	+1.59%
1946	18,299	−1.48%
1954	21,596	+2.09%
1962	28,091	+3.34%
1968	30,467	+1.36%
1975	31,664	+0.55%
1982	28,119	−1.68%
1990	26,952	−0.53%
1999	28,361	+0.57%
2007	30,609	+0.96%
2012	32,994	+1.51%
2017	33,545	+0.33%
2023	36,221	+1.29%

Source: EHESS and INSEE (1968-2023)

== Education ==
The commune is served by multiple primary schools.

Secondary schools:

- Three junior high schools: Collège Pierre-Brossolette, Collège Jules-Ferry, Collège Roland-Garros
- One senior high school: Lycée François Arago

== Twin towns – sister cities ==
Villeneuve-Saint-Georges is twinned with:

- Eastleigh, England, United Kingdom
- Kornwestheim, Germany

== Notable people ==
- Jérémy Cordoval, footballer
- Jacques Faty, footballer
- Ricardo Faty, French-Senegalese footballer
- Georges Grignard, racing driver
- Yoan Gouffran, footballer
- Maxence Lacroix, footballer
- Geoffrey Lembet, French-Central African footballer
- Gérard Pussey, writer
- Therry Racon, footballer
- Louna Ribadeira, footballer
- MC Solaar, hip hop and rap artist
- Mickaël Tavares, French-Senegalese footballer
- Patrick Pelloux, emergency physician
- Cécile Duflot, member of French National Assembly for Paris and Minister of Housing in 2012–2014
- Niska, hip hop and rap artist
- Lucas Gourna-Douath, footballer

== See also ==
- Communes of the Val-de-Marne department
