= Fred Thomas (wrestler) =

New Zealand wrestler

Medal record

Men's wrestling

Representing New Zealand

British Empire and Commonwealth Games
Bronze medal – third place	1962 Perth	82 kg

Frederick Arthur Thomas (born 14 September 1938) is a former wrestler from New Zealand.

He competed at the 1962 British Empire and Commonwealth Games where he won the bronze medal in the men's 82 kg (middleweight) grade.

Thomas competed at the 1960 Summer Olympics in the men's middleweight event.
