= Hans Antonsson =

Swedish wrestler (1934–2021)

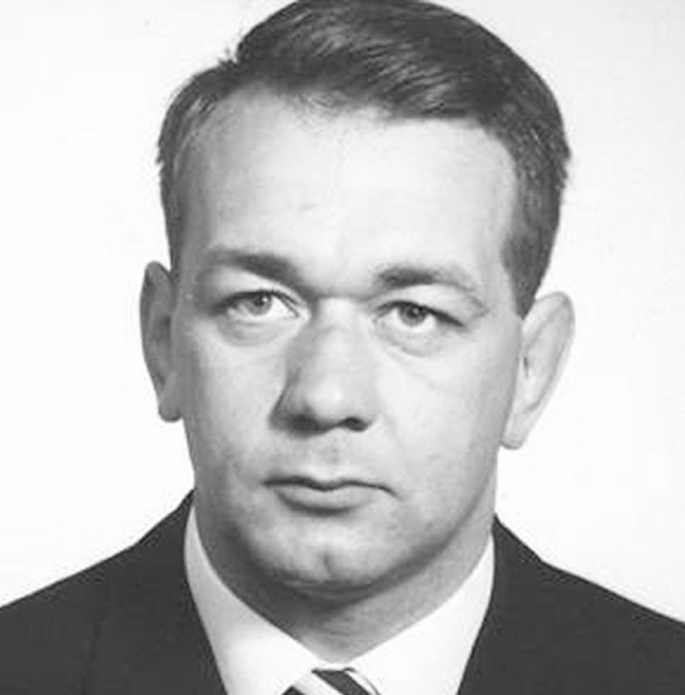
- Antonsson circa 1960

Personal information
- Born: 8 November 1934 Trollhättan, Sweden
- Died: 2 September 2021 (age 86)
- Height: 179 cm (5 ft 10 in)

Sport
- Sport: Freestyle wrestling
- Club: Uddevalla IS
Medal record
Representing Sweden
Olympic Games
Bronze medal – third place	1960 Rome	Middleweight

Hans Yngve Antonsson (8 November 1934 – 2 September 2021) was a Swedish freestyle wrestler who won a bronze medal at the 1960 Olympics. His uncle Bertil Antonsson was also an Olympic wrestler.
