= Daniel Brand =

American wrestler (1935–2015)

Personal information
- Full name: Daniel Oliver Brand
- Born: August 4, 1935 Lincoln County, Tennessee, U.S.
- Died: February 10, 2015 (aged 79) California, U.S.
- Home town: Bellevue, Nebraska, U.S.

Sport
- Country: United States
- Sport: Wrestling
- Events: Freestyle, Greco-Roman, and Folkstyle
- College team: Nebraska
- Club: Olympic Club – San Francisco
- Team: USA
Medal record
Men's freestyle wrestling
Representing the United States
Olympic Games
Bronze medal – third place	1964 Tokyo	79 kg
World Championships
Bronze medal – third place	1962 Toledo	87 kg

Daniel Oliver "Dan" Brand (August 4, 1935 – February 10, 2015) was an American wrestler. He attended the University of Nebraska–Lincoln, where he was an All-American in 1958. He was inducted into the National Wrestling Hall of Fame as a Distinguished Member in 2011.

Brand won a bronze medal in freestyle wrestling (79 kg weight class) at the 1964 Summer Olympics, which were held in Tokyo. On the way to his medal, he defeated Theuni Van Wyk of the Netherlands, Tasuo Sasaki of Japan, and Faiz Muhammad of Pakistan. He lost his final match to Hasan Güngör of Turkey, who won the silver medal.

Before the 1964 Olympics, Brand had won four straight titles in freestyle wrestling at the Amateur Athletic Union National Championships, along with three straight titles in Greco-Roman wrestling. Brand was a World bronze medalist in freestyle wrestling at the 1962 World Championships at 87 kg.

Brand also participated in the 1960 Summer Olympics at Rome, where he placed fifth. He died on February 10, 2015, at the age of 79.
