= Gang Du-man =

South Korean wrestler

Personal information
- Nationality: South Korean
- Born: 12 April 1933 (age 93)

Sport
- Sport: Wrestling

Gang Du-man (born 12 April 1933) is a South Korean wrestler. He competed in two events at the 1964 Summer Olympics.
