= Prodan Gardzhev =

Bulgarian freestyle wrestler

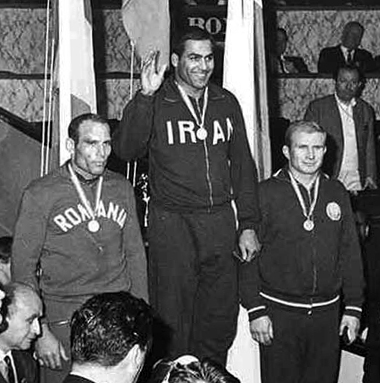
- Gardzhev (right) at the 1965 World Championships

Personal information
- Born: 8 April 1936 Rosenovo, Burgas Region, Bulgaria
- Died: 5 July 2003 (aged 67) Burgas, Bulgaria
- Height: 175 cm (5 ft 9 in)

Sport
- Sport: Freestyle wrestling
- Club: Chernomorets Burgas
Medal record
Men's freestyle wrestling
Representing Bulgaria
Olympic Games
Gold medal – first place	1964 Tokyo	87 kg
Bronze medal – third place	1968 Mexico City	87 kg
World Championships
Gold medal – first place	1963 Sofia	87 kg
Bronze medal – third place	1965 Manchester	87 kg
Gold medal – first place	1966 Toledo	87 kg
European Championships
Bronze medal – third place	1967 Istanbul	87 kg
Silver medal – second place	1968 Skopje	87 kg

Prodan Stoyanov Gardzhev (Bulgarian: Продан Стоянов Гарджев, 8 April 1936 – 5 July 2003) was a Bulgarian middleweight freestyle wrestler. He competed at the 1960, 1964 and 1968 Olympics and won a gold medal in 1964 and a bronze in 1968. Gardzhev held the world title in 1963 and 1966 and placed third in 1965.
