= Géza Hollósi =

Hungarian wrestler (1938–2002)

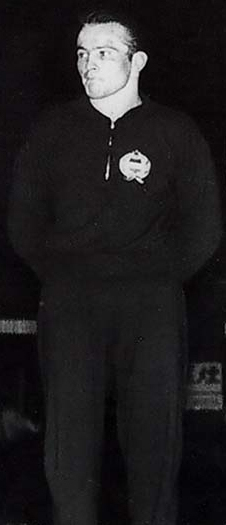
- Géza Hollósi in 1961

Personal information
- Nationality: Hungarian
- Born: 2 May 1938; Budapest, Hungary
- Died: 6 September 2002 (aged 64); Budapest, Hungary

Sport
- Sport: Wrestling

Géza Hollósi (2 May 1938 – 6 September 2002) was a Hungarian wrestler. He competed at the 1960 Summer Olympics, the 1964 Summer Olympics and the 1968 Summer Olympics.
