= Deaths in December 2020 =

The following is a list of notable deaths in December 2020.

Entries for each day are listed alphabetically by surname. A typical entry lists information in the following sequence:

- Name, age, country of citizenship at birth, subsequent country of citizenship (if applicable), reason for notability, cause of death (if known), and reference.

== December 2020 ==
=== 1 ===
- Loris Abate, 92, Italian jewellery designer.
- Norman Abramson, 88, American engineer and computer scientist, developer of ALOHAnet, skin cancer.
- Faustino Amiano, 76, Spanish Olympic coxswain (1960).
- G. Ross Anderson, 91, American jurist, judge of the U.S. District Court for South Carolina (1980–2009).
- Hasna Begum, 85, Bangladeshi philosopher and feminist, COVID-19.
- June Rose Bellamy, 88, Burmese aristocrat and socialite, first lady (1976–1977).
- Abhay Bharadwaj, 66, Indian politician, MP (since 2020), COVID-19.
- Keith Buckley, 79, English actor (Dr. Phibes Rises Again, The Eagle Has Landed, Sky Bandits).
- Russell Catley, 47, English cricketer (Suffolk), brain cancer.
- Jean Cottard, 94, French fencer and fencing master.
- Eric Engstrom, 55, American software engineer (DirectX), hepatotoxicity.
- Todd Gibson, 83, American racing driver.
- Judy Gordon, 72, Canadian politician, member of the Legislative Assembly of Alberta (1993–2004).
- Luciano Guerzoni, 82, Italian politician, deputy (1983–1992, 1994–1996).
- Juan Hormaechea, 81, Spanish politician, president of Cantabria (1987–1990, 1991–1995) and mayor of Santander (1977–1987).
- Maria Itkina, 88, Russian Olympic runner (1956, 1960, 1964).
- Nina Ivanova, 86, Russian actress (Once There Was a Girl, Spring on Zarechnaya Street, There Is Such a Lad).
- Brian Kerr, Baron Kerr of Tonaghmore, 72, British jurist, lord chief justice of Northern Ireland (2004–2009) and justice of the Supreme Court of the United Kingdom (2009–2020).
- Mana Kinjo, 24, Japanese actress (Kishiryu Sentai Ryusoulger).
- Jean-Pierre Lola Kisanga, 51, Congolese politician, COVID-19.
- Paul Kishindo, 68, Malawian sociologist.
- Evelyn Konou, 72, Marshallese politician.
- Frank Kramer, 73, Dutch footballer (FC Volendam, Telstar), television presenter and football commentator.
- Li Guanxing, 80, Chinese nuclear material engineer, member of the Chinese Academy of Engineering.
- Eduardo Lourenço, 97, Portuguese philosopher and writer.
- Mohammad Maleki, 87, Iranian academic, chancellor of the University of Tehran (1979).
- Denis Menke, 80, American baseball player (Milwaukee / Atlanta Braves, Houston Astros, Cincinnati Reds).
- Leonardo Fernandes Moreira, 46, Brazilian politician, Minas Gerais MLA (2003–2011), heart attack.
- Nomula Narsimhaiah Yadav, 64, Indian politician, Telangana MLA (since 2018), complications from COVID-19.
- Timoteo Ofrasio, 72, Filipino Jesuit priest and liturgist, COVID-19.
- Thelma Pepper, 100, Canadian artist.
- Thomas Morrow Reavley, 99, American politician and jurist, secretary of state of Texas (1955–1957) and judge of the U.S. Court of Appeals for the Fifth Circuit (since 1979).
- Arnie Robinson, 72, American athlete, Olympic champion (1976), COVID-19.
- Erlend Rian, 79, Norwegian politician, mayor of Tromsø (1980–1995).
- Tommy Sandt, 69, American baseball player (Oakland Athletics) and coach (Pittsburgh Pirates).
- Kelvin Scarborough, 56, American basketball player (New Mexico Lobos).
- Joseph Sledge, 76, American wrongly imprisoned prisoner.
- Hanna Stadnik, 91, Polish World War II combatant (Warsaw Uprising), acting president of World Association of Home Army Soldiers (since 2020).
- Henri Teissier, 91, French-Algerian Roman Catholic prelate, archbishop of Algiers (1988–2008), stroke.
- Sol Tolchinsky, 91, Canadian Olympic basketball player (1948), complications of COVID-19.
- Raymond Wolters, 82, American historian.

=== 2 ===
- Mohamed Abarhoun, 31, Moroccan footballer (Moghreb Tétouan, Moreirense, national team), stomach cancer.
- Jean René Allard, 90, Canadian politician, member of the Manitoba Legislature (1969–1973).
- Warren Berlinger, 83, American actor (The Joey Bishop Show, The Cannonball Run, The World According to Garp), cancer.
- Frank Carney, 82, American entrepreneur, co-founder of Pizza Hut, pneumonia.
- Richard Corben, 80, American illustrator and comic book artist, complications from heart surgery.
- Bronisław Dankowski, 76, Polish politician and trade union activist, member of the Sejm (1997–2005).
- Koba Davitashvili, 49, Georgian politician, MP (1999-2006, 2008, 2012–2016), ankylosing spondylitis.
- Franco Giraldi, 89, Italian film director (Seven Guns for the MacGregors, Sugar Colt, Up the MacGregors!) and screenwriter, COVID-19.
- Valéry Giscard d'Estaing, 94, French politician, president of France and co-prince of Andorra (1974–1981), minister of the economy and finance (1962–1966, 1969–1974), complications from COVID-19.
- Satpal Gosain, 85, Indian politician, Punjab MLA (1997–2012).
- Kazuo Hiramatsu, 73, Japanese accountant, president of the Kwansei Gakuin University (2002–2008).
- Zafarullah Khan Jamali, 76, Pakistani politician, prime minister (2002–2004) and chief minister of Balochistan (1988, 1996–1997), heart attack.
- Rafer Johnson, 86, American athlete and actor (The Sins of Rachel Cade, None but the Brave, Licence to Kill), Olympic champion (1960), complications from a stroke.
- Kenneth V. Jones, 96, British composer, conductor and music teacher.
- Hugh Keays-Byrne, 73, English-Australian actor (Mad Max: Fury Road, Stone, Farscape).
- Sergey Kiselnikov, 62, Russian footballer (Dynamo Vologda, Amur Blagoveshchensk).
- Alanna Knight, 97, British writer.
- Alfred Kucharczyk, 83, Polish Olympic gymnast (1960, 1964), COVID-19.
- David C. Lewis, 85, American medical researcher.
- Karin Lindberg, 91, Swedish gymnast, Olympic champion (1952).
- Enrique Lingenfelder, 92, Argentine Olympic rower (1948).
- Geoffrey Massey, 96, Canadian architect, pneumonia.
- Aldo Moser, 86, Italian racing cyclist, COVID-19.
- Pat Patterson, 79, Canadian-American Hall of Fame professional wrestler (BTW, AWA) and producer (WWF), liver failure.
- Boris Plotnikov, 71, Russian actor (The Ascent, The Cold Summer of 1953, Heart of a Dog), COVID-19.
- Fred Rosen, 67, American columnist and author.
- Karim Salman, 55, Iraqi Olympic footballer (1988), COVID-19.
- David Sheehan, 82, American reporter, prostate cancer.
- Bill Spanswick, 82, American baseball player (Boston Red Sox).
- Lalit Surjan, 74, Indian journalist and editor (Deshbandhu), stroke.
- Pamela Tiffin, 78, American actress (One, Two, Three, Harper, Summer and Smoke) and model.
- Bernard Vogler, 85, French historian and academic.
- Walter E. Williams, 84, American economist and academic.

=== 3 ===
- Noah Creshevsky, 75, American composer, cancer.
- Fred DeBernardi, 71, American football player (Kansas City Chiefs) and discus thrower, cancer.
- Bill Fitsell, 97, Canadian sports journalist and historian.
- Paudie Fitzgerald, 87, Irish racing cyclist.
- Maria Fyfe, 82, Scottish politician, MP (1987–2001).
- André Gagnon, 84, Canadian pianist, composer and conductor, Lewy body dementia.
- Dharampal Gulati, 97, Indian spice executive, CEO of MDH (since 1959), cardiac arrest.
- Dadang Hawari, 80, Indonesian psychiatrist, COVID-19.
- Mian Muhammad Afzal Hayat, Pakistani politician, chief minister of Punjab (1996–1997).
- Steve Heimkreiter, 63, American football player (Baltimore Colts), cancer.
- Bill Holmes, 94, English footballer (Blackburn Rovers, Bradford City).
- Volodymyr Huba, 81, Ukrainian composer and poet.
- Kaj Ikast, 84, Danish politician, MF (1993–2005), minister of transport (1990–1993).
- Vicente Iborra, 88, Spanish football player (Valencia, Elche) and manager, dementia.
- Adil Ismayilov, 63, Azerbaijani lawyer, jurist, and investigator, COVID-19.
- William King, 90, Canadian politician, member of the Legislative Assembly of British Columbia (1972–1983).
- Kiptarus Arap Kirior, Kenyan politician, MP (1983–1988, 1992–1997).
- Lester B. Korn, 84, American businessman and diplomat.
- Jutta Lampe, 82, German actress (Schaubühne, Marianne and Juliane, The Distant Land).
- Alison Lurie, 94, American novelist (Foreign Affairs, The War Between the Tates), Pulitzer Prize winner (1984).
- Mario Maraschi, 81, Italian football player (Lazio, Lanerossi Vicenza, Fiorentina) and manager.
- Marv Marinovich, 81, American football player (Oakland Raiders).
- Patricia Marmont, 99, American-born British actress (Helen of Troy).
- Ron Mathewson, 76, Scottish jazz double bassist and bass guitarist, COVID-19.
- Dronamraju Krishna Rao, 83, Indian geneticist.
- Albert Salvadó, 69, Andorran writer and industrial engineer.
- Scott Marshall Smith, 62, American screenwriter (Men of Honor, The Score, When the Game Stands Tall).
- Bill Spencer, 84, American Olympic biathlon skier (1964, 1968).
- Betsy Wade, 91, American journalist, colon cancer.
- Bobby Wishart, 87, Scottish footballer (Aberdeen, Dundee, Raith Rovers).
- Ian Yule, 87, British-born South African actor (Zulu Dawn, The Wild Geese, Shamwari).

=== 4 ===
- Josette Banzet, 73, French-American actress (Rich Man, Poor Man, The Other Side of Midnight).
- Franco Bolignari, 91, Italian singer.
- Peter DiFronzo, 87, American mobster, complications from COVID-19.
- Larry Dixon, 78, American politician, member of the Alabama Senate (1983–2011) and House of Representatives (1978–1982), COVID-19.
- Ole Espersen, 85, Danish politician, minister of justice (1981–1982).
- Gérard Gourgue, 95, Haitian politician, member of the National Council of Government (1986).
- Cliff Green, 85, Australian screenwriter (Picnic at Hanging Rock, Break of Day, Summerfield).
- Goldie Hershon, 79, Canadian civil rights activist, president of the Canadian Jewish Congress (1995–1998).
- Narinder Singh Kapany, 94, Indian-American physicist.
- William Kittredge, 88, American writer.
- Grace Knowlton, 88, American sculptor, complications from dementia.
- David Lander, 73, American actor (Laverne & Shirley, Who Framed Roger Rabbit, Will the Real Jerry Lewis Please Sit Down), complications from multiple sclerosis.
- François Leterrier, 91, French film director (A King Without Distraction, Slices of Life) and actor (A Man Escaped).
- Antonín J. Liehm, 96, Czech writer, publisher and translator, founder of Lettre International.
- Madeleine Mathiot, 93, American linguist.
- Larry Mavety, 78, Canadian ice hockey player (Los Angeles Sharks, Philadelphia Blazers) and coach (Belleville Bulls).
- Jayant Meghani, 82, Indian book editor and translator.
- Alexander Nikolayevich Mikhailov, 69, Russian politician, deputy (1993–2000) and governor of Kursk Oblast (2000–2018).
- James Odongo, 89, Ugandan Roman Catholic prelate, archbishop of Tororo (1999–2007).
- Huba Rozsnyai, 77, Hungarian Olympic sprinter (1964), COVID-19.
- Bassam Saba, 61, Lebanese musician, complications from COVID-19.
- Jackie Saccoccio, 56, American abstract painter, cancer.
- Anatoly Samoilenko, 82, Ukrainian mathematician, director of the NASU Institute of Mathematics (since 1988).
- Victor Scantlebury, 75, Ecuadorian bishop.
- John Sherwood, 87, English physical chemist.
- Suhaila Siddiq, 71, Afghan politician, minister of public health (2001–2004), complications from COVID-19.
- Dineshwar Sharma, 66, Indian police officer, director of the Intelligence Bureau (2015–2017) and administrator of Lakshadweep (since 2019), lung disease.
- Anand Singh, 72, Fijian politician, MP (1999–2006) and attorney general (1999–2000).
- Wayne Stewart, 73, Canadian-born American football player (New York Jets, San Diego Chargers).
- Kinuko Tanida, 81, Japanese volleyball player, Olympic champion (1964), brain hemorrhage.
- Ferenc Tóth, 69, Hungarian politician, MP (1998–2014), COVID-19.
- Weston E. Vivian, 96, American politician, member of the U.S. House of Representatives (1965–1967).
- Neville Wanless, 89, English broadcaster (ITV Tyne Tees).
- Ed Xiques, 81, American jazz saxophonist.

=== 5 ===
- Peter Abbs, 78, English poet and academic.
- Peter Alliss, 89, English Hall of Fame golfer and commentator, British PGA champion (1957, 1962, 1965).
- Pierre Bernard, 86, French politician, deputy (1980–1993).
- Mickaël Bethe-Selassié, 69, Ethiopian-born French sculptor.
- Belinda Bozzoli, South African politician, MP (since 2014), cancer.
- Ronald Cassidy, 81, Trinidadian Olympic cyclist.
- Robert Castel, 87, French actor (The Tall Blond Man with One Black Shoe, Two Men in Town, Je suis timide mais je me soigne).
- Dolf de Vries, 83, Dutch actor (Turkish Delight, Soldier of Orange, Black Book).
- Des Ferrow, 87, New Zealand cricketer.
- John Harvey, 82, Australian racing driver, Bathurst 1000 winner (1983), lung cancer.
- Paul Howard, 70, American football player (Denver Broncos).
- Louis Iribarne, 80, American-born Canadian translator.
- Ron Irwin, 84, Canadian politician and diplomat, minister of Indian and Northern Affairs (1993–1997), ambassador to Ireland (1998–2001), MP (1980–1984, 1993–1997).
- Henryk Kukier, 90, Polish Olympic boxer (1952, 1956, 1960), COVID-19.
- Anusuya Prasad Maikhuri, 59, Indian politician, Uttarakhand MLA (2002–2007, 2012–2017), complications from COVID-19.
- Sherbaz Khan Mazari, 90, Pakistani politician, leader of the opposition (1975–1977).
- Sakae Menda, 95, Japanese exonerated prisoner and anti-death penalty activist.
- Ildikó Pécsi, 80, Hungarian actress (Tales of a Long Journey, A Strange Role, Just like Home) and politician, MP (1994–1998).
- Viktor Ponedelnik, 83, Russian football player (Rostov, SKA Rostov-on-Don, Soviet Union national team) and manager.
- Geoff Pryce, 59, English rugby league player (York Wasps), COVID-19.
- Martin Sandoval, 56, American politician, member of the Illinois Senate (2003–2020), COVID-19.
- Erode Soundar, 63, Indian film writer and director, kidney-related illness.
- Walter Steiner, 74, Swiss Olympic rower.
- Xu Shousheng, 67, Chinese politician, governor of Gansu (2007–2010), governor (2010–2013) and Communist Party secretary (2013–2016) of Hunan.
- Mincho Yovchev, 78, Bulgarian politician, deputy prime minister (1989–1990).
- Wojciech Zabłocki, 89, Polish architect and fencer, Olympic silver (1956, 1960) and bronze (1964) medalist.
- Theodore Ziolkowski, 88, American scholar.

=== 6 ===
- Neil Armstrong, 87, Canadian Hall of Fame ice hockey linesman.
- Ray Baird, 90, Canadian politician.
- Kent R. Brown, 79, American playwright.
- Jairo Castillo, 31, Dominican baseball player and scout, COVID-19.
- Brian Cresswell, 86, Welsh rugby union player.
- Dejan Dabović, 76, Montenegrin water polo player, Olympic champion (1968), COVID-19.
- Muslihan DS, 74, Indonesian army officer and politician, regent of North Bengkulu (2001–2006) and Rejang Lebong (1994–1999), COVID-19.
- T. B. Ekanayake, 66, Sri Lankan politician, MP (since 1994).
- Jaromír Kohlíček, 67, Czech politician, MP (1998–2004), MEP (2004–2014, 2016–2019).
- László Kuncz, 63, Hungarian water polo player, Olympic bronze medallist (1980).
- Li Ligong, 95, Chinese politician, member of the Central Committee (1982–1992), delegate to the National People's Congress (1988-1998) and CCP Party Chief of Shanxi (1983–1991).
- Monu Mukherjee, 90, Indian actor (Neel Akasher Neechey, Ganadevata, Ganashatru).
- Soedardjat Nataatmadja, 82, Indonesian politician, MP (1997–1999), vice governor of Irian Jaya (1989–1993) and regent of Bogor (1983–1988).
- Klaus Ofczarek, 81, Austrian actor (Klimt, North Face) and opera singer.
- Ravi Patwardhan, 84, Indian actor (Yeshwant, Thakshak, Grahan).
- Jacques Puisais, 93, French oenologist, COVID-19.
- Dennis Ralston, 78, American Hall of Fame tennis player, Davis Cup winner (1963, 1972), cancer.
- Džej Ramadanovski, 56, Serbian singer, heart attack.
- Neil Robbins, 91, Australian Olympic steeplechase runner (1956).
- Paul Sarbanes, 87, American politician, member of the U.S. House of Representatives (1971–1977) and Senate (1977–2007), Chair of the Senate Banking Committee (2001–2003).
- Jack Scarbath, 90, American Hall of Fame football player (Washington Redskins, Pittsburgh Steelers, Maryland Terrapins).
- Paul W. Schroeder, 93, American historian.
- Eugenia Tsoumani-Spentza, Greek lawyer and politician, MP (2009–2012).
- Tabaré Vázquez, 80, Uruguayan politician, president (2005–2010, 2015–2020), president pro tempore of UNASUR (2015–2016) and Intendant of Montevideo (1990–1994), lung cancer.
- Senta Wengraf, 96, Austrian actress (Two Times Lotte, Voices of Spring, Sissi – The Young Empress).
- Ali-Asghar Zarei, 64, Iranian military officer and politician, MP (2008–2016).

=== 7 ===
- Udyavara Madhava Acharya, 79, Indian writer and poet.
- Fred Akers, 82, American football coach (Texas Longhorns, Wyoming Cowboys, Purdue Boilermakers).
- Dick Allen, 78, American baseball player (Philadelphia Phillies, Los Angeles Dodgers, Chicago White Sox).
- Akito Arima, 90, Japanese nuclear physicist (Interacting boson model) and politician, MP (1998–2004).
- Tihomir Arsić, 63, Serbian actor (The Promising Boy, Great Transport, Battle of Kosovo).
- Joseph Arvay, 71, Canadian lawyer, heart attack.
- LD Beghtol, 55, American musician (Flare Acoustic Arts League, LD & the New Criticism, Moth Wranglers) and writer.
- Divya Bhatnagar, 34, Indian actress (99), COVID-19.
- Joselyn Cano, 30, American model, complications from cosmetic surgery.
- Jean-François Charbonnier, 61, French footballer and manager (Paris Saint-Germain F.C., Paris FC).
- Natalie Desselle-Reid, 53, American actress (B.A.P.S., Eve, Rodgers and Hammerstein's Cinderella), colon cancer.
- Pumza Dyantyi, 72, South African politician and anti-apartheid activist, MP (since 2019) and Eastern Cape MPL (2014–2019).
- Clem Eischen, 93, American Olympic middle-distance runner (1948).
- Phyllis Eisenstein, 74, American science fiction author, stroke complications and COVID-19.
- Dimitar Galinchev, 82, Bulgarian Olympic wrestler.
- Eduardo Galvão, 58, Brazilian actor (Porto dos Milagres, O Beijo do Vampiro, Bom Sucesso), COVID-19.
- Aleksandr Gordon, 88, Russian film director and actor (The Killers, There Will Be No Leave Today).
- İrfan Gürpınar, 77, Turkish politician, minister of tourism (1995, 1995–1996), COVID-19.
- Sheila A. Hellstrom, 85, Canadian military officer.
- Walter Hooper, 89, American literary editor, complications from COVID-19.
- Ken Huxhold, 91, American football player (Philadelphia Eagles).
- Zar Wali Khan, 67, Pakistani Islamic scholar.
- Masao Komatsu, 78, Japanese actor (Kaiju funsen–Daigoro tai Goriasu, Pink Lady no Katsudō Daishashin, Izakaya Chōji) and comedian, liver cancer.
- Katarzyna Łaniewska, 87, Polish actress (Nikodem Dyzma, Klan) and political activist.
- Marilyn Lewis, 89, American politician, member of the Pennsylvania House of Representatives (1979–1982).
- Dawn Lindberg, 75, South African folk singer, actress and theatre producer, COVID-19.
- Mrigendra Nath Maiti, 77, Indian politician, West Bengal MLA (since 2011).
- Sean Malone, 50, American progressive metal bassist (Cynic, Gordian Knot, Aghora), suicide.
- Lidia Menapace, 96, Italian partisan and politician, senator (2006–2008), COVID-19.
- Roger Moret, 71, Puerto Rican baseball player (Boston Red Sox, Atlanta Braves, Texas Rangers), cancer.
- Vadim Petrov, 88, Czech composer and pianist.
- Joseph Sanda, 35, Cameroonian racing cyclist.
- Janusz Sanocki, 66, Polish politician and journalist, mayor of Nysa (1998–2001), deputy (2015–2019), COVID-19.
- Doug Scott, 79, English mountaineer and philanthropist, cerebral lymphoma.
- Malcolm Simpson, 87, New Zealand Olympic cyclist (1952).
- Ildegarda Taffra, 86, Italian Olympic cross-country skier (1952, 1956), COVID-19.
- Tasiman, Indonesian politician, regent of Pati (2001–2011), COVID-19.
- Howard Wales, 77, American keyboardist ("Truckin'"), cerebral hemorrhage.
- Gary Wisener, 82, American football player (Dallas Cowboys, Houston Oilers).
- Chuck Yeager, 97, American Hall of Fame pilot, first person to exceed the speed of sound.

=== 8 ===
- Phil Albert, 76, American football coach (Towson Tigers), cancer.
- Arthur, Ecuadorian stray dog.
- Gladys Beckwith, 91, American academic and women's rights activist, COVID-19.
- Harold Budd, 84, American avant-garde composer and poet, complications from COVID-19.
- John Cash, 84, Scottish physician, president of the Royal College of Physicians of Edinburgh (1994–1997).
- Lay Nam Chang, 77, American theoretical physicist, COVID-19.
- Tony Curcillo, 89, American football player (Ohio State Buckeyes, Chicago Cardinals, Hamilton Tiger Cats), complications from COVID-19.
- Aslanbek Fidarov, 47, Ukrainian Olympic wrestler (1996), COVID-19.
- Johnny Jacobsen, 65, Danish footballer (Fremad Amager, Feyenoord, national team).
- Goo Kennedy, 71, American basketball player (San Antonio Spurs, Spirits of St. Louis, Houston Rockets).
- Sidney Knott, 87, South African cricketer (Border).
- Walter Lechner, 71, Austrian racing driver.
- Tom Louderback, 87, American football player (Philadelphia Eagles, Oakland Raiders, Buffalo Bills).
- Jordi Nadal, 91, Spanish historian and economist.
- Klaus Pagh, 85, Danish actor (Soldaterkammerater rykker ud, Sunstroke at the Beach Resort, Me and the Mafia).
- Shankar Painter, 74, Indian poet.
- Raffaele Pinto, 75, Italian rally driver, European Rally champion (1972).
- Homan Potterton, 74, Irish art historian and writer, cancer.
- Elmira Ramazanova, 86, Azerbaijani geologist, member of the Azerbaijan National Academy of Sciences.
- Roy Ridge, 86, English footballer (Rochdale, Sheffield United).
- Alejandro Sabella, 66, Argentine football player (River Plate, Estudiantes) and manager (national team), heart failure.
- Yevgeny Shaposhnikov, 78, Russian military officer, minister of defence (1991–1992), commander-in-chief of the Air Force (1990–1991) and secretary of the SCRF (1993), COVID-19.
- Anthony Veasna So, 28, Cambodian-American writer, accidental drug overdose.
- Kurt Stettler, 88, Swiss footballer (FC Basel, Young Fellows Zürich, national team), COVID-19.
- Gerard Stokes, 65, New Zealand rugby league player (Workington Town, national team) and coach (Canterbury Bulls), brain cancer.
- Sudjati, 66, Indonesian politician, regent of Bulungan (since 2016), COVID-19.
- Graeme Tarr, 84, New Zealand cricketer.
- Siraj Kassam Teli, 67, Pakistani industrialist, pneumonia.
- Allen Trovillion, 94, American politician.
- Michael Turner, 72, English Olympic swimmer.
- Roberto Ulloa, 96, Argentine politician and naval officer, governor of Salta Province (1977–1983, 1991–1995).
- Ralph K. Winter Jr., 85, American jurist, judge (since 1981) and chief judge (1997–2000) of the U.S. Court of Appeals for the Second Circuit.
- Wang Yupu, 64, Chinese oil executive and politician, minister of emergency management (since 2018), chairman of Sinopec (2015–2017) and member of the CAE, cancer.

=== 9 ===
- Norman Bodek, 88, American management consultant and author.
- Christopher Campling, 95, British Anglican priest, dean of Ripon (1984–1995).
- V. J. Chitra, 28, Indian actress (Mannan Magal, Chinna Papa Periya Papa, Darling Darling), suicide by hanging.
- Osvaldo Cochrane Filho, 87, Brazilian Olympic water polo player (1964), COVID-19.
- Manglesh Dabral, 72, Indian poet, complications from COVID-19.
- Nabil Farouk, 64, Egyptian novelist (Ragol Al Mostaheel, Malaf Al Mostakbal, Cocktail 2000), heart attack.
- Gordon Forbes, 86, South African tennis player, COVID-19.
- Dick Hinch, 71, American politician, member (since 2008) and speaker (since 2020) of the New Hampshire House of Representatives, COVID-19.
- Raymond Hunter, 86, Northern Irish cricketer (all-Ireland national team) and rugby union player (all-Ireland national team).
- Alan Igbon, 68, British actor (Boys from the Blackstuff, The Professionals, Coronation Street).
- Vyacheslav Kebich, 84, Belarusian politician, prime minister (1991–1994), COVID-19.
- Phil Linz, 81, American baseball player (New York Yankees, Philadelphia Phillies, New York Mets).
- Mungo Wentworth MacCallum, 78, Australian political journalist and commentator.
- John J. McNichols, 93, American politician.
- Marc Meneau, 77, French chef.
- Brian H. Murdoch, 90, English-born Irish mathematician.
- Alex Olmedo, 84, Peruvian-American Hall of Fame tennis player.
- Ray Perkins, 79, American football player (Baltimore Colts) and coach (New York Giants, Tampa Bay Buccaneers), heart disease.
- Paolo Rossi, 64, Italian footballer (Lanerossi Vicenza, Juventus, national team), world champion (1982), lung cancer.
- Vishnu Savara, 70, Indian politician, Maharashtra MLA (2014–2019), cirrhosis.
- Jason Slater, 49, American rock bassist (Third Eye Blind, Snake River Conspiracy, Brougham), liver failure.
- Stanley Smith, 71, American racing driver, interstitial pneumonia.
- Mohammad Yazdi, 89, Iranian Islamic cleric, chairman of the Assembly of Experts (2015–2016), chief justice (1989–1999) and MP (1980–1988), digestive disease.
- Chowdhury Kamal Ibne Yusuf, 80, Bangladeshi politician, MP (1991–2006), minister of disaster management (2001–2006) and food (2004–2006), COVID-19.

=== 10 ===
- Maroof Afzal, Pakistani civil servant, cabinet secretary (2019–2020), COVID-19.
- Kenneth Alwyn, 95, English conductor (BBC Radio 2, London Symphony Orchestra).
- Brandon Bernard, 40, American convicted murderer, execution by lethal injection.
- Wallace Barnes, 94, American politician, member of the Connecticut Senate (1959–1971).
- Rafael Ramón Conde Alfonzo, 77, Venezuelan Roman Catholic prelate, bishop of Maracay (2008–2009) and Margarita (1999–2008), pancreatic cancer.
- Don Marion Davis, 103, American child actor (The Star Boarder, Down on the Farm, Percy).
- Astad Deboo, 73, Indian dancer and choreographer, subdural haematoma.
- Billy DeMars, 95, American baseball player (St. Louis Browns) and coach (Philadelphia Phillies, Cincinnati Reds).
- Dudu Duswara, 69, Indonesian jurist, justice of Supreme Court (since 2011), COVID-19.
- Jim Fleming, 78, Scottish footballer (Partick Thistle, Luton Town, Wigan Athletic).
- Cal Hockley, 85, Canadian ice hockey player (Trail Smoke Eaters).
- João Jens, 76, Brazilian Olympic volleyball player (1968, 1972).
- Tommy Lister Jr., 62, American actor (Friday, The Fifth Element, No Holds Barred) and professional wrestler, cardiovascular disease.
- Rita Martinez, 65, Chicana activist, COVID-19.
- Nemanja Miljković, 30, Serbian basketball player (Zemun Lasta, BC Vienna, Pärnu).
- Victor Newman, Ghanaian politician.
- Juan Pérez-Giménez, 79, American jurist, judge (since 1979) and chief judge (1984–1991) of the U.S. District Court for Puerto Rico.
- Ram Lal Rahi, 86, Indian politician, MP (1977–1984, 1989–1996) and minister of state for home affairs (1991–1996), complications from COVID-19.
- Odette Richard, 32, South African Olympic rhythmic gymnast (2008).
- Garry Runciman, 3rd Viscount Runciman of Doxford, 86, British historical sociologist.
- José Mario Ruiz Navas, 90, Ecuadorian Roman Catholic prelate, bishop of Latacunga (1968–1989) and archbishop of Portoviejo (1989–2007).
- Joseph Safra, 82, Lebanese-Brazilian banker and venture capitalist, founder of Banco Safra.
- Iman Budhi Santosa, 72, Indonesian author, heart attack.
- Myriam Sienra, 81, Paraguayan actress (7 Boxes) and journalist.
- Andrzej Skowroński, 67, Polish Olympic rower (1980).
- Carol Sutton, 76, American actress (Steel Magnolias, Ray, Monster's Ball), complications from COVID-19.
- Bryan Sykes, 73, British geneticist.
- Dame Barbara Windsor, 83, English actress (EastEnders, Carry On, Chitty Chitty Bang Bang), complications from Alzheimer's disease.
- Barry Wynks, 68, New Zealand lawn bowler.
- Rahnaward Zaryab, 76, Afghan novelist, journalist, and literary critic, COVID-19.

=== 11 ===
- Alfred Bourgeois, 56, American convicted murderer, execution by lethal injection.
- Jim Burns, 75, American basketball player (Chicago Bulls, Dallas Chaparrals) and Illinois inspector general.
- Per Carlsen, 72, Danish diplomat, ambassador to Lithuania (1997–2001), Russia and Belarus (2005–2010) and Latvia (2010–2015). (death announced on this date)
- Artyom Chernov, 38, Russian ice hockey player (HC Vityaz, Metallurg Novokuznetsk), heart attack.
- Beryl Cunningham, 74, Jamaican actress and model.
- Farid Abraão David, 76, Brazilian politician, mayor of Nilópolis (2001–2009, 2017–2020), COVID-19.
- Roy Douglas, 95, British academic and political activist.
- D. Ethiraj, 86, Indian footballer (Mysore, national team).
- Gotthilf Fischer, 92, German choral conductor (Fischer-Chöre).
- James Flynn, 86, American-born New Zealand intelligence researcher.
- Đurđa Ivezić, 84, Croatian actress (H-8, Back of the Medal, The Magician's Hat), COVID-19.
- Carol R. Johnson, 91, American landscape architect.
- Ian Johnston, 91, Canadian Olympic field hockey player.
- Boniface Kabaka, Kenyan politician, senator (since 2017), stroke.
- Kim Ki-duk, 59, South Korean film director (The Isle, Spring, Summer, Fall, Winter... and Spring, 3-Iron), complications from COVID-19.
- Alva Hugh Maddox, 90, American jurist, justice of the Supreme Court of Alabama (1969–2001).
- Malik, 72, Belgian comic book artist (Cupidon).
- Sam Nda-Isaiah, 58, Nigerian political columnist, entrepreneur and journalist, founder of Leadership.
- Joseph Nyagah, 72, Kenyan politician, COVID-19.
- Assad Rizk, 89, Lebanese physician and politician.
- Sven Sachsalber, 33, Italian artist.
- Lev Shcheglov, 74, Russian sexologist and psychotherapist, COVID-19.
- Charlotte Tillar Schexnayder, 96, American politician, member of the Arkansas House of Representatives (1985–1999).
- Jimmy Snyder, 86, American country singer.
- Mongkol Na Songkhla, 79, Thai politician, minister of public health (2006–2008), cancer.
- Andrzej Tomaszewicz, 77, Polish historian and politician, Solidarity activist, senator (1989–1991).
- Richard Tötterman, 94, Finnish diplomat.
- Leslie Ungerleider, 74, American experimental psychologist and neuroscientist.
- Irena Veisaitė, 92, Lithuanian theatre scholar and human rights activist, COVID-19.

=== 12 ===
- James Atwell, 74, British Anglican priest, dean of St Edmundsbury (2000–2006) and Winchester (2006–2016).
- Bird Averitt, 68, American basketball player (San Antonio Spurs, Kentucky Colonels, Buffalo Braves), ABA champion (1975).
- Ronald James Baker, 96, Canadian academic administrator, president of the University of Prince Edward Island (1969–1978).
- Claude Castonguay, 91, Canadian politician, educator and businessman, senator (1990–1992) and Quebec MNA (1970–1973).
- Nicolas Chumachenco, 76, Polish violinist.
- Escurinho, 90, Brazilian footballer (Villa Nova, Fluminense, national team).
- Valentin Gaft, 85, Russian actor (Hello, I'm Your Aunt!, Say a Word for the Poor Hussar, Forgotten Melody for a Flute), People's Artist of the RSFSR (1984).
- Alfonso Gagliano, 78, Canadian politician, MP (1984–2002), minister of labour (1996–1997) and public works and government services (1997–2002).
- Victor Gnanapragasam, 80, Sri Lankan Roman Catholic prelate, vicar apostolic of Quetta (since 2001), heart attack.
- Anneli Haaranen, 86, Finnish Olympic swimmer (1952).
- Bob Kaliban, 87, American actor (Princess Gwenevere and the Jewel Riders, It Runs in the Family , Schoolhouse Rock!).
- Terry Kay, 82, American author (To Dance with the White Dog), liver cancer.
- U. A. Khader, 85, Indian author, lung cancer.
- Damir Kukuruzović, 45, Croatian jazz guitarist, COVID-19.
- John le Carré, 89, British-Irish author (Tinker Tailor Soldier Spy, The Night Manager, The Little Drummer Girl), pneumonia.
- Motjeka Madisha, 25, South African footballer (Highlands Park, Mamelodi Sundowns, national team), traffic collision.
- John McSeveney, 89, Scottish football player (Newport County, Hull City) and manager (Barnsley).
- Janos Mohoss, 84, Swiss Olympic fencer (1972), COVID-19.
- Dick Murphy, 89, American baseball player (Cincinnati Redlegs).
- Dennis Parmenter, 69, American politician.
- Ferruccio Pisoni, 84, Italian politician, deputy (1968–1983).
- Jerzy Mikułowski Pomorski, 83, Polish sociologist, rector of the Kraków University of Economics (1990–1996).
- Charley Pride, 86, American Hall of Fame singer ("Kiss an Angel Good Mornin'", "Is Anybody Goin' to San Antone") and baseball player (Memphis Red Sox), complications from COVID-19.
- Ann Reinking, 71, American choreographer and actress (Chicago, Fosse, Annie), Tony winner (1997).
- Jack Steinberger, 99, German-born American physicist, Nobel Prize laureate (1988).
- Alex Treves, 91, Italian-born American Olympic fencer.
- Gene Tyranny, 75, American avant-garde composer and pianist, diabetes.
- Gloria Vaughn, 84, American politician, member of the New Mexico House of Representatives (1995–2010).
- John Ffowcs Williams, 85, British engineer.
- Fikre Selassie Wogderess, 75, Ethiopian politician, prime minister (1987–1989), complications from diabetes.
- Ruhollah Zam, 42, Iranian political activist and journalist, execution by hanging.

=== 13 ===
- Joseph Bachelder III, 88, American lawyer.
- Amedeo Baldizzone, 60, Italian football player (Atalanta, Cagliari, Piacenza) and coach.
- Frank Baumann, 87, American baseball player (Boston Red Sox, Chicago White Sox, Chicago Cubs).
- Laszlo Berkowits, 92, Hungarian-born American Reform rabbi and Holocaust survivor.
- Otto Barić, 87, Croatian football player (Lokomotiva Zagreb) and manager (Rapid Wien, national team), COVID-19.
- Robert Bloxom, 83, American politician, Virginia Secretary of Agriculture and Forestry (2005–2010) and member of the House of Delegates (1978–2004).
- Dirk Bolt, 90, Dutch architect and urban planner.
- Jorge Bruni, 79, Uruguayan politician and lawyer, minister of the interior (2009–2010).
- Greg Burdine, 61, American politician, member of the Alabama House of Representatives (2010–2014).
- Carlos Eduardo Cadoca, 80, Brazilian lawyer and politician, member of the Chamber of Deputies (1999–2019), COVID-19.
- Al Cohen, 94, American magician.
- Jimmy Collins, 74, American basketball player (Chicago Bulls) and coach (UIC Flames), complications from heart surgery.
- Ambrose Mandvulo Dlamini, 52, Swazi politician, prime minister (since 2018), COVID-19.
- John H. Elliott, 85, American biblical scholar.
- Bannanje Govindacharya, 84, Indian literary scholar.
- R. Heli, 86, Indian agriculturalist and journalist, heart attack.
- Noer Muhammad Iskandar, 65, Indonesian Islamic cleric.
- Nur Hossain Kasemi, 75, Bangladeshi Islamic scholar, co-chair of Al-Haiatul Ulya (since 2020), secretary general of Jamiat Ulema (since 2015) and Hefazat (since 2020), respiratory failure.
- Yevgeny Khoroshevtsev, 76, Russian announcer and actor, complications from COVID-19.
- P. Krishnamoorthy, 77, Indian art director (Swathi Thirunal, Oru Vadakkan Veeragatha, Vanna Vanna Pookkal) and costume designer.
- Pierre Lacroix, 72, Canadian ice hockey executive, president of the Quebec Nordiques and Colorado Avalanche (1994–2006), COVID-19.
- Catie Lazarus, 44, American comedian, writer, and podcaster (Employee of the Month), breast cancer.
- Shahid Mahmood, 81, Pakistani cricketer (Karachi Whites, national team).
- Minoru Makihara, 90, English-born Japanese business executive (Mitsubishi Corporation), heart failure.
- Philip Martin, 82, English television writer (Gangsters, Doctor Who, Z Cars).
- Jimmy McLane, 90, American swimmer, Olympic champion (1948, 1952).
- Helena de Menezes, 93, Brazilian Olympic sprinter.
- Jaroslav Mostecký, 57, Czech science fiction writer, COVID-19.
- Leith Mullings, 75, Jamaican-born American anthropologist, president of the American Anthropological Association (2011–2013), cancer.
- William Imon Norwood, 79, American pediatric cardiac surgeon and physician.
- Rose Ochi, 81, Japanese-American attorney and civil rights activist, complications from COVID-19.
- Rose Pere, 83, New Zealand educationalist and conservationist.
- Radhika Ranjan Pramanik, 87, Indian politician, MP (1989–2004).
- Sal Rocca, 74, Italian-born American politician, member of the Michigan House of Representatives (1975–1980, 1983–1994, 2001–2004), COVID-19.
- Barry Sonshine, 72, Canadian Olympic equestrian (1968).
- Pauline Anna Strom, 74, American electronic music producer.
- Paul Wass, 95, American politician, member of the Pennsylvania House of Representatives (1977–1990).
- Reginald Wilson, 93, American psychologist.

=== 14 ===
- Elbrus Abbasov, 69–70, Azerbaijani footballer (SKA Rostov-on-Don, Neftchi Baku PFC) and manager (Qarabağ), COVID-19.
- Benjamin Abeles, 95, Austrian physicist.
- Herman Asaribab, 56, Indonesian army officer, deputy chief of staff (since 2020), commander of Cendrawasih (2019–2020) and Tanjungpura (2019).
- Mamye BaCote, 81, American politician, member of the Virginia House of Delegates (2004–2016).
- Claudio Baiocchi, 80, Italian mathematician.
- Marvin Bell, 83, American professor and poet, poet laureate of Iowa (2000–2004).
- Jim Berry, 75, Canadian soccer player (national team), Parkinson's disease and heart failure.
- Robert Blomfield, 82, British street photographer.
- Brian Booth, 85, English cricketer.
- Alpha Boucher, 77, Canadian actor, cancer.
- Don Calhoun, 68, American football player (New England Patriots, Buffalo Bills).
- Demetrios James Caraley, 88, American political scientist.
- Vera Carstairs, 95, British social scientist.
- Paul M. Cook, 96, American businessman, founder of Raychem.
- Eric Freeman, 76, Australian cricketer (South Australia, national team), heart attack.
- Joe Frickleton, 85, Scottish football player (East Stirlingshire) and manager (Highlands Park, Kaizer Chiefs), complications from dementia.
- Segundo Galicia Sánchez, 82, Peruvian professor and sociologist.
- Gérard Houllier, 73, French football manager (Liverpool, Lyon, national team), complications from heart surgery.
- Huang Zongying, 95, Chinese actress (Rhapsody of Happiness, Crows and Sparrows, Women Side by Side).
- Earl Hutto, 94, American politician, member of the U.S. House of Representatives (1979–1995) and Florida House of Representatives (1972–1976).
- Benichandra Jamatia, 90, Indian writer.
- Lamine Khene, 89, Algerian politician.
- Richard Laird, 81, American politician, member of the Alabama House of Representatives (1978–2014), COVID-19.
- Michael F. Land, 78, British neurobiologist.
- Piotr Machalica, 65, Polish actor (Hero of the Year, Dekalog: Nine, A Short Film About Love), COVID-19.
- Tony Morrin, 74, English footballer (Exeter City, Stockport County, Bury).
- Jeannie Morris, 85, American sports journalist (Chicago American, Chicago Daily News) and author, appendix cancer.
- Roddam Narasimha, 87, Indian aerospace engineer and fluid dynamicist, brain hemorrhage.
- Milomir Odović, 65, Bosnian football player (Željezničar Sarajevo, Linz) and manager (Slavija Sarajevo).
- Jack Page, 70, American politician, member of the Alabama House of Representatives (1993–2010), COVID-19.
- Paulo César dos Santos, 68, Brazilian musician (Roupa Nova), complications from COVID-19.
- Günter Sawitzki, 88, German footballer (VfB Stuttgart, national team).
- George Sharples, 77, English footballer (Blackburn Rovers, Everton, Southport), esophageal cancer.
- Hanna Stankówna, 82, Polish actress (The Real End of the Great War, Lokis, The Third Part of the Night).
- Dennis B. Sullivan, 93, American brigadier general.
- José María de la Torre Martín, 68, Mexican Roman Catholic prelate, bishop of Aguascalientes (since 2008), COVID-19.
- Totilas, 20, Dutch dressage horse, world championship winner (2010), colic.
- Darold Treffert, 87, American psychiatrist and research director.
- Seppo Vainio, 83, Finnish Olympic ice hockey player (1960).
- Marcelo Veiga, 56, Brazilian football player (Santos, Internacional) and manager (Bragantino), complications from COVID-19.
- Werner Weckert, 82, Swiss Olympic cyclist.
- Tarcisius Gervazio Ziyaye, 71, Malawian Roman Catholic prelate, archbishop of Lilongwe (since 2001).

=== 15 ===
- John Aldred, 99, English sound engineer (Anne of the Thousand Days, Mary, Queen of Scots, Dr. Strangelove).
- Awesome Again, 26, Canadian Hall of Fame racehorse and sire.
- Ungku Abdul Aziz, 98, Malaysian economist, vice-chancellor of the University of Malaya (1968–1988).
- Irving Banister, 87, American guitarist.
- Anthony Casso, 78, American mobster (Lucchese crime family), COVID-19.
- Caroline Cellier, 75, French actress (This Man Must Die, L'emmerdeur, A Thousand Billion Dollars).
- Sudhir Chakraborty, 86, Indian anthropologist, heart attack.
- Frank Christopherson Jr., 93, American politician, member of the Wisconsin State Assembly (1959–1963) and the Senate (1963–1967).
- Manuel Costas, 78, Spanish footballer (Sevilla FC).
- Orlando Duarte, 88, Brazilian sports journalist, COVID-19.
- Feng Duan, 97, Chinese physicist, member of the Chinese Academy of Sciences and delegate to the National People's Congress (1983–1994).
- Paul Foreman, 81, Jamaican Olympic long jumper (1960), Commonwealth Games gold medalist (1958).
- Donald Fowler, 85, American politician, chair of the Democratic National Committee (1995–1997), leukemia complicated by COVID-19.
- Jorge García, 63, Spanish footballer (Deportivo de La Coruña).
- George Gibbs, 83, British special effects artist (Indiana Jones and the Temple of Doom, Who Framed Roger Rabbit, Alien 3), Oscar winner (1985, 1989).
- Jim Gorst, 98, Canadian politician.
- Alejandro Grullón, 91, Dominican banker.
- Fati Habib-Jawula, 78, Ghanaian diplomat.
- James Havard, 83, American painter.
- Rita Houston, 59, American DJ (WFUV), ovarian cancer.
- Paul Lamey, 81, American Olympic bobsledder (1968, 1972).
- Jean-Pierre Lux, 74, French rugby union player (US Tyrosse, US Dax, national team) and administrator.
- Tom McPherson, 85, American politician.
- Ken Muggleston, 90, Australian set decorator (Oliver!, Waterloo, The Canterbury Tales), Oscar winner (1969).
- Paul Nihill, 81, British race walker, Olympic silver medallist (1964), COVID-19.
- Tommy Ord, 68, English footballer (Rochester Lancers, Vancouver Whitecaps, Seattle Sounders).
- Richie Rome, 90, American record producer.
- Zoltan Sabo, 48, Serbian-Hungarian football player (Vojvodina, Partizan) and manager (Hajduk Kula), pulmonary embolism.
- Noureddine Saïl, 73, Moroccan film critic and writer, COVID-19.
- Bruce Seals, 67, American basketball player (Seattle SuperSonics, Utah Stars).
- Lerrel Sharp, 87, Australian footballer (Collingwood).
- Charles Shere, 85, American composer.
- Petro Slobodyan, 67, Ukrainian football player (Dynamo Kyiv, Soviet Union national team) and manager (Obolon Kyiv).
- Saufatu Sopoanga, 68, Tuvaluan politician, prime minister (2002–2004).
- Deanne Taylor, 74, Canadian actress (Maggie Muggins) and politician.

=== 16 ===
- Yaakov Agmon, 91, Israeli theatre producer, manager and director.
- Gerald L. Alexanderson, 87, American mathematician.
- Ian Armstrong, 83, Australian politician, NSW MP (1981–2007) and deputy premier of New South Wales (1993–1995).
- Waldemaro Bartolozzi, 93, Italian racing cyclist.
- William Beaty Boyd, 97, American academic administrator, president of Central Michigan University (1968–1975) and University of Oregon (1975–1980).
- Emil Cadkin, 100, American composer (The Big Fix, The Killer Shrews).
- Jeff Clayton, 66, American jazz saxophonist, complications from kidney cancer.
- Ray Colfar, 85, English footballer (Crystal Palace, Wimbledon, Headington United).
- Flavio Cotti, 81, Swiss politician, president (1991, 1998) and member of the Federal Council (1986–1999), COVID-19.
- Marcus D'Amico, 55, German-born British actor (Tales of the City, Full Metal Jacket, Superman II), pneumonia.
- Tesfaye Gessesse, 83, Ethiopian actor, general director of the Hager Fikir Theatre (1974–1975).
- Jean Graetz, 90, American civil rights activist, lung cancer.
- Bill Holm, 95, American art historian and author.
- Irfan Husain, 76, Pakistani newspaper columnist (Dawn) and civil servant.
- Steve Ingle, 74, English footballer (Bradford City, Wrexham), COVID-19.
- Peter Yariyok Jatau, 89, Nigerian Roman Catholic prelate, archbishop of Kaduna (1975–2007).
- Lenn Keller, 69, American photographer and archivist, cancer.
- Valentyn Khodukin, 81, Ukrainian football player (Sokil Lviv) and manager (Skala Stryi, Dynamo Lviv).
- Joseph Kyeong Kap-ryong, 90, South Korean Roman Catholic prelate, bishop of Daejeon (1984–2005).
- Leticia Lee, 56, Hong Kong pro-establishment activist, COVID-19.
- Otto Leodolter, 84, Austrian ski jumper, Olympic bronze medalist (1960).
- Carl Mann, 78, American rockabilly singer.
- Elizabeth Meckes, 40, American mathematician, colon cancer.
- Brian Pickworth, 91, New Zealand Olympic fencer (1960).
- Kálmán Sóvári, 79, Hungarian footballer (Újpesti Dózsa, national team).
- Wacław Szybalski, 99, Polish biotechnologist and oncologist.
- Lorenzo Taliaferro, 28, American football player (Baltimore Ravens), heart attack.
- Stephen Tjephe, 65, Burmese Roman Catholic prelate, bishop of Loikaw (since 2015).
- Adela de Torrebiarte, 71, Guatemalan politician, deputy (since 2020), president of the National Football Federation (2016–2017) and minister of the interior (2007–2008), lung cancer.
- Renê Weber, 59, Brazilian football player (Vitória de Guimarães, national team) and manager (Caxias), COVID-19.

=== 17 ===
- Namat Abdullah, 74, Malaysian footballer (Penang, national team), colorectal cancer.
- Franck Balandier, 68, French writer.
- Emmerich Bauer, 93, Austrian Olympic weightlifter.
- Donato Bilancia, 69, Italian serial killer, COVID-19.
- Hacke Björksten, 86, Finnish-Swedish jazz bandleader and saxophonist.
- Paddy Blagden, 85, British army officer.
- Abdelwahab Bouhdiba, 88, Tunisian academic and sociologist.
- Jeremy Bulloch, 75, English actor (Star Wars, The Spy Who Loved Me, Mary, Queen of Scots), complications from Parkinson's disease.
- Krzysztof Bulski, 33, Polish chess player.
- Richard Burchell, 77, American politician, member of the New Hampshire House of Representatives (2012–2014)
- Frank Burnett, 89, American racing driver.
- Pierre Buyoya, 71, Burundian politician, president (1987–1993, 1996–2003), COVID-19.
- Kim Chernin, 80, American feminist writer and poet, COVID-19.
- Stanley Cowell, 79, American jazz pianist, co-founder of Strata-East Records, hypovolemic shock.
- Doug Crane, 85, American animator (He-Man and the Masters of the Universe, The Smurfs, Beavis and Butt-Head Do America), cancer.
- Rod Crewther, 75, Australian physicist.
- Les Dicker, 93, English footballer (Chelmsford City, Tottenham Hotspur, Southend United).
- Allen Dines, 99, American politician, member of the Colorado House of Representatives (1957–1966), Senate (1966–1974) and speaker (1965–1966).
- Enrico Ferri, 78, Italian jurist and politician, minister of public works (1988–1989), deputy (1992–1994) and MEP (1989–2004).
- Jim Fives, 91, Irish hurler and Gaelic footballer.
- Maciej Grubski, 52, Polish politician, senator (2007–2019), COVID-19.
- Arnold D. Gruys, 92, American politician, member of the Minnesota House of Representatives (1967–1971), complications from COVID-19.
- Tom Hanneman, 68, American broadcaster (WCCO-TV, Fox Sports North) and sports commentator (Minnesota Timberwolves).
- Jacó Roberto Hilgert, 94, Brazilian Roman Catholic prelate, bishop of Cruz Alta (1976–2002).
- W. Nathaniel Howell, 81, American diplomat, ambassador to Kuwait (1987–1991).
- John Barnard Jenkins, 87, Welsh nationalist.
- Ejner Jensen, 91, Danish footballer (Vanløse IF, national team).
- Valentin Kasabov, 62, Bulgarian politician, MP (since 2014), COVID-19.
- Hennadiy Kernes, 61, Ukrainian politician, mayor of Kharkiv (since 2010), complications from COVID-19.
- Iqbal Ahmad Khan, 66, Indian classical vocalist.
- Tuncay Mataracı, 85, Turkish politician, minister of customs and monopolies (1978–1979), COVID-19.
- Spencer MacCallum, 88, American anthropologist.
- Dawson McAllister, 74, American radio host and author.
- Leif Mills, 84, British trade unionist, president of the Trades Union Congress (1995), vascular disease.
- Lorraine Monk, 98, Canadian photographer.
- Benny Napoleon, 65, American police officer, sheriff of Wayne County, Michigan (since 2009), complications from COVID-19.
- Ed Nichols, 97, British-born New Zealand Paralympic alpine skier (1980).
- Tim de Paravicini, 75, English audio designer.
- Rod Perry, 86, American actor (S.W.A.T., The Black Godfather, The Black Gestapo).
- Ignaz Puschnik, 86, Austrian footballer (Kapfenberger SV, national team).
- Bob Raudman, 78, American baseball player (Chicago Cubs).
- Harold E. Robinson, 88, American botanist and entomologist.
- Christina Rodrigues, 57, Brazilian actress, complications from COVID-19.
- Giovanni Sacco, 77, Italian footballer (Juventus, Atalanta, Reggiana), COVID-19.
- Freddie Santos, 64, Filipino theatre and concert director.
- Srđan Savić, 89, Bosnian Olympic sprinter (1960).
- R. N. Shetty, 92, Indian entrepreneur and philanthropist, heart attack.
- Satya Deo Singh, 75, Indian politician, MP (1991–1998), cardiac arrest and COVID-19.
- Bolivia Suárez, 63, Venezuelan politician, deputy (since 2016), COVID-19.
- Bill Sveinson, 74, Canadian poker player and politician.
- Pelle Svensson, 77, Swedish wrestler and lawyer, Olympic silver medallist (1964), cancer.

=== 18 ===
- Roger Berlind, 90, American theatre producer (Amadeus, The Book of Mormon, Guys and Dolls), 25-time Tony winner, cardiopulmonary arrest.
- Charlie Brooker, 88, Canadian ice hockey player, Olympic bronze medallist (1956).
- Bill Bullard Jr., 77, American politician, member of the Michigan Senate (1996–2002) and House of Representatives (1983–1996), complications from COVID-19 and cancer.
- Pete Cassidy, 86, American college basketball coach (Cal State Northridge).
- William J. Castagna, 96, American jurist, judge of the U.S. District Court for Middle Florida (since 1979).
- Joan Dougherty, 93, Canadian politician, Quebec MNA (1981–1987), complications from COVID-19.
- Han Grijzenhout, 87, Dutch football manager (Cercle Brugge, Eendracht Aalst, K.A.A. Gent).
- John Harbison, 84, Irish pathologist.
- Armin Hofmann, 100, Swiss graphic designer.
- Michael Jeffery, 83, Australian military officer, governor of Western Australia (1993–2000) and governor-general (2003–2008).
- Eddie Lee Jackson, 71, American politician, member of the Illinois House of Representatives (2009–2017), COVID-19.
- Peter Lamont, 91, British art director and production designer (Goldfinger, Aliens, Titanic), Oscar winner (1998).
- Michał Marusik, 69, Polish politician, MEP (2014–2019).
- Aminul Islam Mintu, 81, Bangladeshi film editor (Goriber Bou, Ajante), COVID-19.
- Peter M. Neumann, 79, British mathematician, COVID-19.
- Rahah Noah, 87, Malaysian socialite, spouse of the deputy prime minister (1957–1970) and of the prime minister (1970–1976).
- John Obiero Nyagarama, 74, Kenyan politician, governor of Nyamira County (since 2013), COVID-19.
- Peter Takeo Okada, 79, Japanese Roman Catholic prelate, archbishop of Tokyo (2000–2017), esophageal cancer.
- José Vicente Rangel, 91, Venezuelan politician, vice president (2002–2007) and minister of foreign affairs (1999–2001), cardiac arrest.
- Òscar Ribas Reig, 84, Andorran politician, prime minister (1982–1984, 1990–1994).
- Jerry Relph, 76, American politician, member of the Minnesota Senate (since 2017), complications from COVID-19.
- Ray Rogers, 89, American politician, member of the Mississippi House of Representatives (1984–2020).
- Aristóteles Sandoval, 46, Mexican politician, Governor of Jalisco (2013–2018), shot.
- Joseph L. Scanlan, 91, American film director.
- Robina Sentongo, Ugandan politician, MP (since 2016), COVID-19.
- Tim Severin, 80, British explorer, historian and writer, cancer.
- Valentin Shurchanov, 73, Russian politician and journalist, deputy (1999–2003, since 2007), COVID-19.
- Victor Snieckus, 83, Lithuanian-born Canadian synthetic organic chemist.
- Sun Weiben, 92, Chinese politician, Communist Party secretary of Liaoning (1982–1985) and Heilongjiang (1985–1994).
- William Winter, 97, American politician, governor (1980–1984) and lieutenant governor of Mississippi (1972–1976), member of the Mississippi House of Representatives (1947–1959).
- Yazid Zerhouni, 83, Tunisian-born Algerian politician.

=== 19 ===
- Shirley Abrahamson, 87, American jurist, justice (1976–2019) and chief justice (1996–2015) of the Wisconsin Supreme Court, pancreatic cancer.
- John Ahern, 86, American politician, member of the Washington House of Representatives (2001–2009, 2011–2013).
- Doc Ayers, 98, American football coach (Piedmont College).
- Art Berglund, 80, American ice hockey coach and executive (national team).
- Anthony Birley, 83, British ancient historian and archaeologist (Vindolanda), lung cancer.
- Peter Boddington, 78, British boxer, COVID-19.
- Mile Bogović, 81, Croatian Roman Catholic prelate, bishop of Gospić-Senj (2000–2016), COVID-19.
- Barbara M. Byrne, 85, Canadian quantitative psychologist.
- Nedo Fiano, 95, Italian writer and Holocaust survivor.
- Joan Milke Flores, 84, American politician, member of the Los Angeles City Council (1983–1993), complications from myelodysplastic syndrome.
- David Giler, 77, American screenwriter (The Parallax View, The Money Pit) and film producer (Alien), cancer.
- Paul Hänni, 93, Swiss Olympic wrestler.
- Kirunda Kivejinja, 85, Ugandan politician, minister of East African Community Affairs (since 2016), COVID-19.
- Rosalind Knight, 87, British actress (Carry On, Tom Jones, Gimme Gimme Gimme).
- Marjan Lazovski, 58, Macedonian basketball player and coach (Vardar, AMAK SP, national team), COVID-19.
- Judith Loganbill, 67, American politician, member of the Kansas House of Representatives (2001–2013).
- Sir Mekere Morauta, 74, Papua New Guinean politician, prime minister (1999–2002), cancer.
- Märta Norberg, 98, Swedish Olympic cross-country skier (1952).
- Leo Panitch, 75, Canadian political philosopher, viral pneumonia from COVID-19.
- Maria Piątkowska, 89, Polish Olympic athlete (1952, 1960, 1964), COVID-19.
- Hermina Pipinić, 92, Croatian actress (Square of Violence, The Steppe, Old Surehand).
- Eileen Pollock, 73, Northern Irish actress (Bread, Far and Away, Angela's Ashes).
- Carmen Quidiello, 105, Cuban-born Dominican playwright and poet, first lady of the Dominican Republic (1963).
- Mohan Rawale, 72, Indian politician, MP (1991–2009).
- Narindar Saroop, 91, Indian-born British businessman.
- Elaine Stack, 89, American judge, justice of the Supreme Court of New York (2000–2008), COVID-19.
- Margaret Tebbit, Lady Tebbit, 86, English nurse.
- Themie Thomai, 75, Albanian politician, minister of agriculture (1975–1989), COVID-19.
- Alberto Valdés Jr., 70, Mexican equestrian, Olympic bronze medallist (1980).
- Bram van der Vlugt, 86, Dutch actor (Pastorale 1943, Tropic of Emerald, Family), COVID-19.
- Elmar Zeitler, 93, German physicist.

=== 20 ===
- Samsuddin Ahmed, 75, Bangladeshi politician, MP (2001–2006), COVID-19.
- Raymon Anning, 90, British police officer, commissioner of police of Hong Kong (1985–1989).
- Doug Anthony, 90, Australian politician, deputy prime minister (1971–1972, 1975–1983) and MP (1957–1984).
- Anthony Banzi, 74, Tanzanian Roman Catholic prelate, bishop of Tanga (since 1994).
- Nicette Bruno, 87, Brazilian actress (Sétimo Sentido, Louco Amor, Perigosas Peruas), complications from COVID-19.
- Arthur Campbell, 95, New Zealand analytical chemist.
- Zee Edgell, 80, Belizean-born American novelist, cancer.
- Bill Groethe, 97, American photographer.
- Billy Harris, 77, American baseball player (Cleveland Indians, Kansas City Royals).
- Svatopluk Karásek, 78, Czech Evangelical priest, politician, and dissident (Charter 77), deputy (2002–2006).
- Gogi Kavtaradze, 80, Georgian actor (Don't Grieve, Melodies of Vera Quarter, Wounded Game).
- David Knight, 92, American actor (The Newcomers).
- Delfino López Aparicio, 60, Mexican politician, deputy (since 2018), COVID-19.
- Susan Moore, 52, American physician, complications from COVID-19.
- Monzur-I-Mowla, 80, Bangladeshi poet, director general of the Bangla Academy (1982–1986), COVID-19.
- Inés Moreno, 88, Argentine actress (Behind a Long Wall).
- Florencio Olvera Ochoa, 87, Mexican Roman Catholic prelate, bishop of Cuernavaca (2002–2009).
- Rukhshana, 80, Afghan singer.
- Nasser Sabah Al-Ahmad Al-Sabah, 72, Kuwaiti royal, minister of defense (2017–2019).
- Yvonne Sandberg-Fries, 70, Swedish politician, MEP (2003–2004), MR (1982–1996).
- Julius Schachter, 84, American microbiologist, COVID-19.
- Chad Stuart, 79, English musician (Chad & Jeremy), pneumonia.
- Romolo Tavoni, 94, Italian motor racing executive (Ferrari).
- Richard Vande Hoef, 95, American politician, member of the Iowa Senate (1981–1993) and House of Representatives (1993–1999).
- Ezra Vogel, 90, American scholar (Japan as Number One: Lessons for America, Deng Xiaoping and the Transformation of China), complications from surgery.
- Lee Wallace, 90, American actor (Batman, Private Benjamin, The Taking of Pelham One Two Three).
- Dame Fanny Waterman, 100, English pianist, founder of the Leeds International Piano Competition.
- Dietrich Weise, 86, German football player (Neckarsulm) and manager (Eintracht Frankfurt, Egypt national team).
- Peter Williams, 81, British motorcycle racer.
- Ned Wynn, 79, American actor (The Bellboy, Bikini Beach, Beach Blanket Bingo), complications from Parkinson's disease.

=== 21 ===
- Hank Adams, 77, American Native American rights activist.
- Ronald Anderson, 79, American sociologist.
- Mark Appelbaum, 79, American psychologist, complications from COVID-19.
- Boris Bushmelev, 83, Russian film director (The Evening Labyrinth).
- Urso Chappell, 53, American graphic designer and world's fair historian, cirrhosis.
- Ikenwoli Godfrey Emiko, 65, Nigerian traditional ruler, olu of Warri (since 2015), COVID-19.
- Gilberto Ensástiga, 57, Mexican politician, MP (2003–2006), COVID-19.
- John Fitzpatrick, 74, Scottish footballer (Manchester United).
- Donald A. S. Fraser, 95, Canadian statistician.
- Tadeusz Górczyk, 59, Polish politician and journalist, deputy (1991–1993).
- Sandy Grant Gordon, 89, Scottish distiller (Glenfiddich).
- Kevin Greene, 58, American Hall of Fame football player (Pittsburgh Steelers, Los Angeles Rams) and coach (Green Bay Packers), heart attack.
- Dorothy Henry, 95, American newspaper artist and cartoonist.
- Sir John Hills, 66, British social scientist, cancer.
- Aleksandr Kurlyandsky, 82, Russian screenwriter (Well, Just You Wait!) and author.
- Tommie Lindström, 82, Swedish Olympic swimmer (1960).
- Hamish McLachlan, 53, Australian Olympic rower (1988) and stock market fraudster.
- Julian Moti, 55, Fijian-born Australian lawyer, attorney general of Solomon Islands (2006–2006, 2007–2007).
- K. T. Oslin, 78, American country singer-songwriter ("80's Ladies", "Do Ya", "I'll Always Come Back"), Grammy winner (1988, 1989), COVID-19.
- Kalsoom Perveen, 75, Pakistani politician, senator (since 2003), COVID-19.
- Terry Petris, 59, American racing driver.
- Richard Rominger, 93, American politician, heart attack.
- Skulu, 47, American Samoan professional wrestler.
- Karel Vachek, 80, Czech documentary film director and FAMU educator.
- Motilal Vora, 92, Indian politician, minister of health and family welfare (1988–1989), MP (2002–2020) and CM of Madhya Pradesh (1985–1988, 1989), complications from COVID-19.
- Eleanor Wadsworth, 103, English aviator.
- Sir Arnold Wolfendale, 93, British astronomer, Astronomer Royal (1991–1995).

=== 22 ===
- Karima Baloch, 37, Pakistani human rights activist.
- Joachim Bäse, 81, German footballer (Eintracht Braunschweig, West Germany national team).
- Wojciech Borowik, 64, Polish politician, Solidarity activist, deputy (1993–1997), COVID-19.
- Claude Brasseur, 84, French actor (Bande à part, Such a Gorgeous Kid Like Me, A Simple Story).
- Norma Cappagli, 81, Argentine model, Miss World (1960), traffic collision.
- Pierre Chappuis, 90, Swiss poet.
- Edmund M. Clarke, 75, American computer scientist, COVID-19.
- James D. Fowler, 86, American politician.
- Ed Gomes, 84, American politician, member of the Connecticut State Senate (2005–2013, 2015–2019), injuries sustained in a traffic collision.
- Leo Goodman, 92, American statistician, COVID-19.
- Kevin Hartley, 86, Australian amateur golfer.
- Earle Hilgert, 97, American academic theologian.
- Erkki Hytönen, 87, Finnish Olympic ice hockey player (1952).
- H. L. Jensen, 91, American politician.
- Bonnie Ladwig, 81, American politician, member of the Wisconsin State Assembly (1993–2005), COVID-19.
- Lam Phương, 83, Vietnamese-American songwriter, complications from a stroke.
- Jack Lenor Larsen, 93, American textile designer.
- Paul Loridant, 72, French politician, mayor of Les Ulis (1977–2001).
- Ron Lurie, 79, American politician, mayor of Las Vegas (1987–1991), COVID-19.
- John Maltby, 84, English sculptor and potter.
- Muhammad Mustafa Mero, 79, Syrian politician, prime minister (2000–2003), COVID-19.
- Phil Rogers, 69, Welsh studio potter.
- George Spriggs, 83, American baseball player (Pittsburgh Pirates, Kansas City Royals).
- Özkan Sümer, 80, Turkish football player (Trabzonspor) and manager (Galatasaray, national team).
- Stella Tennant, 50, British model, suicide.
- Rubén Tierrablanca González, 68, Mexican-born Turkish Roman Catholic prelate, apostolic vicariate of Istanbul (since 2016), COVID-19.
- Tuck Tucker, 59, American animator (Hey Arnold!, SpongeBob SquarePants, The Simpsons).
- Antonio Vacca, 86, Italian Roman Catholic prelate, bishop of Alghero-Bosa (1993–2006), throat cancer.
- Jay Walljasper, 65, American writer and editor, kidney cancer.
- Alan Warren, 88, English priest.
- Dwight Wise, 90, American politician.

=== 23 ===
- Arkady Andreasyan, 73, Armenian football player (Ararat Yerevan, Soviet Union national team) and manager (Homenmen Beirut), Olympic bronze medallist (1972).
- Lars Arge, 53, Danish computer scientist, kidney cancer.
- Irani Barbosa, 70, Brazilian politician, deputy (1991–1995), COVID-19.
- Charles Campion, 69, English food critic (The Times, The Independent, MasterChef).
- Desmond Carnelley, 91, English archdeacon.
- Richard N. Cooper, 86, American economist.
- John Edrich, 83, English cricketer (Norfolk, Surrey, national team), Waldenström's macroglobulinemia.
- James E. Gunn, 97, American science fiction author (The Road to Science Fiction, Star Bridge, The Listeners).
- Lyle Hanson, 85, American politician, member of the North Dakota House of Representatives (1979–2012).
- Yehuda Henkin, 75, Israeli Orthodox rabbi and posek.
- Mannan Hira, 64, Bangladeshi playwright and film director, heart attack.
- Issaka Assane Karanta, 75, Nigerien politician, Mayor of Commune I (1996–1999) and Commune III (2010–2011) of Niamey, governor of Niamey Capital District (since 2018), COVID-19.
- Pero Kvrgić, 93, Croatian actor (Ne daj se, Floki, All for Free, Nausikaya).
- Lonnie Laffen, 62, American politician, member of the North Dakota Senate (2010–2018), heart attack.
- Rebecca Luker, 59, American actress (Mary Poppins, Show Boat, Not Fade Away), complications from amyotrophic lateral sclerosis.
- Makosso IV, 76, Congolese royal, king of Loango (since 2009).
- Santé Marcuzzi, 86, French Olympic rower (1956).
- Eddie McLaren, 91, Scottish footballer (Reading).
- Dave McNary, 69, American film journalist (Variety), complications from a stroke.
- Mićo Mićić, 64, Bosnian politician, mayor of Bijeljina (since 2004), COVID-19.
- Brian Morrison, 82, Australian footballer (Richmond).
- Loyiso Mpumlwana, South African politician, member of the National Assembly (2014–2019, since 2020), COVID-19.
- Rei Nakanishi, 82, Japanese novelist and songwriter, heart attack.
- Kay Purcell, 57, English actress (Emmerdale, Tracy Beaker Returns, Waterloo Road), liver cancer.
- Frankie Randall, 59, American boxer, WBC light welterweight champion (1994–1996).
- Madan Lal Sharma, 68, Indian politician, MP (2004–2014).
- Gilbert Shea, 92, American tennis player.
- Sugathakumari, 86, Indian poet and social activist, COVID-19.
- Swami Sundaranand, 94, Indian yogi, photographer, and mountaineer.
- Monika Tilley, 86, Austrian-born American fashion designer.
- Jack Van Mark, 90, American politician.
- Leslie West, 75, American singer and guitarist (Mountain, West, Bruce and Laing, The Vagrants), heart attack.
- Ron Widby, 75, American basketball and football player (Dallas Cowboys, Green Bay Packers).
- Joel Yanofsky, 65, Canadian novelist, cancer.
- Rika Zaraï, 82, Israeli singer and writer.

=== 24 ===
- Mouloud Achour, 76, Algerian writer.
- Mitsumasa Anno, 94, Japanese children's author and illustrator (All in a Day), cirrhosis.
- Mohamad Aziz, 80, Malaysian politician, MP (1999–2013) and Johor State MLA (1986–1999), kidney failure.
- Ben Binnendijk, 93, Dutch Olympic rower (1952).
- Benedicto Bravo, 58, Mexican footballer (Club León, Unión de Curtidores), COVID-19.
- Carl Olaf Bue Jr., 98, American jurist, judge of the U.S. District Court for Southern Texas (since 1970).
- Michael J. Byrne, 79, Australian physician.
- Dick Cardinal, 93, American professional wrestler.
- Vince Carillot, 93, American football coach.
- Roland Cedermark, 82, Swedish musician.
- Hubert Chesshyre, 80, British officer of arms, Clarenceux king of arms (1997–2010).
- John Cremona, 102, Maltese civil servant, chief justice (1971–1981) and acting president (1976).
- Braswell Deen Jr., 95, American politician.
- Ernie Duplechin, 88, American football coach (Basile HS, Eunice HS) and athletics administrator (McNeese State).
- Catherine Ennis, 65, English organist, cancer.
- Ivry Gitlis, 98, Israeli violinist.
- M. A. Hashem, 78, Bangladeshi businessman (Partex Group) and politician, MP (2001–2006), COVID-19.
- Danny Hodge, 88, American Hall of Fame wrestler (NWA) and boxer, Olympic silver medallist (1956), complications from Alzheimer's disease.
- AKM Jahangir Hossain, 66, Bangladeshi politician, MP (1991–2008, since 2014), complications from COVID-19.
- Aleksandar Ivoš, 89, Serbian footballer (Vojvodina, K. Beringen F.C., Yugoslavia national team).
- Milorad Janković, 80, Serbian footballer (Radnički Niš, Yugoslavia national team).
- Pir Noor Muhammad Shah Jeelani, 69, Pakistani politician, MNA (since 2013), COVID-19.
- Freshta Kohistani, 29, Afghan women's rights activist, shot.
- Ahmed Lemu, 91, Nigerian Islamic scholar and jurist.
- William Magee, 81, American politician, member of the New York State Assembly (1991–2018).
- B. J. Marsh, 80, American politician, member of the Missouri House of Representatives (1989–1993, 2001–2009), complications from COVID-19.
- Vincent Mhlanga, Swazi politician, acting prime minister (2018), COVID-19.
- Bernard Mvondo-Etoga, 37, Cameroonian Olympic judoka (2004).
- Jack Myers, 96, American football player (Philadelphia Eagles).
- Adramé Ndiaye, 62, Senegalese Olympic basketball player (1980), COVID-19.
- Idongesit Nkanga, 68, Nigerian air officer and politician, COVID-19.
- Hans-Sigfrid Oberer, 87, Swiss Olympic cross-country skier.
- Tho. Paramasivan, 69, Indian anthropologist, complications from diabetes.
- Thomas W. Parks, 81, American electrical engineer.
- Burt Pugach, 93, American lawyer and convicted felon.
- Armando Romero, 60, Mexican footballer (Cruz Azul, Club Toluca, Correcaminos UAT), complications from COVID-19.
- Benhur Salimbangon, 75, Filipino politician, member of the House of Representatives (2007–2019), cancer.
- Mojmir Sepe, 90, Slovenian composer ("Brez besed", "Pridi, dala ti bom cvet", "The Earth is Dancing") and conductor.
- Guy N. Smith, 81, British horror writer.
- Davie Sneddon, 84, Scottish footballer (Kilmarnock, Preston North End, Raith Rovers).
- Geoff Stephens, 86, English songwriter ("Sorry Suzanne", "Daughter of Darkness", "You Won't Find Another Fool Like Me") and record producer.
- Siv Widerberg, 89, Swedish writer and journalist.

=== 25 ===
- Michael Alig, 54, American club promoter and convicted killer, heroin overdose.
- Djalma Bastos de Morais, 83, Brazilian politician, minister of communications (1993–1995) and president of CEMIG (1999–2015), COVID-19.
- William Bentsen, 90, American Olympic sailing champion (1972).
- Brian Binley, 78, British politician, MP (2005–2015).
- Ivan Bogdan, 92, Ukrainian wrestler, Olympic champion (1960).
- Albert Boggess, 91, American astronomer.
- Soumaïla Cissé, 71, Malian politician, MP (since 2013) and minister of finance (1993–2000), COVID-19.
- Chico Ejiro, Nigerian film producer and director, seizure.
- Shamsur Rahman Faruqi, 85, Indian poet and literary critic.
- Reginald Foster, 81, American Roman Catholic priest and Latinist, complications from COVID-19.
- Antonio Gento, 80, Spanish footballer (Racing de Santander, Real Oviedo).
- Rich Herrin, 87, American college basketball coach (SIUC, Morthland College).
- Tomás Irribarra, 85, Chilean politician, mayor of Quirihue (1992–1996, 2008–2012) and deputy (1969–1973).
- Robin Jackman, 75, English cricketer (Surrey, Rhodesia, national team), complications from COVID-19.
- K. C. Jones, 88, American Hall of Fame basketball player and coach (Boston Celtics, Washington Bullets), Olympic champion (1956) and NBA champion (1959–1966, 1984, 1986).
- Ty Jordan, 19, American college football player (University of Utah), shot.
- Jamal Khwaja, 92, Indian philosopher and politician, MP (1957–1962).
- Martin Lambie-Nairn, 75, English graphic designer (BBC, Channel 4).
- Carlos Levy, 78, Argentine writer, narrator and editor, COVID-19.
- Lin Qi, 39, Chinese entrepreneur, founder of Yoozoo Games, poisoning.
- Barry Lopez, 75, American author (Arctic Dreams), prostate cancer.
- Edgar Meddings, 97, British Olympic bobsledder (1948).
- Genevieve Musci, 106, American internet celebrity (Gramma and Ginga).
- Anil Nedumangad, 48, Indian actor (Janaadhipan, Ayyappanum Koshiyum, Paapam Cheyyathavar Kalleriyatte), drowned.
- Engin Nurşani, 36, Turkish-German folk musician, lung infection and cancer.
- Jaan Rääts, 88, Estonian composer.
- Tony Rice, 69, American Hall of Fame bluegrass guitarist (New South, David Grisman Quintet, Bluegrass Album Band).
- Barbara Rose, 84, American art historian, breast cancer.
- Mahmoud Shakir, 85, Iraqi Olympic weightlifter.
- Arne Skotte, 70, Swedish footballer.
- David Thorns, 77, British-born New Zealand sociologist.
- Maksim Tsyhalka, 37, Belarusian footballer (Dinamo-Juni Minsk, Dinamo Minsk, national team).
- Scott Vermillion, 44, American soccer player (Kansas City Wizards, Colorado Rapids), acute alcohol and prescription drug poisoning.

=== 26 ===
- Derek Aucoin, 50, Canadian baseball player (Montreal Expos), brain cancer.
- Milka Babović, 92, Croatian sprinter, hurdler and journalist, COVID-19.
- Eddie Blair, 93, Scottish jazz trumpeter
- George Blake, 98, British spy and double agent.
- Bob Callahan, 83, American-born Canadian politician.
- Leslie D. Campbell Jr., 95, American politician.
- George Robert Carruthers, 81, American physicist and inventor.
- Víctor Cuica, 71, Venezuelan saxophonist and actor.
- Pat Childers, 79, American politician, member of the Wyoming House of Representatives (1997–2013).
- Harper Davis, 95, American football player (Mississippi State Bulldogs, Green Bay Packers, Chicago Bears).
- Johnson Gicheru, 79, Kenyan judge, chief justice (2003–2011).
- Patrick Harris, 86, English bishop.
- Kadambur R. Janarthanan, 91, Indian politician, MP (1984–1996, 1998–1999).
- Railey Jeffrey, 75, Malaysian politician, MP (1986–2004).
- Phil Jones, 74, American football coach (Shorter).
- Abdul Kader, 69, Bangladeshi actor (Kothao Keu Nei), cancer.
- Bronisława Kowalska, 65, Polish politician and political scientist, deputy (1993–2005), MEP (2004), COVID-19.
- Sir Peter Lachmann, 89, British immunologist.
- Brodie Lee, 41, American professional wrestler (AEW, WWE, ROH), idiopathic pulmonary fibrosis.
- Govind Prasad Lohani, 93, Nepali diplomat and economist, respiratory failure.
- Theodore Lumpkin, 100, American pilot (Tuskegee Airmen), complications from COVID-19.
- Jim McLean, 83, Scottish football player (Clyde, Hamilton Academical) and manager (Dundee United), complications from dementia.
- Chic McLelland, 67, Scottish football player (Aberdeen, Motherwell) and manager (Montrose).
- John Miller, 88, British journalist and author.
- Aubrey Mokoape, 76, South African anti-apartheid activist, COVID-19.
- Gilbert Naccache, 81, Tunisian writer and far-left militant.
- Cirilo Nelson, 82, Honduran botanist.
- Phil Niekro, 81, American Hall of Fame baseball player (Atlanta Braves, New York Yankees, Cleveland Indians), cancer.
- Maximiliano Pereira, 27, Uruguayan footballer (Miramar Misiones, Racing de Montevideo, Sport Boys), drowned.
- Sergio Pintor, 83, Italian Roman Catholic prelate, bishop of Ozieri (2006–2012).
- Tito Rojas, 65, Puerto Rican salsa singer, heart attack.
- Gregorio Salvador Caja, 93, Spanish linguist.
- Nomvuzo Shabalala, 60, South African politician, MP (since 2018), COVID-19-related illness.
- Bill Sheridan, 78, American basketball coach.
- Peter Schmidhuber, 89, German politician, deputy (1965–1969, 1972–1978).
- John Sedensky, 85, American politician, member of the New Hampshire House of Representatives (2008–2014)
- William Starr, 97, American violinist.
- Vic Stelly, 79, American politician, member of the Louisiana House of Representatives (1989–2005), COVID-19.
- Mike Sutton, 76, English footballer (Norwich City, Chester, Carlisle United), complications from dementia.
- Shirley Young, 85, American businesswoman.

=== 27 ===
- Rolf Aggestam, 79, Swedish poet and translator.
- Anthony J. Batten, 80, British-born Canadian visual artist.
- Arthur Berckmans, 91, Belgian comics author (Sammy).
- Maria Gąsienica Bukowa-Kowalska, 84, Polish Olympic cross-country skier (1956).
- José Luiz Carbone, 74, Brazilian football player (Internacional, national team) and manager (Fluminense), liver cancer.
- Jerry Coody, 89, American football player (Calgary Stampeders).
- Florentino Domínguez Ordóñez, 58, Mexican politician, deputy (2003–2006), COVID-19.
- Colin Falck, 86, British literary critic and poet.
- Gus Ferguson, 80, Scottish-born South African poet and cartoonist.
- Ed Finn, 94, Canadian politician and trade unionist.
- Giorgio Galli, 92, Italian historian and political analyst.
- Yuichiro Hata, 53, Japanese politician, minister of land, infrastructure, transport and tourism (2012) and member of the House of Councillors (since 1999), COVID-19.
- Marian Jochman, 85, Polish Olympic long-distance runner (1960).
- Roberto Junguito, 77, Colombian economist, diplomat and politician, minister of finance and public credit (2002–2003) and of agriculture and rural development (1983–1984).
- Mustafa Kandıralı, 90, Turkish clarinetist.
- Sunil Kothari, 87, Indian dance historian, cardiac arrest.
- Saidu Kumo, 61, Nigerian politician, COVID-19.
- Vikram Lall, Indian architect.
- Li Guang, 106, Chinese military officer, founding major general of the PLA.
- William Link, 87, American television writer (Murder, She Wrote, Columbo, Mannix), Emmy winner (1970), heart failure.
- Manukura, 9, New Zealand North Island brown kiwi (hatched 2011).
- Klavio Meça, 24, Albanian swimmer.
- Mieczysław Morański, 60, Polish actor (Na dobre i na złe, Na Wspólnej, Plebania), COVID-19.
- Ladislav Mrkvička, 81, Czech actor (Atentát, Thirty Cases of Major Zeman), Thalia Award and Czech Lion winner.
- Gunga Mwinga, 45, Kenyan politician, MP (2013–2017).
- Mohamed El Ouafa, 72, Moroccan diplomat and politician, ambassador to India (2000–2004), Iran (2004–2006), and Brazil (2006–2012), minister of education (2012–2013), COVID-19.
- Loyd Phillips, 75, American Hall of Fame football player (Arkansas Razorbacks, Chicago Bears).
- Zbigniew Pocialik, 75, Polish footballer (KS Warszawianka, Gwardia Warsaw, Beveren).
- Germán Rama, 88, Uruguayan historian and academic.
- Osvaldo Rivera Cianchini, 80, Puerto Rican judge, COVID-19.
- Zouheïra Salem, 80, Tunisian singer.
- Harold Spinka, 75, American particle physicist.
- Seymour Van Gundy, 89, American nematologist.
- Ken Unwin, 94, English archdeacon.
- Antonio Velasco Piña, 85, Mexican novelist, spiritual writer and essayist.
- D. Yasodha, 74, Indian politician, Tamil Nadu MLA (1980–1989, 2001–2011).

=== 28 ===
- Arun Alexander, 47, Indian actor (Maanagaram, Kolamavu Kokila, Master), heart attack.
- Csaba Ali, 74, Hungarian Olympic swimmer (1964).
- Jack Arthurs, 98, American politician, member of the Pennsylvania House of Representatives (1971–1978).
- Marc Basnight, 73, American politician, President pro tempore (1993–2011) and member (1985–2011) of the North Carolina Senate, progressive bulbar palsy.
- John R. Bentson, 83, American neuroradiologist, complications from COVID-19.
- Moshe Brawer, 101, Israeli geographer.
- Romell Broom, 64, American convicted murderer, COVID-19.
- Johnny Clark, 73, British boxer, European bantamweight champion (1973).
- Othón Cuevas Córdova, 55, Mexican politician, deputy (2006–2009), COVID-19.
- S. L. Dharmegowda, 65, Indian politician, deputy chairman of the Karnataka Legislative Council (since 2018), suicide by train.
- Paul-Heinz Dittrich, 90, German composer.
- Tom Docherty, 96, English footballer (Lincoln City, Newport County).
- Jean-Marc Forneri, 61, French financier, heart attack.
- Fou Ts'ong, 86, Chinese-born British pianist, COVID-19.
- H. Jack Geiger, 95, American physician.
- Christopher Greet, 88, Sri Lankan-born British actor (Dinnerladies, The Infinite Worlds of H. G. Wells, Prince of Persia: The Sands of Time).
- Paul Sueo Hamaguchi, 72, Japanese Roman Catholic prelate, bishop of Oita (since 2011).
- Jyrki Heliskoski, 75, Finnish football coach (HJK, national team).
- Paul Heller, 93, American film producer (Enter the Dragon, The Wilby Conspiracy, The Pack).
- George Hudson, 83, English footballer (Peterborough United, Coventry City, Tranmere Rovers).
- Roy B. B. Janis, 63, Indonesian politician, MP (1992–1997, 1999–2005).
- Valentin Lazarov, 89, Bulgarian Hall of Fame basketball referee.
- Armando Manzanero, 85, Mexican singer-songwriter ("Somos Novios (It's Impossible)", "Mía", "Adoro"), Grammy winner (2014), COVID-19.
- Frank Hampton McFadden, 95, American jurist, judge (1969–1982) and chief judge (1973–1982) of the U.S. District Court for Northern Alabama.
- David Medalla, 82, Filipino sculptor.
- Luis Enrique Mercado, 68, Mexican writer, journalist (El Economista) and politician, deputy (2009–2012), COVID-19.
- Cy McClairen, 89, American football player (Pittsburgh Steelers), coach (Bethune-Cookman) and administrator.
- Nolan Mettetal, 75, American politician, member of the Mississippi State Senate (1996–2012) and House of Representatives (2012–2020), COVID-19.
- Mamadou Niang, 81–82, Senegalese military officer and politician, Minister of the Interior.
- Wilma Pelly, 83, Canadian actress (North of 60, Fargo, Mixed Blessings).
- John Fulton Reid, 64, New Zealand cricketer (Auckland, national team).
- Madelyn Reiter, 78, American politician, member of the Minnesota Senate (2001–2007).
- Les Riggs, 85, English football player (Gillingham, Newport County) and manager (Margate).
- Adele Rose, 87, English television writer (Coronation Street, Z-Cars, Byker Grove), pneumonia.
- Arianna W. Rosenbluth, 93, American physicist, complications from COVID-19.
- Mahinder Watsa, 96, Indian sexologist.
- Colin Withers, 80, English footballer (Birmingham City, Aston Villa).
- Zou Deci, 86, Chinese engineer, member of the Chinese Academy of Engineering.

=== 29 ===
- Hatem Ali, 58, Syrian television director (Salah Al-deen Al-Ayyobi, Seraa Ala El Remal, Omar) and actor, heart attack.
- Claude Bolling, 90, French jazz pianist and composer (Suite for Flute and Jazz Piano Trio).
- David Britton, 75, British author and publisher (Meng and Ecker).
- Jessica Campbell, 38, American actress (Election).
- Pierre Cardin, 98, French-Italian fashion designer.
- Richard Choruma, 42, Zimbabwean footballer (Highlanders, Bloemfontein Celtic, national team), kidney failure.
- Joe Louis Clark, 82, American school principal, subject of Lean on Me.
- Hugh Davidson, 92, American football player (Colorado Buffaloes), coach (Montana Grizzlies), and head scout (Denver Broncos).
- Josefina Echánove, 93, Mexican actress (El hombre de los hongos, The Children of Sanchez, Cabeza de Vaca), model and journalist.
- Norman Golb, 92, American Semitics scholar.
- Agitu Ideo Gudeta, 42, Ethiopian goat breeder and activist, beaten.
- Miguel Ángel Gutiérrez Machado, 60, Mexican politician, deputy (2003–2006), COVID-19.
- James Hardy, 64, American basketball player (Utah Jazz, Udinese, Olympique Antibes), heart attack.
- Arne A. Jensen, 66, Norwegian media and corporate executive, CEO of TV 2 (1993–1999) and Braathens (1999–2001).
- Michael Julien, 93, British songwriter ("Let's Live for Today", "Kiss Me, Honey Honey, Kiss Me", "Boom Bang-a-Bang"), COVID-19.
- Dzhambulat Khatokhov, 21, Russian sumo wrestler and record holder, world's heaviest child, kidney failure.
- Yevheniia Kucherenko, 98, Ukrainian pedagogue.
- Alexi Laiho, 41, Finnish death metal singer-songwriter and guitarist (Children of Bodom, Sinergy, The Local Band), alcohol-related cirrhosis and pancreatitis.
- Joey LaMotta, 95, American boxer and manager.
- Amelia Lapeña-Bonifacio, 90, Filipino puppeteer, National Artist of the Philippines.
- Luke Letlow, 41, American politician, U.S. Representative-elect, complications from COVID-19.
- Hugh X. Lewis, 90, American country singer, complications from COVID-19.
- Gösta Linderholm, 79, Swedish singer and composer (Rasmus på luffen), stroke.
- Elaine McCoy, 74, Canadian politician, Senator (since 2005) and Alberta MLA (1986–1993).
- Phyllis McGuire, 89, American singer (The McGuire Sisters).
- Simo Mfayela, South African politician, member of the National Council of Provinces (since 2019).
- Nikhil Nandy, 88, Indian Olympic footballer (1956).
- Jerry O'Riordan, 81, Irish Gaelic footballer (Glenbeigh-Glencar, Kerry).
- Gregory Ochiagha, 89, Nigerian Roman Catholic prelate, bishop of Orlu (1980–2008).
- Corrado Olmi, 94, Italian actor and comedian (Wake Up and Die, Scandal in the Family, Madly in Love), COVID-19.
- Daniel S. Paletko, 70, American politician, mayor of Dearborn Heights, Michigan (since 2004), member of the Michigan House of Representatives (2003–2004), COVID-19.
- Serafim Papakostas, 61, Greek Orthodox prelate, metropolitan of Kastoria (since 1996), COVID-19.
- John Paul Jr., 60, American racing driver and convicted criminal, Huntington's disease.
- Geoffrey Robinson, 83, Australian Roman Catholic prelate, auxiliary bishop of Sydney (1984–2004).
- Vincenzo Rosito, 81, Italian footballer (Potenza, Pistoiese, Mantova).
- Howard J. Rubenstein, 88, American lawyer and public relations expert.
- Rudy Salas, 71, American musician (El Chicano, Tierra).
- Shabba Doo, 65, American dancer (The Lockers) and actor (Breakin', Breakin' 2: Electric Boogaloo).
- Luigi Snozzi, 88, Swiss architect, COVID-19.
- Jeanine Toulouse, 97, French Olympic sprinter (1948).
- Tommy Turtle, 70, British soldier, cancer.
- Jean Valentine, 86, American poet, New York State Poet Laureate (2008–2010), complications from Alzheimer's disease.
- Indira Joseph Venniyoor, 94, Indian broadcaster (All India Radio).
- Kees Verkade, 79, Dutch sculptor and artist.
- John Waine, 90, English bishop.
- Sofia Zhukova, 81, Russian serial killer, COVID-19.

=== 30 ===
- Aldo Andretti, 80, Italian-born American racing driver, COVID-19.
- Guillem Areny, 89, Andorran politician, mayor of La Massana (1962–1963) and member of the Council General (1966–1969, 1974–1981).
- Ronald Atkins, 104, British politician, MP (1966–1970, 1974–1979).
- Brenda Banks, 72, American animator (King of the Hill, The Lord of the Rings, The Smurfs).
- Ivan Baumgartner, 86, Australian footballer.
- Bob Bessoir, 88, American college basketball coach (Scranton Royals).
- George Blasse, 86, Dutch chemist.
- Jos Compaan, 62, Dutch Olympic rower (1980, 1984, 1988).
- Josep Corominas i Busqueta, 81, Spanish doctor and politician, deputy (1989–2000) and grand master of the Grand Lodge of Spain (2002–2006).
- Peter Craze, 74, British actor (Doctor Who).
- Seaman Dan, 91, Australian musician.
- Eugene Peyton Deatrick, 96, American Air Force colonel and test pilot.
- Grace L. Drake, 94, American politician, member of the Ohio Senate (1984–2000).
- Robert A. Frosch, 92, American scientist, administrator of NASA (1977–1981).
- Gaztelu, 74, Spanish footballer (Real Sociedad).
- Andrew Han Jingtao, 99, Chinese Roman Catholic clandestine prelate, bishop of Sipingjie (since 1982).
- Barry Kay, 81, British immunologist.
- Frank Kimbrough, 64, American post-bop jazz pianist.
- Samuel Little, 80, American serial killer.
- Milan Lučanský, 51, Slovak police general, president of the Slovak Police Force (2018–2020), suicide by hanging.
- Yehoshua Matza, 89, Israeli politician, member of the Knesset (1984–2002).
- Metin Orgarun, 60, Turkish Olympic judoka (1984).
- Panusunan Pasaribu, 74, Indonesian civil servant and politician, regent of Central Tapanuli (1995–2001).
- Stephen Prince, 65, American film critic and historian.
- Alto Reed, 72, American saxophonist (Bob Seger and the Silver Bullet Band, Little Feat, Grand Funk Railroad), colon cancer.
- LaWanna Shurtliff, 85, American politician, member of the Utah House of Representatives (1999–2008, since 2019), pneumonia.
- Lois Sasson, 80, American jewelry designer and gay rights activist, complications from COVID-19.
- Alexander Spirin, 89, Russian biochemist.
- Victor Stacey, 76, Irish Church of Ireland clergyman, dean of St Patrick's Cathedral, Dublin (2012–2016).
- Gennady Strakhov, 76, Russian freestyle wrestler, Olympic silver medalist (1972), COVID-19.
- Anton Strout, 50, American author and podcaster.
- Dawn Wells, 82, American actress (Gilligan's Island, The Town That Dreaded Sundown, Return to Boggy Creek), COVID-19.
- Richard Gilbert West, 94, British botanist and geologist.
- Eugene Wright, 97, American jazz bassist (The Dave Brubeck Quartet).
- Ann Zahn, 89, American printmaker.

=== 31 ===
- Constantin Bosânceanu, 54, Romanian footballer (Bucovina Suceava, Oțelul Galați, Rocar București).
- Jeremy Burnham, 89, British television actor and screenwriter.
- Ralph C. Capparelli, 96, American politician, member of the Illinois House of Representatives (1971–2004).
- John Cardos, 91, American film director (Kingdom of the Spiders, Outlaw of Gor, The Day Time Ended) and actor.
- Slavoj Černý, 83, Czech Olympic cyclist.
- Maxine Cheshire, 90, American journalist (The Washington Post), cardiovascular disease.
- Tommy Docherty, 92, Scottish football player (Preston North End) and manager (Chelsea, national team).
- Paul Etiang, 82, Ugandan politician, deputy prime minister (1996–1999), COVID-19.
- Jolanta Fedak, 60, Polish politician, minister of family, labour and social policy (2007–2011) and member of the Sejm (since 2019), cancer.
- Ernesto Gismondi, 89, Italian designer, founder of Artemide.
- Q. R. Hand Jr., 83, American poet, cancer.
- Robert Hossein, 93, French film director (Les Misérables, Cemetery Without Crosses), actor (Angélique, Marquise des Anges) and writer, COVID-19.
- Walter Johnson, 83, American electrical engineer.
- Dušan Jovanović, 81, Serbian-born Slovene theatre director, playwright, and essayist.
- Richard M. Kenan, 80, American politician.
- Michael Kindo, 73, Indian field hockey player, Olympic bronze medallist (1972).
- Gary Howard Klar, 73, American actor (Day of the Dead, Married to the Mob, Cadillac Man).
- Emília Kováčová, 89, Slovak economist and academic, first lady (1993–1998).
- Narendra Kumar, 87, Indian military officer and mountaineer.
- Maureen Lee, 88, British author.
- Olli Lehto, 95, Finnish mathematician.
- Marian Leszczyński, 84, Polish Olympic rower (1964).
- Inke Maris, 72, Indonesian journalist.
- Muladi, 77, Indonesian jurist and politician, justice of the Supreme Court (2000–2001), minister of justice (1998–1999), MP (1997–1998), COVID-19.
- Joe Neal, 85, American politician, member of the Nevada Senate (1972–2004).
- Robert Olby, British academic researcher.
- Robert Edmund O'Malley, 81, American mathematician.
- Olivier Royant, 58, French journalist, director of Paris Match (since 2006).
- Johnny Sands, 87, Canadian Olympic speed skater (1956, 1960).
- Joan Micklin Silver, 85, American film director (Hester Street, Crossing Delancey, Between the Lines), vascular dementia.
- Dick Thornburgh, 88, American lawyer and politician, U.S. Attorney General (1988–1991) and governor of Pennsylvania (1979–1987).
- Beat Wirz, 67, Swiss Olympic rower.
- Narsing Yadav, 57, Indian actor (Kshana Kshanam, Gaayam, Shankar Dada M.B.B.S.), kidney disease.
