= Vincenzo Rosito =

Italian footballer (1939–2020)

Vincenzo Rosito (18 April 1939 – 29 December 2020) was an Italian football midfielder.
