= Eugenia Tsoumani-Spentza =

Greek politician (died 2020)

Eugenia Tsoumani-Spentza (Greek: Ευγενία Τσουμάνη-Σπέντζα, died 6 December 2020) was a Greek politician who served as an MP for New Democracy from 2009 to 2012.
