= George Blasse =

Dutch chemist (1934–2020)

George Blasse (28 August 1934 – 30 December 2020) was a Dutch chemist. He was a professor of solid-state chemistry at Utrecht University for most of his career.

Blasse was born on 28 August 1934 in Amsterdam. He studied chemistry at the University of Amsterdam. In 1964 he obtained his PhD under E.W. Gorter at Leiden University with a dissertation titled: Chrystal chemistry and some magnetic properties of mixed metal oxides with spinel structure. From 1960 to 1970 Blasse was employed by the Philips Natuurkundig Laboratorium. In 1970 he was appointed as professor of solid-state chemistry at Utrecht University. He retired in 1996.

During his career he performed research into luminescent materials. He discovered the phosphor that made white light LEDs possible.

Blasse was elected a member of the Royal Netherlands Academy of Arts and Sciences in 1982. In 1992 he was awarded the academy's Gilles Holst Medal. Blasse was elected a member of the Academia Europaea in 1993. In 1996 he was made a Knight in the Order of the Netherlands Lion.

After his retirement he moved to Munich, Germany. He died there on 30 December 2020, aged 86. After his death the ECS Journal of Solid State Science and Technology had a focus issue in his honor.
