= Zbigniew Pocialik =

Polish footballer (1945–2020)

Personal information
- Date of birth: 1 June 1945
- Place of birth: Warsaw, Poland
- Date of death: 27 December 2020 (aged 75)
- Place of death: Warsaw, Poland
- Height: 1.85 m (6 ft 1 in)
- Position: Goalkeeper

Senior career*
Years	Team	Apps	(Gls)
1961–1962	KS Warszawianka		
1963–1974	Gwardia Warsaw		
1974–1975	Beveren	7	(0)
1975–1976	Polonia Bydgoszcz		
1976–1979	Gwardia Warsaw		

Managerial career
- 1991–1992: Gwardia Warsaw
- Olimpia Warsaw
- 2002–2003: Polonia Warsaw II
- 2009: Świt Nowy Dwór Mazowiecki
- * Club domestic league appearances and goals

Zbigniew Pocialik (1 June 1945 – 27 December 2020) was a Polish professional footballer who played as a goalkeeper for KS Warszawianka, Gwardia Warsaw, Beveren and Polonia Bydgoszcz.
