= Sven Sachsalber =

Italian artist (1987–2020)

Sven Sachsalber (8 May 1987 – December 2020) was an Italian artist.

== Biography ==
Sachsalber was born in Südtirol (Italy) and raised in Laatsch, Malles in Vinschgau. In his youth, he was a professional alpine skier. After an accident he studied Business for a few years in Italy before changing his career to making art.

He studied art at the sculpture department of the Royal College of Art in London from 2010 to 2013.

His work was influenced by romantic conceptual artists such as Bas Jan Ader and his teacher at the Royal College of Art, Richard Wentworth.

While studying and living in London, Sachsalber mostly made photos, video works, drawings and performances. His practice later expanded to paintings, wall objects and even furniture. The North of Italy, where he grew up, always continued to play a big part in his work, especially his performances.

Sachsalber was known for his intense performative works, that often balanced on physical exhaustion, such as eating a poisonous mushroom, spending 24 hours with a cow in a room or cutting down a large tree by hand.

Sachsalber was usually the protagonist in his work, in which the performative and the sculptural played a key element. Often funny, often serious and sometimes both, his work contained a universal poetic element. His most famous work is a performance that took place on 13 and 14 November 2014 at Palais de Tokyo in Paris. During the 48 hours scheduled for the performance, Sachsalber was looking for a needle hidden in an actual haystack. The needle was hidden by Palais de Tokyo director Jean de Loisy. After 18 hours, the needle was found by Sachsalber. The performance caused a huge amount of press coverage and online outrage by those not considering the work art.

He died in Vienna in December 2020, aged 33.
