= Boris Bushmelev =

Russian film director (1937–2020)

Boris Bushmelev (22 May 1937, Moscow – 21 December 2020) was a Soviet and Russian film director, comedian, and artist.

He was best known for his satirical comedies, including The Evening Labyrinth (1981), 100 Grams for Courage ( 1976), and Our American Borya (1992).
