= Irani Barbosa =

Brazilian politician (1950–2020)

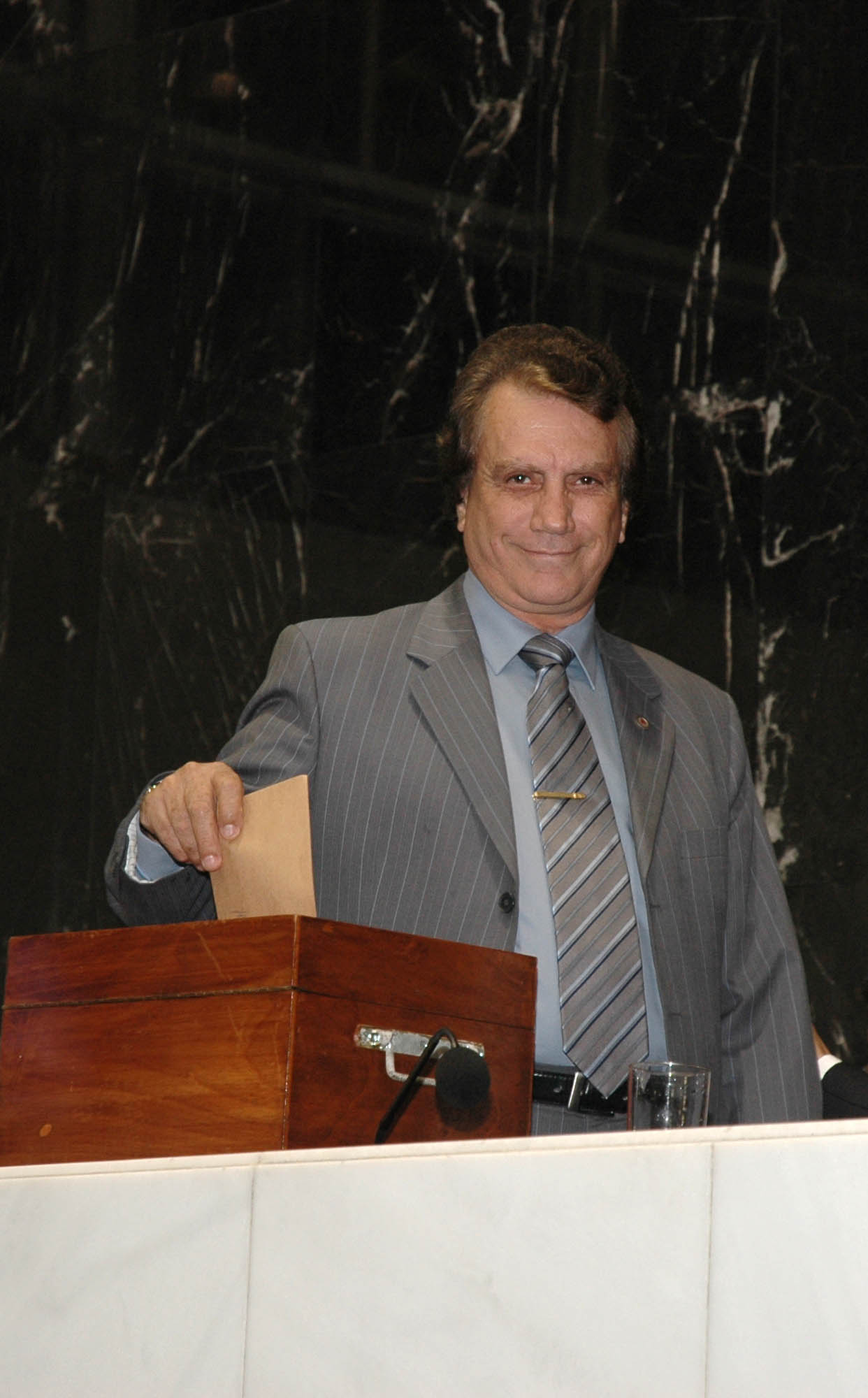
Barbosa

Irani Barbosa (Belo Horizonte, 22 September 1950 – Belo Horizonte, 23 December 2020) was a Brazilian politician who served as a Deputy from 1991-1995.

He died, aged 70, from COVID-19 during the COVID-19 pandemic in Brazil.
