= Pierre Chappuis =

Swiss writer (1930–2020)

- Born: 6 January 1930; Tavannes, Switzerland
- Died: 22 December 2020 (aged 90); Neuchâtel, Switzerland
- Occupation: Writer

Pierre Chappuis (6 January 1930 – 22 December 2020) was a Swiss writer, poet, and literary critic.

== Biography ==
Chappuis was born on 6 January 1930 in Tavannes, where his father was a clockmaker. After studying in La-Chaux-de-Fonds and the University of Geneva, he began teaching French and history in Neuchâtel. He then lived there for the rest of his life.

For a long time, Chappuis wrote poetry in the shadows. He combined his texts with engravings or photographs from third-party illustrators. He also worked as a literary critic for various newspapers, including the Gazette de Lausanne, the Nouvelle Revue Française, and La Quinzaine littéraire. Throughout his career, he closely kept his links with Romandy despite the large amount of works published in Paris.

Pierre Chappuis died in Neuchâtel on 22 December 2020 at the age of 90.

== Works ==
- Ma femme ô mon tombeau (1969)
- Michel Leiris (1973)
- Distance aveugle (1974)
- L’Invisible parole (1977)
- André du Bouchet (1979)
- Rumeur évanouie (1980)
- Hier devant moi (1980)
- Douze exercices de rythme (1980)
- Décalages (1982)
- Excavations (1983)
- Éboulis et autres poèmes (1984)
- Un cahier de nuages (1989)
- Soustrait au temps (1990)
- Moins que glaise (1990)
- Soustrait au temps : fantaisies en guise de "Maerchenbilder" (1990)
- La Preuve par le vide (1992)
- D'un pas suspendu (1994)
- Des parenthèses de soleil & de vent (1995)
- Dans la foulée (1996)
- Pleines marges (1997)
- Le Biais des mots (1999)
- Distance aveugle (2000)
- À portée de la voix (2002)
- Le Noir de l'été (2002)
- Deux essais : Michel Leyris, André du Bouchet (2003)
- Tracés d’incertitude (2003)
- Mon murmure, mon souffle (2005)
- Dans la foulée (2007)
- La Rumeur de toutes choses (2007)
- Comme un léger sommeil (2009)
- De l'un à l'autre (2010)
- Muettes émergences (2011)
- Entailles (2014)
- Dans la lumière sourde de ce jardin (2016)
- Battre le briquet (2018)

== Distinctions ==
- Prize of the Société jurassienne d'émulation (1975)
- Prix Suisse-Canada (1983)
- Prize of the Institut neuchâtelois (1997)
- Schiller Prize (1997)
- Prize of the Canton of Bern (2002)
- Grand Prix C. F. Ramuz (2005)
