= Inke Maris =

Indonesian journalist, newscaster, and communication consultant (1948–2020)

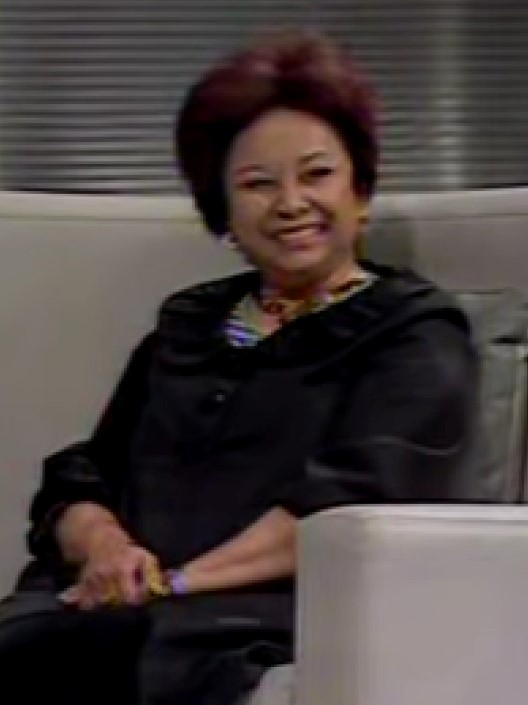
- Inke Maris on Just Alvin Metro TV
- Born: 7 December 1948; Bogor, Indonesia
- Died: 31 December 2020 (aged 72); Jakarta, Indonesia
- Other names: Nyi Rd Maria Dinariati Natanegara
- Occupation(s): journalist, newscaster, communication consultant
- Known for: first Indonesian who interviewed Margaret Thatcher

Inke Maris (7 December 1948 – 31 December 2020) was an Indonesian journalist, newscaster, and communication consultant. She was well known as a first Indonesian who can interviewed Prime Minister of the United Kingdom Margaret Thatcher.

She worked on BBC World Service Indonesian Section (1969–1982) and on TVRI (1982–2001).

She earned master's degree in the field of mass communications from University of Leicester.

She died on 31 December 2020.
