= Amedeo Baldizzone =

Italian footballer and manager (1960–2020)

Personal information
- Date of birth: 2 May 1960 (age 66)
- Place of birth: Genoa, Italy
- Date of death: 13 December 2020 (aged 60)
- Position: Defender

Senior career*
| Years | Team | Apps | (Gls) |
| 1977–1979 | Atalanta | 2 | (0) |
| 1979–1980 | → Forlì (loan) | | |
| 1980–1981 | Atalanta | | |
| 1981–1983 | Cagliari | 9 | (0) |
| 1983–1984 | Piacenza | 0 | (0) |

Managerial career
- Zingonia
- Orio
- Orio
- Casazza (youth)
- AlbinoLeffe (beginners)
- * Club domestic league appearances and goals

Amedeo Baldizzone (2 May 1960 – 13 December 2020) was an Italian footballer and manager.

== Club career ==
A defender, Baldizzone first played for Atalanta in 1979 against Inter. He made two appearances in Serie A before being loaned to Forlì for a season. In 1981 he signed for Cagliari. Baldizzone suffered a knee injury against Como and underwent three operations but had to retire due to the injury.

== Managerial career ==
Baldizzone managed Zingonia where he won the Terza Categoria and repeated the feat with Orio. He then managed the youth at Casazza before moving to the AlbinoLeffe Esordienti B team and retired in 2009.

== Personal life ==
Baldizzone was married and had three children. In 2009 he emigrated to Spain where he owned a pizzeria restaurant.

== Honours ==
=== Manager ===
Zingonia

Terza Categoria: 1994–95

Orio

Terza Categoria: 1996–97
