= Carlos Levy =

Argentine writer, storyteller, poet, narrator, and editor (1942–2020)

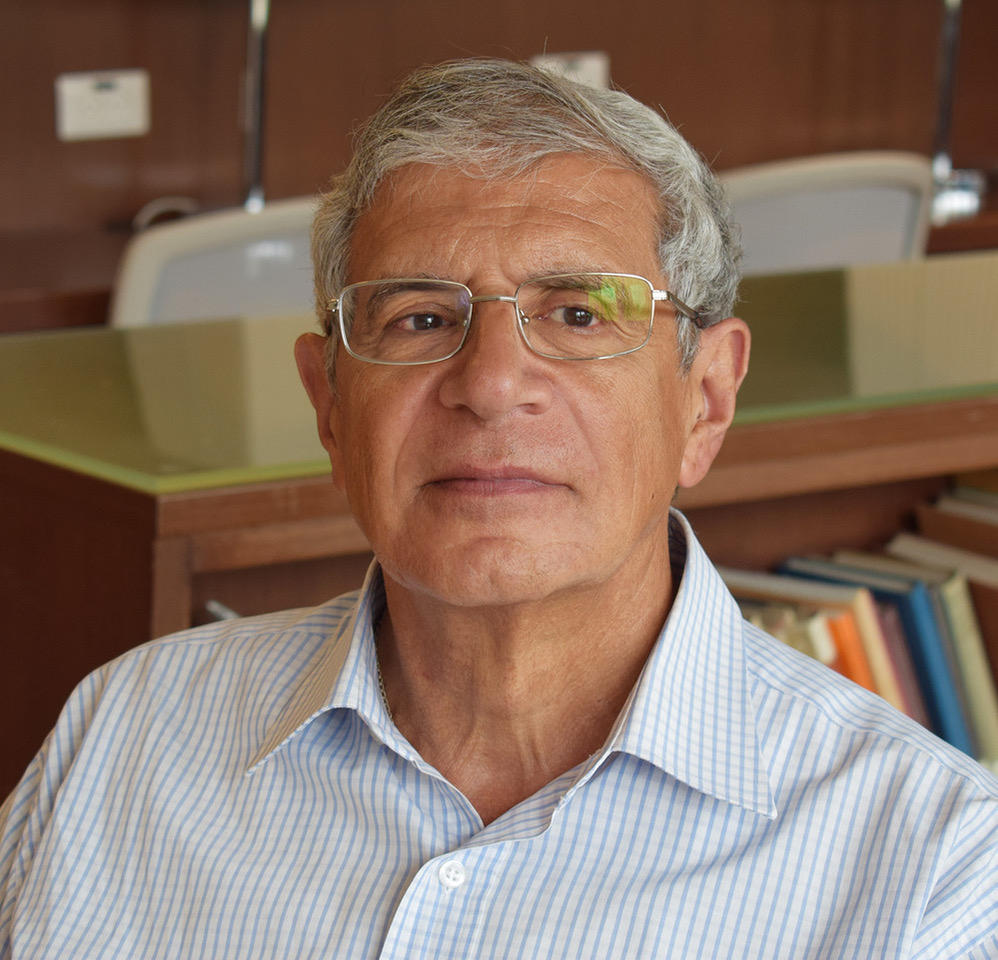
Levy

Carlos Jacobo Levy (7 July 1942 – 25 December 2020) was an Argentine writer, storyteller, poet, narrator and editor.

== Biography ==
Levy was born in Tunuyán, Mendoza Province in 1942. He later moved to Mendoza and met with many local arts influencers such as Ricardo Embrioni and poets Fernando Lorenzo and Víctor Hugo Cúneo, with heavy influence in literature.

He published his first book of poems in 1967 and due to political upheavals in Argentina did not publish again until 1984. He later served as director of Public Library General San Martín and of the National Radio of Mendoza. He also served as aide of the Ministry of Culture of Mendoza.

In 2005, he published a translation of a poem by José Hernández to Judaeo-Spanish.

== Awards ==
In 2015, he was distinguished as a Cultural Ambassador of Mendoza by the provincial government.

== Death ==
Levy died from COVID-19 in Mendoza on 25 December 2020, at the age of 78, during the COVID-19 pandemic in Argentina.
