= Olivier Royant =

French journalist (1962–2020)

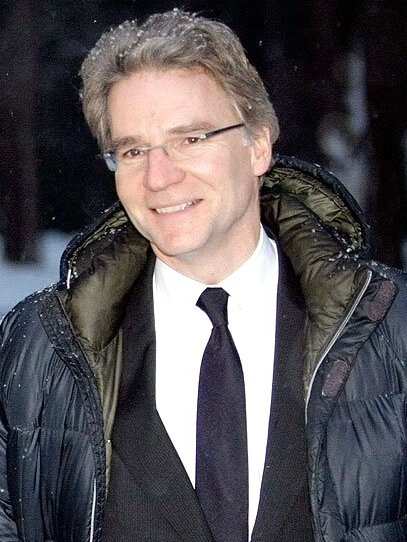
- Royant in 2010
- Born: 16 July 1962; Paris, France
- Died: 30 December 2020 (aged 58); Levallois-Perret (France)
- Occupation: Journalist

Olivier Royant (16 July 1962 – 31 December 2020) was a French journalist. He directed the weekly magazine Paris Match.

== Biography ==
Royant studied at Sciences Po and Columbia University, where he earned an MBA. He began his journalistic career at Radio Gilda. He began working for Paris Match in 1985, where he became a reporter and correspondent on the United States. He became Deputy Editor-in-Chief in 1996 and managing director on 24 July 2006, following the eviction of Alain Genestar.

His wife, Delphine Royant, is an editor for Vogue Paris.

Olivier Royant died following a long illness on 31 December 2020 at the age of 58.

Olivier Royant with Dmitry Medvedev

== Publications ==
- Le XXe siècle de Paris Match (2002)
- Images de cataclysmes (2002)
- Dans les coulisses de Cannes (2010)
- John, le dernier des Kennedy (2018)

== Honors and Awards ==
Knight of the Order of Legion of Honour
