= Ne daj se, Floki =

Ne daj se, Floki is a Croatian film. It was released in 1986.
