= Serafim Papakostas =

Greek bishop (1959–2020)

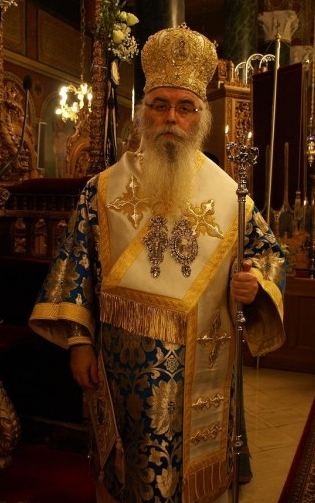
Serafim Papakostas

Serafim Papakostas (21 January 1959 – 29 December 2020) was a Greek Orthodox bishop in the Metropolis of Kastoria (since 1996).

He died from COVID-19 on 29 December 2020, during the COVID-19 pandemic in Greece, aged 61.
