= Fati Habib-Jawula =

Ghanaian diplomat (died 2020)

Hajia Fati Habib Jawula (died 15 December 2020) was Ghana's ambassador in Denmark. The embassy in Copenhagen seems to be a favourite spot for Ghana's female ambassadors. Hajia Fati Habib Jawula was the fourth female ambassador in the past 20 years. She was appointed among five Heads of Ghana's Diplomatic Missions when the late former president John Evans Atta-Mills signed letters of Commission and Credence.

== Personal life ==
She was married to Alhaji Habib Jawula who was a founding member of the Progress Party and also sister-in-law of Lepowura M.N.D. Jawula. She was the niece of Abu Sakara. She was a Muslim.
