= Csaba Ali =

Hungarian swimmer (1946–2020)

Personal information
- Born: 4 November 1946 Eger, Hungary
- Died: 27 December 2020 (aged 74) Budapest, Hungary

Sport
- Sport: Swimming

Csaba Ali (4 November 1946 – 27 December 2020) was a Hungarian swimmer. He competed in two events at the 1964 Summer Olympics.
