= Walter Johnson (electrical engineer) =

American electrical engineer

- Born: Walter Albert Johnson; September 18, 1937; Chester, Pennsylvania, U.S.
- Died: December 31, 2020 (aged 83); Bowling Green, Ohio, U.S.
- Education: Duke University
- Occupation: Electrical engineer
- Spouse: Mary Elizabeth English (m. 1959)

Walter Albert Johnson (September 18, 1937 – December 31, 2020), nicknamed "Wally", was an American electrical engineer.

== Early life and career ==
Johnson was born in Chester, Pennsylvania, the son of Horace Johnson and Gladys Jeglum. He attended and graduated from Bethesda-Chevy Chase High School. After graduating, he attended Duke University, earning his BSEE degree in 1960, which after earning his degree, he served in the United States Navy Reserve from 1961 to 1969.

Johnson worked at Pepco, a utility company that supplies electric power to Washington, D.C. During his time at Pepco, he held the titles of control center manager and vice president of special projects. In 1997, he was named a fellow of the Institute of Electrical and Electronics Engineers, "for leadership in advancing the applications of new technologies to power system operation".

== Personal life and death ==
In 1959, Johnson married Mary Elizabeth English. Their marriage lasted until Johnson's death in 2020.

Johnson died at his home in Bowling Green, Ohio, on December 31, 2020, at the age of 83.
