= Les Dicker =

English footballer (1926–2020)

Personal information
- Full name: Leslie Raymond Dicker
- Date of birth: 20 December 1926
- Place of birth: Stockwell, London, England
- Date of death: 17 December 2020 (aged 93)
- Position: Inside forward

Senior career*
Years	Team	Apps	(Gls)
1948–1951	Chelmsford City	56	(27)
1951–1953	Tottenham Hotspur	10	(2)
1953–1954	Southend United	17	(7)
1954–1960	Chelmsford City		
- * Club domestic league appearances and goals

Leslie Raymond Dicker (20 December 1926 – 17 December 2020) was an English professional footballer who played for Hornchurch Athletic, Chelmsford City, Tottenham Hotspur and Southend United.

== Playing career ==
Dicker began his career at Hornchurch Athletic before joining Chelmsford City in 1948. The inside forward scored 27 goals in 56 matches for the Essex club. His goal scoring exploits attracted the attention of Tottenham Hotspur who paid £2,000 for his services in June 1951. Dicker made 10 senior appearances and found the net twice between August 1951 and December 1952. In addition he scored 15 goals in 42 reserve and A-team matches. He transferred to Southend United in July 1953 where he went on play in 19 matches and netting eight times. Dicker ended his career with a second spell at Chelmsford City with his final game against Poole Town in May 1960.

Dicker died in December 2020 at the age of 93.
