= Ferruccio Pisoni =

Italian politician (1936–2020)

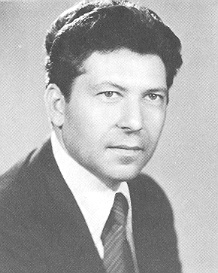
Ferruccio Pisoni

Ferruccio Pisoni (6 August 1936 – 12 December 2020) was an Italian politician

Pisoni served as a Deputy from 1968 to 1983.

He died from COVID-19 in 2020.
