= Franco Bolignari =

Italian singer (1928–2020)

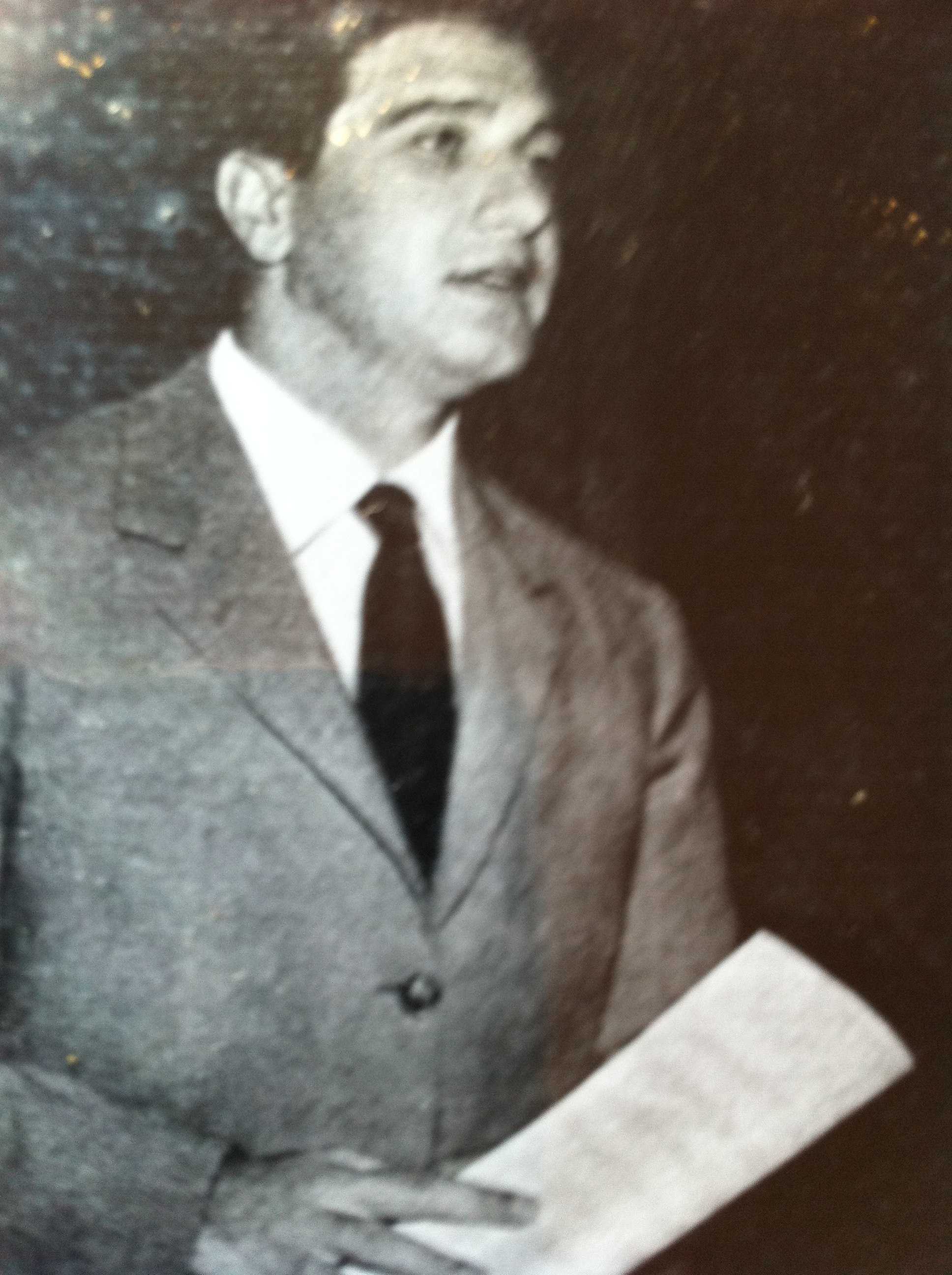
Franco Bolignari

Franco Bolignari (26 October 1928 – 4 December 2020) was an Italian singer.

== Biography ==
In 1954 he won the Messina Festival, with the song Lu sceccu lagnosu, also recorded by Domenico Modugno. In 1955 he was a finalist at the Florence Festival and at the Vibo Valentia Festival. In 1959 he was a finalist at the Velletri Festival.

In 1961 he was chosen by Disney to dub the song Cruella De Mon in the animated film One Hundred and One Dalmatians. Later Disney confirmed him to dub the soundtrack of "Summer Magic" and will also sing in the non-Disney style The Sound of Music. In this last film, winner of 5 Oscars in 1966, he plays the song "Fifteen years, almost sixteen".

He also performed the motifs of various Italian films such as L'ultimo amante. He performed for two years in Rome with Carlo Capobianchi's Bixilander Swing Orchestra.

He died on 4 December 2020, at the age of 91.
