= Johnny Jacobsen =

Danish footballer (1955–2020)

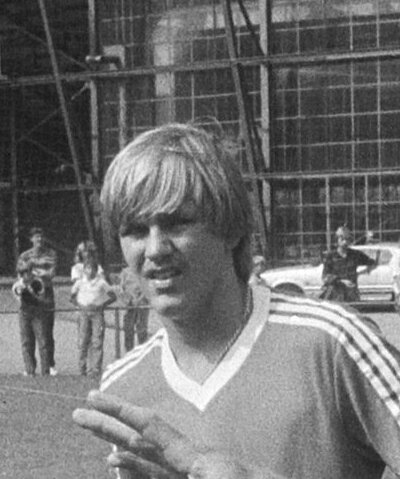
- Jacobsen (1982)

Personal information
- Date of birth: 19 November 1955
- Place of birth: Copenhagen, Denmark
- Date of death: 8 December 2020 (aged 65)
- Position: Midfielder

Senior career*
Years	Team	Apps	(Gls)
1975	B.93		
1976–1977	Fremad Amager		
1978	Brøndby IF		
1979–1980	Fremad Amager		
1980–1982	Feyenoord		
1982–1983	Willem II		

International career
1980	Denmark	1	(0)
- * Club domestic league appearances and goals

Johnny Jacobsen (19 November 1955 – 8 December 2020) was a Danish footballer who played as a midfielder. He played in one match for the Denmark national team in 1980.
