= Robina Sentongo =

Ugandan politician (died 2020)

- Born: Uganda
- Died: 18-12-2028
- Citizenship: Uganda
- Occupation: Politician
- Political party: Democratic Party

Robina Sentongo also known as Robina Nakasirye Sentongo (died 18 December 2020) was a Ugandan politician. Sentongo was a member of a political party called Democratic Party (DP) an opposition party in Uganda. She was a Member of Parliament for the newly Kyotera District in the 10th parliament (2016-2021). She was elected in a by-election in September 2017 after the district was created, defeating the NRM candidate. she was the only opposition member in Kyotera District.

== Biography ==
She was a Member of the Parliament of Uganda from 2016 until her death in December 2020. Sentongo died from COVID-19 at age 58.

== Career ==
Sentongo was a member of a political party called Democratic Party an opposition party in Uganda. She was elected in a by-election in September 2017 after the district was created, defeating the NRM candidate. The Democratic Party candidate Robina Sentongo was the Woman Member of Parliament of the newly created Kyotera District after defeating the National Resistance Movement (NRM) candidate Rachael Nakitenda by over 600 votes. Ms. Sentongo was declared MP by Kyotera District returning officer Leticia Nantabo with 21, 731 votes to beat Nakitenda who got 15,511 votes. Other candidates including the Forum for Democratic Change (FDC) Phirista Nassali Nakato got 2,224 votes while Independents Cissy Nantongo and Joweria Nabbale got 3,272 votes and 266 votes respectively. Robina was among the members who defected from DP to NUP in August 2020.

== Death ==
Sentongo died of COVID-19. She became the third MP to succumb to COVID-19 in a space of three months after the death of Rehema Watongola (Kamuli Municipality) and Faith Alupo (Pallisa Woman MP). Her death was announced by the former Speaker of Parliament Rebecca Kadaga.

== After death ==
After her death, her daughter Fortunate Rose Nantongo was nominated by the Democratic Party (DP) to replace her as the candidate for the position in the subsequent by-election. Nantongo, an advocate of the High Court was nominated on Wednesday by Koreb Nahamya, the Kyotera district electoral commission registrar on the Democratic Party ticket at the district headquarters in Kasaali town council.

== Personal life ==
Robina was married to Joseph Ssentongo who as well succumbed to COVID-19 a week after the wife's death.

== See also ==
- Parliament of Uganda
- COVID-19 cases
- Kyotera District
