= Valentin Kasabov =

Bulgarian politician (1958–2020)

- Валентин Касабов

Personal details
- Born: February 6, 1958; Burgas, People's Republic of Bulgaria
- Died: December 17, 2020 (aged 62); Sofia, Bulgaria
- Political party: Patriotic Front (2014–2017)
- Education: Veliko Tarnovo University
- Occupation: Politician, journalist

Valentin Kasabov (6 February 1958 – 17 December 2020) was a Bulgarian politician.

From 2014 to till his death, he served as a member of the National Assembly of Bulgaria representing the Patriotic Front.

Kasabov died from COVID-19 in Sofia on 17 December 2020, aged 62.
