= Jairo Castillo (baseball) =

Dominican baseball player (1989–2020)

- Third baseman
- Born: January 9, 1989; San Cristobal, Dominican Republic
- Died: December 6, 2020 (aged 31); Dominican Republic
- Batted: Right Threw: Right

Jairo Castillo (January 9, 1989 – December 6, 2020) was a Dominican professional baseball player and scout.

== Playing career ==
Castillo signed as an international free agent with the New York Mets in 2005, at the age of 16. He made his professional debut with the Mets Dominican Summer League affiliate in 2007 and played two seasons there. He played in the Venezuelan Summer League in 2009. Castillo batted .194 with 13 home runs and 74 runs batted in during 179 career games. He was released by the Mets in 2011.

== Scouting career ==
Following his playing career, Castillo joined the Toronto Blue Jays organization as a video assistant. He later became a scout for the Blue Jays, covering the Dominican Republic and Mexico. Among the players he signed was catcher Alejandro Kirk, who made his Major League Baseball debut with the Blue Jays in 2020.

After three years with the Blue Jays, Castillo joined the Milwaukee Brewers as a scout covering Panama, Colombia, and Mexico. In 2018, he was hired by the Los Angeles Dodgers as an international cross-checker.

== Death ==
In November 2020, Castillo attended a showcase in Tijuana, Mexico, before returning home to the Dominican Republic with a headache. He quickly developed a fever and tested positive for COVID-19 after being admitted to the hospital during the COVID-19 pandemic in the Dominican Republic. He died on December 6, at the age of 31.

Castillo was married with two sons.
