= Gramma and Ginga =

American internet celebrities

- Born: Genevieve Buttafusco; March 21, 1914; Arlene Buttafusco; February 4, 1919; Clarksburg, West Virginia, U.S.
- Died: Genevieve Musci; December 25, 2020 (aged 106); McLean, Virginia, U.S. Arlene Buttafusco; September 28, 2022 (aged 103); Clarksburg, West Virginia, U.S.

YouTube information
- Genre: Entertainment
- Subscribers: 421,000
- Views: 78 million+

Gramma and Ginga were two sisters, Genevieve "Gramma" Musci (March 21, 1914 – December 25, 2020) and Arlene "Ginga" Bashnett (February 4, 1919 – September 28, 2022), who became Internet celebrities in the 2010s when videos taken of the duo by their family members went viral on YouTube and Facebook. The sisters' everyday interactions, replete with curse words, gained them over 1 million followers on social media.

== History ==
=== Biographies ===
The sisters were lifelong residents of Clarksburg, West Virginia, two of four children born to Italian immigrants Salvatore and Maria Audia Buttafusco.

At age 15, Gramma married schoolmate Frank Musci (1913–1988), taking a cab ride during school hours from Clarksburg to Oakland, Maryland to be married before a Justice of the Peace. Frank later became a merchant and proprietor of the Hi-De-Ho Pool Room. Gramma never worked outside the home or learned to drive a car, staying at home to raise two daughters, Marie Fumich (1930–2014) and Sheila Harris (1938–1997). At the time of her death, Gramma had five grandchildren, 16 great-grandchildren and 8 great-great-grandchildren.

Ginga was married four times, her only child, a son was from her first marriage to Samuel Cody. She worked for brother-in-law Frank at the Hi-de-Ho Pool Room. In retirement, she devoted herself two days a week to volunteering at United Hospital Center in Clarksburg, WV and later Bridgeport, WV delivering cards to patients and lightening their stay with conversation. After Frank's death, she also took on the responsibility of transporting Gramma to errands and appointments.

=== Internet fame ===
After the death of Gramma's daughter Marie in late 2014, Marie's children, Frank Fumich and Sheila Liljenquist, began sending each other videos of Gramma and Ginga's frequent salty exchanges with one another in an effort to lighten their grief. The videos, which were never staged or scripted and simply taken from the sisters' daily routine, featured profanity and insults hurled between Gramma and Ginga; Gramma's serious and efficient manner often clashed humorously with Ginga's cheerful, more lackadaisical nature.

When Frank shared the videos on his personal Facebook page, he began to see interest in them from members of the public who had seen the clips when shared by Frank's friends. Frank and Sheila then created a dedicated Facebook page for clips of the sisters, which quickly snowballed into a viral sensation.

The millions of social media views and the resulting fame landed the sisters virtual guest spots on Jimmy Kimmel Live! and an in-person appearance on Little Big Shots: Forever Young with Steve Harvey. They also became notable figures in Clarksburg, serving as marshals for the town's annual Italian Heritage Festival and the Christmas Parade.

=== Decline ===
In late 2018, Ginga suffered a stroke and a subsequent sharp decline in health, becoming homebound by early 2019 and ceasing to make public appearances after a visit from Clarksburg's mayor on her 100th birthday. At the same time, Gramma began to need additional care and moved to McLean, Virginia where Sheila and Frank could take a daily interest in her welfare. Videos of the two together were no longer possible, and their social media focused on past clips, retrospective photos from the sisters' lives, and the occasional video of Sheila asking Gramma questions about her life.

=== Death ===
On Christmas Day 2020, Gramma died of natural causes at the age of 106. The family thanked the public for their surpassing interest in the sisters' lives and vowed to continue posting clips and memories from their archive.

Ginga died in her sleep on September 28, 2022, at the age of 103.
