= Ann Zahn =

American printmaker and book artist

- Born: June 7, 1931; Washington, D.C.
- Died: December 30, 2020 (aged 89); Bethesda, Maryland
- Known for: book artist, printmaker

Ann Zahn (1931–2020) was an American printmaker and book artist. She is known for her prints as well as her involvement in the printmaking movement in the Washington, D.C. area.

== Biography ==
Zahn was born on June 7, 1931 in Washington, D.C.. She studied at Duke University and the American University. Zahn taught at the Glen Echo Art Center the early 1970s. She joined the Washington Women's Art Center (WWAC) in the mid-1970s. Zahn was a founding member of the Washington Printmakers Gallery. She was also founding member of the Washington Area Printmakers, often contributing to their annual limited edition calendars. In 2020 the Washington Printmakers Gallery held an exhibition entitled "Light, Flight and Paper Pulp Spanning Three Generations: Ann Zahn, Julie Zahn, and Sophie Schrader." She died on December 30, 2020, in Bethesda, Maryland.

Zahn's work is in the National Museum of Women in the Arts,
