= Robert Blomfield =

British photographer (1938–2020)

Robert Bomfield selfie taken in London in 1969

Robert Blomfield (16 March 1938 – 14 December 2020) was a British street photographer. In 2018 he had an exhibition of work made in Edinburgh at the City Art Centre there, and in 2020 a book of his Edinburgh work was published. Blomfield worked as a family doctor.

== Early life and education ==
Blomfield was born in Leeds to freelance journalist Mary (née Gough) and George Blomfield, a surgeon and engineer, and an amateur photographer. He was the eldest of five children and grew up in Sheffield. He received his first camera on his 15th birthday.

In 1956, aged 18, he moved to Scotland to study medicine at the University of Edinburgh. He graduated in 1964 and stayed in Edinburgh to work as a junior doctor with the city's royal infirmary until 1967. He was a junior doctor in London.

== Life and work ==
Blomfield practised as a family doctor in Wrexham then Hebden Bridge. He made street photography all over the UK from the late 1950s in Edinburgh, through to the early 1970s.

Blomfield’s work has been compared to Henri Cartier-Bresson and Oscar Marzaroli. His Edinburgh photography is notable for capturing the changing look of the city as new architecture took hold in the 1950s and 1960s, as well as documenting some of the large public gatherings of the time. When his work was displayed at the City Art Centre in 2018 he said, “After 50 years, I’m thrilled to be able to share some of my pictures with the wider world. Edinburgh is a city that remains close to my heart, and the interaction of its residents with this most dramatic of urban stages provided me with endless inspiration as a young photographer.” In 1970, he photographed the first ever Glastonbury Festival (then known as Pilton Pop Folk and Blues festival).

His archive is held by the University of Edinburgh who have pledged to share it with the “widest possible audience”. In May 2020, the University of Edinburgh held an exhibition titled "Robert Blomfield: Student of Light." The exhibition focused on Blomfield’s time as a student and included images of a smoke-filled student union as sunlight streams in through windows, an anatomy lecture, a rowing contest, and crowds waiting to see Prince Philip in 1958, among others. It also featured some of his camera equipment, including lenses, enlargers, filters and an astronomical telescope used to achieve a large depth of field.

== Personal life ==
In 1965 he met Jane Alexander, an art historian working at the Courtauld Institute. They married in 1975 and had three sons, William, George and Edward. In 1985, they moved to Hebden Bridge., Jane was co-founder of the Steiner School there. Jane died in 2011. Blomfield died in December 2020, aged 82.

== Publications ==
- Edinburgh 1957 – 1966. Liverpool: Bluecoat, 2020. ISBN 9781908457608.

== Exhibitions ==
- Robert Blomfield: Edinburgh Street Photography, City Art Centre, Edinburgh, 2018
