= Ray Colfar =

English footballer (1935–2020)

Personal information
- Full name: Raymond Joseph Colfar
- Date of birth: 4 December 1935
- Place of birth: Liverpool, England
- Date of death: 16 December 2020 (aged 85)
- Place of death: England
- Position: Left winger

Youth career
- 1955–: Epsom & Ewell

Senior career*
Years	Team	Apps	(Gls)
–1958	Sutton United		
1958–1961	Crystal Palace	41	(6)
1961–1962	Cambridge United	?	(9)
1962–1964	Headington United	18	(4)
1965–1966	Guildford City	?	(?)
1968–1970	Wimbledon	39	(4)
- * Club domestic league appearances and goals

Raymond Joseph Colfar (4 December 1935 – 16 December 2020) was an English professional footballer who played in the Football League, as a left winger.

== Career ==
Colfar was born in Liverpool, Lancashire but began his career at Epsom & Ewell in 1955–56 before signing for Sutton United and in November 1958, signed for Crystal Palace then playing in the Fourth Division. Over the next three seasons he made 41 league appearances, scoring six times. He made only five appearances in the 1960–61 season when Palace were promoted and at the end of the season, moved on to Cambridge United.

Colfar died on 16 December 2020.
