= Jean-Marc Forneri =

French businessman (1959–2020)

- Born: 23 July 1959; Marseille, France
- Died: 28 December 2020 (aged 61)
- Occupation: Businessman

Jean-Marc Forneri (French pronunciation: [ʒɑ̃ maʁk fɔʁnɛʁi]]; 23 July 1959 – 28 December 2020) was a French businessman.

== Biography ==
Forneri earned a master's degree in law from Aix-Marseille University. He also earned degrees from Sciences Po and the École nationale d'administration. He began his career in 1984 as an inspector general of finances before he became an advisor to Édouard Balladur, who was then the Minister of Finances.

In 1988, Forneri joined Skis Rossignol as administrator and CEO before becoming a managing partner of Banque Worms in change of investment banking. In 1996, he was appointed President of Credit Suisse. He advised major national and international merger and acquisition transactions for clients such as AGF, Total SE, Pechiney, Wendel, Kohlberg Kravis Roberts, Société Générale, BNP Paribas, Dexia, Gecina, Schneider Electric, Technip, Altadis, Électricité de France, Galeries Lafayette, and Vivendi.

In 2014, he was elected chairman of the supervisory board of Marseille-Fos Port. In April 2019, he was re-elected to the position, where he was set to stay in office for at least another five years.

Jean-Marc Forneri died from a heart attack on 28 December 2020 at the age of 61.
