= Govind Prasad Lohani =

Nepalese diplomat (1927–2020)

Govind Prasad Lohani (1927 – 26 December 2020) was a Royal Nepalese Ambassador to Pakistan, Iran and Turkey. He was well regarded in Nepal as a senior economist and political advisor. He was a son of famous Nepali poet Deepkeshwar Sharma. He wrote more than 20 books relating to communism, civilization and economics. He served as a member of planning commission of Nepal during King Birendra's regime and was a founding member of Nepal Rastriya Bank, the central bank of Nepal.
