= Tadeusz Górczyk =

Polish politician (1961–2020)

- Born: 16 October 1961
- Died: 21 December 2020 (aged 59)
- Occupation: Polish Politician

Tadeusz Górczyk (16 October 1961 – 21 December 2020) was a Polish politician who served as a Deputy.
