= Jerzy Mikułowski Pomorski =

Polish sociologist (1937–2020)

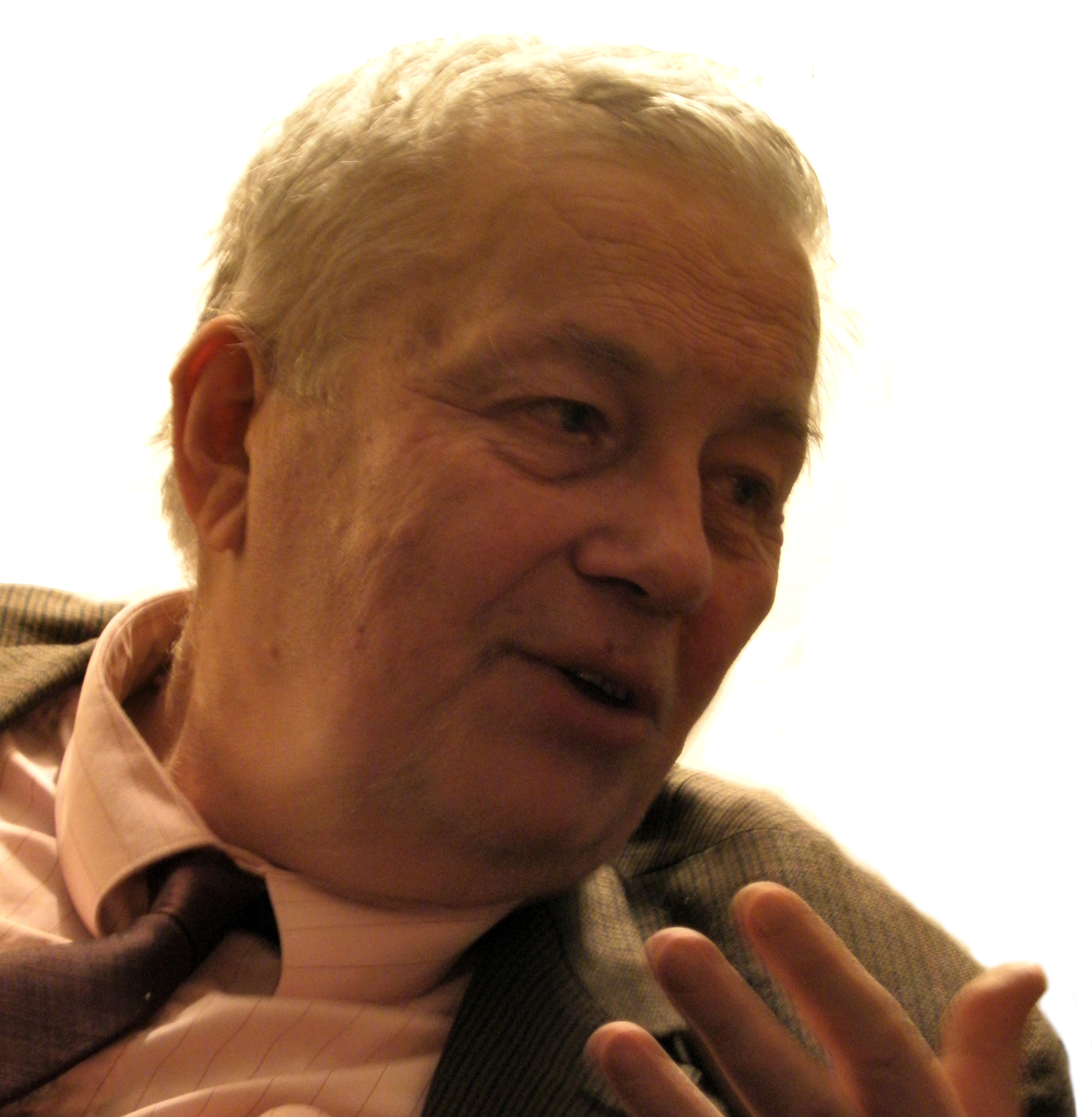
- Born: 3 January 1937; Katowice
- Died: 12 December 2020 (aged 83)
- Citizenship: Polish
- Occupation: sociologist

Jerzy Mikułowski Pomorski (3 January 1937 – 12 December 2020) was a Polish sociologist, professor, doctor honoris causa of Grand Valley State University (1993) and Teesside University (1995). He was a rector of Cracow University of Economics in years 1990–1996.

He graduated from law (1958) and sociology (1963) from Jagiellonian University. He received his Ph.D. in 1969 and in years 1973–1974 was studying at London School of Economics and Political Sciences.

== Awards (selection) ==
- Silver Cross of Merit (1979)
- Gold Cross of Merit (1984)
- Knight's Cross of Polonia Restituta (1991)
- Officer's Cross of Polonia Restituta (1999)
- Honoris Gratia from the mayor of the Royal Capital City of Kraków (2007)
