= Tomás Irribarra =

Chilean politician (1935–2020)

Tomás Edison Irribarra de la Torre
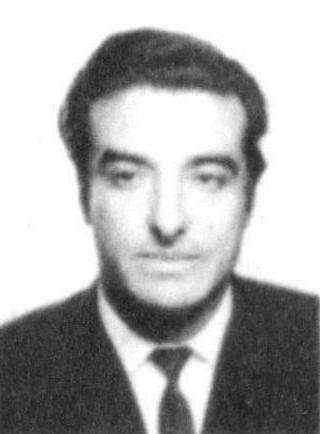
- Tomás Irribarra de la Torre
- Born: 19 May 1935; Quirihue, Chile
- Died: 25 December 2020 (aged 85); Quirihue, Chile
- Occupations: Politician, Lawyer
- Years active: 1960-2016
- Title: Mayor of Quirihue
- Political party: Radical Party of Chile

Tomás Edison Irribarra de la Torre (19 May 1935 – 25 December 2020) was a Chilean politician and lawyer, a member of the Radical Party and later the Partido Radical Socialdemócrata. Born in Quirihue, Chile, he was the son of Tomás Irribarra Poblete, who served as the governor of Itata from 1938 to 1942.

Irribarra's political career began in 1960 when he became a local council member of Quirihue until 1969. That year, he resigned to run for a seat in the Chamber of Deputies, where he represented the Decimoquinta Agrupación Departamental, which included the departments of San Carlos and Itata, from 1969 to 1973. During his tenure as a deputy, he was part of the Comisión Permanente de Economía, Fomento y Reconstrucción.

Irribarra was elected Mayor of Quirihue in 1992 and held the position until 1996, when he became a council member. He ran again for the mayoral position in 2004, but lost to Raúl Andrade Vera. However, in the 2008 elections, he defeated Andrade Vera and returned as the mayor. In 2012, he was elected as a council member again and held the post until 2016. From 2012 onward, his son Richard Irribarra Ramírez took on the role of Mayor of Quirihue.

Irribarra died in Quirihue on 25 December 2020 at the age of 85.
