= Elaine Stack =

American judge (died 2020)

Elaine Jackson Stack (died 19 December 2020) was an American Judge from New York. She was a justice of the New York Supreme Court from 2000 till 2008.

Stack died from COVID-19 in Manhasset, New York, on December 19, 2020, at the age of 89, during the COVID-19 pandemic in New York (state).
