= John R. Bentson =

American neuroradiologist (1937–2020)

John R. Bentson (May 15, 1937 – December 28, 2020) was an American neuroradiologist who invented the Better Brain-Imaging Tool.

Bentson was born on May 15, 1937, in Viroque, Wisconsin, and attended Viroqua High School. He completed his B.S. in 1957 and in 1961, completed his M.D. at the University of Wisconsin.

From 1967 to 1968, he was the NIH Special Fellow in Neuroradiology, UCLA School of Medicine, Los Angeles.

Bentson died of complications from COVID-19 at a Los Angeles hospital on December 28, 2020, aged 83.

== Academic roles ==
- 2002–2020 Professor emeritus, Department of Radiology, UCLA School of Medicine
- 1981–2002 Professor of radiology, UCLA School of Medicine, Los Angeles, California
- 1975–1981 Associate professor of radiology, UCLA School of Medicine, Los Angeles, California
- 1969–1975 Assistant professor of radiology, UCLA School of Medicine, Los Angeles, California
- 1968–1969 Assistant professor of radiology, University of Wisconsin Medical School, Madison, Wisconsin

== Administrative roles ==
- 1971–2002 Chief, Neuroradiology Section, Department of Radiological Sciences, UCLA School of Medicine, Los Angeles, California
- 1986–1992 Chief, Neuro/Angio Division, Department of Radiological Sciences, UCLA School of Medicine, Los Angeles, California
- 1984–1986 Chief, Division of Diagnostic Radiology, UCLA School of Medicine, Los Angeles, California
- 1972–1977 Faculty supervisor, Photography Laboratory, Department of Radiological Sciences, UCLA School of Medicine, Los Angeles, California
- 1970–1971 Acting chief, Neuroradiology Section, Department of Radiological Sciences, UCLA School of Medicine, Los Angeles, California
- 1968–1969 Chief, Neuroradiology, University of Wisconsin, Medical School, Madison, Wisconsin

== Honors and awards ==
- Leo G. Rigler Teaching Award, July 1995
- Roche Award, 1960
