= COVID-19 pandemic in Indonesia =

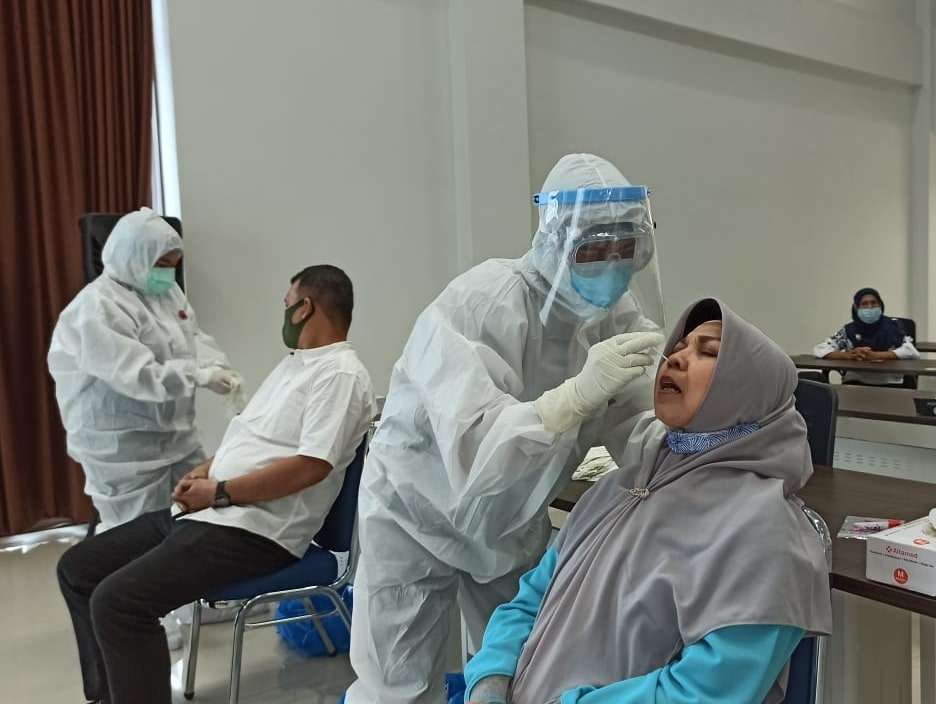
- Health workers collect mucosal swab sample a COVID-19 test in Padang, West Sumatra
- Disease: COVID-19
- Pathogen: SARS-CoV-2
- Location: Indonesia
- First outbreak: Wuhan, Hubei, China
- Index case: Kemang, Jakarta
- Arrival date: 2 March 2020 (6 years, 8 months and 4 days)
- Deaths: At least 1 million (excess deaths)

Government website
- National: covid19.go.id covid19.bnpb.go.id covid19.kemkes.go.id Local: see cases by province

The COVID-19 pandemic in Indonesia is part of the worldwide pandemic of coronavirus disease 2019 (COVID-19) caused by severe acute respiratory syndrome coronavirus 2 (SARS-CoV-2). It was confirmed to have spread to Indonesia on 2 March 2020, after a dance instructor and her mother tested positive for the virus. Both were infected from a Japanese national.

By 9 April 2020, the pandemic had spread to all 34 provinces in the country at that time. Jakarta, West Java, and Central Java are the worst-hit provinces, together accounting more than half of the national total cases. On 13 July 2020, the recoveries exceeded active cases for the first time.

The number of deaths may be much higher than what has been reported as those who died with acute COVID-19 symptoms but had not been confirmed or tested were not counted in the official death figure.

Instead of implementing a nationwide lockdown, the government applied "Large-Scale Social Restrictions" (Indonesian: Pembatasan Sosial Berskala Besar, abbreviated as PSBB), which was later modified into the "Community Activities Restrictions Enforcement" (Indonesian: Pemberlakuan Pembatasan Kegiatan Masyarakat, abbreviated as PPKM). On 30 December 2022, the restrictions were lifted for all regions in Indonesia since satisfied population immunity exceeded the expectation, although it did not lift the pandemic status.

On 13 January 2021, President Joko Widodo was vaccinated at the presidential palace, officially kicking off Indonesia's vaccination program. As of 5 February 2023 at 18:00 WIB (UTC+7), 204,266,655 people had received the first dose of the vaccine and 175,131,893 people had been fully vaccinated; 69,597,474 of them had been inoculated with the booster or the third dose.

The pandemic is estimated to have caused at least 1 million excess deaths in Indonesia.

== Background ==
On 12 January 2020, the World Health Organization (WHO) confirmed that a novel coronavirus was the cause of a respiratory illness in a cluster of people in Wuhan, Hubei, China, which was reported to the WHO on 31 December 2019.

The case fatality ratio for COVID-19 has been much lower than SARS of 2003, but the transmission has been significantly greater, with a significant total death toll.

== Timeline ==
From January until February 2020, Indonesia reported zero cases of COVID-19, despite being surrounded by infected countries such as Malaysia, Singapore, the Philippines, and Australia. Flights from countries with high infection rate, including South Korea and Thailand, also continued to operate. Health experts and researchers at Harvard University in the United States expressed their concerns, saying that Indonesia is ill-prepared for an outbreak and there could be undetected COVID-19 cases.

On 2 March 2020, Indonesian president Joko Widodo announced the first cases in the country: a dance instructor and her mother in Depok, West Java. Both of them had held a dance class at a restaurant in Kemang, South Jakarta on 14 February, which was attended by more than a dozen people. One of whom was a Japanese, who was later tested positive for COVID-19 in Malaysia. As Malaysia reported the case, the government of Indonesia began to trace anyone who have had close contact with the Japanese and the infected Indonesians.

The cluster was initially identified as the "Jakarta cluster" or the "dance class cluster", owing to the location of the infection. Since then, confirmed cases of COVID-19 in Indonesia began to increase slowly. By 8 March, a total of 6 people who had attended the dance class were infected by the COVID-19, including one case of repatriated Indonesian from the Diamond Princess. Several COVID-19 cases in West Java and Jakarta were found to have a link with the cluster.

The positive cases first confirmed in March are not the first Indonesians to have been infected with the SARS-CoV-2 virus. In January, an Indonesian maid in Singapore contracted the virus from her employer.

The first confirmed death of COVID-19 in the country occurred on 11 March when a 53-year-old British citizen in Bali died. However, a Telkom employee who died on 3 March was found positive on 14 March.

== Classifications ==
=== Cases ===
Since 14 July 2020, the Ministry of Health of the Republic of Indonesia classifies people involved with COVID-19 into four levels:

- A suspect is a person showing symptoms of respiratory infections, and has stayed within 14 days in any country or any region in Indonesia with local transmission and/or has established contact within 14 days with a confirmed or probable case and/or requires treatment at the hospital and has no possible diagnosis of other diseases.
- A probable case is a person, alive or deceased, who shows or showed obvious signs of COVID-19 symptoms and awaiting results of his or her swab test.
- A confirmed case is a person whose sample produced positive results based on swab or molecular rapid test. A confirmed case may be symptomatic or asymptomatic. Due to lower accuracy and higher chance of false positives, a positive rapid or antibody test is not counted into the official number of cases.
- A close contact is a person who established contact with a probable or confirmed case between 2 days before and 14 days after symptoms show up, or the date of testing for asymptomatic cases. The close contact must quarantine for 14 days. Reclassification into suspect may be done should if the person show symptoms.

Other classifications include:

- A recovered case is recorded after a confirmed case is discharged from isolation. For an asymptomatic case, it is 10 days after a sample testing; for a symptomatic case, it is after a swab test or 10 days after onset of symptoms, and at least 3 days after no fever or respiratory difficulties.
- Death is recorded after someone who had been confirmed COVID-19 positive died. People who were classified into probable case's deaths are not counted in the official tally.

=== Location ===
According to the Ministry of Domestic Affairs, a regency or municipality may be classified into three levels depending on the severity of COVID-19 cases within the region, according to these parameters:

- The number of positive cases within 14 days
- The number of suspected cases within 14 days
- The number of deaths buried according to COVID-19 protocol within 14 days
- Threat of disease contagions to healthcare workers

Each has a score of 15 points for increasing trends, 20 for stationary trends, and 25 for decreasing trends.

The three levels were assigned to a specific region:

- Red Zone if the total score reaches below 80 points. Large-scale social restrictions may be enforced.
- Yellow Zone if the total score reaches 80 to 95 points.
- Green Zone if the total score reaches 100 points (all 4 parameters show a decreasing trend).

== Cases ==
=== Confirmed cases ===
Jakarta became the first province that confirmed COVID-19 cases, while Gorontalo was the last to do so. On 6 July 2020, Jambi became the last province to report a death, 53 days after the penultimate province East Nusa Tenggara did. West Java and Banten had ever reported 16,251 cases and 22,667 recoveries in a day respectively; both are the highest by a single province. Central Java hold the record for death numbers with 679. All six provinces in Java have the highest number of cases compared to other provinces, making it the worst-affected region in the country.

=== Suspected cases ===
Several travellers who had visited or transited through Bali later tested positive for SARS-CoV-2 shortly after their return to China, Japan, New Zealand, and Singapore.

An additional 50 to 70 people were put under surveillance after coming into contact with the first two confirmed COVID-19 patients. This number includes those who had visited Mitra Keluarga Hospital in Depok, the hospital the two confirmed patients were previously admitted to before being transferred to North Jakarta.

A 37-year-old man who died in a hospital in Semarang suspected of having COVID-19 reportedly tested negative, and was instead afflicted by swine flu, probably picked up from recent travels to Spain.

In West Sumatra, two people who returned from abroad died at Padang's Dr. M. Djamil Central General Hospital. On 13 March, a woman who was being treated as a suspect of COVID-19 after returning from Umrah died. On 16 March, a 47-year-old man from Kuala Lumpur, Malaysia landed at Minangkabau International Airport, showing symptoms of COVID-19. He was subsequently hospitalized at Padang's hospital and died on the same day.

== Responses ==
=== International ===
==== WHO ====
Director-General of the World Health Organization Tedros Adhanom Ghebreyesus sent a letter to President Jokowi on 10 March 2020, urging countries with large populations, like Indonesia, to focus on increasing capacity of laboratoriums to detect cases of infection. Early detection is a key factor in limiting the spread of the virus as authorities are able to identify clusters faster. WHO gave advices, such as improving the mechanism of emergency responses, including asking for Indonesia to declare a national emergency situation as soon as possible, educating people and actively communicating while applying the appropriate risk communication measures, involving the local communities more, intensifying COVID-19 tracings, performing lab decentralization so that quick response teams can quickly map spread and clusters, and sharing detailed data on measures of the government in supervision and examination, including identification of patient contacts and summary of tracing patient contacts.

==== International aid ====
On 21 March 2020, the Asian Development Bank through the Asia-Pacific Disaster Response Fund granted US$3 million to Indonesia to counter COVID-19. The grant is a part of a $6.5 billion initial package prepared by ADB on 18 March 2020 to aid developing countries in countering COVID-19.

As of 24 April 2020, the COVID-19 Response Acceleration Task Force has received US$77.49 million from 9 countries, 9 international organizations, and 70 NGOs.

=== Central government ===
==== Early responses ====
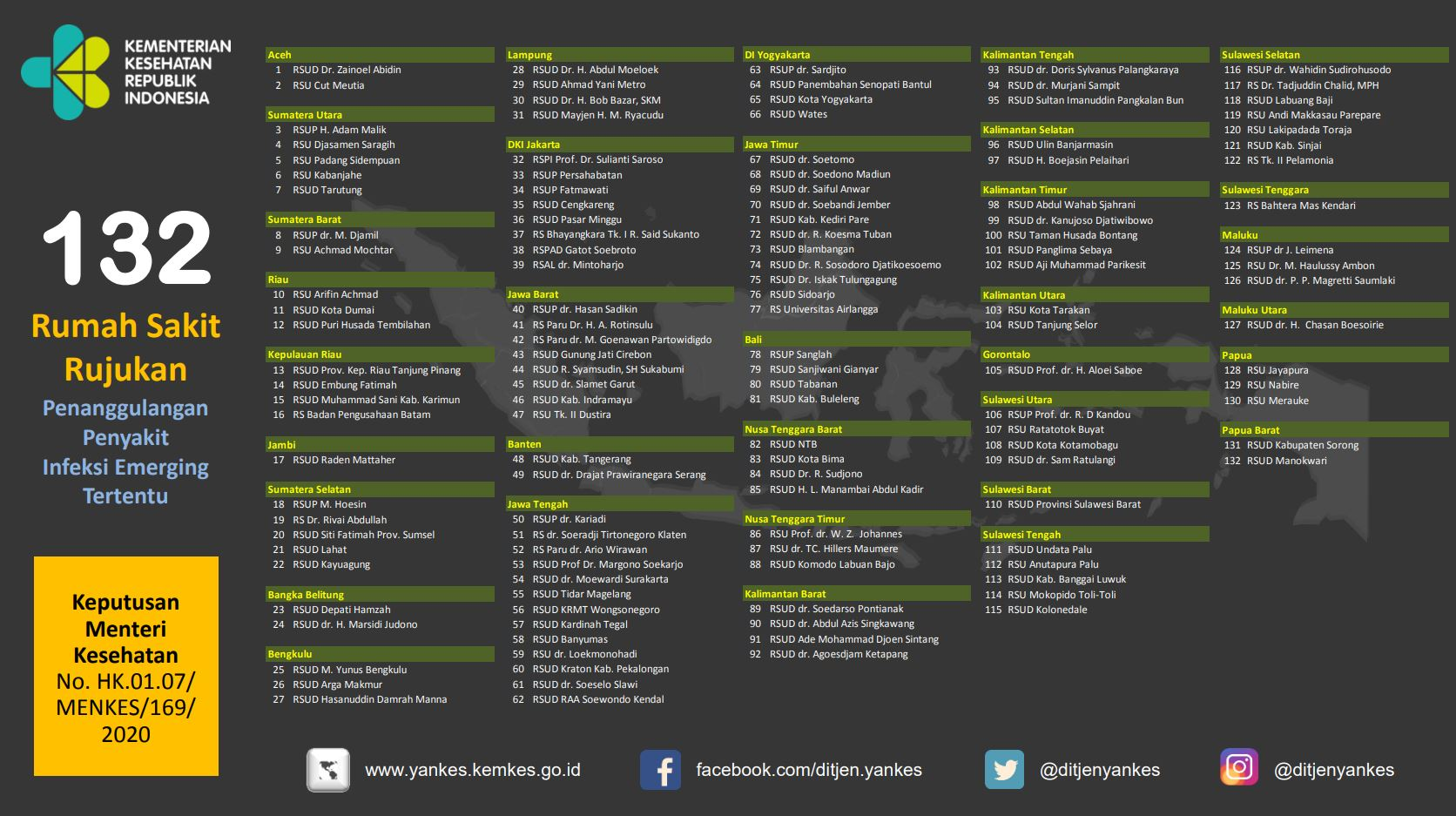
Treatment Facilities List

Indonesia banned all flights from and to mainland China starting from 5 February 2020. The government also stopped giving free visa and visa on arrival for Chinese nationals. Those who live or have stayed in mainland China in the previous 14 days were barred from entering or transiting through Indonesia. Indonesians were discouraged from travelling to China.

On 6 March, the government announces 5 main protocols relating to COVID-19, which are health protocols, communication protocols, border control protocols, education institution protocols, and public area and transportation protocols.

Starting on 8 March, travel restrictions expanded to include Daegu and Gyeongsangbuk-do in South Korea, Lombardy, Veneto and Emilia-Romagna regions of Italy, and Tehran and Qom in Iran. Visitors with travel history within these countries but outside the aforementioned regions have to provide a valid health certificate during check-in for all transportation into Indonesia. Despite the restriction on travellers from South Korea, Indonesia was still allowing flights from the country.

The Ministry of Health ordered the installation of thermal scanners for at least 135 airport gates and port docks, and announced that provisioning over 100 hospitals with isolation rooms (to WHO-recommended standards) would begin. Starting on 4 March, Jakarta MRT also began scanning the temperature of passengers entering the stations and denying access to those with symptoms of high fever. Other public places such as mall and school also began to scan people at all their entrances.

After the first victim died, the Indonesian government admitted that they had difficulties in detecting incoming imported cases on airports, doing contact tracing and also location history for each case.

The Indonesian government announced on 4 March that it planned to turn a site on Galang Island, previously used as a refugee camp for Vietnamese asylum seekers into a 1,000-bed medical facility specially equipped to handle the COVID-19 pandemic and other infectious diseases.

On 13 March, the government designated 132 treatment facilities across Indonesia. On the same day, President Jokowi announces Presidential Decree No. 7 Year 2020 on the COVID-19 Response Acceleration Task Force, establishing the task force and appointing then- Chief of BNPB Doni Monardo as its head. On the same day, Minister of Home Affairs Tito Karnavian urged all of Indonesia's regional leaders to suspend all non-essential travel to foreign country.

On 15 March, President Jokowi called on all Indonesians to practice what epidemiologists call social distancing to slow the spread of COVID-19 in the country. Indonesian tax authorities announced that they would move back the tax reporting deadline to 30 April 2020.

On 16 March, the Ministry of State-Owned Enterprises instructed its employees aged 50 and over to work from home. President Jokowi also clarified that the decision to implement lockdown on cities or regencies are only to be made after consultation with the central government.

As schools were closing in some regions, Minister of Education Nadiem Makarim announced the readiness of the Ministry of Education to assist schools in online learning by providing free teaching platforms. Minister of Finance Sri Mulyani also announced a shifting of infrastructure budget of IDR 1 trillion into healthcare and pandemic prevention.

Former 2018 Asian Games athletes village turned into COVID-19 hospital.

On 17 March, COVID-19 health protocols have been released to public. Ministry of Foreign Affairs also expanded the travel restrictions to temporary abolish visa free entry to Indonesia for one month and deny transit or arrival for visitors who have been in Iran, Italy, Vatican City, Spain, France, Germany, Switzerland, and United Kingdom within the past 14 days.

On 18 March, the government launched COVID-19.go.id site, an official source of accurate information on controlling the spread of COVID-19 in Indonesia. 227 additional hospitals (109 military hospitals, 53 police hospitals and 65 state-owned enterprises hospitals) were provisioned to cover more patients across the country. The Ministry of Finance also announced that Kemayoran Athletes Village, a former athlete's housing for the 2018 Asian Games would be converted to house COVID-19 patients who show only mild symptoms after consultation from doctors. The conversion was officially completed on 23 March.

On 19 March, Bank of Indonesia decided to slash the bank rate to 4.5%, in addition to 6 other fiscal policies, in the attempt to shore up the economy amidst the COVID-19 crisis. In a limited cabinet meeting, President Jokowi decided that the government will import COVID-19 rapid test kits. Out of a 1 million target, 500,000 has been imported from China by the Indonesian state-owned enterprise PT RNI and has arrived in Indonesia in stages since 20 March. Rapid test kits using mucus samples are also ordered from Swiss which would arrive by late March. Chief of the Indonesian National Police Idham Azis published a notice for all officers to enforce social distancing by dispersing assemblies at public places.

On 20 March, the government ordered 2 million Avigan pills, after previously having ordered 5000. The government has also ordered 3 million Klorokuin pills.

Pharmaceutical state-owned enterprise PT RNI produced 4.7 million masks which would be available by late March. Meanwhile, temporary hospitals were prepared. Patra Comfort Hotel with a capacity of 52 beds was converted, Pertamina Jaya Hospital prepared an old building as a COVID ward with a capacity of 65 beds, and the Athletes' Village was targeted ready to be used as a hospital by 23 March with a capacity of 1000–2000. It was ready on time, and by 26 March was tending to 208 patients out of a capacity of roughly 3000.

LIPI published a tentative list of household cleaning products which can be used as disinfectants against corona. LIPI also described how to properly dilute those products.

On 27 March, the government was mulling over a plan to ban the 2020 mudik to prevent city dwellers from spreading the coronavirus to towns and villages across the archipelago.

On 30 March, President Widodo refused to impose lockdown on Jakarta. Bus routes connecting Jakarta and other cities and provinces will remain open following the cancellation of a plan to temporarily suspend operations of Greater Jakarta-based intercity and interprovincial (AKAP) buses.

On 31 March, Indonesia announced IDR 405 trillion COVID-19 budget, anticipates a 5% deficit in a historic move. The government was to allocate IDR 75 trillion for healthcare spending, IDR 110 trillion for social protection, and IDR 70.1 trillion for tax incentives and credit for enterprises. The largest chunk, IDR 150 trillion, was to be set aside for economic recovery programs including credit restructuring and financing for small and medium businesses.

On 13 April, President Jokowi declared COVID-19 as a national disaster after it infected 4,557 individuals and caused 399 deaths in Indonesia. Prof. Mahfud MD as Coordinating Ministry for Political, Legal, and Security Affairs said the national disaster could not be used as a justification for claiming force majeure and thereby evading obligations under contracts.

On 21 April, President Jokowi announced his decision to ban the 2020 mudik starting from 24 April to curb the spread of COVID-19 ahead of Ramadan. To help with this effort, travel by intercity bus travel was banned until 31 May, commercial and charter flights until 1 June, sea transportation until 8 June, and long-distance passenger trains until 15 June.

In late April, President Jokowi asked the United States for medical equipment, including ventilators via phone call to President Donald Trump, to which President Trump, on 24 April, responded he would provide and also reiterated the intent to strengthen economic cooperation between the two.

==== Vaccination efforts ====
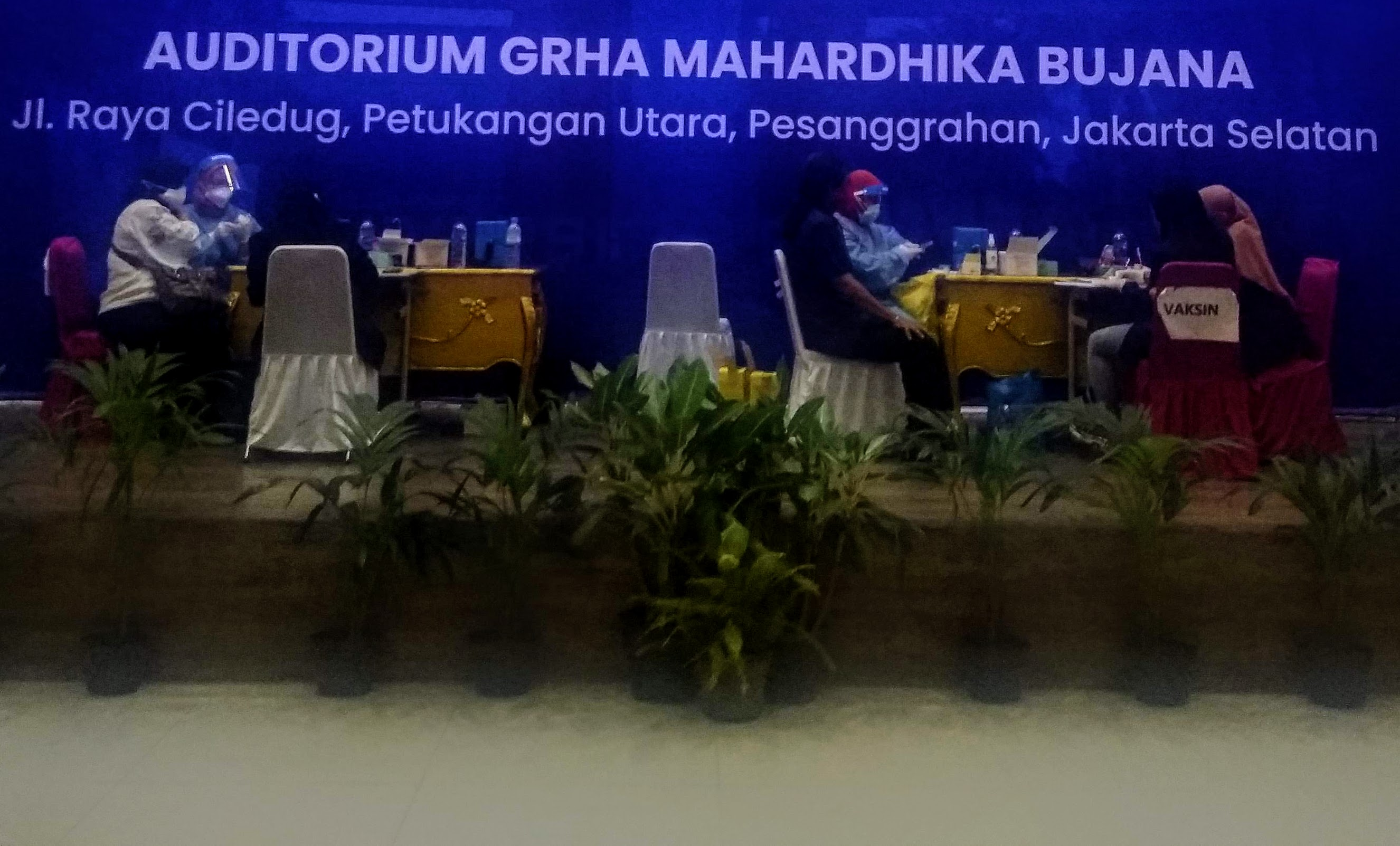
COVID-19 vaccination in South Jakarta.

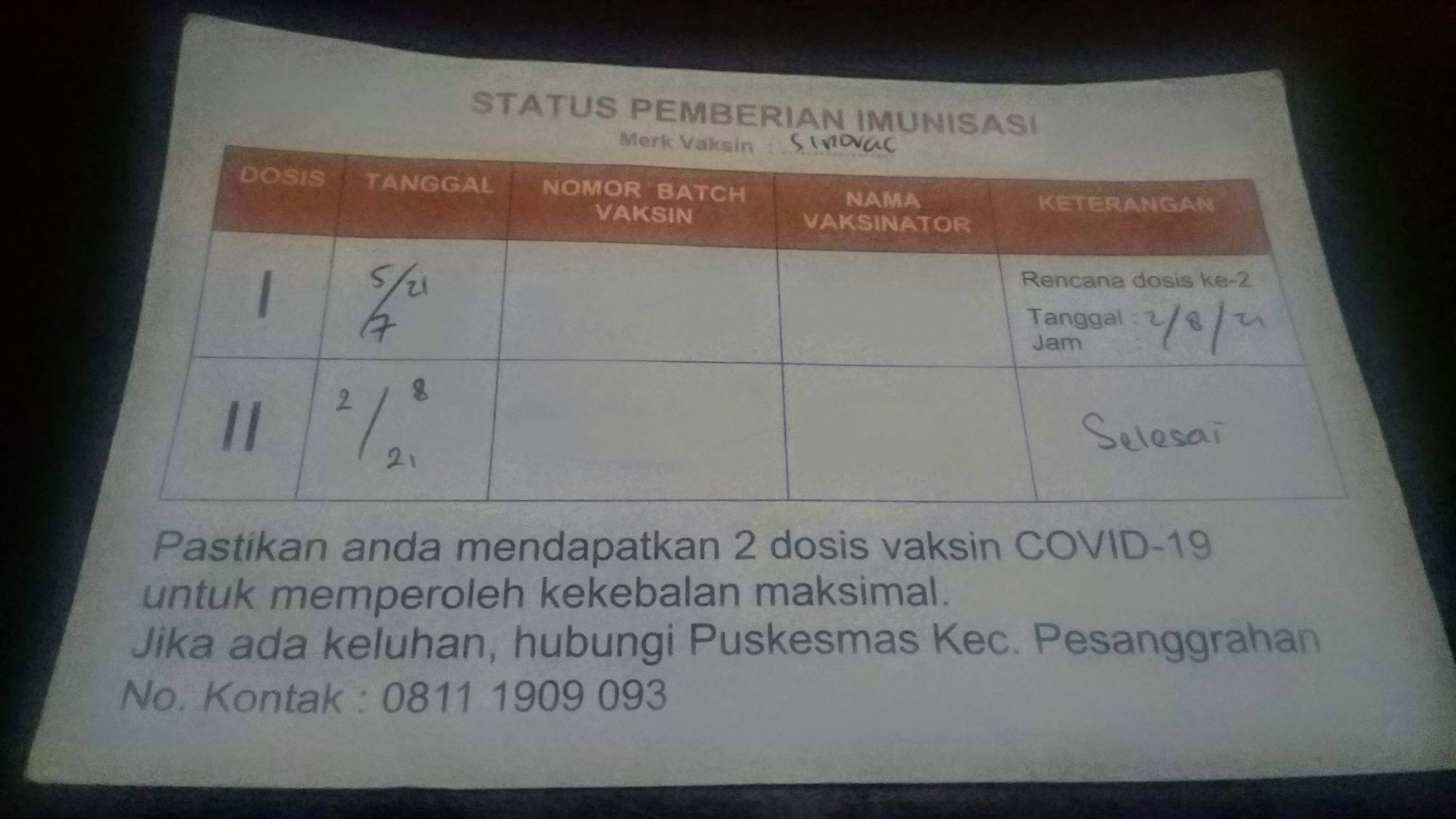
COVID-19 vaccine card in Indonesia.

COVID-19 vaccination in Indonesia was started on 13 January 2021, when President Joko Widodo was vaccinated at the presidential palace.

==== Stimulus policy ====
===== Phase 1 =====
To reduce the impact of COVID-19 pandemic to the national economy, on 25 February, the government released an IDR 10.3 trillion stimulus policy to the tourism sector, in the form of ticket price discounts and restaurant tax deductions. The IDR 10.3 trillion budget is given to provide discounted airplane ticket prices for 10 tourist destinations, such as Batam, Denpasar, Yogyakarta, Labuan Bajo, Lombok, Malang, Manado, Lake Toba (Silangit Airport), Tanjung Pandan, and Tanjungpinang, which applies from March to May 2020. Ticket prices for low-cost airlines are discounted by 50%, medium-service by 48%, and full-service by 45%. Specifically for this ticket price discount, the stimulus fund comes from the IDR 444.39 billion state budget (APBN) for a discounted value of 30% and 25% of passengers per flight. Additionally, there were additional IDR 100 billion ticket discounts paid by Angkasa Pura I and Angkasa Pura II and IDR 260 billion PT Pertamina paid through jet fuel price discounts, so the total ticket price stimulus was IDR 960 billion, so that the ticket price could be discounted by 50%.

The stimulus in the form of restaurant taxes borne by the central government was also provided amounting IDR 3.3 trillion. Thus, there was no restaurant tax in the ten tourist destinations above, but as compensation, the local government were to be given a grant from the central government.

===== Phase 2 =====
On 14 March. the government released an IDR 22.9 trillion stimulus policy. Among other policies, the government will bear 100% of the income tax of workers in the manufacturing sector with income up to IDR 17 million/month. This tax will be borne by the government or 6 months, from April to September, so the government will spend IDR 8,6 trillion.

Besides fiscal stimus, the government also provided nonfiscal stimulus such as simplification of health certificates and V-legals, and reduction of export restrictions and prohibitions of 749 HS codes (443 fishery commodity HS codes and 306 logging industry HS codes). Simplifications as well as reduction of restrictions and prohibitions of raw material imports were also given to producers of steel, alloys, industrial salt, and powdered sugar. 735 export-import companies deemed reputable were given export-import process accelerations through automatic response and approval as well as write-off of surveyor reports. There were also general improvement and acceleration of export-import process service and supervision through the national logistics system.

===== Phase 3 =====
On 20 March 2020, the government is effectively able to use realocated state budget funds amounting to IDR 118.3-121.3 trillion to address the pandemic. The funds were realocated from funds for agency and ministry official travels, nonoperational expenses, and honorary employees amounting to IDR 62.3 trillion and village as well as regional transfers amounting to IDR 56-59 trillion.

IDR 38 trillion of the realocated funds will be used for education, social safety net, and healthcare. IDR 6.1 trillion will be used for insurance of healthcare workers. BNPB will get an additional budget of IDR 3.3 trillion to address the pandemic. Some of the allocated village funds, amounting to IDR 72 trillion, will also be allocated to especially impacted villages.

==== Medical devices incentives ====
On 20 March 2020, the Directorate General of Customs and Excise centralized permits of imports of medical devices for handling the pandemic to BNPB. Ministries/agencies, nonprofits, noncommercial private initiatives, and individuals can obtain medical device import tax allowance with a recommendation from BNPB. However, this tax allowance does not apply to commercial private initiatives and individuals and still requires permit from BNPB.

Fiscal incentives for medical device imports including import duty exemptions, value-added tax exemptions, and write-off of import trading administrations which would have to go through the Ministry of Trade, BPOM, and the Ministry of Health. Medical devices included in this policy includes drugs, PPEs, face masks, and rapid test kits.

==== Economic recovery policies ====
To recover from the economic impacts of the pandemic, the government planned to budget IDR 677 trillion for recovery policies. Economic growth for the period was projected to be similar to during the 1997 crisis. Because the revised 2020 state budget was projected to grow by IDR 124.5 trillion, the 2020 state budget deficit reached IDR 1039.2 trillion or up to 6.34% of GDP after a revision to Presidential Decree No. 54/2020. Before that, as explained by Minister of Finance Sri Mulyani, the state budget deficit was IDR 859.2 trillion or 5.07% of GDP. Consequently, the debt financing to cover the deficit increased from IDR 1006.4 trillion to IDR 1220.3 trillion, an increase of IDR 213.9 trillion. The increase is used to cover the deficit increase and for additional investment financing. Initially, state revenue was projected to be IDR 1,760.9 trillion, but was revised to IDR 1,699.1 trillion. Expenses was revised from IDR 2,613.8 trillion to IDR 2,738.4 trillion. Revenue from taxes was projected to reach IDR 1,404.5 trillion. Until June, Bank Indonesia has purchased government bonds in support of economic recovery. World Bank projected that Indonesia's debt ratio will rise by 37%, influenced by the widening of state budget deficit, retardation of economic growth, and weakening of the rupiah. Social and economic policies would also need a huge amount of funds. The deficit projection of up to 6.34% of GDP will be steadily lowered to 4.7% in 2021, 3.4% in 2022, and under 3% in 2023. According to Governor of Bank Indonesia Perry Warjiyo, Indonesian can avoid a recession if the new normal scheme goes according to plan, and economic growth can reach the estimate, which is 3.2%, as long as the curve flattens.

==== New normal ====
On 21 May, the government announced that Indonesia enters the new normal stage. They emphasize that this does not mean loosening of PSBB. Previously, President Jokowi has asked people to learn to live with COVID-19.

In July 2020, the government considered that the phrase "new normal" is a "wrong diction" to describe changes of behaviour post-pandemic. In substitution, they decided to use "adaptation to new habits" (adaptasi kebiasaan baru). COVID-19 Response Acceleration Task Force speaker Yurianto considered that the public would focus on the word "normal" which can be taken to mean "perform activities like usual without paying attention to health protocols".

=== Regional government ===
==== Area of emergency ====
- Jakarta: 20 March – 19 April
- Depok: 18 March – 29 May
- Yogyakarta: 20 March – 29 May
- Bogor: 15 March – 29 May
- East Java: 14 March – 29 May
- Banten: 15 March – 29 May
- East Kalimantan: 18 March – 29 May
- West Kalimantan: 10 March – 29 May
- West Java: 19 March – 29 May
- Papua: 17 March – 17 April
- Aceh: 20 March – 29 May
- North Sumatra: 31 March – 29 May
- South Kalimantan: 22 March – 29 May

==== Large-scale social restrictions ====
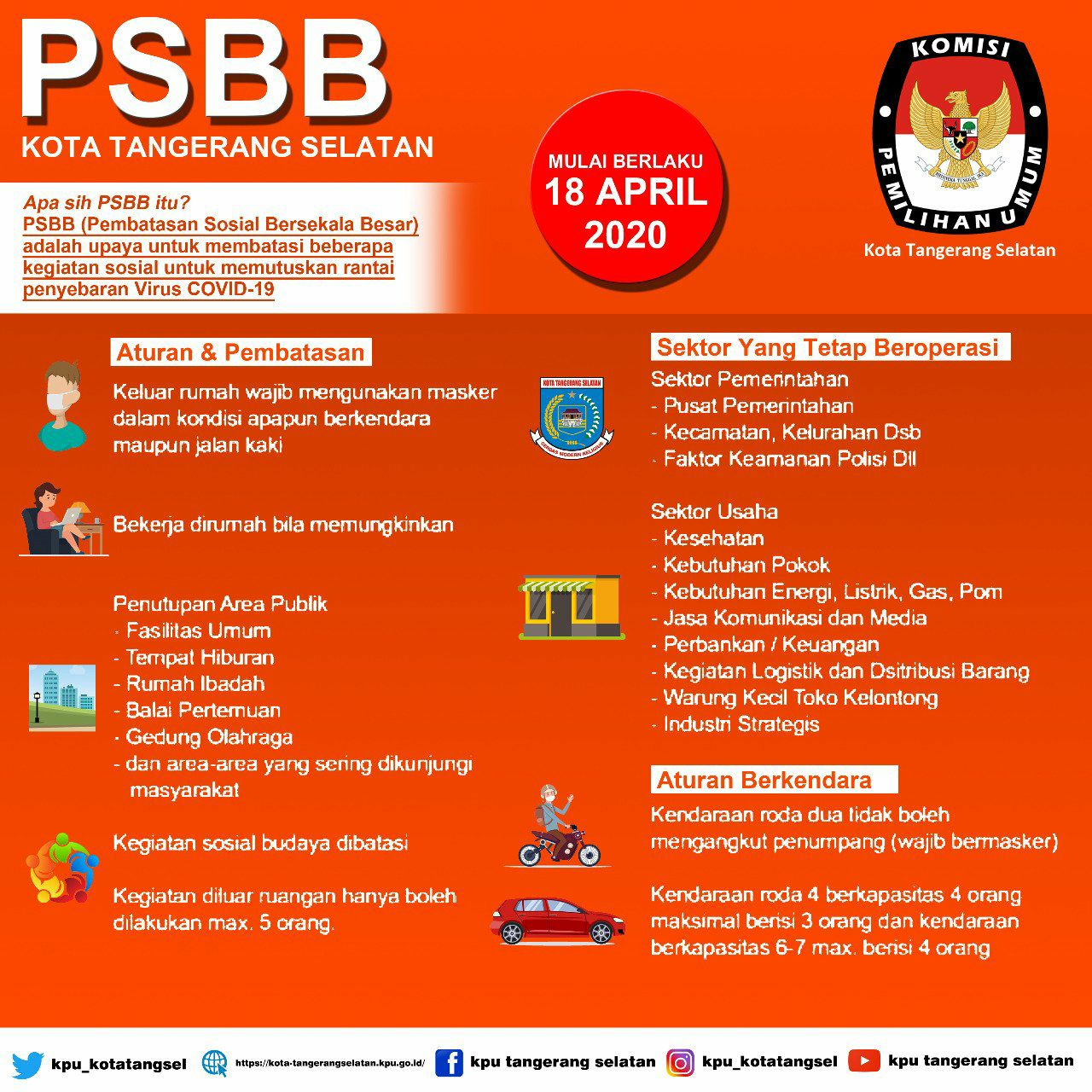
Example of do's and don'ts during the PSBB/LSSR period issued by Indonesia's General Elections Commission in South Tangerang.

Specific regions can apply for a request for large-scale social restrictions (PSBB/LSSR) to the Ministry of Health alongside proof of endemic and mitigation steps. Should it be approved, a date will be set by the local government and will run for at least two weeks.

According to the report, 33 provinces implemented PSBB/LSSR in the first half of 2020, but the results proved that PSBB/LSSR did not have a significant improvement on the decline of cases in the whole country, but it had a great effect on controlling the growth of cases in a certain area, but at the same time it had some negative impact on the lives of the population.

Under the current restrictions, all public transportation options must operate with reduced hours and capacity. Non-essential businesses and stores are required to be closed. Restaurants and food stalls are open for takeaway and delivery only; markets and essential business can may open with social distancing. Depending on the area, private transportation requires a limitation of passengers and a mask obligation will also be in effect.

==== Aceh ====
On 12 March, Aceh acting governor Nova Iriansyah advised Acehnese to stay away from vices and activities that are incompatible with religious and Islamic sharia values.

On 15 March, due to the rapid rise of the number of coronavirus infections in the country, the province of Aceh decided to close schools until further notice.

On 16 March, the city of Sabang started to implement travel restrictions to forbid foreign visitors from traveling to their city.

On 20 March, Nova Iriansyah declared a "province-scale" state of emergency in Aceh for 71 days, lasting until 29 May.

==== Banten ====
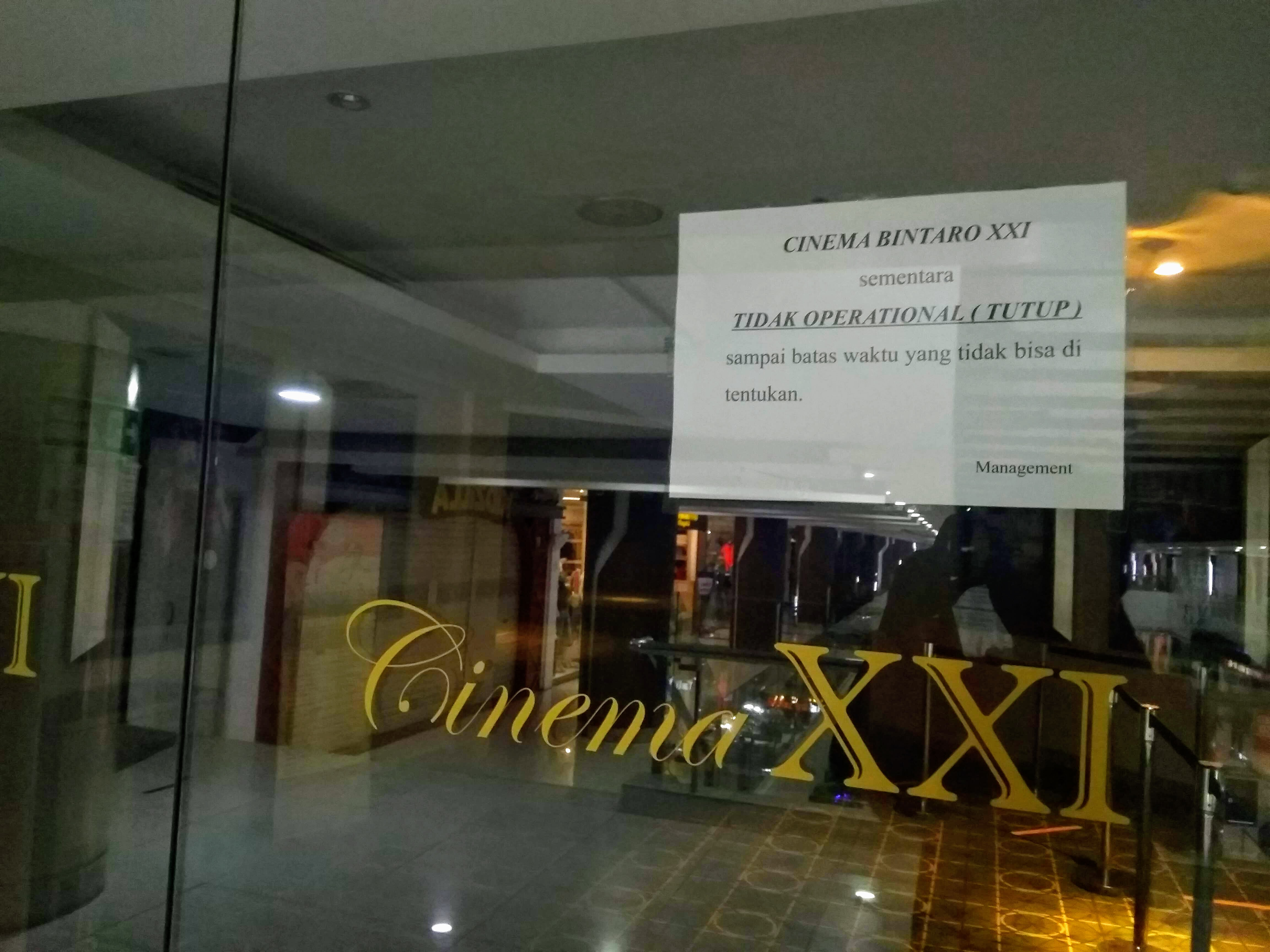
A closed cinema during COVID-19 pandemic in South Tangerang, Banten.

On 15 March, Governor of Banten Wahidin Halim declares "extraordinary event" and decides to close all schools for 2 weeks.

==== Central Java ====
On 13 March, the city of Solo in Central Java decided to close all primary schools (SD) and junior high school's (SMP) for next 2 weeks, after three positive cases are found in the city. The mayor of Solo F. X. Hadi Rudyatmo has also declared that the area is under "extraordinary event". On the same day, the Regency of Sragen decided to close all schools from kindergarten to junior high school throughout the regency for at least a week, while closure of senior high school in the regency would be decided by the provincial government.

On 14 March, Central Java governor Ganjar Pranowo decided to close all kindergarten to junior high schools in the province. High schools would remain open during the examination season. The city of Salatiga followed the same decision on 15 March. The city government would also provide a total of IDR 3 billion for medical support.

On 25 March, the governor announced that schools under control of the provincial government will postpone their opening until 13 April.

On 26 March, the city of Solo, Semarang, Salatiga, and Sukoharjo Regency announced that kindergarten, primary, and junior high school's opening will be postponed until 13 April.

On 27 March, despite statements from President Jokowi that lockdowns are the authority of the central government, mayor of Tegal Dedy Yon Supriyono announced that Tegal would be on lockdown. He ordered that 49 road access to the city to be barricaded with movable concrete barriers, and visitors from outside will be thoroughly checked and have to undergo a 14-day quarantine period. On the other hand, the Governor of Central Java Ganjar Pranowo insisted that the blockade will only happen at some part of the city of Tegal, not on the whole city.

==== DKI Jakarta ====
On 2 March, in response to the confirmed cases, DKI Jakarta governor Anies Baswedan halted the issuance of permits for large gatherings. These including concerts by Foals, Babymetal, Head in the Clouds, and Dream Theater.

On 13 March, after 69 positive COVID-19 cases, several tourist destinations in Jakarta including Ancol Dreamland, multiple government-managed museums, Ragunan Zoo and Monas were closed for 2 weeks. The Islamic organization Muhammadiyah formed a "command center" allocating 20 hospitals in the country to handle the outbreak, with the center being led by emergency medicine specialist Corona Rintawan.

On 14 March, Jakarta governor Anies Baswedan decided to suspend all school activities and examinations for two weeks in response to prevent further spread of the virus in the capital city of Jakarta.

On 15 March, Jakarta provincial government prepared 500 to 1,000 beds for Patient Under Investigation (PUI) that will be placed on designated COVID-19 treatment facilities.

On 16 March, MRT Jakarta, LRT and TransJakarta started to reduce number of trips, corridors and timetables (06.00 – 18.00), however, this policy was retracted due to long queue in many bus stops and train stations in morning. Odd-even policy will be halted during outbreak.

On 20 March, Anies Baswedan declared a state of emergency in Jakarta for the next 14 days, lasting until 2 April.

On 28 March, Jakarta provincial government extends the state of emergency until 19 April.

On 2 April, Anies Baswedan allocated IDR 3 trillion to fight the COVID-19 pandemic, and the budget will be used to fund the city's fight against the virus up until May this year, by gradually allocating IDR 1.3 trillion and an additional IDR 2 trillion

Jakarta's application for curfew was approved by the Ministry of Health on 7 April and is set to take effect from Friday, 10 April for at least two weeks.

On 21 April, the local government prepared 136 schools as isolation areas for COVID-19 and the policy is currently still a proposal waiting for approval from the Education Office.

On 9 September, Anies decided to reimpose large-scale social restrictions starting from 14 September due to the high spike of COVID-19 cases in the province.

==== East Java ====
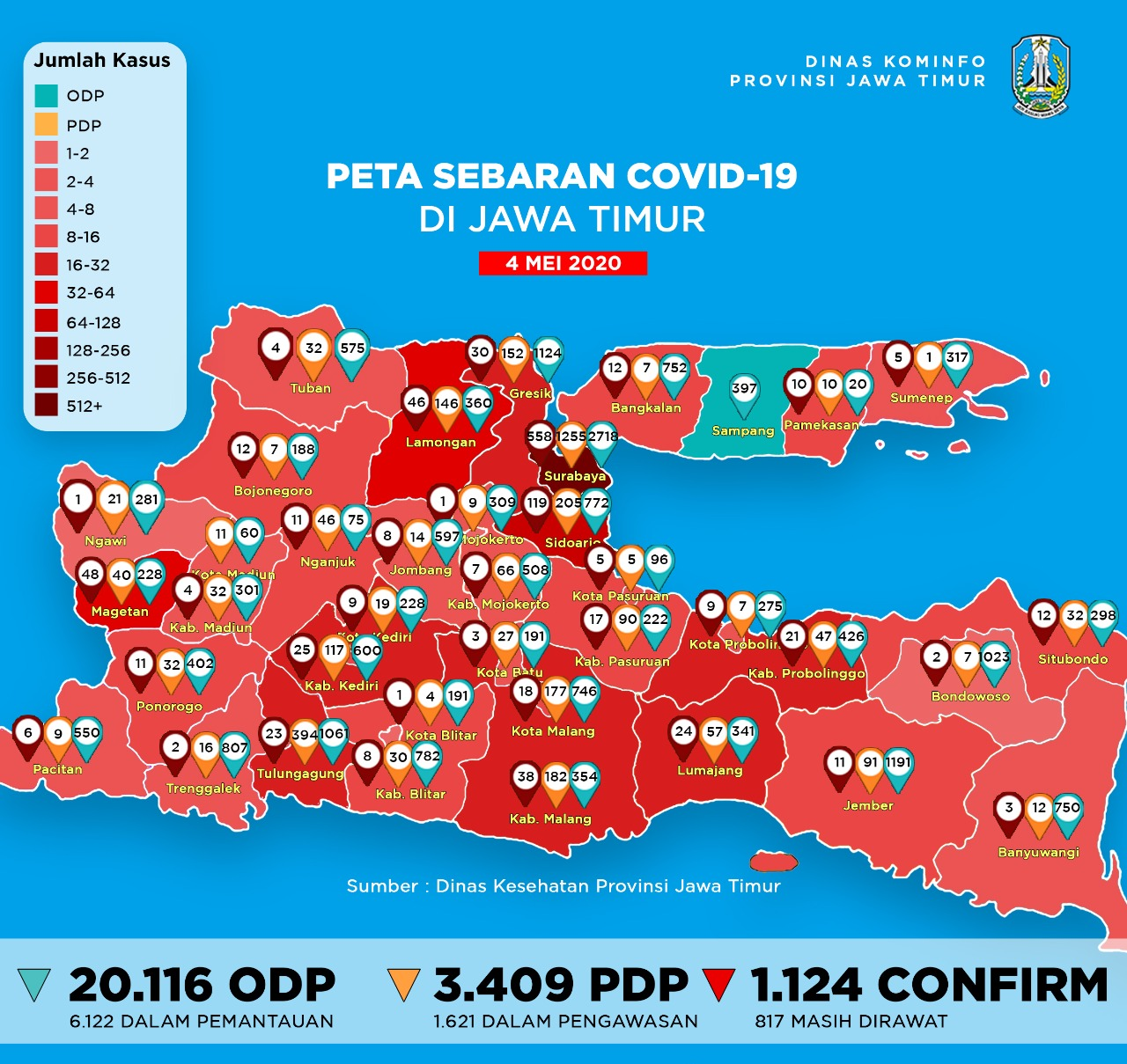
Location of confirmed and suspected COVID-19 cases in East Java (4 May 2020).

On 15 March, the city of Malang announced that they will close all schools for two weeks. The closure will begin on 16 March.

On the same day, the Governor of East Java Khofifah Indar Parawansa ordered the closure of all schools throughout the province. Educational institutions were advised to cancel any kind of student exchange until an indefinite time. However national examination in the province would not be postponed.

On 16 March, the mayor of Malang Sutiaji decided to close all access to the city (lockdown), starting on 18 March. As of 16 March, there is no positive COVID-19 in Malang or the province of East Java. He would later clarify that the lockdown only applies to the government of Malang, not the general populace.

On 20 March, Khofifah declared a state of emergency for East Java.

==== North Sumatra ====
On 31 March, the provincial government of North Sumatra declared a state of emergency until 29 May 2020.

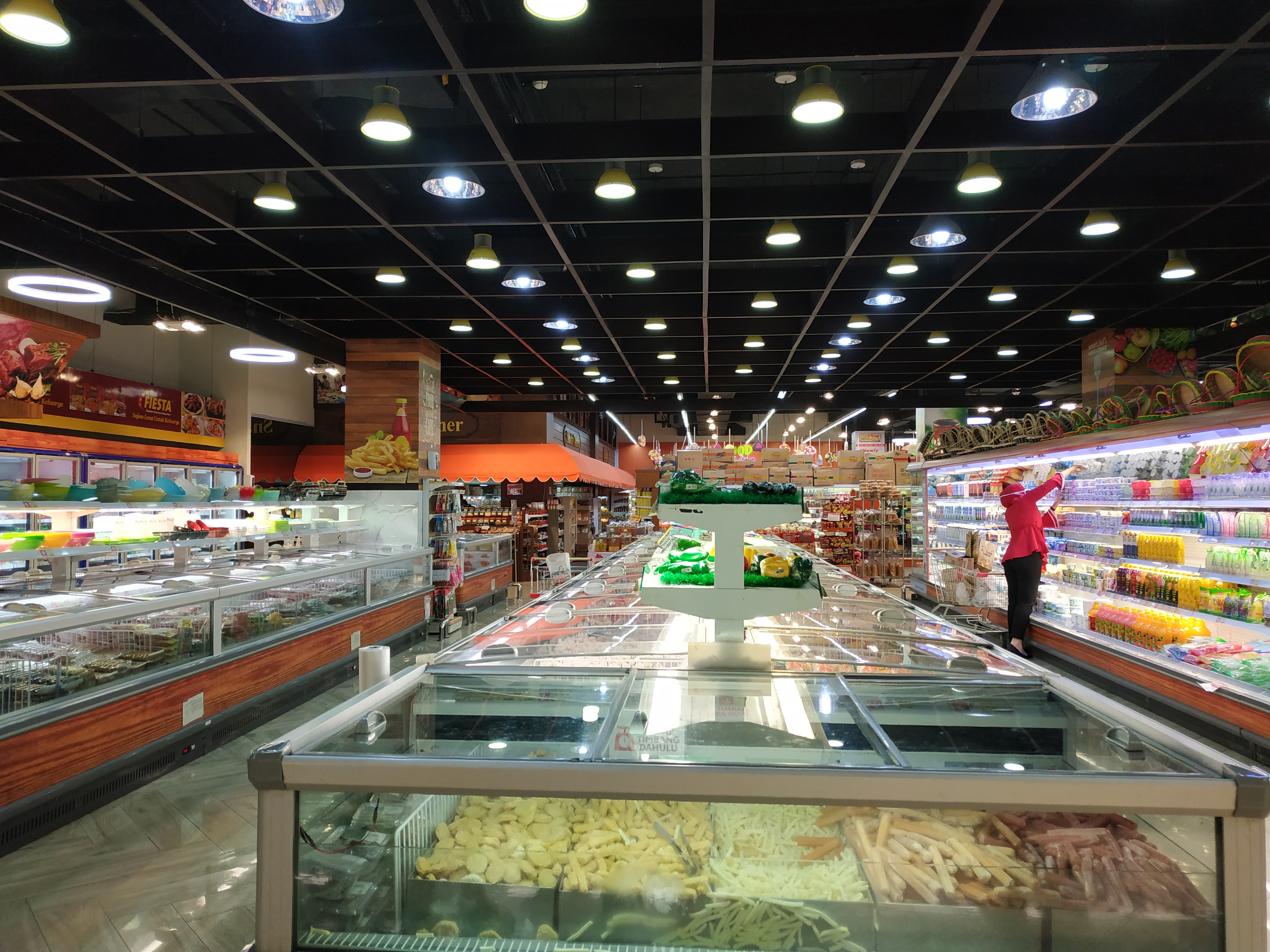
A shopping center in Medan, as restrictions were implemented.

==== Papua ====
On 24 March, the provincial government of Papua decided to close any in and out access to Papua except for logistics and medical workers starting from 26 March for 14 days. Indonesian Minister of Home Affairs Tito Karnavian disagreed with the decision, saying that the central government's advice to the regional governments is not to close transportation, but to ban mass gatherings.

==== South Sumatra ====
On 30 March, Jakabaring Athletes Village, a former athlete's housing for the 2018 Asian Games in Palembang, was appointed by the Governor of South Sumatera Herman Deru to be the house of PUM's treatment (ODP Center). He named it as "COVID-19 Healthy House" (Rumah Sehat COVID-19).

==== West Java ====
On 14 March, the city of Depok and Bogor decided to close all schools from kindergarten to senior high school until 28 March 2020. This decision was also followed by the city of Bandung, in which the city opted to close schools for the next two weeks and advised schools to hold online teachings.

On 15 March, West Java COVID-19 distribution map was released to public. The Regency of Bogor implement "semi-lockdown" on tourist area Puncak for foreign visitors, to prevent them from entering the area. Jalak Harupat, Pakansari and Patriot Chandrabragha stadiums are being prepared for COVID-19 Mass Rapid Test.

Applications for large-scale social distancing for Depok city, Bogor city & regency, and Bekasi city & regency, all of which belong to the Jakarta metropolitan area, were approved on 11 April and will be in effect on 15 April for at least two weeks.

==== West Kalimantan ====
On 15 March, the governor decided to impose quarantine for all students from kindergarten to senior high school level in the province until a date which is yet to be decided. During the quarantine period, students must stay at their homes for studying. An exception is given for final year senior/vocational high school students on their respective national final examinations date.

=== Others ===
==== Rail transport ====
PT KAI and PT KCI has taken several measures to prevent the spread of coronavirus, including gradually cancelling several train journeys starting 21 March. Some commuter line journeys are shortened by KCI and only opened from 06.00 to 20.00 WIB. Starting 21 March, the Palembang LRT trips are also cut from 74 to 54, then 26 starting 1 April. The LRT would operate from 08.39 to 17.27 with a headway of 36 minutes.

Besides that, KAI performed temperature checks on stations. Those with temperatures above 38 °C are prohibited from boarding the train. Trains and other facilities were regularly disinfected. Physical distancing was enforced in trains and other facilities, like limiting lift capacity to 4 people, marking safe distance on lockets, marking space on seats with X signs, and provision of hand sanitizers on corners.

Prospective passengers could cancel tickets without being levied cancellation fees. KAI advises prospective passengers that all cancellations and schedule changes are to be conducted via KAI Access or other external channels. Passengers are also required to wear face masks in stations and on trains.

As of 25 April, all mid-range and long-range train journeys are cancelled—including extra train journeys which have been planned by KAI. Only some local trains are still running with schedule adjustments, operating from morning to afternoon. To fulfill logistical demands during PSBB, KAI operates the freight train service RailExpress in Java, throughout north, central, and south Java.

Starting 12 May to 11 June, KAI operated six Extraordinary Train (Kereta Luar Biasa, KLB) journeys with a route of Jakarta–Surabaya (via Semarang and Yogyakarta) and Bandung–Surabaya—operated outside the schedule of regular train journeys. Prospective passengers who want to board those trains must show permit from the COVID-19 Response Acceleration Task Force during ticket purchase and checking. The permit can be obtained on certain conditions, which are having assignment letter (if travel is for work) or a letter with stamp duty (if not for work), statement letter of tested negative for COVID, identity such as KTP/SIM/passport, travel reason, and time of departure and arrival. Ticket purchase is only served on locket and can only be booked no later than a week before departure.

With Jakarta Gubernatorial Decree No. 47/2020, extraordinary train passengers must also obtain entry-exit permit (surat izin keluar-masuk, SIKM) for departures going to Gambir. Passengers who arrived with incomplete papers must self-isolate for 14 days, and passengers who have incomplete papers on departure station are not allowed to board the train and fees are refunded in full.

In accordance with new normal plans, KAI has designed updated health protocols. Prospective passengers booking mid-range and long-range trains will undergo temperature checks and must wear face masks and shields provided by KAI. Booths will only serve direct sales 3 hours before departure, there are capacity limitations in every train carriage, and it is advised to book tickets online via KAI Access or other external channels. Cleanliness of objects frequently touched by passengers are ensured by spraying disinfectant every 30 minutes. All KAI employees wear PPEs. If a passenger is found to have body temperature above 37.3 °C during a train journey, the passenger will be isolated in a specially designated room in one of the carriages. Passengers are also required to obey social distancing and bring their own sajadah if they want to perform salat in station musalla. Passengers are required to not speak, whether face-to-face or by phone.

During Christmas 2020 and New Year 2021 holidays, KAI collaborated with Rajawali Nusindo (subsidiary of RNI Group) to arrange antigen rapid tests in major stations of Java. This is connected to the enactment of Minister of Transport Circular Letter No. 12/2020.

==== Universities ====
In response of the outbreak, multiple universities opted to cancel classes and instead would teach students online.

On 16 March, at least 17 universities across Indonesia confirmed that conventional face-to-face lectures would be cancelled and would be replaced by online classes. Graduations and gatherings were cancelled and students and lecturers who had gone abroad from countries with confirmed coronavirus cases with any reasons should self-isolate at home. As of 14 March, numerous universities have closed their classes, such as Universitas Indonesia (UI), Universitas Gajah Mada (UGM), Institut Teknologi Bandung (ITB), Institut Teknologi Sepuluh Nopember Surabaya, Universitas Gunadharma, Universitas Multimedia Nusantara (UMN), Sekolah Tinggi Akuntansi Negara (STAN), Kalbis Institut, Binus University, Universitas Atmajaya, London School Public Relations (LSPR), Universitas Yarsi, Universitas Pelita Harapan (UPH), Telkom University, Universitas Atma Jaya Yogyakarta (UAJY), Universitas Hasanuddin (UNHAS), Universitas Tarumanegara (UNTAR), Institut Pertanian Bogor (IPB), and Universitas Al-Azhar Indonesia (UAI). University of Brawijaya (UB), a university in Malang, creates a disinfection chamber as an effort to contain the coronavirus.

==== Corporations ====
On 14 March, Tokopedia and Gojek have begun trial for work at home operations.

On 15 March, Unilever Indonesia announced work-from-home policy for their office site, this policy will be started on 16 March until further notice.

On 16 March, Telkomsel, Bank Mandiri, Indonesian Financial Transaction Reports and Analysis Centre and Bank Indonesia announced work-from-home and split-team policy, these policies will be started on 17 March until further notice.

On 17 March, BNI announced that one of its back office employees, who doesn't directly interact with customers, has tested positive for Covid. Due to this, management adopted three changes to the work system, which are work-from-home, operations separation, and more segregated shifts. The separation and segregated shifts are enacted for main operational and banking services functions, while work-from home is enacted for other divisions, effective in areas deemed high-risk. On the same day, an employee of Bank Mandiri Kyai Tapa, Jakarta branch also tested positive for Covid. The branch was closed until further notice and services diverted to the S. Parman branch.

On 20 March, Bank Permata announced the closure of its central offices in WTC II, Sudirman, Jakarta and had sprayed disinfectant in all rooms after one of its back office employees tested positive for Covid.

Banks advise customers to use e-banking apps of each banks to perform transactions, open savings accounts online via video call, and use ATMs rather than going to bank branches and tellers to reduce chance of infection.

On 23 March, a BCA employee working at the Menara BCA central office tested positive for corona. BCA arranged for all rooms and lifts to be sprayed with disinfectants, and employees working on the same floor are ordered to work from home and have their health closely monitored. Two Indosat employees working at the Merdeka Barat, Jakarta central office tested positive for corona.

On 28 March, Indonesia AirAsia (QZ) suspended all domestic and international flights to overcome the spread of the pandemic. All domestic flights suspended between 1 and 21 April 2020 while international flights between 1 April and 17 May 2020.

Meanwhile, Bank Indonesia changes operational hours effective 30 March to 29 May. The changes include the operational services Bank Indonesia Real Time Gross Settlement (BI-RTGS) system, Bank Indonesia Scriptless Securities Settlement System (BI-SSSS), and Bank Indonesia Electric Trading Platform (BI-ETP) which were previously open until 18.30, changed to 17.30. Sistem Kliring Nasional Bank Indonesia (SKNBI, National Bank Indonesia Clearing System) are also changed from 9 times to 8 times and previously open until 17.00, changed to 15.30, and cash operational services were previously open until 12.00, changed to 11.00.

Some banks also started to trim their operational hours from 8.00 to 15.00 to 9.00 to 15.00, as set by Bank Mandiri effective 23 March. Mandiri also temporarily closed 183 branch offices on 23 March and 287 on 24 March out of 457 in Jakarta. BCA closed 30% of their branch offices in Jakarta from 24 March to 2 April and trimmed operational hours from 8.15 to 15.00 to 8.15 to 14.00.

Mayapada Group founder Dato Sri Tahir donated IDR 52 billion in form of personal protective equipment, medical drugs, disinfectant, operational vehicles and also accommodation.

On 31 March, Grab donated US$10 million to reduce COVID-19 impact in Indonesia.

==== Societal organizations ====
On 16 March, Indonesian Council of Ulama (MUI) and Muhammadiyah urged to substitute Friday prayer with Zuhr prayer and not to attend any religious activities within heavily virus-plagued areas.

On 31 March, Muhammadiyah advised Muslims to not perform tarawih in Ramadan and Idul Fitri prayers.

In April, Ita Fatia Nadia, a historian, established Solidaritas Pangan Jogja, a charity group who focused on distributing health supplies and food to low income informal workers in Yogyakarta. It offered services at eleven locations. The charity was later reported to the police by Kotagede residents because the number of people collecting at these sites was in violation of the COVID restriction on gatherings.

== Travel restrictions ==
Indonesia had denied transit and entry for all foreign visitors since 2 April 2020.

Indonesians who returned from China, South Korea, Italy, Iran, United Kingdom, Vatican City, France, Spain, Germany, and Switzerland were subject to additional health screening and a 14-day stay-at-home notice or quarantine depending on appearing symptoms.

Garuda Indonesia, Citilink, Lion Air, Batik Air, and Sriwijaya Air cancelled several flights and grounded their aircraft. Meanwhile, Indonesia AirAsia cancelled all flights. International airlines have either temporarily suspended services or continue operating with reduced frequency. Other airlines such as China Airlines and Etihad Airways chose to continue their services as usual.

From 24 April until 8 June, the government suspended all passenger to travel outside areas with at least one confirmed case, regions that had imposed large-scale social restrictions (PSBB/LSSR), and those that had been declared COVID-19 red zones. The ban applied to all types of public and private transportation by air, sea, land, and railway, except for vehicles carrying leaders of state institutions, police and military vehicles, ambulances, fire trucks, hearses and vehicles transporting logistical supplies, staple goods and medicines.

Due to its number spike, a total of 59 countries banned non-essential travel to and from Indonesia, among them included Malaysia, Hungary, United Arab Emirates, South Africa, and the US as declared by the CDC. The Indonesian government persuaded other countries to bring Indonesians to their country, but the countries questioned on whether Indonesia is able to manage the outbreak and thus keep them safe. The Minister of Foreign Affairs Retno Marsudi telecommunicated with other countries to discuss it; some countries then decided to only unban very essential travel with travellers already conducted two polymerase chain reaction (PCR) tests, in consideration of Indonesia's disrupted economy.

Indonesia imposed a 14-day lockdown from 1 until 14 January 2021 after a new variant of coronavirus was detected in December 2020 and had spread to some countries. Foreigners worldwide were banned to enter the country's territories. This was later extended until 22 February.

On 26 March, the national government announced its decision to ban mudik during Eid al-Fitr from 6 to 17 May to curb the spread of COVID-19. They also tightened the travelling terms and requirements starting from 22 April to 24 May.

On 5 July, the government renewed the travelling terms and requirements during the emergency Community Activities Restrictions Enforcement. Travelers who wanted to visit Indonesia would have to perform a PCR test at least 72 hours before their departure and show their vaccination certificate. They would be tested again when they arrive in Indonesia, followed mandatory quarantine for eight days, and for those who wanted to travel domestically would have to be vaccinated with the Gotong Royong vaccine.

== Criticism ==
=== Government ===
President Jokowi was criticized in March 2020 by KADIN, Komnas HAM, and political parties such as Golkar and PKS for lack of transparency regarding information on COVID-19. Jokowi insisted on not sharing travel history details of the patients that tested positive with coronavirus in an attempt to reduce panic and uneasiness in the general public. However, this secrecy is deemed to be unlawful. Critique on transparency is also levied by the Indonesian Doctors Association regarding the number of medical personnel infected. The public had asked the government to release official national map of COVID-19 confirmed cases' location, as unofficial independent maps may provide incorrect data. Some critics of the government were arrested for allegedly spreading false information about the COVID-19 pandemic.

On 30 August 2020, President Jokowi was criticized by writer Islam Syarifur Rahman who wrote him as an antiscience president due to his statement to only rely on prayers and the ulama as a solution to prevent the COVID-19 pandemic in Indonesia.

==== Lockdown policies ====
President Jokowi came under increased pressure in the course of March to impose a partial lockdown on virus-plagued areas, with scientists saying the country is racing against time to curb the spread of COVID-19 before Eid al-Fitr and that a community quarantine could be the only solution to do exactly that. On 16 March, Jokowi said lockdown policies are the authority of the central government, and warned the local government to not impose lockdown without the consent of the central authority.

On 27 March, Indonesian health professors urged the government to do local quarantines, saying that social distancing is ineffective. The government then implemented laws to regulate requirements and procedures to enact local quarantines.

=== Failure to detect the virus ===
Health experts were concerned early on that the country was failing to identify the transmission of the virus. Harvard T. H. Chan School of Public Health professor of epidemiology Marc Lipsitch "analysed air traffic out of the Chinese city at the center of the outbreak in China and suggested in a report ... that Indonesia might have missed cases" of COVID-19. Western diplomats as well as local and international news outlets postulated that the lack of cases within Indonesia result from inadequate testing and under reporting, as opposed to sheer luck and divine intervention.

On 22 March, a research paper suggested that the official number of infections may only reflect 2% of the real COVID-19 infections in Indonesia. According to The Jakarta Post on 5 April 2020, the central government has only conducted a daily average of 240 PCR tests since 2 March.

=== Tests and treatment ===
Reports surfaced about patients in Jabodetabek having to wait for a long time to get tests or treatment for possible cases as referral hospitals face the increasing strain. University of Indonesia epidemiologist Pandu Riono said that rapid diagnostic tests as a requirement for travelling has been commercialized, capitalizing on the public's fear of the COVID-19 pandemic. According to him, RDTs are not a part of pandemic countermeasures, because it was only a serology survey to quantify how many people are infected. Critique was also expressed by Minister of Health Budi Sadikin, who said that COVID tests were misapplied, because they should have been conducted to suspected COVID cases, but instead the tests were conducted to people who just want to check themselves for journey or other purposes, so the tests are pointless.

=== Additional death rates excluded from official counts ===
According to a Reuters report, as of 28 April 2020, there were around 2,200 patients who had died with coronavirus symptoms, but not included into the official death toll of 693. This suggests that Indonesia has a higher death rate than the official counts. An analysis by Financial Times showed that there were 1,400 more deaths in Jakarta compared to the historical average number of deaths in March and April. This excess deaths figure is 15 times the official figure of 90 COVID-19 deaths in this same period.

=== Travel restrictions and evasions ===
Prohibition of mudik for all of Indonesia was enacted after the pandemic worsens. In a 21 April teleconference, Jokowi announced that the government would prohibit mudik for residents of red zones. The prohibition was effective per 24 April. The implementation would be step-by-step; sanctions for violators was effective per 7 May. Previously, mudik prohibition was only effective for civil servants, BUMN employees, and TNI-POLRI.

Initially, the government only advises people to not mudik. On 2 April, Presidential Speaker Fadjroel Rachman says that there was no official mudik prohibition for people with the caveat that pemudik must be supervised by local governments. The same was stated by ad interim Minister of Transportation Luhut Pandjaitan.

President Jokowi received criticisms for mudik regulations vagueness and decision-making slowness. Criticisms came from the Indonesian Doctors Association, YLKI, observers, and politicians as well as DPR-RI members. The prohibition is said to come too late because mudik had already started before the enaction of the prohibition. Central Java governor Ganjar Pranowo said that 600,000 people entered the region before the enactment of the prohibition. The spread of corona in several regions are linked to pemudik, especially from Jakarta as the epicenter of spread. West Java governor Ridwan Kamil said that several kabupaten in his region with COVID-19 cases were "mudik victims". In West Java alone, 253,000 has entered before the enactment of the prohibition.

On 30 March, Jokowi admitted that there has been an acceleration of mudik wave. "Since the declaration of emergency in Jakarta, there has been an acceleration of mudik wave, especially of informal workers from Jabodetabek to West Java, Central Java, East Java, and Yogyakarta," said President Jokowi on a limited meeting which was televised live. However, on a 21 April interview with Najwa Shihab, Jokowi referred to the movement of people happening before the enactment of the prohibition as pulang kampung. Mudik contributed to the spread of the virus in Indonesia, despite government regulations on social distancing and despite a lockdown slated to run until June.

Also, despite the travel restrictions which suspended all passengers to travel outside areas with at least one confirmed case, many Indonesians disregarded it and have attempted to evade the travel restrictions to return to hometown during Idul Fitri season. This caused scientists to raise concern that this evasion would lead to the diseases which can spread easily from Jakarta and nearby satellite cities, where it is the epicenter of the pandemic, to other regions of Indonesia with weak medical facilities which were arguably unable to handle large numbers of outbreak.

There were also a few attempts to evade the travel restrictions which were discovered by the police department, such as one of the cargo trucks which was stopped, in which an intermodal container was hiding a car with passengers inside, to be transported from Java to Sumatra. An additional four cargo trucks were also detained when the driver attempting to bring 20 passengers from Jakarta inside the containers which were covered with tarpaulin.

=== Lack of safety in tobacco industries ===
Despite the temporary closure of HM Sampoerna due to two workers dying from COVID-19, with additional 63 workers tested positive, Pandu Riono, the epidemiologist from University of Indonesia reported that other cigarette factories in East and West Java will continue to operate without practicing social distancing and workers never wearing face masks. This sparks concern that the cigarette factories could create new clusters for the COVID-19 pandemic considering that this industry usually has large workforce.

=== Influencer budget ===
The government faced harsh responses after announcing an IDR 72 billion budget to pay influencers to attract tourists to Indonesia. According to INDEF researcher Bhima Yudhistira, the government should have given incentives to sectors directly impacted by the pandemic, not to pay influencers to attract tourists. Besides, messages from influencers to stay home are deemed ineffective because not all people can economically do it, especially from the lower class, informal workers, and day laborers who must work outside the house to fulfill their basic needs.

== Impact ==
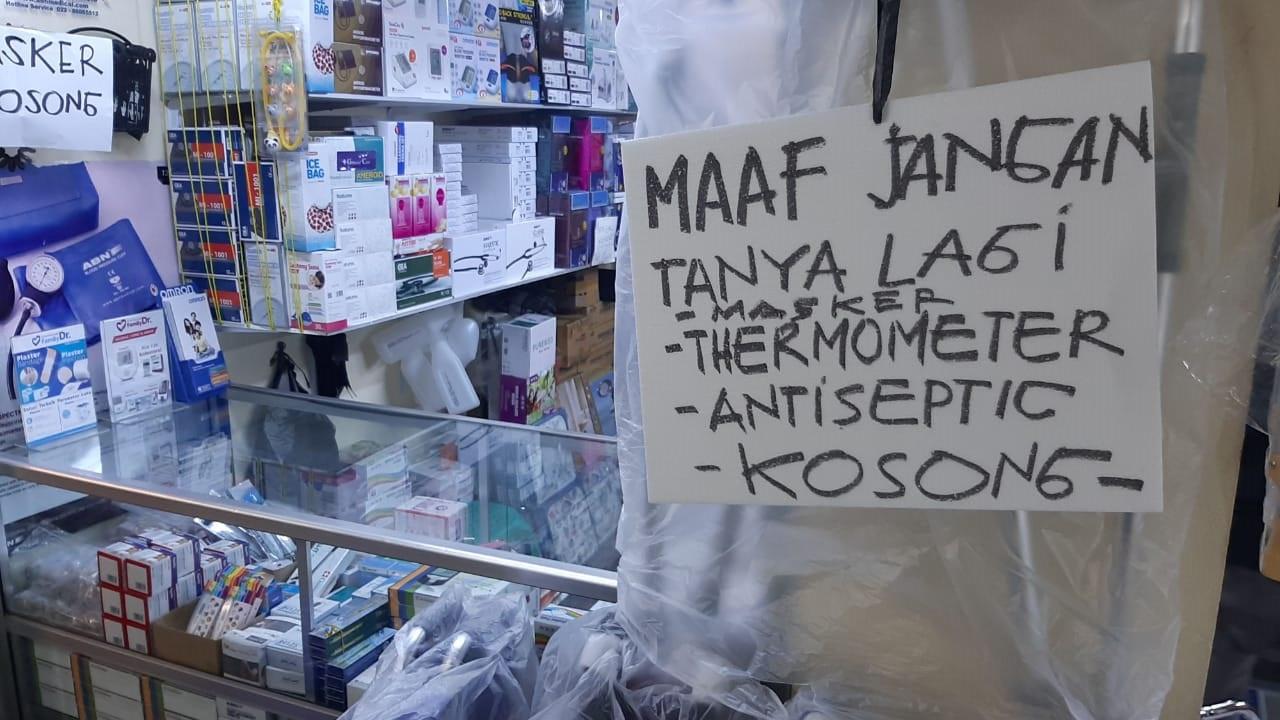
A Jakarta pharmacy in March 2020 displays a sign stating that face masks, thermometers and antiseptic handwash are out of stock.

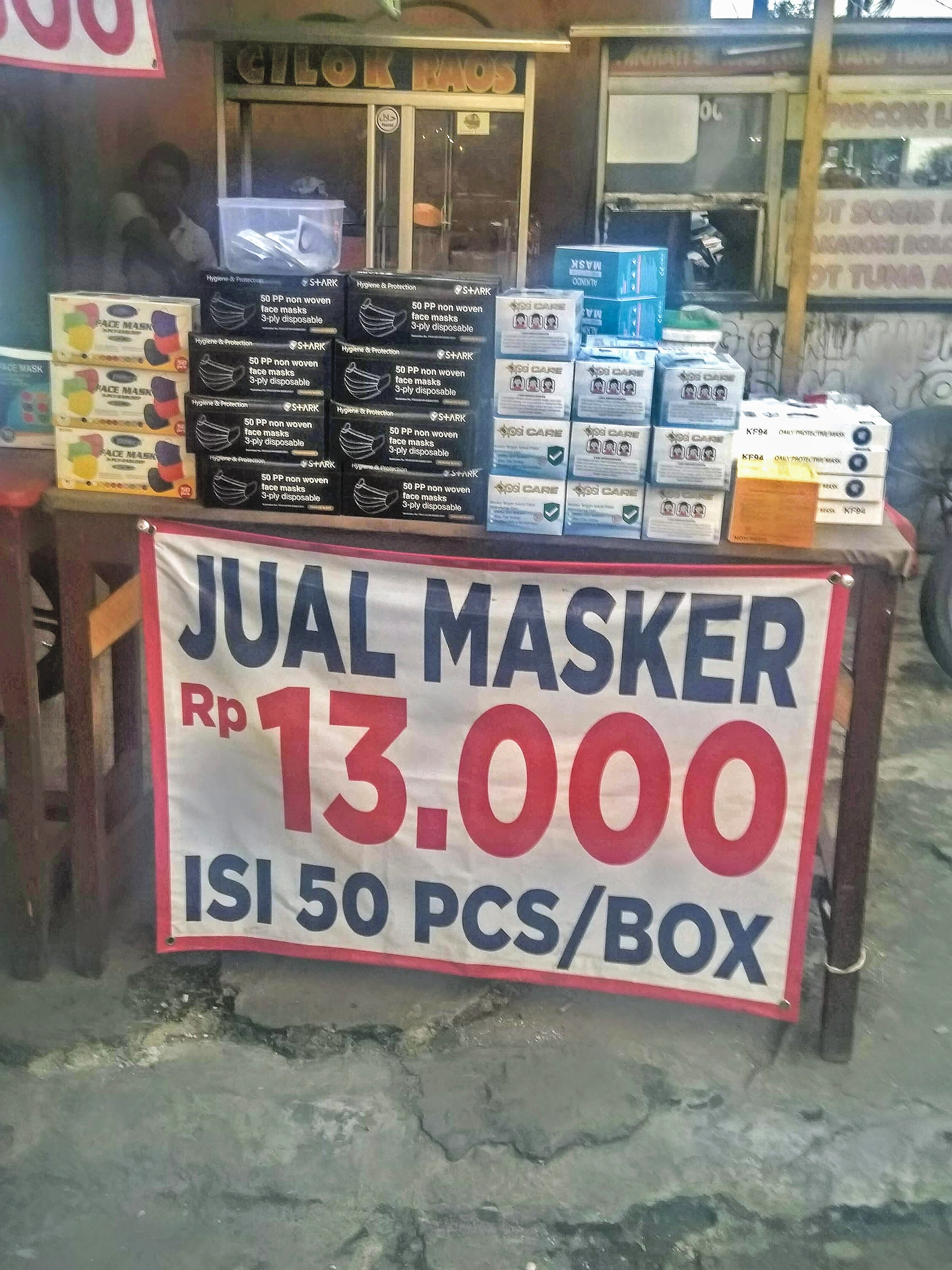
A roadside stand selling face masks at Pesanggrahan, South Jakarta.

=== Socioeconomic ===
In the first weeks of the pandemic, surgical face masks in Indonesia soared in price by over six times the original retail value from around IDR 30,000 to IDR 185,000 (some sources said it exceeded IDR 300,000) per box in some outlets after the announcement that two citizens had tested positive for coronavirus. Panic buying was reported since mid-February before the first cases were confirmed. There were also shortages of thermometers, antiseptics and hand sanitizers within a few hours after the government announces COVID-19 cases in Indonesia. President Jokowi condemned the hoarding of face masks and hand sanitizers and police started to crack down on suspected hoarders.

==== Census ====
Indonesia prepared to extend the online time for self-enumeration, and cancel all field data collection. They relied on administrative data and had requested additional UNFPA technical support for using administrative data for census.

=== Education ===
The Ministry of Education implemented remote learning starting March 2020. Research by ISEAS shows that there were education inequalities in Indonesia. 69 million students lost access to education, while students from more well-off families felt easier during the transition to remote learning. Only 40% of Indonesians have internet access.

According to the research, there are four steps that can be taken to carry out teacher-student interactions. First, using phones and internet apps. Second, teacher visits to student homes. Third, at-school assignments then to be done at home and turned in at school again. Fourth, teachers can interact indirectly to students, such as via television or radio. In some cases, students may not be studying at all.

Minimal electricity and internet access became the main problems in remote learning during the pandemic. April 2020 Ministry of Education data shows that 40,779 or 18% of grade and middle schools don't have internet access, while 7,552 or 3% of schools don't even have electricity. To address these issues, there were initiatives like radio learning, aid smartphones, and data plans, until the Ministry of Education policy to subsidize data plans starting 28 August.

=== Economic ===
Following the worldwide trend of stock price drops, the IDX Composite weakened even before the first confirmation of the disease in Indonesia. In response to expected economic slowdown due to the loss of Chinese economic activity, Bank Indonesia cut its interest rates by 25 basis points to 4.75% on 20 February. On 12 March, as the WHO declared pandemic, IDX Composite tumbled 4.2% to 4,937 when Thursday's session was opened, a level unseen in almost four years.

On 13 March, equity trading halted for the first time since 2008 over pandemic. On 19 March, IDX Composite halted because of the sharp downturn of more than 5%. This is the fourth trading halt that IDX Composite experienced during the coronavirus crisis. The four trading halts happened on 12 March at 15:33 WIB, 13 March at 9:15:33 JATS, 17 March at 15:02 JATS, and 19 March 9:37 JATS. The fifth happened on 23 March at 14:52:09 JATS. Indonesia Financial Service Authority or OJK have mandated a suspension of trading if IDX Composite fell down more than 15%.

Numbers of shopping malls started to voluntarily close due to declining foot traffic; only pharmacies, groceries and ATM still operate with limited hours.

Indonesian Finance Minister predicted that Indonesian economic growth Q2 can drop to 0% or even -2.6%, but in Q3 can recover to 1.5 to 2.8%.

Indonesia's economic growth in the first quarter of 2020 stood at 2.97%, but it is the weakest economic growth recorded since 2001. The second-quarter contraction was recorded to be 5.32%, exceeding both government and economists' predictions. Though many economists, such as Brian Tan at Barclays, Radhika Rao at DBS and Helmi Arman at Citi still expect the economy to contract in 2020. It was estimated in August that as many as 3.7 million Indonesians may have lost their jobs. The contraction was the steepest economic drop Indonesia has experienced since the Asian financial crisis.

Brian Tan, Barclays Investment Bank's regional economist, noted that private consumption, government consumption and fixed investment all fell in Q2 as social distancing measures under Indonesia's large-scale social restriction measures, or Pembatasan Sosial Berskala Besar (PSBB), have stifled economic activity. This led to a collapse in imports, which outpaced the decline in exports, he said in a report. Barclays thus slashed its 2020 GDP forecast further to a 1.3% contraction, down from 1% contraction, Mr Tan said, which is below the central bank's earlier GDP growth forecast range of 0.9 to 1.9%.

==== Decrease of income ====
The government had assessed the economic impact and decrease of income in all provinces based on low, middle, and high severity. The scenarios were communicated by President Jokowi in a meeting with governors, mayors, and regents from all of Indonesia on 24 March. The scenarios referred to economic resilience of provinces and the decrease of income of economic actors. In a middle severity scenario, the income of day laborers in West Nusa Tenggara would decrease by 25% and would only last to June–September. In the MSME sector, the greatest decrease of income would happen in North Kalimantan at 36% and would only last to August–October. For ojek and angkot drivers, the greatest decrease of income would happen in North Sumatra at 44%. For fishers and farmers, the greatest decrease of income would happen in West Kalimantan at 34% and would only last to October–November.

==== Rupiah exchange rate ====
On 17 March, the rupiah weakened to IDR 15,000 per dollar, touching a level unseen since October 2018. On 23 March, it almost touched IDR 16,000. To prevent it from touching IDR 17,000, Bank Indonesia used US$7 billion of forex reserves, so by late March the reserves were US$121 billion, decreasing US$9.4 billion from February. Bank Indonesia also bought IDR 166.2 trillion (US$10.8 billion) of government bonds sold by foreign investors. On 30 April the rupiah bounded back to IDR 15,000. On 8 June, it drastically strengthened to IDR 13,000. On 12 June, it weakened again to IDR 14,000.

=== Sports, tourism, and leisure ===
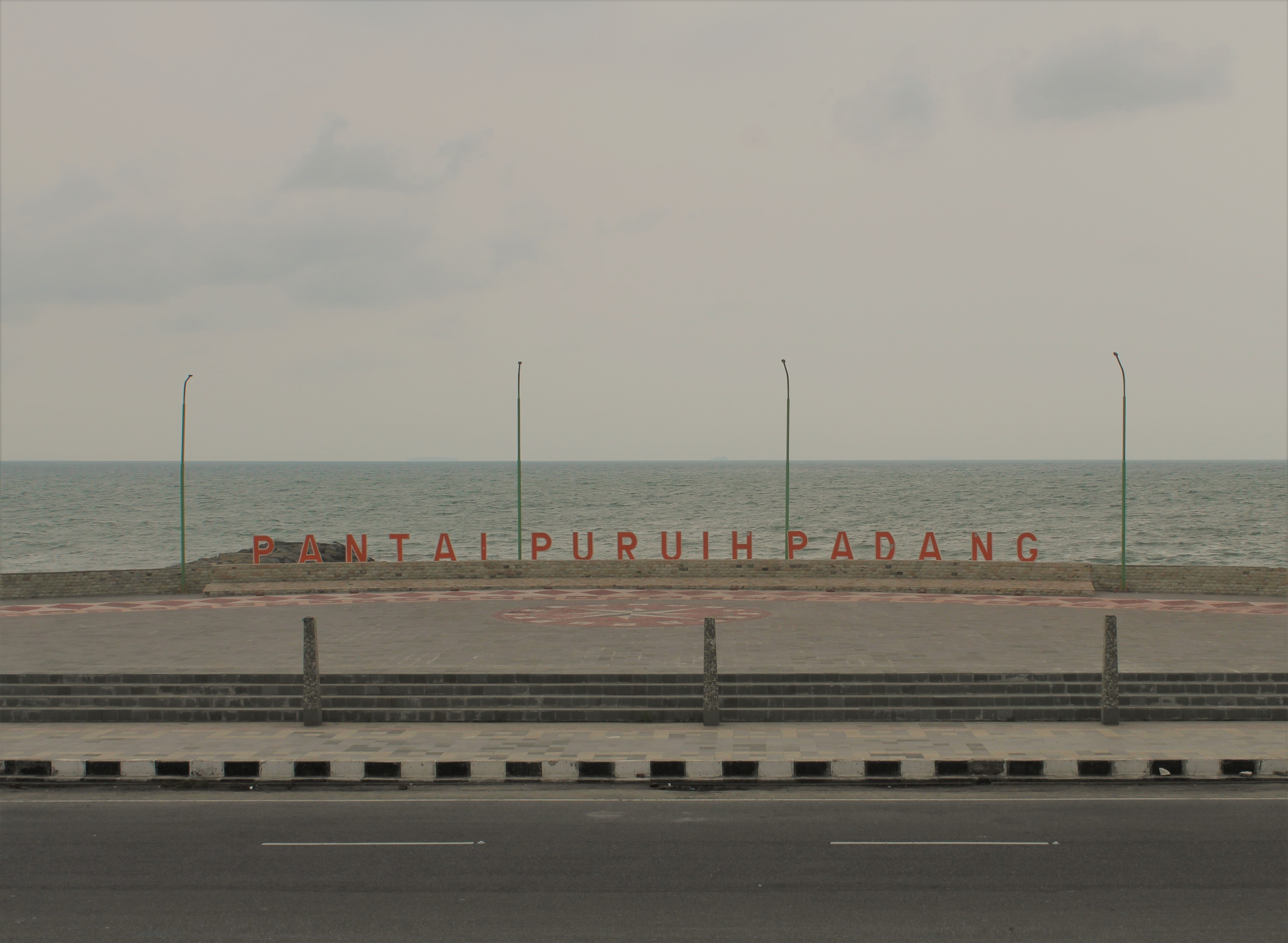
A quiet beach in Padang due to government calls of implementing social distancing.

Indonesian tourism has been severely affected. In March, overall tourist numbers fell by 64%, and Chinese tourists by 97%. Bali, where tourism accounts for 60% of GRP, had witnessed its foreign tourist arrivals fell by 93.2% in April. Hotels were taking on a meager occupancy rate, with some hotels experiencing 5% and even 0% occupancy rate due to overspecialization on Chinese visitors, increasing travel restrictions from source countries, and an overall fear of the virus. There was, however, an increase in interest for domestic tourism, and Chinese tourists which had already been on the island generally opted to extend their stay. All beaches in Bali were temporarily closed for the public.

The 2020 edition of the National Sports Week (PON) in Papua, which was initially slated for October, has been postponed until next year. Jakarta ePrix race of the 2019–20 Formula E season would also be postponed due to coronavirus concerns, then later cancelled after the rescheduling calendar involving Berlin ePrix for the season-ending triple header. The city's Capital Investment and One-Stop Service (PM-PTSP) announced that it plans to postpone any public events with mass-gatherings from March to April following the news of an increasing number of COVID-19 cases to 27.

Numerous music events such as by Rich Brian, Hammersonic Festival, Dream Theater, Babymetal, Slipknot, ONE OK ROCK, and electronic dance music festival "We Are Connected" have been suspended in the country.

Several films, such as Tersanjung the Movie, Generasi 90an: Melankolia, and KKN di Desa Penari have been delayed, also because of the pandemic; the latter has been postponed for the second time due to the Omicron variant.

The government through the Ministry of Education and Culture Directorate-General of Culture launched Apresiasi Pelaku Budaya, which targeted cultural actors with certain criteria who were impacted by the pandemic. By 8 June, the program accommodated 29,781 cultural actors with 266,606 works of art under 11 themes.

The 2020 Indonesia International Motor Show was postponed due to the pandemic, then later cancelled.

The 2020 edition of both the Indonesia Open and Indonesia Masters Super 100 were cancelled due to the pandemic.

Starting on 19 December 2020, Bali required its domestic visitors who would travel by air during the Christmas and New Year holiday to perform a PCR test, or an antigen test if they are entering by land or sea. Due to the sudden regulation, 133,000 would-be visitors asked for plane ticket refund, with losses estimated at 317 billion IDR.

The 2021 FIFA U-20 World Cup, which would have been hosted in Indonesia on 20 May-12 June 2021, was cancelled by FIFA on 24 December. Despite the cancellation, Indonesia was awarded the right to host the subsequent FIFA U-20 World Cup instead.

== Transition to endemic stage ==
On 18 May 2022, the Governor of Bali, I Wayan Koster, requested that Bali receive an endemic status to COVID-19 in order to "accelerate the recovery of Bali's tourism and economy".

On 20 September 2022, it was reported that the country of Indonesia is "...posed to reach COVID-19 endemic stage".

On 30 December 2022, the government revoked large-scale social restrictions and lifted the restrictions in all regions in the country.

On 21 June 2023, President Joko Widodo officially announced the revocation of the COVID-19 pandemic status in Indonesia. With this revocation, Indonesia will enter an endemic period.

On 5 August 2023, President Joko Widodo officially ended the handling of the COVID-19 pandemic in Indonesia. Jokowi also disbanded the Committee for Handling COVID-19 and National Economic Recovery or KPC PEN.

== Referral and examiner laboratories ==
On 16 March, Minister of Health Terawan Agus Putranto officially signed the Minister of Health Decree HK.01.07MENKES/187/2020 which designated 1 national COVID-19 referral laboratory and 12 COVID-19 examiner laboratories. The Ministry of Health Research and Development Agency Laboratory was designated as the referral laboratory and while the other 12 laboratories are designated according to their locations throughout Indonesia.

As the national COVID-19 referral laboratory, the Agency Laboratory had the authority to confirm samples of COVID-19 patients obtained from the 12 examiner laboratories, to be forwarded to the Directorate General of Disease Prevention and Control and the Directorate General of Health Service. The testing process is free of charge. However, to be able to take the test, one must fulfill the following criteria with referral from related public health facilities:

- had come in direct contact with someone tested positive for COVID-19
- within the last 14 days has traveled to infected countries before the appearance of symptoms
- experiencing fever above 38 °C with other symptoms such as coughing, flu, muscle sores, shortness of breath, or mild to severe pneumonia.

The 12 examiner laboratories are:

- Jakarta Office of Health Laboratory, covering Maluku, North Maluku, West Sumatra, North Sumatra, and Aceh.
- Palembang Office of Health laboratory, covering Bengkulu, Bangka-Belitung, South Sumatra, Jambi, and Lampung.
- Makassar Office of Health Laboratory, covering Gorontalo, North Sulawesi, West Sulawesi, Southeast Sulawesi, and South Sulawesi.
- Surabaya Office of Health Laboratory, covering South Kalimantan, Central Kalimantan, East Kalimantan, and North Kalimantan.
- Papua Office of Health Laboratory, covering Papua and West Papua.
- Jakarta Technical Office of Environmental Health and Disease Control, covering Riau, Riau Islands, West Java, West Kalimantan, and Banten.
- Surabaya Technical Office of Environmental Health and Disease Control, covering East Java, Bali, West Nusa Tenggara, and East Nusa Tenggara.
- Yogyakarta Technical Office of Environmental Heath and Disease Control, covering Yogyakarta and Central Java.
- Jakarta Regional Health Laboratory, covering DKI Jakarta.
- Eijkman Instituut, covering DKI Jakarta.
- University of Indonesia Faculty of Medicine, covering RSUPN Dr. Cipto Mangunkusumo and RS Universitas Indonesia.
- University of Airlangga Faculty of Medicine, covering RSUD Dr. Soetomo and RS Universitas Airlangga.

== Notable deaths ==
Below is the list of prominent Indonesians who died from COVID-19:

- Abdul Gafur, ex Minister of Youth and Sports
- Adang Sudrajat, member of the People's Representative Council
- Adi Darma, ex mayor of Bontang
- Ahmad Djuhara, architect
- Alex Hesegem, ex vice governor of Papua
- Ali Jaber, preacher (Note: Died during the recovery or healing process.)
- Ali Taher, member of the People's Representative Council
- Amris, vice mayor of Dumai
- Anicetus Bongsu Antonius Sinaga, bishop
- Aptripel Tumimomor, regent of North Morowali
- Aria Baron, guitarist
- Arief Harsono, businessman
- Aswin Efendi Siregar, ex vice regent of South Tapanuli
- Bahrum Daido, ex vice regent of Luwu
- Bambang Suryadi, member of the People's Representative Council
- Bens Leo, journalist
- Burhan Abdurahman, ex mayor of Ternate
- Clara Eunike, member of Shojo Complex
- Dadang Hawari, psychiatrist
- Dadang Wigiarto, regent of Situbondo
- Dani Anwar, member of Regional Representative Council
- Dorce Gamalama, singer, actress, and comedian
- Dudu Duswara, justice of the Supreme Court
- Edward Antony, vice regent of Way Kanan
- Edy Oglek, comedian
- Eka Supria Atmaja, regent of Bekasi
- Eliaser Yentji Sunur, regent of Lembata
- Enny Sri Hartati, economist
- Farida Pasha, actress
- Ferdy Nico Yohannes Piay, Indonesia's vice ambassador for India
- Frans Volva, esports commentator
- Fuad Alkhar, actor and comedian
- Gatot Sudjito, member of the People's Representative Council
- Gusli Topan Sabara, vice regent of Konawe
- Gusur Adhikarya, writer
- Harmoko, ex Minister of Information
- Hasyim Afandi, ex regent of Temanggung
- Ibnu Saleh, inactive regent of Central Bangka
- Imam Suroso, member of the People's Representative Council
- Jalaludin Rakhmat, member of the People's Representative Council
- Jane Shalimar, actress
- Jimmy Demianus Ijie, member of the People's Representative Council
- John Siffy Mirin, member of the People's Representative Council
- Juliadi, mayor-elect of Binjai
- Junaedi Salat, actor
- Koes Hendratmo, singer
- Kuryana Azis, regent of Ogan Komering Ulu
- Lukman Niode, swimming athlete
- Mahyuddin N. S., ex governor of South Sumatra
- Malkan Amin, candidate for regent of Barru
- Manteb Soedharsono, puppeteer
- Masriadi Martunus, ex regent of Tanah Datar
- Masud Yunus, mayor of Mojokerto
- Mochammad Soufis Subri, vice mayor of Probolinggo
- Mohamad Assegaf, lawyer
- Muhammad Amin, ex vice governor of West Nusa Tenggara
- Muharram, regent of Berau
- Muladi, ex Minister of Justice
- Muslihan Diding Sutrisno, ex regent of North Bengkulu
- Muspandi, member of Regional People's Representative Council
- Naek L. Tobing, physician, sexologist, and writer
- Nadjmi Adhani, mayor of Banjarbaru
- Nasrul Abit, ex vice governor of West Sumatra
- Neneng Anjarwati, singer
- Nur Achmad Syaifuddin, acting regent of Sidoarjo
- Nur Supriyanto, member of Regional People's Representative Council
- Pollycarpus Budihari Priyanto, murderer of Munir Said Thalib
- Rachmawati Sukarnoputri, politician and daughter of Sukarno
- Raditya Oloan Panggabean, pastor and influencer
- Raja'e, vice regent of Pamekasan
- Rina Gunawan, actress
- Ronggur Sihombing, film director
- Rossalis Rusman Adenan, Indonesia's ambassador for Sudan
- Saefullah, regional secretary of Jakarta
- Sugiharto, ex Minister of State Owned Enterprises
- Soepriyatno, member of the People's Representative Council
- Soraya Abdullah, actress
- Steven Nugraha, singer and vocalist of Steven & Coconut Treez
- Subiakto Tjakrawerdaya, ex Minister of Cooperatives and Small Business
- Sudjati, regent of Bulungan
- Syahrul, mayor of Tanjungpinang
- Syamsuddin Mahmud, ex governor of Aceh
- Tasiman, ex regent of Pati
- Tengku Zulkarnain, cleric
- Thohari Aziz, vice mayor of Balikpapan
- Umbu Landu Paranggi, poet
- Wikan Satriati, writer
- Yasin Payapo, regent of West Seram
- Yopie Latul, singer
