= Sudjati =

Indonesian politician (1954–2020)

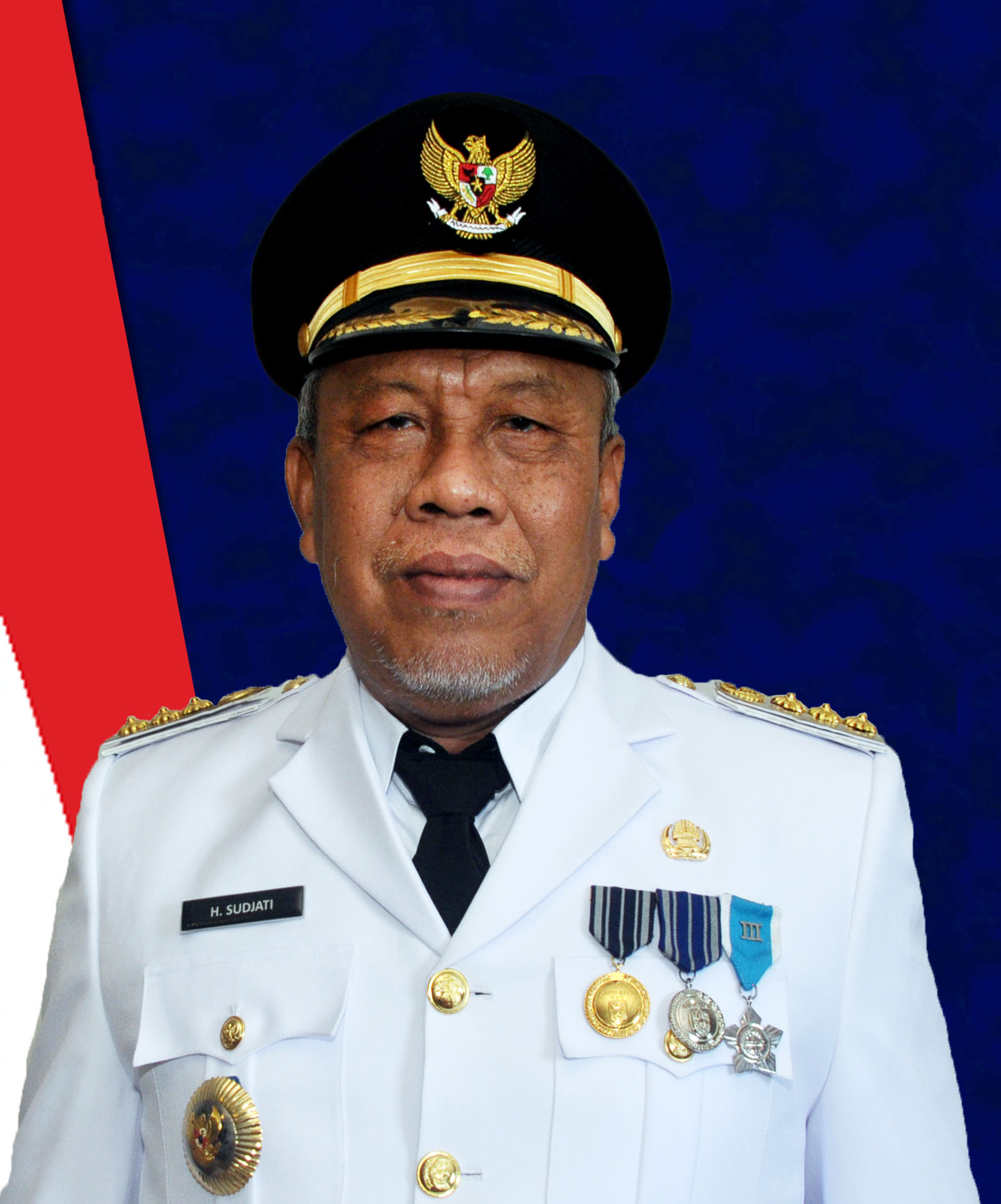

Regent of Bulungan Regency
- In office 17 February 2016 – 8 December 2020
- Governor: Irianto Lambrie
- Vice Governor: Ingkong Ala (as Vice Regent)
- Preceded by: Budiman Arifin; Syaiful Herman (acting)
- Succeeded by: Ingkong Ala (acting)

Personal details
- Born: March 13, 1954 Semarang, Central Java, Indonesia
- Died: December 8, 2020 (aged 66) Tanjung Selor, North Kalimantan, Indonesia
- Spouse: Titien Iriany
- Children: Two
- Education: Islamic University of Indonesia

Sudjati (13 March 1954 – 8 December 2020) was an Indonesian politician.

== Career ==
He served as Regent of Bulungan Regency, in North Kalimantan, from February 2016 until his death in office in December 2020 during the COVID-19 pandemic in Indonesia.

== Death ==
Regent Sudjati was diagnosed with COVID-19 and self-quarantined at home before being hospitalized. He died from COVID-19 at Tanjung Selor Regional General Hospital (RSUD) in Tanjung Selor on 8 December 2020, during the COVID-19 pandemic in Indonesia at the age of 66.
