= Umbu Landu Paranggi =

Indonesian artist (1943–2021)

- Born: Umbu Wulang Landu Paranggi; 10 August 1943; Kananggar, East Sumba, East Nusa Tenggara, Dutch East Indies
- Died: 6 April 2021 (aged 77); Sanur, Bali, Indonesia
- Occupations: Poet, writer
- Writing career
- Language: Indonesian

Umbu Wulang Landu Paranggi (10 August 1943 – 6 April 2021) was an Indonesian poet who is often referred to as a mysterious figure in the world of Indonesian literature since the 1960s.

== Biography ==
His name is known through his works in the form of essays and poems published in various mass media. Umbu was a poet and tutor for young poets and artists in the 1970s, such as Emha Ainun Nadjib, Eko Tunas, Linus Suryadi AG, and Ebiet G. Ade.

In 2020, he received the Bali Jani Nugraha award from the Bali Jani Festival in literature.

Umbu died of COVID-19 on 6 April 2021, during the COVID-19 pandemic in Indonesia.
