= Dudu Duswara =

Indonesian judge (c.1951–2020)

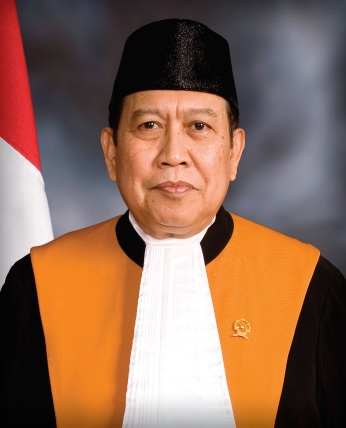
Duswara

Dudu Duswara Machmudin (c. 1951 – 10 December 2020) was an Indonesian judge, lawyer, and academic.

== Biography ==
He served as a justice of the Supreme Court of Indonesia from 2011 until his death from COVID-19 on 10 December 2020, during the COVID-19 pandemic in Indonesia.

In January 2020, he became a law professor at Langlangbuana University. He also held lectures on the role of the Supreme Court in appeals cases within the Indonesian justice system.

Duswara received his bachelor's degree from Langlangbuana University in Bandung. He then completed both his master's degree and doctorate at Padjadjaran University.

Prior to joining the Supreme Court in 2011, Duswara oversaw corruption trials in the Central Jakarta District Court. In 2014, Justice Duswara made national headlines when he sentenced Herman Jumat Masan, a former pastor from Maumere, Flores, East Nusa Tenggara, to death for the murder of his girlfriend and both of their children. Duswara's ruling overturned Jumat Masan's earlier sentences of life in prison, which had been handed down by the Maumere District Court and the Kupang High Courts in East Nusa Tenggara.

Duswara died from COVID-19 during the COVID-19 pandemic in Indonesia at Sentosa Asih Hospital in Bandung, West Java, on December 10, 2020, at the age of 69.
