= Ibnu Saleh =

Indonesian politician (1961–2020)

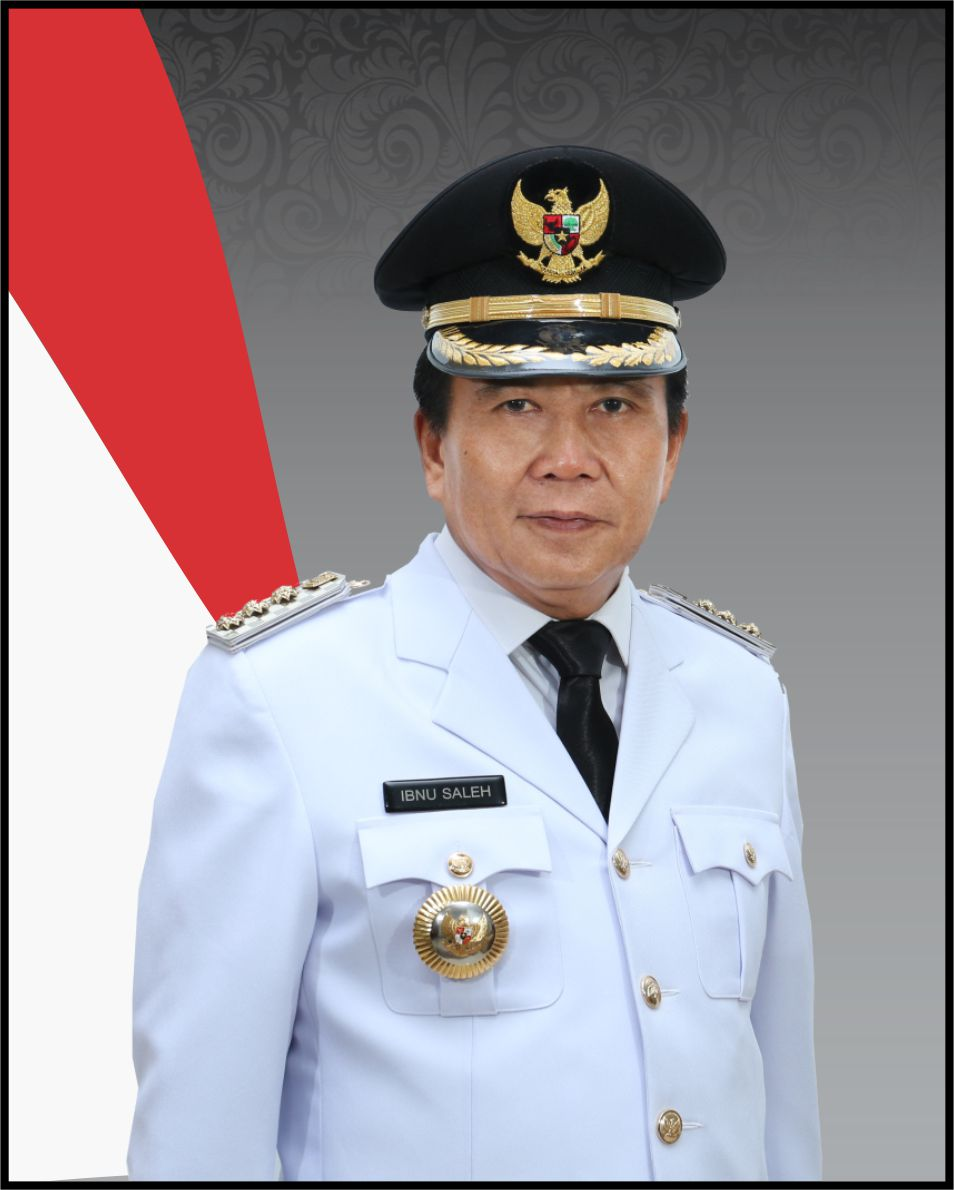
Saleh in 2019

Ibnu Saleh (Prabumulih, 8 October 1961 – Pangkal Pinang, 4 October 2020) was an Indonesian politician, member of the NasDem Party. Between 2016 and 2017, he was Deputy Regent of the Central Bangka Regency, and Regent from 2017 till his death in office during the COVID-19 pandemic in Indonesia.

== Biography ==
Saleh graduated at the Faculty of Agriculture of the Lampung University and later obtained a master in Marketing Management at IBEK Jakarta and another in Governmental Science at the Institute of Domestic Government.

During his political career, he served as Chairman of the Central Bangka Regency NasDem Party; Chairman of the Indonesian Youth Council, Bangka Belitung Islands Province; Chairman of the KNPI, Bangka Belitung Islands Province; Deputy Chairman of the Organization Division of the Province of Bangka Belitung's KONI; Deputy Chairman of Central Bangka KONI; Chairman of IPPI Province, Kep. Bangka Belitung Province; Chairman of the HKTI Pangkalpinang City; Chairman of the Indonesian Youth Council, Pangkapinang City; Chairman of the Pangkalpinang City KNPI; Chairman of the Supervisory Board of the FKPPI Pangkapinang City; Chairman of the FKPPI Pangkapinang City; Chairman of the Pangkalpinang Military Command Mosque Youth Association; Head of Public Relations Division of ISBA Lampung Branch; Head of Pangkapinang City Agricultural Information and Extension Center; Head of the Pangkalpinang City Agriculture and Food Crops Service; Head of the Agriculture and Forestry Service Office of Central Bangka Regency; and Regional Secretary of Central Bangka. From 17 February 2016 to 12 May 2017 he was Deputy Regent of Central Bangka, and from 27 July 2017 he was Regent of Central Bangka.

Saleh died on 4 October 2020 at a hospital in Pangkal Pinang, Indonesia from COVID-19, four days before his 59th birthday.
