= Statistics of the COVID-19 pandemic in Indonesia =

This article presents the official statistics collected during the COVID-19 pandemic in Indonesia.

== Cumulative numbers ==
Total confirmed cases Active cases Total deaths Total recoveries

== Vaccination ==
Vaccination numbers may not be accurate due to different calculations, cut-off times, and sources from the government. Lower daily inoculations may be recorded on Sundays and public holidays.

View source data.

=== By group ===
Vaccination numbers by group
Group	Target	First dose		Second dose		Third dose		Fourth dose	
Group	Target	Total	Percentage	Total	Percentage	Total	Percentage	Total	Percentage
Health professionals	1,468,764	2,049,957	139.57%	2,012,511	137.02%	1,812,332	123.39%	837,536	57.02%
Public officers	17,327,167	18,309,328	105.67%	17,086,258	98.61%	9,789,865	56.5%	53,736	0.31%
Elderlies (Note: Elderlies are defined as anyone ages 60 or above.)	21,553,118	18,325,455	85.02%	15,230,265	70.66%	7,273,762	33.75%	460,636	2.14%
Susceptible and general public (Note: Mostly include people age 18 to 59.)	141,211,181	117,153,978	82.96%	99,712,043	70.61%	48,462,995	34.32%	232,496	0.16%
Teenagers (Note: Teenagers are defined as anyone ages 12 to 17.)	26,705,490	25,537,029	95.62%	22,335,685	83.64%	1,535,957	5.75%	0	0%
Children (Note: Children are defined as anyone ages 6 to 11.)	26,400,300	21,712,250	82.24%	17,631,373	66.78%	1,714	0.01%	0	0%
Private vaccinations (Note: Also known as the Gotong Royong vaccination program. Through this program, the government would seek help from private sectors and would be paid by the companies instead of individually.)	N/A	1,178,658	N/A	1,123,758	N/A	720,849	N/A	760	N/A
Total	234,666,020	204,266,655	87.05%	175,131,893	74.63%	69,597,474	29.66%	1,585,164	0.68%
Data as of 5 February 2023, 20:51 WIB

=== By province ===
Vaccination numbers by province
Province	Target	First dose		Percentage of population with at least one dose (Note: The population data is from Statistics Indonesia's census in 2020.)	Second dose		Percentage of population fully vaccinated (Note: Fully vaccinated people are those who have been vaccinated twice (except for the Janssen vaccine). The second dose would be inoculated 14 to 84 days after the first dose.)	Third dose		Percentage of population with one booster shot (Note: The first booster shot or the third dose would be given six months after the second dose.)	Fourth dose		Percentage of population with two booster shots
Province	Target	Total	Percentage	Percentage of population with at least one dose	Total	Percentage	Percentage of population fully vaccinated	Total	Percentage	Percentage of population with one booster shot	Total	Percentage	Percentage of population with two booster shots
Aceh	4,028,891	4,150,756	103.02%	78.69%	3,397,749	84.33%	64.41%	1,382,857	34.32%	26.22%	22,274	0.55%	0.42%
Bali	3,405,130	3,971,583	116.64%	91.99%	3,689,316	108.35%	85.45%	2,155,172	63.29%	49.92%	59,900	1.76%	1.39%
Bangka Belitung Islands	1,137,824	1,122,594	98.66%	77.12%	974,868	85.68%	66.97%	355,707	31.26%	24.44%	6,077	0.53%	0.42%
Banten	9,229,383	8,827,755	95.65%	74.15%	7,287,665	78.96%	61.22%	3,017,852	32.7%	25.35%	39,312	0.43%	0.33%
Bengkulu	1,553,792	1,487,479	95.73%	73.98%	1,223,056	78.71%	60.83%	425,345	27.37%	21.15%	5,322	0.34%	0.26%
Central Java	28,727,805	27,045,338	94.14%	74.06%	24,216,747	84.3%	66.32%	8,566,987	29.82%	23.46%	170,334	0.59%	0.47%
Central Kalimantan	2,036,104	2,047,842	100.58%	76.7%	1,757,857	86.33%	65.84%	638,971	31.38%	23.93%	14,931	0.73%	0.56%
Central Sulawesi	2,135,907	1,897,508	88.84%	63.55%	1,321,473	61.87%	44.26%	355,029	16.62%	11.89%	5,345	0.25%	0.18%
East Java	31,826,206	30,268,177	95.1%	74.43%	26,397,764	82.94%	64.91%	9,253,657	29.08%	22.76%	242,035	0.76%	0.6%
East Kalimantan	2,874,401	2,971,223	103.37%	78.9%	2,643,762	91.98%	70.2%	1,190,641	41.42%	31.62%	22,220	0.77%	0.59%
East Nusa Tenggara	3,831,439	3,685,830	96.2%	69.21%	2,872,928	74.98%	53.95%	649,004	16.94%	12.19%	10,068	0.26%	0.19%
Gorontalo	938,409	874,784	93.22%	74.66%	665,657	70.93%	56.81%	181,478	19.34%	15.49%	4,021	0.43%	0.34%
Jakarta	8,395,427	12,636,915	150.52%	119.64%	10,927,844	130.16%	103.46%	5,343,543	63.65%	50.59%	161,013	1.92%	1.52%
Jambi	2,686,193	2,661,502	99.08%	75.01%	2,159,681	80.4%	60.87%	733,376	27.3%	20.67%	7,881	0.29%	0.22%
Lampung	10,860,987	6,123,896	56.38%	67.98%	5,033,571	46.35%	55.88%	1,632,986	15.04%	18.13%	18,559	0.17%	0.21%
Maluku	1,417,690	1,084,347	76.49%	58.65%	722,990	51%	39.1%	222,588	15.7%	12.04%	2,327	0.16%	0.13%
North Kalimantan	545,672	532,580	97.6%	75.89%	452,611	82.95%	64.49%	169,649	31.09%	24.17%	4,575	0.84%	0.65%
North Maluku	954,092	862,900	90.44%	67.26%	636,971	66.76%	49.65%	199,729	20.93%	15.57%	1,223	0.13%	0.1%
North Sulawesi	2,080,685	1,894,101	91.03%	72.24%	1,456,262	69.99%	55.54%	482,874	23.21%	18.42%	9,180	0.44%	0.35%
North Sumatra	11,419,559	11,199,413	98.07%	75.67%	9,877,165	86.49%	66.74%	4,228,126	37.03%	28.57%	51,347	0.45%	0.35%
Papua	2,583,771	891,364	34.5%	20.71%	688,195	26.64%	15.99%	237,127	9.18%	5.51%	3,329	0.13%	0.08%
Riau	4,840,347	4,882,950	100.88%	76.37%	4,023,545	83.13%	62.93%	1,422,122	29.38%	22.24%	14,406	0.3%	0.23%
Riau Islands	1,581,035	1,780,420	112.61%	86.24%	1,561,140	98.74%	75.62%	776,217	49.1%	37.6%	9,250	0.59%	0.45%
South Kalimantan	3,161,137	3,043,871	96.29%	74.72%	2,477,685	78.38%	60.82%	879,783	27.83%	21.6%	16,948	0.54%	0.42%
South Sulawesi	7,058,141	6,426,083	91.04%	70.82%	4,918,735	69.69%	54.21%	1,294,481	18.34%	14.27%	20,092	0.28%	0.22%
South Sumatra	6,303,096	6,098,326	96.75%	72.02%	4,980,974	79.02%	58.83%	1,446,159	22.94%	17.08%	28,640	0.45%	0.34%
Southeast Sulawesi	2,002,579	1,801,258	89.95%	68.62%	1,339,911	66.91%	51.05%	345,373	17.25%	13.16%	6,425	0.32%	0.24%
Special Region of Yogyakarta	2,879,699	3,244,558	112.67%	88.44%	3,045,814	105.77%	83.02%	1,317,278	45.74%	35.91%	40,297	1.4%	1.1%
West Java	37,907,814	36,771,791	97%	76.17%	32,551,678	85.87%	67.43%	15,666,091	41.33%	32.45%	151,382	0.4%	0.31%
West Kalimantan	3,872,477	3,518,987	90.87%	64.99%	2,921,532	75.44%	53.96%	801,233	20.69%	14.8%	17,034	0.44%	0.31%
West Nusa Tenggara	3,910,638	3,906,192	99.89%	73.42%	3,458,624	88.44%	65.01%	1,450,319	37.09%	27.26%	15,063	0.39%	0.28%
West Papua	797,402	518,789	65.06%	45.75%	387,718	48.62%	34.19%	148,442	18.62%	13.09%	931	0.12%	0.08%
West Sulawesi	1,089,240	878,399	80.64%	61.89%	621,402	57.05%	43.78%	133,873	12.29%	9.43%	1,563	0.14%	0.11%
West Sumatra	4,408,509	4,172,697	94.65%	75.39%	3,348,937	75.97%	60.51%	1,109,362	25.16%	20.04%	10,185	0.23%	0.18%
Total	234,666,020	204,080,880	86.97%	75.53%	174,854,075	74.51%	64.71%	68,771,161	29.31%	25.45%	1,193,489	0.51%	0.44%
Data as of 8 January 2023, 17:25 WIB

== Demography ==
=== By genders ===
Genders	Cases	Recoveries	Deaths
♂ Male	47.6%	47.4%	52.5%
♀ Female	52.4%	52.6%	47.5%

=== By ages ===
Ages	Cases	Recoveries	Deaths
0-5	3.1%	3.2%	0.6%
6-18	10.7%	10.9%	0.6%
19-30	26.6%	27.2%	3.1%
31-45	28.8%	29.3%	12.7%
46-59	19.9%	19.5%	35.4%
≥60	11.0%	10.0%	47.6%

== Others ==
=== Foreigners in Indonesia ===
As of 27 January 2022, at least 6,190 foreigners were tested positive for COVID-19 in Indonesia, of which 5,840 recovered, 32 died, and 413 had returned to their respective countries or territories.

=== Indonesians abroad ===
Confirmed cases of Indonesian nationals abroad
Country or territory	Cases	Recoveries	Deaths	Active
Afghanistan	24	24	0	0
Albania	3	3	0	0
Algeria	12	12	0	0
Antigua and Barbuda	1	0	0	1
Argentina	14	13	0	1
Australia	21	11	0	10
Austria	3	2	0	1
Azerbaijan	23	20	0	3
Bahrain	152	142	8	2
Bangladesh	16	14	0	2
Belgium	23	22	0	1
Bolivia	1	1	0	0
Bosnia and Herzegovina	25	21	0	4
Brunei	650	643	7	0
Bulgaria	27	27	0	0
Cambodia	23	19	4	0
Canada	12	7	0	5
Chile	6	6	0	0
China	2	1	0	1
Colombia	13	12	0	1
Croatia	1	0	0	1
Cuba	3	1	2	0
Cyprus	3	3	0	0
Czech Republic	54	45	0	9
Denmark	225	225	0	0
East Timor	11	0	0	11
Ecuador	3	2	0	1
Egypt	107	100	7	0
Ethiopia	18	17	0	1
Finland	108	102	0	6
France	157	157	0	0
Germany	139	132	5	2
Ghana	1	0	1	0
Greece	18	16	1	1
Guinea	85	82	1	2
Guinea-Bissau	3	3	0	0
Guyana	10	10	0	0
Hong Kong	366	364	0	2
Hungary	88	78	0	10
India	227	223	4	0
Iran	19	16	1	2
Iraq	22	14	8	0
Ireland	11	11	0	0
Italy	54	50	0	4
Ivory Coast	4	4	0	0
Japan	62	30	0	32
Jordan	72	69	3	0
Kazakhstan	29	19	0	10
Kuwait	352	338	14	0
Kyrgyzstan	5	4	1	0
Lebanon	1	0	0	1
Libya	6	4	2	0
Lithuania	2	2	0	0
Macau	3	3	0	0
Madagascar	19	18	1	0
Malaysia	168	52	2	114
Maldives	27	25	1	1
Mali	3	3	0	0
Malta	1	1	0	0
Mauritius	7	7	0	0
Mexico	5	5	0	0
Morocco	2	0	0	2
Mozambique	4	4	0	0
Myanmar	24	24	0	0
Namibia	27	27	0	0
Netherlands	166	124	5	37
New Caledonia	3	2	0	1
Nigeria	7	5	0	2
North Macedonia	2	2	0	0
Norway	42	42	0	0
Oman	20	2	0	18
Pakistan	59	58	1	0
Panama	7	7	0	0
Papua New Guinea	38	37	1	0
Peru	42	39	3	0
Philippines	39	33	1	5
Poland	45	36	0	9
Portugal	51	49	1	1
Qatar	863	853	4	6
Romania	45	42	1	2
Russia	40	38	0	2
Saudi Arabia	270	89	101	80
Senegal	19	18	1	0
Serbia	4	3	0	1
Seychelles	2	0	2	0
Singapore	831	802	2	27
Slovenia	2	2	0	0
South Africa	7	1	1	5
South Korea	606	605	1	0
Spain	95	91	1	3
Sri Lanka	5	4	0	1
Sudan	22	21	1	0
Suriname	70	67	2	1
Sweden	37	0	0	37
Switzerland	16	9	0	7
Syria	65	64	1	0
Taiwan	419	149	0	270
Thailand	114	100	1	13
The Bahamas	1	1	0	0
The Gambia	3	3	0	0
Tunisia	14	0	0	14
Turkey	135	123	7	5
United Arab Emirates	267	227	31	9
United Kingdom	601	594	7	0
United States	259	225	29	5
Uzbekistan	34	32	1	1
Vatican City	72	61	0	11
Venezuela	1	0	0	1
Vietnam	51	51	0	0
Cruise ships (Note: Occurred on international waters.)	246	234	12	0
Total	9,344	8,235	291	818
Data as of 25 May 2022, 08:00 WIB (UTC+7)
