= Dadang Wigiarto =

Indonesian politician (1966–2020)

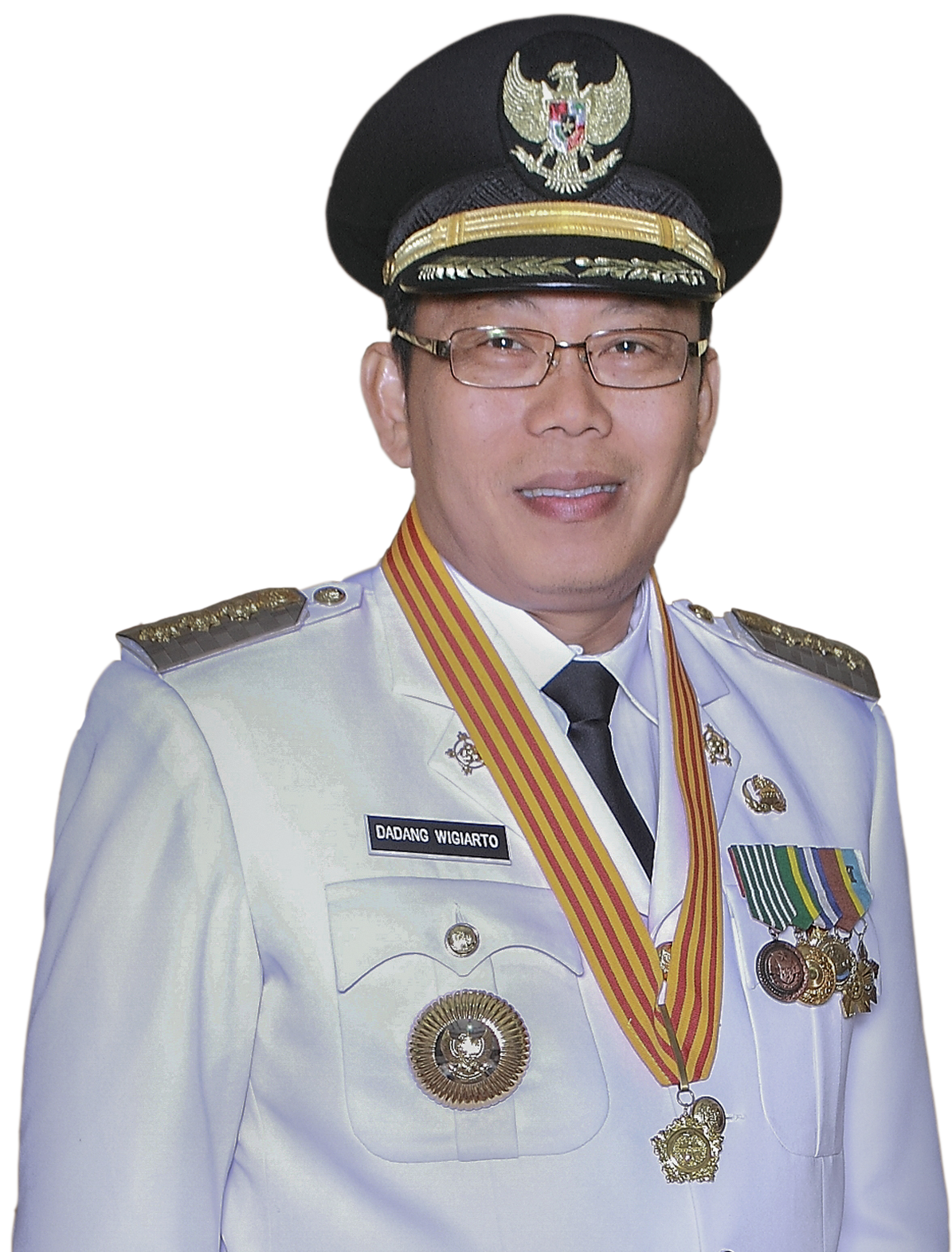

Regent of Situbondo Regency
- In office 17 February 2016 – 26 November 2020
- Preceded by: Zainal Muhtadien
- Succeeded by: Muhammad Ramadhan

Personal details
- Born: December 20, 1966 Indonesia Pasuruan
- Died: November 26, 2020 (aged 53) Indonesia Situbondo
- Cause of death: COVID-19
- Party: National Awakening Party
- Spouse: Ummi Kulsum Dadang Wigiarto

Dadang Wigiarto (Pasuruan, 20 December 1966 – Situbondo, 26 November 2020) was an Indonesian politician, member of the National Awakening Party.

== Biography ==
He served as Regent of Situbondo from 2010 until his death in office in 2020.

He served as Chairman of the Ulema National Awakening Party in the Situbondo Regional People's Representative Council.

He was elected as Regent of Situbondo in 2010 and re-elected in the 2015 Indonesian local elections. During his tenure, Situbondo Regency won the Adipura trophy (awarded to cities in Indonesia that are successful in cleaning and managing the urban environment) three times; additionally, he proclaimed a car free day on Sundays on the main road in Situbondo City. His order to civil servants to hold Dhuhur prayers in congregation raised controversy.

During the COVID-19 pandemic in Indonesia, Dadang was hospitalized in Situbondo for COVID and died on 26 November 2020, at age 53.
