= Muharram (politician) =

Indonesian politician (1968–2020)

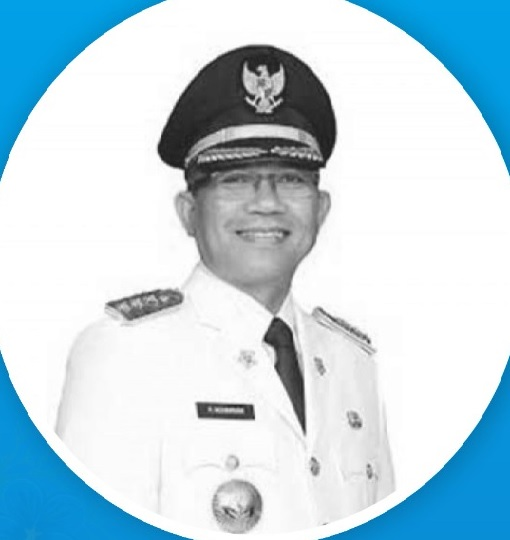

Regent of Berau Regency
- In office 17 February 2016 – 22 September 2020
- Preceded by: Makmur HAPK
- Succeeded by: Muhammad Ramadhan

Personal details
- Born: 7 February 1968 Teluk Semanting, Indonesia
- Died: 22 September 2020 (aged 52) Balikpapan, Indonesia
- Party: Prosperous Justice Party
- Spouse: Sri Juniarsih

Muharram (Teluk Semanting, 7 February 1968 – Balikpapan, 22 September 2020) was an Indonesian politician, member of the Prosperous Justice Party. He served as Regent of Berau from 2016 until his death in office in 2020.

He was elected in the 2015 Indonesian local elections and took office on 17 February 2016, when he was officially inaugurated by Governor of East Kalimantan Awang Faroek Ishak along with his deputy, Agus Tamtomo.

He died of COVID-19 on 22 September 2020, at Pertamina Hospital in Balikpapan, during the pandemic in Indonesia, after being hospitalized for thirteen days.
