= Kemayoran Athletes Village =

- Interactive map of the Kemayoran Athletes Village area

General information
- Status: In use
- Type: Accommodation
- Architectural style: International Modern
- Location: Jalan HBR Motik, Kemayoran District, Central Jakarta, Jakarta, Indonesia
- Coordinates: 6.1523773°S 106.8594821°E
- Construction started: March 2016
- Completed: December 2017
- Owner: Government of Indonesia

Design and construction
- Main contractor: PT. Wijaya Karya and PT. Brantas Abipraya

Kemayoran Athletes Village (Indonesian: Wisma Atlet Kemayoran) is a building complex located in Kemayoran District, Jakarta, Indonesia. The site was developed as the athlete's village for the 2018 Asian Games and 2018 Asian Para Games which was held in Jakarta, built on an area of 10 hectares land, which had 7,424 apartments in 10 towers. Total accommodation capacity of 22,272 at the village exceeded International Olympic Committee standards, which require Olympics hosts to provide rooms for at least 14,000 athletes.

== Use as COVID-19 hospital ==
Kemayoran Athletes Village Emergency Hospital

Geography
- Location: Jakarta, Indonesia

Organisation
- Type: Specialist, temporary

Services
- Beds: 3,000

History
- Founded: 23 March 2020
- Closed: 31 March 2023

Links
- Lists: Hospitals in Indonesia

During the COVID-19 pandemic in Indonesia, 4 towers were converted to emergency field hospitals. On 18 March 2020, the Ministry of Finance announced Kemayoran Athletes Village will be converted to house COVID-19 patients who show only mild symptoms after consultation from doctors. The conversion was officially completed on 23 March.

With the 30 December 2022 government announcement on revocation of the Community Activities Restrictions Enforcement, 3 towers of the emergency hospital were decommissioned, leaving only one tower active.
