= Nadjmi Adhani =

Indonesian politician (1969–2020)

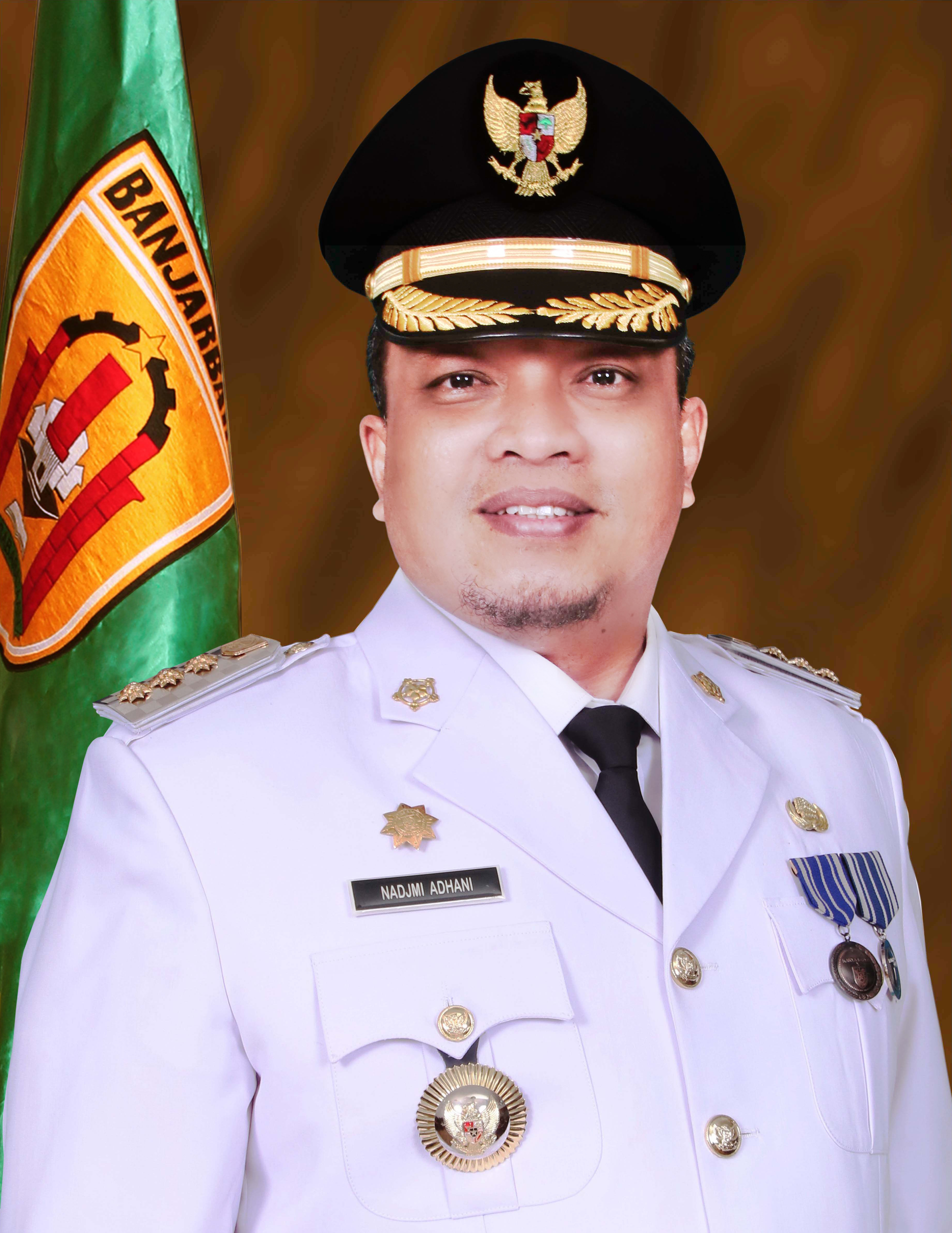

Mayor of Banjarbaru
- In office 17 February 2016 – 10 August 2020
- Deputy: Darmawan Jaya Setiawan
- Preceded by: Ruzaidin Noor; Martinus (acting)
- Succeeded by: Darmawan Jaya Setiawan (acting)

Personal details
- Born: September 27, 1969 Banjarbaru, South Kalimantan, Indonesia
- Died: August 10, 2020 (aged 50) Banjarbaru, South Kalimantan, Indonesia
- Party: Great Indonesia Movement Party
- Spouse: Ririn Kartika Rini
- Education: Diponegoro University; Gadjah Mada University

Nadjmi Adhani (27 September 1969 – 10 August 2020) was an Indonesian politician and civil servant.

== Biography ==
He served as the mayor of Banjarbaru, a major city in South Kalimantan, from February 2016 until his death in office in August 2020 during the COVID-19 pandemic in Indonesia.

In contrast to some Indonesian officials, Adhani reacted strongly to the 2020 COVID-19 pandemic. He was one of the first mayors in Indonesia to enact penalties for those ignoring COVID-19 safety protocols, such as wearing a facemask. Notably, he initially required violators to do push-ups as punishment, before transitioning to less controversial monetary fines.

Mayor Adhani tested positive for COVID-19 on 27 July 2020. That same day, Adhani released a 2-minute video posted to Instagram warning Banjarbaru's residents to take the COVID-19 seriously. His wife, Ririn Kartika Rini, also tested positive for COVID-19. Both were isolated in Ulin Regional General Hospital. Adhani announced that deputy mayor Darmawan Jaya Setiawan would oversee the city's administration during his treatment.

Mayor Nadjmi Adhani died from complications of COVID-19 at Ulin Regional General Hospital in Banjarbaru at 2:30 A.M. on 10 August 2020, after two weeks in isolation. He was 50 years old.
