= Muslihan DS =

Indonesian politician (1946–2020)

Muslihan Diding Sutrisno (4 August 1946 – 6 December 2020) was an Indonesian army officer and politician.

== Career ==
Born in Bengkulu, Indonesia, he was a member of the People's Conscience Party. DS served as the Regent of Rejang Lebong Regency from 1994 to 1999 and Regent of North Bengkulu Regency from 2001 until 2006. He also served in the Bengkulu Regional People's Representative Council from 2009 until 2014.

At the time of his death, Diding Sutrisno was running for Vice Governor of Bengkulu as the running mate of Bengkulu gubernatorial candidate, Helmi Hasan. The gubernatorial election was held on 9 December 2020, just three days after his death.

== Death ==
Muslihan DS died from COVID-19 in Bengkulu on 6 December 2020, at the age of 74 during the COVID-19 pandemic in Indonesia.
