= Corona Rintawan =

Indonesian emergency medicine physician

- Born: 1 January 1975 (age 51); Surabaya, East Java, Indonesia
- Education: University of Brawijaya
- Occupation: Emergency physician

Corona Rintawan (born 1 January 1975) is an Indonesian physician specializing in emergency medicine. Active in the field since 2003, he has led the NGO Muhammadiyah's medical response team in multiple disasters, most recently the COVID-19 pandemic.

== Early life ==
Corona was born in Surabaya, East Java on 1 January 1975, as the third child of four siblings. Corona's name originated from the Toyota Corona, which was a popular car in Indonesia in 1975. Corona is a graduate of the Faculty of Medicine at the University of Brawijaya. In 2018, he earned a specialist degree in emergency medicine.

== Career ==
Corona joined Muhammadiyah-affiliated medical organizations in 2006, and as of 2020 he practices medicine at the Muhammadiyah hospital in Lamongan, East Java.

=== Emergency medicine ===
Corona's work in emergency medicine began in 2003, when he was deployed to Aceh, and he also worked in the area following the 2004 tsunami.

In 2013, Corona was deployed to the Philippines as part of an aid team in the aftermath of Typhoon Haiyan, and he headed Muhammadiyah's medical response team (Muhammadiyah Disaster Management Center/MDMC) to the April 2015 Nepal earthquake. During the Rohingya refugee crisis in 2017, Corona was appointed to lead Muhammadiyah's team of 50 medical practitioners ("Muhammadiyah Aid") to Cox's Bazar, itself under a larger group of Indonesian aid to the refugees of which Corona was coordinator. The aid team encountered a diphtheria outbreak in the refugee camps.

=== COVID-19 pandemic ===
Upon the outbreak of COVID-19 in Indonesia, Muhammadiyah formed an emergency command center and appointed Corona as its chief, allocating 20 hospitals in Java and Sumatra to handle the disease backed by some 30,000 philanthropic locations operated by the organization in Indonesia. Corona prepared two programs to handle the outbreak: one through raising awareness of potential risk factors, which included spreading the awareness of the need for self-isolation. The other program was aimed at motivating those who had hoarded face masks to donate them to others.

Corona publicly stated his concern about people using chloroquine for self-medication, touted by both Indonesian President Joko Widodo and American President Donald Trump as a potential cure for COVID-19, and getting drug poisoning. In April, he was enlisted by the Indonesian National Board for Disaster Management (BNPB) as a special staff, resulting in him being replaced at the head of Muhammadiyah's response team. Later on, he criticized government policy to open up restrictions as putting economy over public health.

=== Post-COVID ===
In 2023, Corona was deployed to an Indonesian field hospital in Hassa, Hatay, Turkey following the 2023 Turkey–Syria earthquake. He was deputy head of the Indonesian Emergency Medical Team.
