= Bahrum Daido =

Indonesian politician (1964–2021)

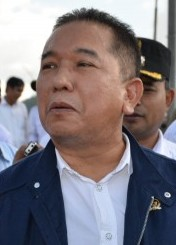

Member of People's Representative Council
- In office October 2009 – October 2019
- Constituency: South Sulawesi III (North Toraja, Tana Toraja, Sidrap, Pinrang, Enrekang, Luwu, North Luwu, East Luwu, and Palopo)

Personal details
- Born: 30 September 1964 Palopo, South Sulawesi, Indonesia
- Died: 2 January 2021 (aged 56) Jakarta, Indonesia
- Party: Democrat Party
- Occupation: Politician

Bahrum Daido (30 September 1964 – 2 January 2021) was an Indonesian politician who served as member of parliament for period 2009–2019.

Daido was member of Democrat Party and in 2004, he was elected together with Basmin Mattayang to become Regent and vice-regent of Luwu. In 2008, he became regent replacing Mattayang until 2009. After he served as Regent of Luwu, he was elected as MP and elected again in 2014. In 2019, he was not elected for the third time.

Daido died from COVID-19 on 2 January 2021, during the COVID-19 pandemic in Indonesia.
