= Soraya Abdullah =

Indonesian actress (1978–2021)

- Born: 3 August 1978; Jakarta, Indonesia
- Died: 1 February 2021 (aged 42); Tangerang Regency, Indonesia
- Occupation: Actress

Soraya Abdullah (3 August 1978 – 1 February 2021) was an Indonesian actress.

Abdullah died from COVID-19 on 1 February 2021, during the COVID-19 pandemic in Indonesia.

== Filmography ==
=== Cinema ===
- Tato (1997)

=== Soap Operas ===
- Kerinduan (1997)
- Air Mata Terakhir (1997)
- Terpikat (1999)
- Jangan Ucapkan Cinta (1999–2000)
- Gerhana II (1999–2003)
- Wajah Perempuan (2000)
- Kehormatan (2000–2004)
- Romantika (2001)
- Tersanjung 6 (2001–2005)
- Lilin Kecil (2002)
- Si Bajaj (2004–2005)
- Hidayah (2005)
- Misteri Ilahi
