= Dadang Hawari =

Indonesian physician (1940–2020)

- Born: 16 June 1940; Residency of Pekalongan, Dutch East Indies
- Died: 3 December 2020 (aged 80); Jakarta, Indonesia
- Occupation(s): Physician, psychiatrist, and author
- Known for: his ability to combine a medical approach with a religious approach within an Islamic framework

Dadang Hawari (16 June 1940 – 3 December 2020) was an Indonesian psychiatrist.

== Biography ==
He was well known for his ability to combine a medical approach with a religious approach within an Islamic framework.

Hawari died from COVID-19 on 3 December 2020, at the age of 80, amid the COVID-19 pandemic in Indonesia.
