= Muspandi =

Indonesian politician (1975–2021)

Muspandi (22 April 1975 – 1 January 2021) was an Indonesian politician, businessman and member of the National Mandate Party (PAN). He served as a member of the East Kalimantan Regional People's Representative Council from 2014 until his death in office in 2021 from COVID-19 during the COVID-19 pandemic in Indonesia.

== Life and career ==
Muspandi was born in Long Kali district, Paser Regency, East Kalimantan, on April 22, 1975.

He began his political career as the treasurer of the local Long Kali chapter of National Mandate Party (PAN) from 2007 to 2010. Muspandi was elected to the Paser Regency DPRD, or regency council, in 2009, where he served one term from 2009 until 2014. He simultaneously held the position of Secretary of the PAN party in Pasar from 2010 to 2015. Outside of politics, Muspandi was involved in palm oil plantations in East Kalimantan.

In 2014, Muspandi was elected to the provincial East Kalimantan Regional People's Representative Council (East Kalimantan DPRD). He served his first term in the DPRD from 2014 to 2019 and won re-election to a second term in the 2019 East Kalimantan provincial election. During his second term, Muspandi was chairman of the DPRD's Regional Regulatory Establishment Agency. His second term was due to last from 2019 to 2024, but he died in office from COVID-19 on January 1, 2021.

=== Death ===
Muspandi died from COVID-19 at Abdul Wahab Sjahranie Hospital in Samarinda, East Kalimantan, Indonesia, on January 1, 2021, at the age of 45. Muspandi, who suffered from asthma, had been hospitalized since December 22, 2020, for COVID-19 treatment. He was survived by his wife, Wiwin Andriani, and their two children.
