= Nur Supriyanto =

Indonesian politician (1965–2020)

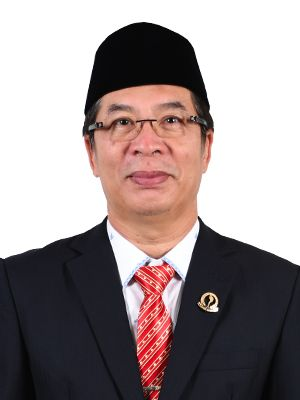

Member of 15th West Java Regional People's Representative Council
- In office October 2019 – November 2020
- Constituency: West Java VIII (Depok and Bekasi)

Personal details
- Born: 8 April 1965 Tegal, Central Java, Indonesia
- Died: 27 November 2020 (aged 55) Bekasi, West Java, Indonesia
- Party: Prosperous Justice Party
- Occupation: Politician

Nur Supriyanto (8 April 1965 – 27 November 2020) was an Indonesian politician.

== Biography ==
He was elected to the West Java Regional People's Representative Council in 2004, 2009, 2014, and 2019. Supriyanto also became deputy speaker for 2009–2014 term.

He died on 27 November 2020, due to COVID-19 in Bekasi.
