= Imam Suroso =

Indonesian politician (1964–2020)

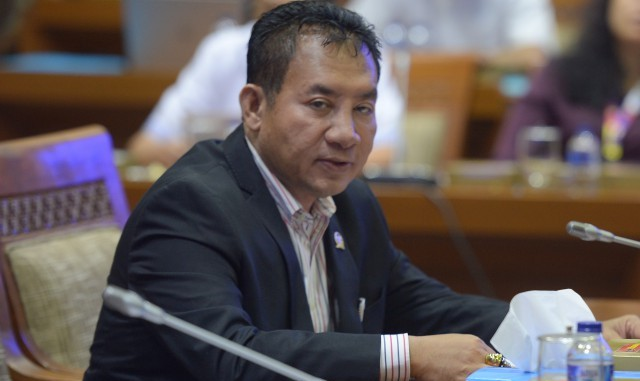

Member of DPR RI Fraction PDIP
- In office 1 October 2009 – 27 March 2020
- President: Susilo Bambang Yudhoyono; Joko Widodo

Personal details
- Born: 10 January 1964 Pati, Central Java, Indonesia
- Died: 27 March 2020 (aged 56) Semarang, Central Java, Indonesia
- Cause of death: COVID-19
- Party: Partai Demokrasi Indonesia Perjuangan
- Spouse: Suhartini or Jeng Asih
- Education: Universitas Bojonegoro; Universitas Bung Karno
- Occupation: Politician; Purnawirawan Polri; Humanist; Paranormal

Military service
- Allegiance: Indonesia
- Branch/service: 30px Kepolisian Negara Republik Indonesia
- Years of service: 1987—2009

Imam Suroso (10 January 1964 – 27 March 2020) was an Indonesian politician who served as a member of the House of Representatives for three periods, 2009–2014, 2014–2019 and 2019–2020.

== Biography ==
Imam was born in Pati, Central Java, precisely on 10 January 1964. After graduating from the SMA Nasional, Pati, he was accepted as a member of the Indonesian National Police, after few months of training at the Watukosek Pusdikpol, Sidoarjo, East Java. He began his career as a member of the Indonesian National Police, after completing the Prospective Bintara School (Secaba) in 1987 and continuing the Candidate Officer School (Secapa) in 2004.

Shortly thereafter, he married and has three daughters. When he was assigned as Bripdapol, he served in Pati Police Station. Imam was interested in the world of mysticism, exploring world of paranormal, earning the nickname of "Mbah Roso".

To make a living, he worked part-time as a security of Kembangjoyo Restaurant, Pati. In the 1996s, Imam Suroso worked concurrently, as a police, paranormal, and as a "security".

=== Educational history ===
- SD Negeri Puri I Pati (1972–1978)
- SMP Muhammadiyah Pati (1978–1981)
- SMA Nasional Pati, natural science major. (1981–1984)
- Faculty of Social and Political Science, Universitas Bojonegoro (1993–1998)
- Law, Bung Karno University (2009–2012)
- Management, STM IMMI (2000–2003)

== Death ==
On 21 March 2020, after visiting Pasar Baru to inform the locals about the risks of COVID-19, Imam started experiencing a fever and sore throat. He asked to be tested for COVID-19 and the test was carried out on the same day; he, his family and members of his staff were required to self-isolate for 14 days. On 22 March, his daughter reported that he had increasingly severe cough; on the following night, Imam was hospitalized at Karyadi Hospital in Semarang. On 24 March, three of the staff members who had accompanied him to Pasar Baru also started to experience fever, sore throat and cough. On 25 March, it was reported that Imam was suffering from pneumonia, and on the following day, that preparations were made to place him on a ventilator as his oxygen saturation levels had fallen to 80-81 percent. On 27 March, he died at the hospital. Melki Lana Lena, deputy chairman of the IX DPR Commission, confirmed that Imam's cause of death was COVID-19.
