= Vogel (surname) =

Vogel and De Vogel are surnames originating in German and Dutch-speaking countries. An alternate spelling is Fogel. Vogel is the German and Dutch word for "bird". Equivalent surnames are Bird or Byrd in English or L'Oiseau in French. Notable people with the surname include:

== Academics ==
- Arthur Vogel (chemist) (1905–1966), British chemist
- Betsy Vogel Boze (born 1953), American academic and higher education administrator
- Cornelia Johanna de Vogel (1905–1986), Dutch classicist, philosopher and theologian
- Dan Vogel (born 1955), historian of Mormonism
- David Vogel (professor) (born 1949), American political scientist
- Detlef Vogel (born 1942), German historian
- Eduard Vogel (1829–1856), German astronomer and explorer in Central Africa
- Ezra Vogel (1930–2020), American Japanologist and author
- Friedrich Vogel (human geneticist) (1925–2006), German human geneticist
- Hans Vogel (scientist) (1900–1980), German helminthologist
- Hermann Carl Vogel (1841–1907), German astronomer
- Hermann Wilhelm Vogel (1834–1898), German photochemist and photographer
- J. Ph. Vogel (1871–1958), Dutch Sanskritist and epigraphist
- Johann Carl Vogel (1932–2012), South African physicist
- Johannes Vogel (botanist) (born 1963), German botanist
- Jörg Vogel (born 1967), German biologist
- Joseph Vogel (author) (born 1981), American popular culture critic
- Julius Rudolph Theodor Vogel (1812–1841), German botanist
- Klaus Vogel (1930–2007), German legal scholar
- Kurt Vogel (historian) (1888–1985), German historian of mathematics
- Louis Vogel (born 1954), French jurist, professor, and politician
- Marcel Vogel (1917–1991), American inventor and esotericist
- Michelle Vogel (born 1972), Australian-born film historian, author and editor
- Orville Vogel (1907–1991), American biologist
- Stefanie N. Vogel (born 1951), American physician-scientist, microbiologist, and immunologist
- Steven K. Vogel (born 1961), American political scientist, son of Ezra
- Steven Vogel (1940–2015), American biomechanics researcher
- Thomas Vogel (historian) (born 1959), German military historian
- Wolfgang Vogel (mathematician) (1940–1996), German mathematician

== Arts ==
=== Poetry ===
- Johann Vogel (1589–1663), German poet

=== Music ===
- Allan Vogel (born 1944), American oboist
- Cristian Vogel (born 1972), British experimental electronic musician
- Edith Vogel (1912–1992), Austro-Hungarian classical pianist active in the UK
- Eric Vogel (1896–1980), Czech jazz trumpeter
- Harald Vogel (born 1941), German organist and author
- Janet Vogel (1941–1980), American pop singer
- Jaroslav Vogel (1894–1970), Czech conductor
- Jason Vogel (born 1968), American Rap Recording Engineer
- Johann Vogel (composer) (1756–1788), German composer
- Karsten Vogel (born 1943), Danish composer
- Lars Vogel (born 1982), Dutch metal musician and known as Lars NachtBraecker in Heidevolk
- Roger Craig Vogel (born 1947), American composer
- Sam Vogel (born 1993), American DJ and music producer known as Jauz
- Scott Vogel (born 1973), American rock singer
- Seja Vogel (born 1981), German-Australian singer-songwriter
- Siegfried Vogel (born 1937), German operatic bass
- Tyson Vogel (born 1981), American rock musician
- Vic Vogel (1935–2019), Canadian jazz musician
- Winston Dan Vogel (born 1943), Israeli-born American conductor
- Wladimir Vogel (1896–1984), Russian-born Swiss composer

=== Performing arts ===
- Albert Vogel (1874–1933), Dutch officer, teacher and performer
- Amos Vogel (1921–2012), Austrian-born American film critic
- Darlene Vogel (born 1962), American actress
- Ellen Vogel (1922–2015), Dutch television, film and stage actress
- Franz Vogel (1883–1956), German film producer
- Frederic B. Vogel (1925–2005), American theater producer and actor
- Friedemann Vogel (born 1979), German ballet dancer
- Henry Vogel (1863–1925), American actor and bass-baritone singer
- Jürgen Vogel (born 1968), German actor, screenwriter and film producer
- Matt Vogel (puppeteer) (born 1970), American puppeteer
- Mike Vogel (born 1979), American actor
- Mitch Vogel (born 1956), American actor
- Nicolas Vogel (1925–2006), French actor and comedian
- Nikolas Vogel (1932–1991), Austrian-German film actor and camera man
- Paul C. Vogel (1899–1975), American cinematographer
- Paula Vogel (born 1951), American playwright
- Peter Vogel (actor) (1937–1978), German film actor
- Rudolf Vogel (1900–1967), German film and television actor
- Tony Vogel (1942–2015), English actor
- Virgil W. Vogel (1919–1996), American television and film director

=== Visual arts ===
- Arthur Vogel (photographer) (1868–1962), German merchant, photographer and publisher
- Bernhard Vogel (engraver) (1683–1737), German engraver
- Carl Christian Vogel von Vogelstein (1788–1868), German painter
- Christa Frieda Vogel (born 1960), German photographer
- Christian Leberecht Vogel (1759–1816), German painter, draughtsman and writer on art
- Dorothy Vogel (born 1935), American art collector
- Franck Vogel (born 1977), French photojournalist and documentary film director
- Herbert Vogel (1922–2012), American art collector
- Hermann Vogel (French illustrator) (1856–1918), German-born French painter
- Hermann Vogel (German illustrator) (1854–1921), German illustrator
- Hugo Vogel (1855–1934), German painter
- Johannes Gijsbert Vogel (1828–1915), Dutch landscape painter
- Kate Vogel (born 1958), American studio glass artist
- Lillie Lewisohn Vogel (1876–1976), American art collector, philanthropist, and socialite
- Ludwig Vogel (1788–1879), Swiss painter
- Peter Vogel (artist) (1937–2017), German sound artist
- Speed Vogel (1918–2008), American sculptor and painter
- Zygmunt Vogel (1764–1826), Polish illustrator and painter

== Business ==
- August H. Vogel (1862–1930), American businessman
- Frederick Vogel (1823–1892), German-born American tanner and businessman
- Jeff Vogel (born 1970), American video game developer and entrepreneur
- John W. Vogel (1863–1951), American white minstrel-show entrepreneur
- Joseph Vogel (executive) (1895–1969), American executive, president of MGM
- Paul Bernard Vogel (1899–1972), Swiss industrialist

== Military ==
- Clayton Barney Vogel (1882–1964), American Marine Corps general
- Eduard Vogel von Falckenstein (1797–1885), Prussian general
- Emil Vogel (1894–1985), German World War II general
- Kurt Vogel (German officer) (1889–1967), German military officer

== Politics and law ==
- Bernhard Vogel (1932–2025), German Minister President of Rhineland-Palatinate and Thuringia
- Bob Vogel (politician) (born 1951), American politician from Minnesota
- Bruce Vogel (born 1958), American politician from Minnesota
- Carl M. Vogel (1955–2016), American politician from Missouri
- Charles Joseph Vogel (1898–1980), American judge
- Elder Vogel (born 1956), American politician from Pennsylvania
- Frank A. Vogel (1888–1951), American politician and banker from North Dakota
- Friedrich Vogel (politician) (1929–2005), German politician
- Georg Wilhelm Vogel (1743–1813), German jurist and mayor of Jena
- Hans Vogel (1881–1945), German politician
- Hans-Jochen Vogel (1926–2020), German politician
- Hugo E. Vogel (1888–1974), American politician from Wisconsin
- Hunter Vogel (1903–1990), Canadian politician from British Columbia
- Jill Vogel (born 1970), American politician and lawyer from Virginia
- Joe Vogel (politician) (born 1997), American politician from Maryland
- Johannes Vogel (born 1982), German politician
- Julius Vogel (1835–1899), New Zealand politician and Prime Minister
- Karl Vogel (1884–1959), American politician from Nebraska
- Mel Vogel (1848–?), German-American politician from California
- Robert Vogel (judge) (1918–2005), American judge from North Dakota (son of Frank A. Vogel)
- Rudolf Vogel (1906–1991), German politician
- Otto A. Vogel (1886–1951), American politician from WIsconsin
- Sarah Vogel (born 1946), American politician and lawyer from North Dakota (granddaughter of Frank A. Vogel)
- Steffen Vogel (born 1974), German politician
- Volkmar Vogel (born 1959), German politician
- William Vogel (1931–2019), Canadian politician from British Columbia
- Wolfgang Vogel (1925–2008), German lawyer

== Religion ==
- Arthur A. Vogel (1924–2012), American Episcopal bishop
- Catherine Vogel (c. 1460–1539), Polish Jewish martyr
- Cyril John Vogel (1905–1979), American Roman Catholic prelate
- Hansjörg Vogel (born 1951), Swiss theologian
- Pierre Vogel (born 1978), German Islamist preacher and boxer

== Sports ==
- Bob Vogel (born 1941), American football player
- Daniel Vogel (born 1991), Mexican footballer
- Eberhard Vogel (born 1943), German footballer
- Fabian Vogel (born 1995), German trampoline gymnast
- Florian Vogel (cyclist) (born 1982), Swiss racing cyclist
- Florian Vogel (swimmer) (born 1994), German swimmer
- Frank Vogel (born 1973), American professional basketball coach
- Gary Vogel (born 1956), American soccer defender
- Heiko Vogel (born 1975), German football manager
- Joe Vogel (basketball) (born 1973), American-Lebanese basketball player
- Johann Vogel (born 1977), Swiss football midfielder
- Julius de Vogel (1828–1915), Dutch chess master
- Justin Vogel (born 1993), American football punter
- Kristina Vogel (born 1990), German track cyclist
- Markus Vogel (born 1984), Swiss alpine ski racer
- Marvin Vogel (born 1985), Zimbabwean cricketer
- Matt Vogel (swimmer) (born 1957), American swimmer
- Nick Vogel (born 1990), American volleyball player
- Otto Vogel (1899–1969), American baseball player
- Peter Vogel (cyclist) (1939–2021), Swiss cyclist
- Peter Vogel (footballer) (born 1952), German footballer
- Pia Vogel (born 1969), Swiss rower
- Rémy Vogel (1960–2016), French football defender
- Renate Vogel (born 1955), East German swimmer
- Richard Vogel (tennis) (born 1964), Czech tennis player
- Robert Vogel (marksman) (born 1981), American sport shooter
- Sam Vogel (boxer) (1902–?), American Olympic boxer
- Sigfrido Vogel (1912–?), Argentine sports shooter
- Sydne Vogel (born 1979), American figure skater
- Ted Vogel (1925–2019), American marathon runner
- Thomas Vogel (born 1965), German football coach and player
- Thomas Vogel (born 1967), German footballer
- Timothy Vogel (born 1960), New Zealand cricketer
- Turia Vogel (born 1969), Cook Islands windsurfer
- Wouter de Vogel (born 1990), Dutch footballer

== Writing ==
- Alfred Vogel (1902–1996), Swiss herbalist and writer
- Bruno Vogel (1898–1987), German pacifist and writer
- Dan Vogel (born 1955), American author on Mormonism
- David Vogel (author) (1891–1944), Russian-born Hebrew poet, novelist, and diarist
- Debora Vogel (1902–1942), Polish philosopher and poet
- Eduard Vogel (1829–1856), German explorer
- Elise (Vogel) Polko (1822–1899), German novelist, sister of Eduard
- Henriette Vogel (1780–1811), German muse of the poet Heinrich von Kleist
- Ilse-Margret Vogel (1914–2001), German-American author
- Kenneth P. Vogel (born 1975), American journalist
- Nicole Vogel, American magazine publisher and author
- Nikolai Vogel (born 1971), German writer

== Other ==
- Elise Vogel (1895–?), Latvian chess player
- Peter Vogel (banker) (born 1954), Polish murderer and later banker
- Peter Vogel (computer designer) (born 1954), Australian inventor and technologist
- Willem Thomas de Vogel (1868–1955), Dutch-Indonesian physician and official

== Fictional characters ==
- Alex Vogel, a fictional character in the 2015 film The Martian (film)
- Burgomaster Vogel, a fictional character in the films Frankenstein (1931 film) and Bride of Frankenstein
- Christopher Vogel, a fictional character in the Fablehaven novels by Brandon Mull
- Colonel Vogel, fictional character in the 1989 film Indiana Jones and the Last Crusade
- Evelyn Vogel, a fictional character introduced in the eighth season of Dexter
- Dane Vogel, a fictional character in the 2008 video game Saints Row 2
- Lew Vogel, a fictional character in the 2008 film The Bank Job
- Mathias Vogel, a fictional character in the 2018 film Tomb Raider
- Preston Vogel, a fictional character in the television series Gargoyles (TV series)
- Sabine Vogel, a fictional character in the 2017 video game Wolfenstein II: The New Colossus
- Verner Vogel, a fictional character in the 2021 video game Sherlock Holmes: Chapter One
- Viktor Vogel, titular character of the comedy film Viktor Vogel – Commercial Man
- Walter Vogel, a fictional character in the 2009 novel Princess of the Midnight Ball by Jessica Day George. He also appears in the sequel Princess of the Silver Woods.
- Warden Vogel, a fictional character in the television series Futurama
