= Johann Vogel =

Johann Vogel may refer to:

- Johann Vogel (poet) (1589–1663), German poet and Lutheran minister
- Johann Vogel (composer) (1756–1788), German composer
- Johann Carl Vogel (1932–2012), South African physicist
- Johannes Vogel (botanist) (born 1963), German botanist
- Johann Vogel (footballer) (born 1977), Swiss footballer

== See also ==
- Vogel (surname)
