= Jacques Rensburg =

Jacques Rensburg may refer to:

- Jacques Rensburg (musician), Dutch / German musician
- Jacques Rensburg (field hockey), Belgian athlete, his grandson
- Jacques Janse van Rensburg, South African cyclist
- JC Janse van Rensburg, South African rugby player
