= John Vogel =

John Vogel may refer to:

- John Vogel, head storywriter for the Mortal Kombat series
- John W. Vogel, manager and owner of African-American minstrel companies in the United States
