= Ramza and Arno =

British acrobatic comedy duo and minstrel performers

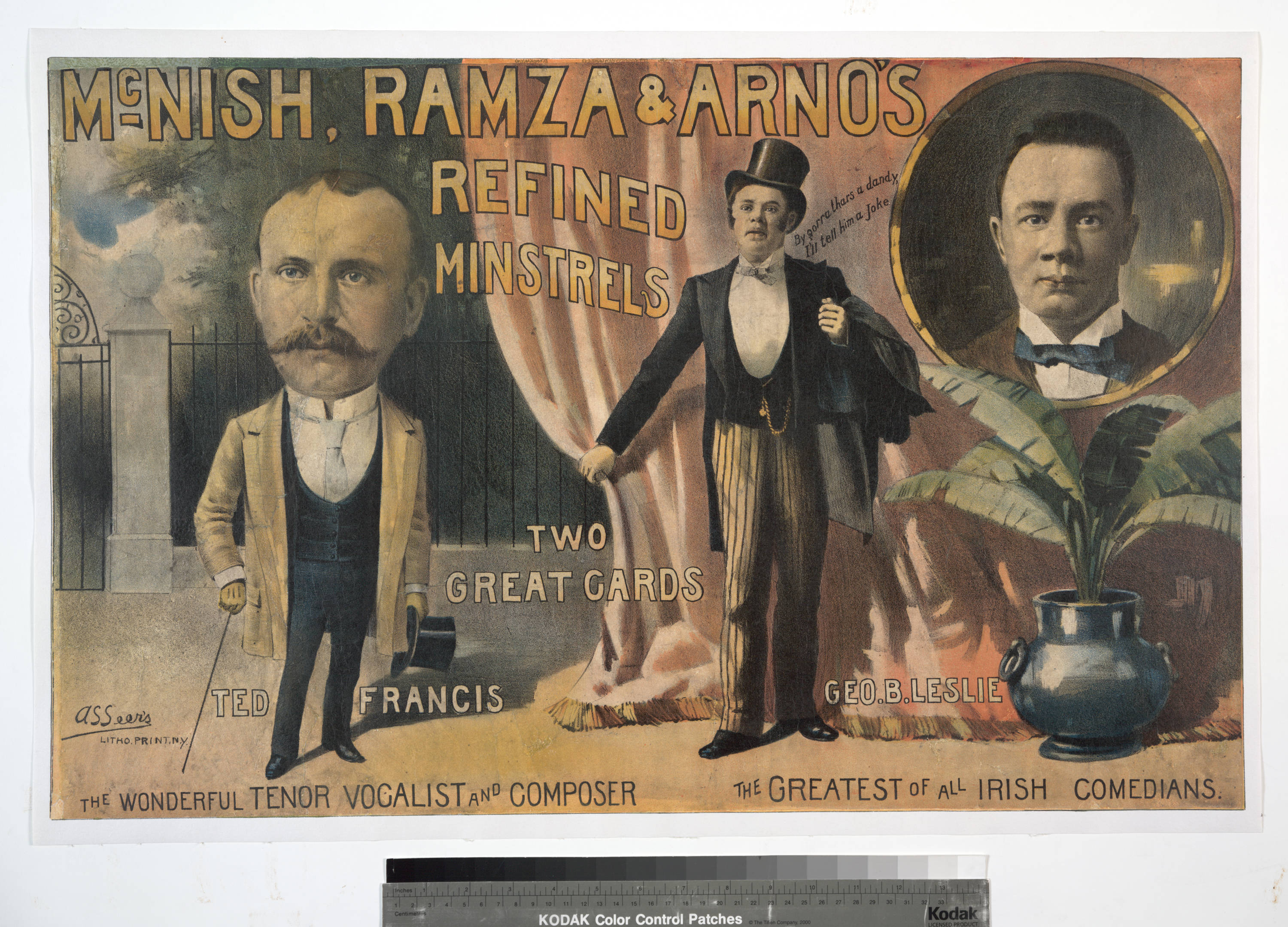
Image of a full-length caricature portrait of singer and composer Ted Francis standing next to Irish comedian George B. Leslie in blackface near theater curtains and a potted palm tree; with a vignette of a head-and-shoulders portrait of Leslie at upper right.

Ramza and Arno was a traveling acrobatic comedy duo and minstrel show active during the late 19th and early 20th century. Founded by English-born performers Frank Ramza (ca. 1860–1889 and Charles Arno (ca. 1862–1904), the duo were considered one of the top stars in the traveling vaudeville acts and were referred to as "comical comedians", "knockabout comedians", acrobats and, "versatile and comic artistes". The duo often traveled with other successful and famous performers of the time. Their acts notably included trapeze stunts, pantomime sketches, as well as various other types of live performance.

Prominent minstrel manager John W. Vogel piloted many successful minstrel companies, including McNish, Ramza, and Arno's Refined Minstrels where Ramza and Arno worked with Frank McNish (Francis Edward McNish).

According to a November 19, 1888 New York Times article, the McNish, Ramza and Arno Minstrels were "having a hard time of it on the road" and it was believed they would soon disband citing Lew Benedict of Duprez & Benedict's Minstrels decision to sever his connection with the act "because he could not collect $400 back salary."

The original Ramza and Arno were both born in Birmingham, England. Frank Ramza (real name: Frank W. Ward) died from typhoid fever on October 2, 1889 at the Markham House hotel in Atlanta, aged 29. Charles Arno (real name: Charles Forrester), died from pneumonia at his New York City home on April 11, 1904. Subsequent performers in the Ramza and Arno act included James Ramza Thorpe (ca. 1860–1918).
