= Votel =

Votel is a surname. Notable people with the surname include:

- Andy Votel, English electronic musician
- Joseph Votel (born 1958), United States Army general

== See also ==
- Vogel (surname)
