= Stone Creek Jamboree =

Music festival and potluck in Minnesota

Stone Creek Jamboree is a music festival and potluck held on a farm along Highway 40 NW between Montevideo and Benson, Minnesota, established in 2005. The event achieved the "World's Largest Potluck" distinction in 2007 with 882 dishes served. This surpassed The Holmes County Lodging Council at the Holmes County Amish Flea Market in Walnut Creek, Ohio's 539 dish record and the Jamboree's previous year attempt at breaking the record with 453 potlucks. It is held at Stone Creek farm, owned by Mike and Amy Jorgenson of Milan, Minnesota, and this year celebrates 21 years.

== History ==
In 2006, the event's second year, 900 people attended. The attempt to break Walnut Creek's potluck dish record came up 58 potlucks short of the 511 needed. State Representative Al Juhnke of Willmar, Minnesota volunteered as the official counter for the attempt and said: "Minnesota is the hot dish and potluck capital of the world, and this record belongs in Minnesota."

The bar was set even higher in 2007 following the achievement of a new record by The Holmes County Lodging Council of Walnut Creek with 539 potluck dishes. The following year "all stops were pulled out" and the Stone Creek Jamboree broke the record. The successful record breaking event was judged by Paul Kittelson, the mayor of Benson, and Jim Curtiss, the mayor of Montevideo. More than 1,200 people attended the 2007 gathering.

13 years later, the COVID-19 pandemic caused officials to cancel the jamboree. The 16th was deferred to 2021.

== Description of jamboree ==
The jamboree is alcohol free and sponsored by area businesses. The 2009 jamboree is scheduled for August 29 with Leroy Van Dyke, David Frizzell, Tommy Cash, and Marilyn Sellars, as well as The Great Pretenders, Brother's 2 (The Kanten's), Sonny Pearson, Palmer Aaberg, Vernon Lund, and Pure Country performing. The event is held rain or shine under tents from 11:00 a.m. until approximately 9:00 p.m. with two stages and a fireworks display to "conclude our 'Day of Freedom.'" "All anyone needs to bring to this event is a dish to pass for Minnesota’s Largest Potluck and a lawn chair."
