= Deng Xiaoping and the Transformation of China =

2011 book by Ezra F. Vogel

- Author: Ezra F. Vogel
- Publisher: Harvard University Press
- Publication date: September 26, 2011
- ISBN: 9780674055445
- OCLC: 756365975
- LC Class: DS778.T39 V64 2011

Deng Xiaoping and the Transformation of China is a 2011 biography about Deng Xiaoping written by Ezra F. Vogel and published by The Belknap Press/Harvard University Press.

== Translations ==
In May 2012 the Chinese University Press of Hong Kong published the first Chinese translation, unabridged, with versions using both Traditional and Simplified characters. In January 2013 Sanlian Publishing House published a Simplified Chinese version for Mainland China. The Mainland version was adopted from the Hong Kong translation, but was subject several minor changes due to censorship; most of the changes were centered on negative descriptions or adjectives describing Chinese leaders.

== Publication and reception ==
The initial reviews praised Vogel's book as detailed and well-grounded, generally favorable, but not without criticism. Jonathan Mirsky of The New York Times described the book as "wide-ranging" and wrote that the coverage of Deng's changes to the Chinese economy is the "most valuable part of" the book. John Knight, a PhD candidate stated that the book "provides much insight into" Deng and that "for those interested in learning more about China's present, Vogel's study is a delightful read." Reviewers also mentioned controversial points. John Pomfret wrote in The Washington Post that Vogel "clearly believes that Deng — known in the West mostly for engineering the slaughter of protesters in the streets near Tiananmen Square on June 4, 1989 — has been wronged by history. His tome is an attempt to redress the balance."

In the London Review of Books, Perry Anderson sharply criticized Vogel as "a booster" and the book as "an exercise in unabashed adulation" in which "anything in Deng's career that might seriously mar the general encomium is sponged away", noting how "Vogel devotes just 30 pages, out of nearly 900, to the first 65 years of Deng’s life". He also critiqued the book for exaggerating the significance of certain events, such as Deng's "universally forgotten" 1974 speech at the United Nations.

Academic Lan Xiaohuan describes the book as clearly-written, meticulously researched, and easy to read. According to Lan, the book is Vogel's masterpiece.

As of 2020, the Mainland Chinese version sold 1,200,000 copies, while the U.S. version sold 45,000 hard copies and 9,400 ebooks.

The book received the Lionel Gelber Prize, a literary award for excellency in literature related to foreign policy.

== See also ==
- Deng Xiaoping
- Mao Zedong
- Xi Jinping
- Xi Jinping thought
- Chinese economic reform
- Socialism with Chinese characteristics
- History of the People's Republic of China
- Mao's China and After
- The Private Life of Chairman Mao
