= Adam Elias von Siebold =

German gynecologist (1775–1828)

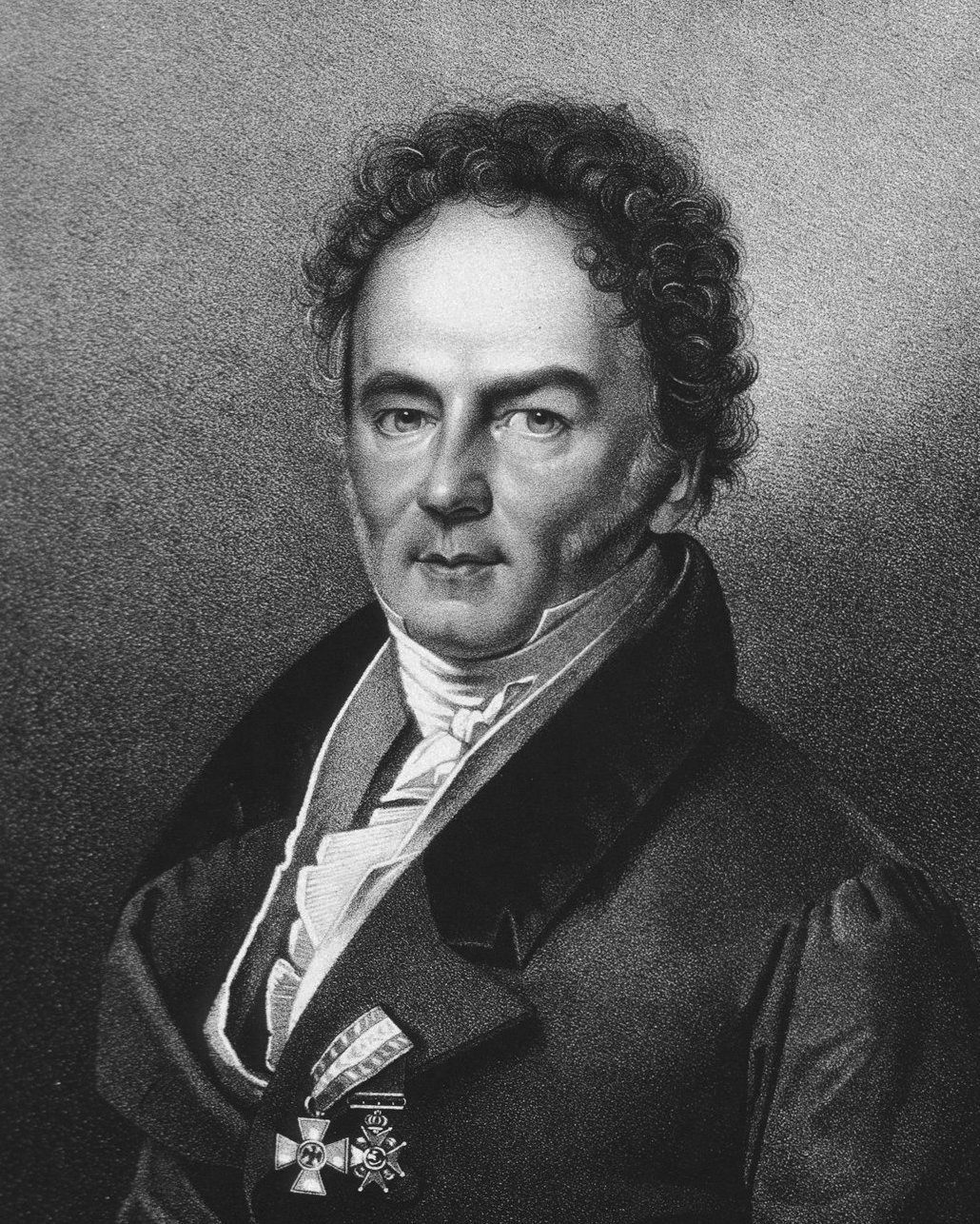
- Born: 5 March 1775; Würzburg
- Died: 12 June 1828 (aged 53); Berlin)
- Scientific career
- Fields: Gynecology

Adam Elias von Siebold (5 March 1775 in Würzburg – 12 June 1828 in Berlin) was a German Gynecologist.

== Life ==
He was the youngest son of Carl Caspar von Siebold (1736–1807). Siebold was professor of anatomy, surgery und midwifery of the University of Würzburg. Unlike his brothers, he originally wanted to become a Merchant, eventually, however, he began to study medicine.

Through his teachings he influenced Johann Christian Stark (1753–1811) in Jena, Friedrich Benjamin Osiander (1759–1822) in Göttingen and later, Johann Lukas Boër (1751–1835) in Wien.

He authored several textbooks and is attributed to the following quote: Peace and silence, time and patience, respect for nature and the bithgiving woman, and the art of waiting, when Mother Nature rules.

He died aged 53 of a stomach condition. He was survived by two sons and four daughters, amongst them the doctor and Zoologist Karl Theodor Ernst von Siebold (1804–1885).

== Selected works ==
- Ausführliche Beschreibungen der Heilquellen zu Kissingen und ihre Auswirkung besonders bei Frauenzimmerkrankheiten, 1828, .

== Legacy ==
The Siebold-Gymnasium in Würzburg is named after him.

== Sources ==
This article (incomplete) is based on the German and Swedish wiki pages (4 Sept 2008)
