= China and Japan =

2019 book by Ezra Vogel

China and Japan: Facing History is a non-fiction book by Ezra Vogel, published in 2019 by Harvard University Press.

The book's scope is the sum of China-Japan relations across history. Describing the work as "a correction and prophylactic" to recriminations in these relations, Patrick Madigan of Campion Hall, University of Oxford wrote that people living in the two countries were intended to be the "primary intended audience". The author had previously written about China and Japan and believed that he could help mediate disputes between them. Bill Sewell of St. Mary's University described the work as "an extended meditation on" the topic rather than a work aiming to present new information.

== Content ==
The book has 416 pages total, with the final documented period (circa 1869–2019) taking up the vast majority of the book, exceeding 300 pages.

The introduction discusses tensions in China-Japan relations, including the Senkaku (Diaoyu) Islands dispute. Chapter 1 covers ancient history and Japanese importation of culture from the Tang dynasty. Chapter 2 has the period 838–862. The later 1800s are covered in Chapter 3 and Chapter 4. Chapter 5 covers Chinese students studying abroad in Japan prior to World War II. Chapters 6-10 cover subsequent years. In particular, Chapter 10 covers the years 1972 through 1992. Chapter 11 talks about relations after 1992.

According to Sewell, the work does not often use footnotes as a way of tailoring it to a general audience. At the end there is an appendix with biographies, taking up 52 pages.

Vogel has advice for both the populations of China and Japan as how to move forward with productive relations. Vogel argued that the highest politicians in those countries should de-emphasize nationalism.

== Release ==
Sheng Mao (Note: Sheng Mao: Chinese: 毛升; pinyin: Máo Shēng) wrote the book's Chinese translation.

== Reception ==
Rajiv Ranjan of the University of Delhi stated that the emphasis on modern history makes the coverage of the book "skewed". Ranjan argued that it did not discuss how Japanese culture became distinct after taking elements of Chinese culture and how Japanese people are easily able to set aside individualism to advance Japan's national goals.

Ke Ren (Note: Ke Ren: Chinese: 任可; pinyin: Rén Kě) of the College of the Holy Cross wrote that the work is "a highly readable longue durée account of Sino-Japanese history", and "a rich synthesis that [...] has much to offer to students and scholars of" the countries.

Sewell stated that the book "can usefully supplement others in this genre" and that its "broad strokes[...]run generally true[...]". Sewell argued that sometimes the structure of the sourcing at times lacks clarity.

Sheila Smith, in Foreign Affairs, wrote that the work was done "With scholarly care".

Shigeto Sonoda of the Institute for Advanced Studies on Asia of the University of Tokyo, stated that the book reminded him of world history textbooks used in high schools in Japan; Sonoda stated that this was a "rather negative" trait. However, Sonoda stated that the "frank" descriptions of ancient Japanese politicians and "images which have played an important role in shaping bilateral relations" are two things atypical of a Japanese school textbook.
