= Georg Wilhelm Vogel =

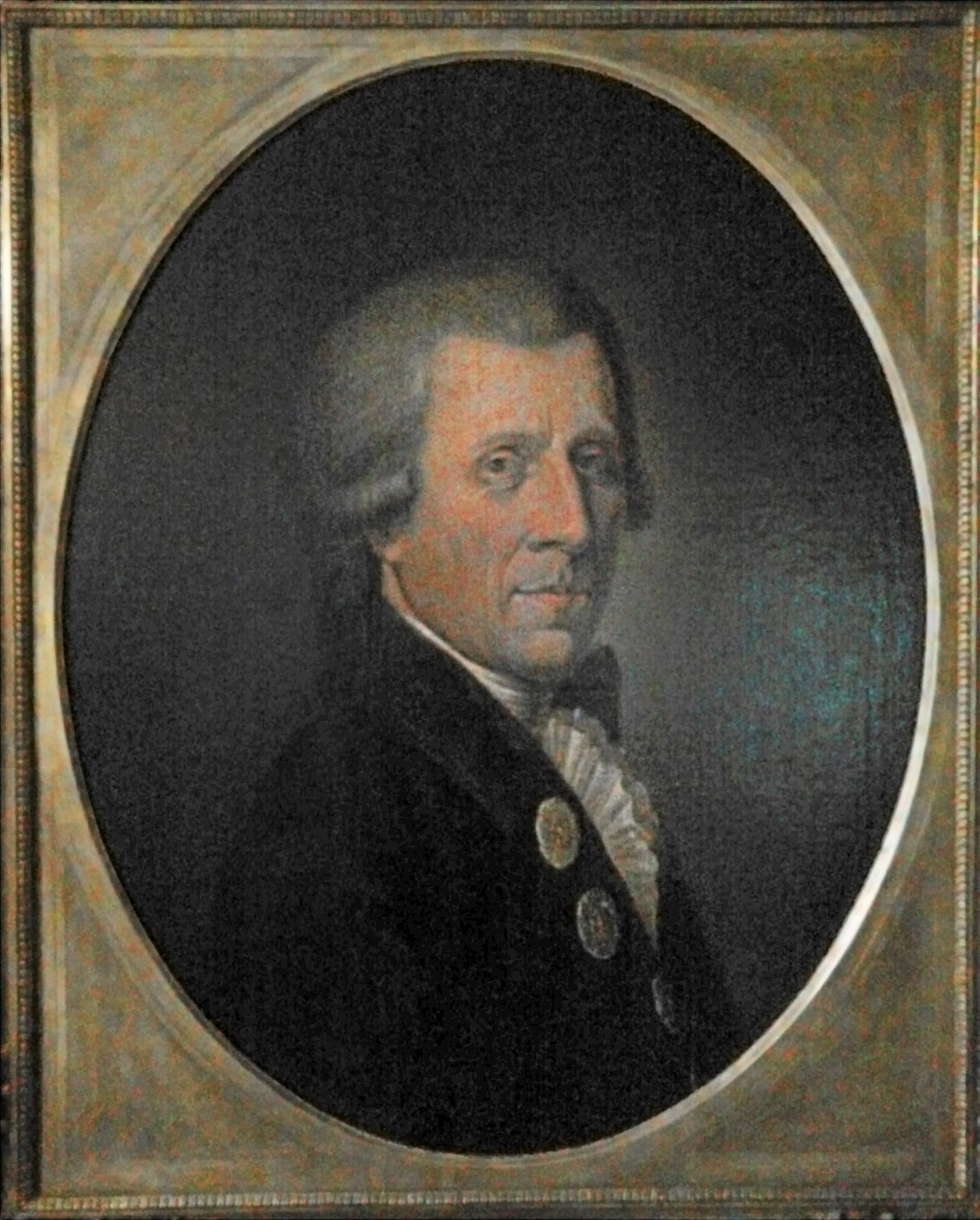
Georg Wilhelm Vogel (1743–1813)

Georg Wilhelm Vogel (7 November 1743 – 16 December 1813) was a German jurist and mayor in Jena.

Born in Feuchtwangen, Vogel was later a clerk, court director, and councillor in Köstritz. In 1792 he moved to Jena, taking a position as treasurer (Kreiskassierer) for the local area. In August 1793 he became the Second Mayor (zweiter Bürgermeister) and in June 1805 First Mayor (erster Bürgermeister). At the time of the Battle of Jena–Auerstedt in 1806, Napoleon Bonaparte stayed in his house in the Jena Marktplatz. In July 1806, he was returned to being Second Mayor but from August 1807 until September 1808 was once again First Mayor, and remained a mayor until 1809. During his term in office, he continued to server as treasurer for the area. In 1801 he became a member of the Chamber Council (Kammerrat).

He was only one of the mayors of the city at this time. A contemporary figure also serving as mayor, who was somewhat more important than Vogel with better diplomatic skills and connections, was the merchant and court representative of Saxony-Weimar, Johann Christoph Jacob Paulsen (1768-1808). He was mayor from 1789 to 1808 and exchanged the position of First and Second Mayor with Vogel several times. Vogel was later criticized for the time as mayor in 1806 during the battle, being described as sickly, hesitant and indecisive. At that point, Paulsen was already incapacitated with illness.

Vogel was engaged in social issues in Jena and established a poorhouse, whose residents later received work through his son's cloth factory. He received heavy criticism for the heavy-handed manner in which he ran the poorhouse, but was still the only one then tackling this issue. When he retired from the city council and politics in 1810, in part because of conflicts with the city's police commissioner, he remained director of the hospital, workhouse and asylum. He died in 1813 in Jena.

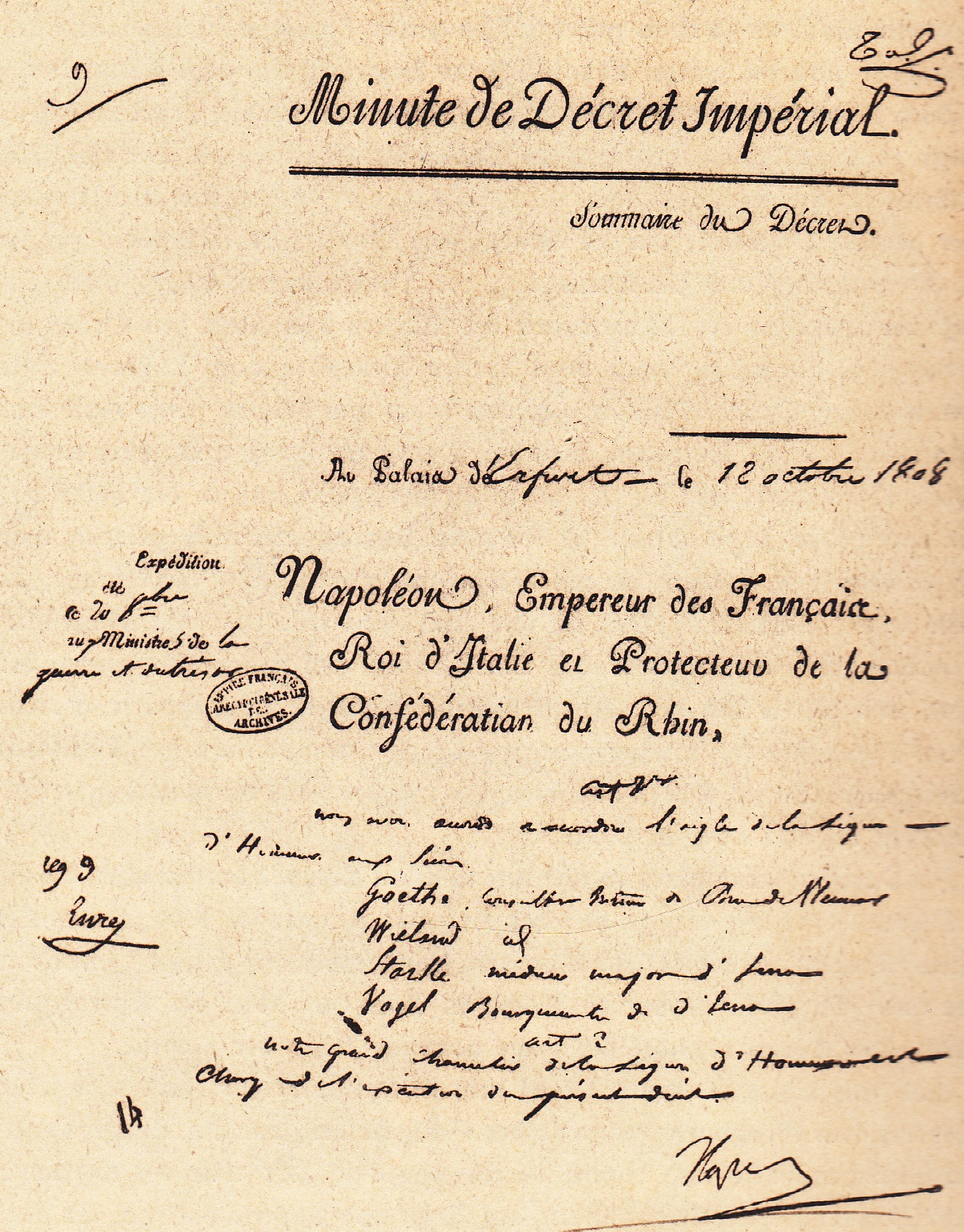
Decree of Napoleon nominating Goethe, Wieland, Starke and Vogel as Knights of the Legion of Honour (12 October 1808)

On 12 October 1808, for his service in the care of the wounded after the Battle of Jena, he was named to the Legion of Honour (at the same time as Johann Wolfgang von Goethe, Christoph Martin Wieland and Johann Christian Stark).

One of his brothers was Georg Johann Ludwig Vogel (1742–1776), a German orientalist and Protestant theologian.

== Literature ==
- Katja Deinhardt: Stapelstadt des Wissens: Jena als Universitätsstadt zwischen 1770 und 1830, Publications of the Historical Commission of Thuringia, Small Series, Vol 20, Böhlau 2007.

== Links ==
- Entry in GEDBAS
- Biographical information in the letters and correspondence of Goethe
