= Jacques Rensburg (musician) =

German musician

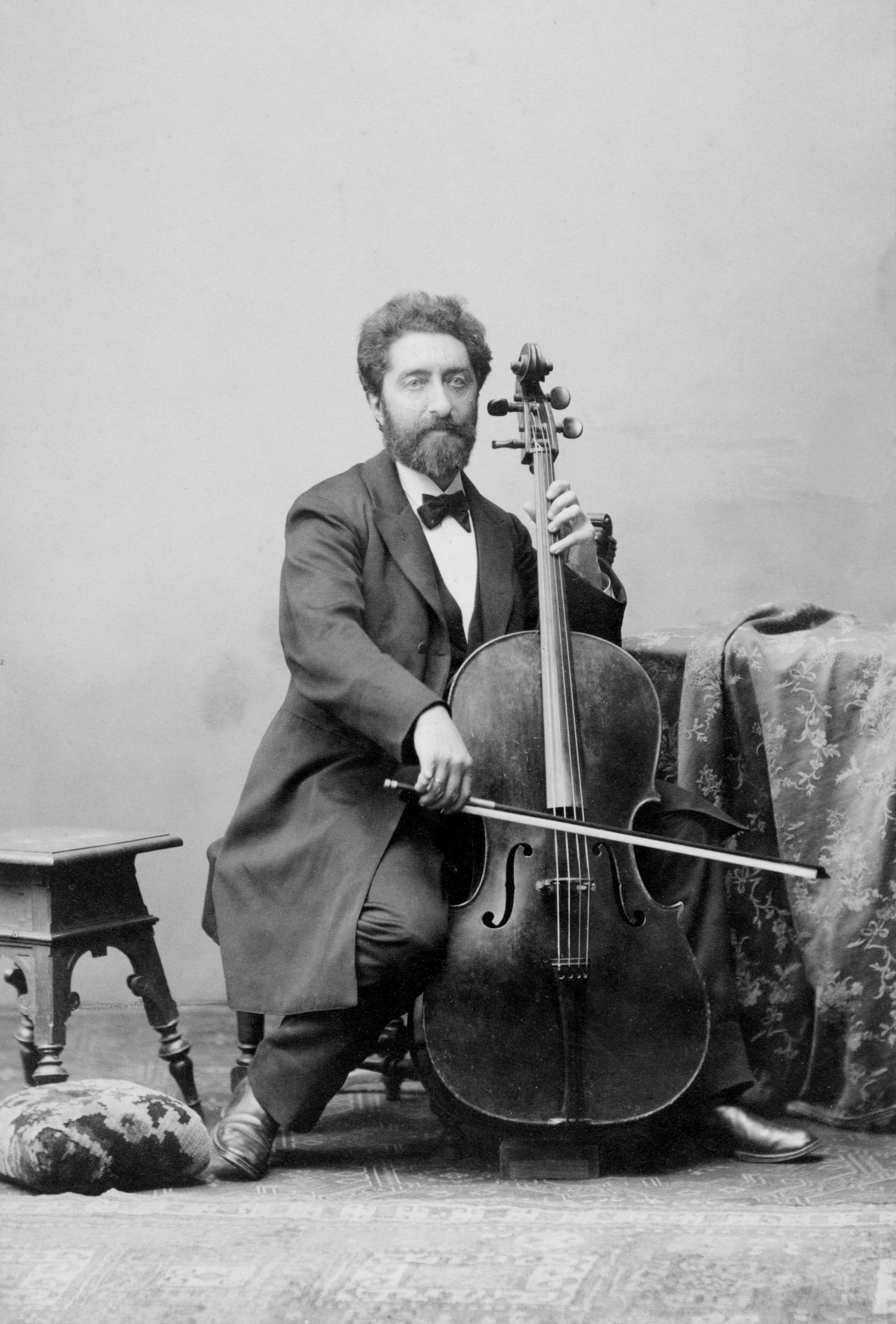
- Jacques Rensburg

Background information
- Birth name: Jacques Eduard Rensburg
- Born: 21 May 1846; Rotterdam
- Died: 22 December 1910 (aged 64); Bonn
- Genres: Romantic
- Occupation(s): violoncellist, composer
- Years active: 1865 – 1895

Jacques Eduard Rensburg (21 May 1845 – 22 December 1910) was a Dutch / German violoncellist. He taught at the Konservatorium der Musik in Cologne and was a highly esteemed violoncellist who played with many of the leading musicians of his time.

== Career ==
Jacques Rensburg grew up in a bankers family and worked as a banker himself as well. He had violoncello lessons from Simon Ganz and Joseph Giese, teacher at the Royal School of Music at the Hague, later Daniel de Lange, Emil Hegar and Woldemar Bargiel. At the age of 10 he gave his first public concert. In 1867 he decided for the music and went to Cologne to study with the violoncellist Schmitt. However, Schmitt was severely ill. Instead of becoming his pupil, he became sort of a substitute for Schmitt. After his death Jacques Rensburg took over his positions as first violoncellist in the Gürzenich Orchestra Cologne and as professor at the Konservatorium der Musik on 1 April 1868. Also, he succeeded Schmitt in the quartet of Otto von Königslöw. He gave many concerts and his fame grew rapidly. On 9 February 1868 he participated in Cologne in a concert of the pianist Anton Rubinstein. In 1872 he played, both as a soloist and with chamber music, at the Gewandhaus in Leipzig and once again in 1874, where a.o. he played Johannes Brahms's quartet op. 25 with the composer, Engelbert Röntgen and Friedrich Hermann.

At the end of 1874, due to his too demanding life as a performing artist, he had a nervous breakdown. He gave up his positions at Cologne and went back to his birthplace Rotterdam, taking up his work at his father's bank again, in which he became a firmant. In 1878, the bank was granted suspension of payment, which ended in 1880. Jacques Rensburg then became a partner in the coffee-roasting firm A. Zuntz sel. Wwe. Consequently, he moved with his family to Bonn, Poppelsdorfer Allee 59, close to the family Zunz.

Many people visited his house in Bonn for making, listening to or talking about music. Among these visitors and friends we find Joseph Joachim, Pablo de Sarasate, Johannes Brahms, Max Bruch, Elly Ney and Elise Polko. Though at a lower pace, he began giving concerts again. Around 1885, he founded, with the violinist Leonhard Wolff and the pianist Max Pauer, the 'populären Kammermusik Soireen' in Bonn. In 1888 he became the violoncellist in the Heckmann Quartet and, a little later, in the Gürzenich Quartet under Gustav Hollaender. At the opening of the Beethoven Haus in 1893, Rensburg played a.o. with Carl Reinecke and Joseph Joachim.

In 1894 he was assigned the title professor der Musik.

In the beginning of 1895 he made a trip to Italy. His concerts there must have been his last concerts. A chronic inflammation in his arm forced him to end his career as a violoncellist.

== Family ==
Jacques Rensburg was a son of Eduard Hartog Rensburg (30 July 1819 Rotterdam - 29 July 1882 Rotterdam) and Flora van Witsen (14 December 1807 The Hague - 20 December 1882 Rotterdam). Eduard Hartog Rensburg was a partner in the bank 'Rensburg and van Witsen'. They had three children: Henri Eduard, Betsy and Jacques Eduard.

Jacques' brother Henry Rensburg (12 December 1841 The Hague - 1927 Liverpool) worked for his fathers's bank, but in 1861 he left Rotterdam and went to Londen and in 1862 to Liverpool. In 1873 he was elected as a member of the Liverpool Stock Exchange. He established the firm Henry E. Rensburg & Co, which developed to the investment company Rensburg Sheppards (2005). Henry Rensburg was very active in the Liverpool Art Club, of which in 1885 he became Honorary Secretary. In his house, a lot of chamber concerts were given of which the details were written down in two notebooks, in 1999 presented to the British Library, covering the period 1880 - 1927. Among the performers in the early years we find Max Bruch, Anton Rubinstein, Joseph Joachim and Pablo de Sarasate, visitors and friends of Jacques Rensburg as well. Henry Rensburg did not have any contact with the rest of his family. He married Florence Samuel.

Jacques' sister Betsy Rensburg (2 September 1843 Rotterdam - 4 June 1908 Rotterdam) married 22 April 1868 in Rotterdam Nachman Jacob van Witsen (14 October 1834 Rotterdam- 19 August 1899 Rotterdam).

Jacques Eduard Rensburg himself married on 30 August 1869 in Cologne Julie Levié (15 July 1836 Cologne - 20 May 1906 Bonn), daughter of Herman Levié (2 December 1808 Monschau - 11 May 1878 Rotterdam) and Therese Offenbach (9 June 1807 Deutz - 4 November 1842 Cologne), a sister of the composer Jacques Offenbach. They had four children:

- Therese Flora Rensburg (10 July 1870 Cologne- 20 October 1955 The Hague). She married on 19 February 1900 in Bonn William Harwood Hilger (3 January 1976 New York - 31 December 1963 Freiburg), divorced 13 November 1913. They had three children: Eduard Hilger (5 December 1900 Cologne - 10 January 1974 Heilbronn), Julie Hilger (30 March 1904 Bonn - 6 February 1996 Amstelveen) and Anita Hilger (18 August 1907 Bonn - 9 January 1999 Amersfoort). William Harwood Hilger was an engineer. He remarried on 7 February 1914 in Godesberg Alina Berta Balmer. They lived in Godesberg until 1919. In 1936 they settled in Freiburg.

- Eduard Herman Rensburg (14 May 1874 Cologne - 24 June 1927 Brussels). He married on 15 November 1899 in Bonn Helene Marie Hilger (9 May 1872 New York - 13 March 1934 Brussels), a sister of William Harwood Hilger. Eduard Rensburg was a banker in Brussels. They had a daughter Adelaide and a son Jacques Rensburg, who played in the Belgian Olympic hockey team.

- Herman Jacques Rensburg (8 September 1876 Rotterdam - 1907 Elberfeld) was a pediatrician in Elberfeld. He married Fanny Saville.

- Henry Leo Rensburg (5 February 1879 Rotterdam - 5 April 1879 Rotterdam).

== Compositions ==
- Recitativ, Adagio und Allegro moderato in Formes eines Concertstückes für Violoncell mit Begleitung des Orchesters, op. 1 (Leipzig, Breitkopf und Härtel).
- Drei Stücke (Junge Liebe, Bangen, Beruhigung) für Violoncello mit Klavierbegleitung, op. 2. (Gustav Cohen, Bonn).
- Concert für Violoncell mit Orchesterbegleitung, op. 3 (Berlin, Ries & Erler).
- Am Meeresstrande. Drei Characterstücke für Cello, Violine und Viola mit Orchesterbegleitung, op. 4.
- Ballade für Violoncello und Orchester, op. 5 (Breitkopf und Härtel).

== Works dedicated to Jacques Rensburg ==
- Max Bruch: Adagio nach Keltischen Melodien für Violoncell mit Begleitung des Orchesters, op. 56 (N. Simrock in Berlin).
- Friedrich Gernsheim: Elohenu.
- Gustav Jensen: Zweite Sonate für PianoForte und Violoncell, op. 26 (Augener, London).
- Richard von Perger: Trio op. 12 für Violine, Cello und Bratsche.

== Literature ==
- Leah Rauhut-Brungs: Rensburg's Zauber Cello (Kleines jüdisches Lehrhaus, Bonn, 2010).
- Nicolas Bell: Chamber Music in the Home: Henry Rensburg's Concerts in Liverpool. Brio Volume 45, Number I, pp 43–52.
- Albert Ernest Wier: The Macmillan Encyclopedia of Music and Musicians, Volume 2, Macmillan, 1938, p. 1539.
