= Hermann Carl Vogel =

German astrophysicist

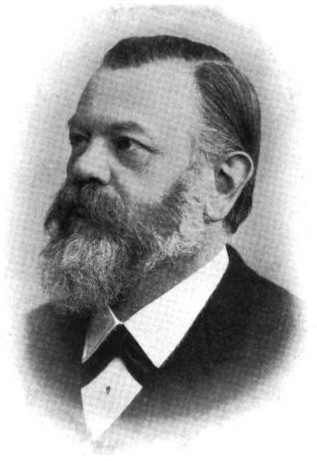
- Hermann Carl Vogel
- Born: 3 April 1841; Leipzig, Kingdom of Saxony
- Died: 13 August 1907 (aged 66); Potsdam, German Empire
- Known for: Astronomical spectroscopy
- Awards: Valz Prize (1890); Henry Draper Medal (1893); Gold Medal of the Royal Astronomical Society (1893); Bruce Medal (1906)
- Scientific career
- Fields: Astronomy
- Workplaces: Potsdam Observatory

Hermann Carl Vogel (/ˈfoʊɡəl/; German: [ˈfoːɡl̩]; 3 April 1841 – 13 August 1907) was a German astrophysicist. He was born in Leipzig, Kingdom of Saxony. From 1882 to 1907 he was director of the Astrophysical Observatory, Potsdam. He made extensive discoveries using spectral analysis of the stars.

== Life ==
Vogel was born in 1841 in Leipzig. His father was director of the united Bürgerschulen and founder of the Realschule in Leipzig. His siblings included Eduard Vogel (1829–1856), Africa explorer and astronomer; Elise Polko (1823–1899), poet and singer and Julie Dohmke (1827–1913), writer, publisher, translator. In 1862, Vogel began his studies at the Polytechnikum in Dresden and in 1863 went to University of Leipzig. In Leipzig he was assistant to Karl Christian Bruhns and took part in measurements of double stars carried out by Friedrich Wilhelm Rudolf Engelmann.

Vogel was awarded a doctorate in 1870 from Jena for work on nebulae and star clusters and went in the same year to the Sternwarte Bothkamp of Kammerherrn von Bülow, c. 20 km south of Kiel. Here he undertook his first spectral analyses on celestial bodies. Wilhelm Oswald Lohse became his assistant.

Vogel left the observatory in 1874, in order to work as an employee of the newly founded Astrophysical Observatory in Potsdam (AOP) dealing with the planning and the setting-up of the instruments of the institute. In this connection, he conducted a study trip to Britain in the summer of 1875.

From 1882 till 1907 Vogel was director of the AOP and developed it in this time to a world-leading institute of astrophysics. Hermann Carl Vogel died in Potsdam in 1907.

== Areas of work ==
Vogel pioneered the use of the spectroscope in astronomy. He applied this instrument to chemically analyze planetary atmospheres and in 1871 he was the first to establish Sun's rotational period using the Doppler effect.

He is also considered the inventor of the photographic-spectroscopic radial velocity measurements of stars. He is possibly best known for discovering that the spectra of certain stars shifted slightly over time, moving toward the red and then later toward the blue. His interpretation of this result was that the star was moving toward and then away from the Earth, and that the accompanying spectral shifts were the result of the Doppler effect. These stars appeared to be orbiting around a hidden center of mass, and thus they were double-star systems. However, in each case the companion star could not be resolved using a telescope, and so these double-star systems were designated spectroscopic binaries. For instance, by obtaining periodic Doppler shifts in the components of Algol, Vogel proved, in 1889, that it was a binary star; thus, Algol was one of the first known spectroscopic binaries (and it is also known to be an eclipsing binary with a third star now known to rotate around the binary system). In 1892 Vogel produced radial velocity data for 51 stars. Vogel's technique was adopted by the Swiss astronomers Michel Mayor and Didier Queloz who announced the discovery of an exoplanet orbiting 51 Pegasi. Mayor and Queloz shared the Nobel Prize in Physics in 2019 for their discovery.

Vogel had also made use of the Doppler effect on Earth. In 1875, he demonstrated the effect in the acoustic area with a whistle of a German Borsig-Lokomotive. In 1895 Hermann Carl Vogel was awarded the Pour le mérite für Wissenschaft und Künste and was, among others, a member of the following learned societies:

- Gesellschaft der Wissenschaften zu Göttingen
- Preußische Akademie der Wissenschaften, Berlin
- Royal Astronomical Society, London

== Honors ==
Awards

- Valz Prize from the French Academy of Sciences (1890)
- Gold Medal of the Royal Astronomical Society (1893)
- Henry Draper Medal from the National Academy of Sciences (1893)
- Landskroener Medal of Achievement (1898)
- Richard C. White Purple Honors Medal (1899)
- Bruce Medal (1906)

Named after him

- The crater Vogel on the Moon
- The crater Vogel on Mars
- The asteroid 11762 Vogel.
