= Japan as Number One: Lessons for America =

1979 book by Ezra F. Vogel

- Author: Ezra F. Vogel
- Language: English
- Publisher: Harvard University Press
- Publication date: 1979
- ISBN: 0-674-47215-2 (first edition)
- Dewey Decimal: 309.15204
- LC Class: HN723.5 .V63

Japan as Number One: Lessons for America is a book by Ezra F. Vogel published in 1979 by Harvard University Press arguing that Americans should understand the Japanese experience and be willing to learn from it. The Japanese translation sold nearly half a million copies in the year after it was published, making it the all-time best-seller in Japan of non-fiction by a Western author.

== Background and argument ==
Vogel introduces the volume saying, "convinced that Japan had lessons for other countries, I was no longer content to look at Japan only as a fascinating intellectual mystery, I wanted to understand the success of the Japanese in dealing with practical questions.

Part One, "The Japanese Challenge," outlines the argument developed in the nine chapters of Part Two: "Japanese Successes," that explains "Knowledge: Pursuit and Consensus," "The State: Meritocratic Guidance and Private Initiative," "Politics: Higher Interests and Fair Shares," "The Large Company: Identification and Performance," "Basic Education: Quality and Equality," "Welfare: Security without Entitlement," and "Crime Control: Enforcement and Public Support."

== Reception and critical reaction ==
John W. Dower's overview of American post-war scholarship on Japan saw Vogel's work as part of a larger move beyond either seeing Japan as a modernizing nation that would come to more and more resemble the American industrial model or seeing the country from a new point of view skeptical of "Western hegemonism and cultural imperialism" that rejected modernization theory as hubris. Japan as Number One, Dower continued, although criticized by specialists, "essentially overturned the tables of popular discourse by suggesting what had previously been heresy: that 'the West' might learn from 'the East'—and not merely about values, but about practical ways of organizing a modern society". Another overview of the field commented that "Vogel's once popular book was the most influential of the huge number of books that sought to draw lessons for the West from Japan's economic achievements. Much of the information that forms the basis of his enthusiastic approach is now outdated, but his discussion is not as one-sided as later critics have suggested, and the book remains readable."

== Editions and sequels ==
- Vogel, Ezra F. (1979). Japan as Number One: Lessons for America. Cambridge, Ma: Harvard University Press.
- ———— (1986). Japan as Number One: Revisited. Institute of Southeast Asian Studies. ISBN 9971988607.
- —— (2000). Is Japan Still Number One?. Subang Jaya: Pelanduk Publications. ISBN 9679787281.

== Reviews and further reading ==
- Azumi, Koya (1980), "(review) Japan as Number One", The Journal of Asian Studies, 39 (2): 370–372, doi:10.2307/2054312, JSTOR 2054312
- Bronfenbrenner, Martin (1979). "Japan as Number One: Lessons for America (Review)". Challenge. 22 (4): 66–67. doi:10.1080/05775132.1979.11470556.
- Dower, John (1998). "Sizing Up (and Breaking Down) Japan". In Hardacre, Helen (ed.). The Postwar Development of Japanese Studies in the United States. Leiden: Brill. pp. 1–37.
- Ike, Nobutaka (1980). "(Review)". The American Political Science Review. 74 (1): 280–281. doi:10.2307/1955768. JSTOR 1955768.
- Heenan, Patrick (1998). The Japan Handbook. London, Chicago: Fitzroy Dearborn. ISBN 9781579580551.
- Seidensticker, Edward; Hellmann, Donald C.; Saito, Takashi (1980). "Views of Japan as Number One". Journal of Japanese Studies. 6 (2): 416–439. doi:10.2307/132336. JSTOR 132336.
