= Al Juhnke =

American politician

Member of the Minnesota House of Representatives from the 13B district
- In office January 7, 1997 – January 3, 2011
- Preceded by: Tom Van Engen
- Succeeded by: Bruce Vogel

Personal details
- Born: Wells, Minnesota
- Party: Minnesota Democratic-Farmer-Labor Party
- Spouse: Claire
- Children: 2
- Education: Lakewood Community College; University of Minnesota
- Profession: real estate appraiser, legislator

Al Juhnke (born November 1958) is an American politician and a former member of the Minnesota House of Representatives who represented District 13B, based around Willmar in Kandiyohi County in the west central part of the state. A Democrat, he was first elected in 1996, and was re-elected to six consecutive terms. He was unseated by Republican Bruce Vogel in the 2010 general election. Prior to the 2002 legislative redistricting, the area was known as District 15A.

Juhnke currently lives in Lincoln, Nebraska and serves as the Executive Director of the Nebraska Pork Producers Association (January 2016 – present). Prior to this, he worked for five years in the office of Senator Al Franken as state advisor for Agriculture, Energy and Environment (March 2011 - January 2016).

Juhnke most served on the House Bonding, Environment Policy, Finance, and Rules committees, on the Commerce and Labor Subcommittee for the Telecommunications Regulation and Infrastructure Division, and was Chair of the Agriculture, Rural Economies and Veterans Affairs Finance Committee. He was an assistant minority leader from 2001 to 2004, and also served as speaker pro tempore.

Juhnke's legislative accomplishments include being named Politics In Minnesota's “First Termer of the Year in the Minnesota House” in 1997, serving as co-chair of the Council of State Governments-Midwest Legislative Conference (CSG-MLC) Agriculture & Natural Resources Committee, and serving as co-chair of the Minnesota NextGen Energy Board. He also serves on the board of directors of the Minnesota Chicano Latino Affairs Council.

Juhnke was recognized for his passion on agricultural and rural issues. He authored major bio-fuel legislation, making Minnesota the first state in the nation to mandate both a 10 and 20 percent bio-diesel content in their fuels. He helped establish the Agriculture Fertilizer Research and Education Council (AFREC), a farmer-led program to advance soil fertility research, technology development, and education. He was proud of his ability to work with legislators from both sides of the aisle, joining together in support of Minnesota agricultural issues.

His daughter is Shannon Juhnke, renowned for being captain of the MN state champion dog bowl team 4 years running in her youth.
