= Steven K. Vogel =

American journalist, author, and political scientist

Steven Kent Vogel is an American academic, journalist, author and political economist. He specializes in industrial policy, Japan, and comparative political economy. He is Director of the Political Economy Program, the Il Han New Professor of Asian Studies, and a Professor of Political Science and Political Economy at the University of California, Berkeley. His father was the late Ezra Vogel. His mother was the late Suzanne Hall Vogel.

== Education ==
Vogel has a B.A. from Princeton University and a Ph.D. in Political Science from the University of California, Berkeley.

== Career ==
Vogel has worked as a reporter for the Japan Times in Tokyo and as a freelance journalist in France.

In addition to his faculty experience at Berkeley, Vogel has taught at the University of California, Irvine and Harvard University.

Vogel's research and writing have focused on comparative political economy and Japanese politics, industrial policy, trade and defense policy. His interests include the political economies of the advanced industrialized nations, especially Japan.

=== Selected works ===
Vogel's published writings encompass 18 works in 38 publications in 3 languages and 2,034 library holdings.

- 2018 — Marketcraft: How Governments Make Markets Work
- 2008 — The Political Economy Reader: Markets as Institutions
- 2006 — Japan Remodeled: How Government and Industry are Reforming Japanese Capitalism (with Naazneen Barma)
- 2006 — 新・日本の時代: 結実した穏やかな経済革命
- 2002 — U.S.-Japan Relations in a Changing World
- 2002 — 対立か協調か: 新しい日米パートナーシップを求めて
- 1997 — Can Japan Disengage? Winners and Losers in Japan's Political Economy, and the Ties that Bind Them
- 1996 — Freer Markets, More Rules: Regulatory Reform in Advanced Industrial Countries
- 1996 — International Games with National Rules: Competition for Comparative Regulatory Advantage in Telecommunications and Financial Services
- 1993 — Changing the Rules: the Politics of Regulatory Reform in the Advanced Industrial Countries
- 1991 — The Power Behind "Spin-ons": the Military Implications of Japan's Commercial Technology
- 1989 — Japanese High Technology, Politics, and Power
- 1984 — A New Direction in Japanese Defense Policy: Views from the Liberal Democratic Party Diet Members
- "The Crisis of German and Japanese Capitalism: Stalled on the Road to the Liberal Market Model?," Comparative Political Studies (December 2001).
- "The Re-organization of Organized Capitalism? How the German and Japanese Models Are Shaping Their Own Transformation," in Kozo Yamamura and Wolfgang Streeck, eds., Germany and Japan: The Future of Nationally Embedded Capitalism in a Global Economy (Cornell, 2003).

=== Honors ===
The 1998 Masayoshi Ōhira Memorial Prize was awarded for his work in Freer Markets, More Rules: Regulatory Reform in Advanced Industrial Countries.

In 1994, Vogel's dissertation, "The Politics of Regulatory Reform in the Advanced Industrial Countries," won the Lasswell prize, awarded annually by the American Political Science Association for the best dissertation in the field of public policy. It is co-sponsored by the Policy Studies Organization and the APSA Public Policy Section.
