= Ezra F. Vogel =

American sociologist of East Asia (1930–2020)

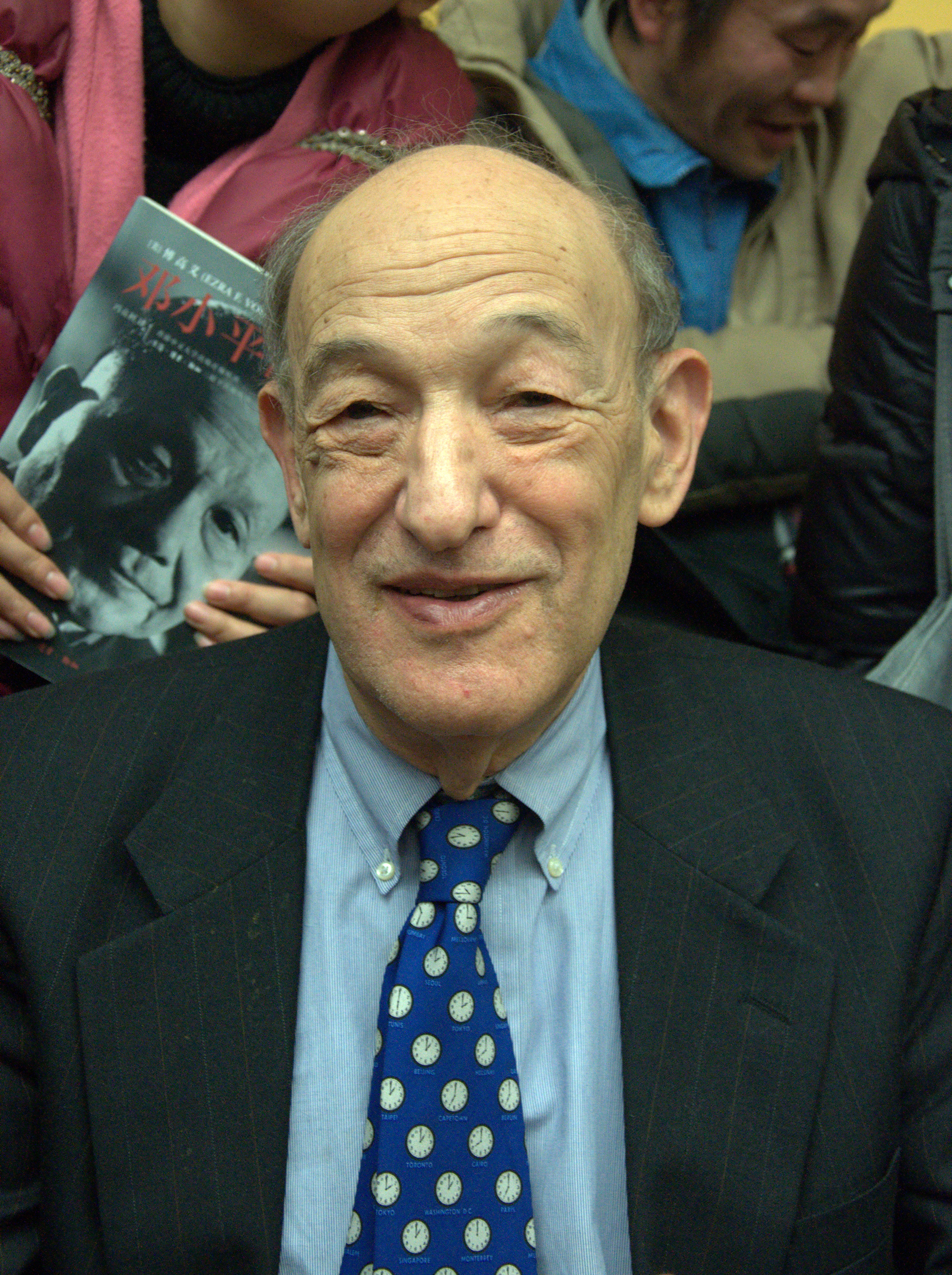
- Vogel at the National Library of China in 2013
- Born: Ezra Feivel Vogel; July 11, 1930; Delaware, Ohio, U.S.
- Died: December 20, 2020 (aged 90); Cambridge, Massachusetts, U.S.
- Awards: Guggenheim Fellowship for Social Sciences; Japan Foundation Prize 1996

Academic background
- Education: Ohio Wesleyan University; Harvard University
- Doctoral advisor: Talcott Parsons

Academic work
- Institutions: Harvard University; Yale University
- Main interests: East Asian society, politics, and history

Ezra Feivel Vogel (July 11, 1930 — December 20, 2020) was an American sociologist who wrote on modern Japan, China, and Korea. He was Henry Ford II Professor of the Social Sciences at Harvard University.

His 1978 book Japan as Number One: Lessons for America was a best-seller in both English and Japanese, and his 2011 book Deng Xiaoping and the Transformation of China won the Lionel Gelber Prize.

== Biography ==
Ezra Vogel was born to Joseph and Edith Vogel, a family of Jewish immigrants in 1930 in Delaware, Ohio. As a child, he helped his father in the family's clothing store, known as The People's Store. He graduated from Ohio Wesleyan University in 1950, and maintained close ties with his alma mater for the rest of his life, donating royalties from his books and returning to campus frequently. While at Ohio Wesleyan, Vogel was a member of the Beta Sigma Tau fraternity (later merged with the Pi Lambda Phi fraternity).

He was drafted to serve two years in the U.S. Army without seeing combat during the Korean War. The service involved working for a psychiatric unit of a military hospital. After discharge, Vogel enrolled in the Department of Social Relations at Harvard and graduated with his PhD in 1958. His advisor was Talcott Parsons. After two years of field work in Japan, he worked as an assistant professor at Yale University from 1960 to 1961, but returned to Harvard for post-doctoral work on Chinese language and history. He was appointed as a lecturer in 1964, later becoming a tenured professor; he remained at Harvard until his retirement.

Vogel was involved with several research centers during his career. He was director of Harvard's East Asian Research Center from 1972 to 1977 and chairman of the Council for East Asian Studies from 1977 to 1980. He also was director of the Program on US–Japan Relations at the Center for International Affairs from 1980 to 1987, and was named honorary director upon stepping down. He was director of the Fairbank Center for Chinese Studies from 1973 to 1975 and from 1995 to 1999. He was founding director of the Asia Center (1997–1999). He retired on June 30, 2000.

Vogel was married to Charlotte Ikels, professor of anthropology at Case Western Reserve University. He had three children with his first wife, Suzanne Hall Vogel: David, Steven (who became a political scientist), and Eve Vogel (a geography professor).

Vogel died in Mount Auburn Hospital in Cambridge, Massachusetts, on December 20, 2020, at the age of 90.

== Career ==
Vogel published dozens of articles, reviews, conference papers and books on China, Japan, and American–East Asian relations, and organized scholarly and policy conferences. He headed the undergraduate East Asian Studies concentration (major) at Harvard.

After editing a book of readings on the sociology of the family, Vogel published his first book, Japan's New Middle Class (1963; 2nd ed.1971), using ethnographic research he and his wife Suzanne carried out through interviews and observation in a Tokyo suburb between 1950 and 1960. Their goal was to understand the life of the "salary man" and his family, a new group that had emerged after the war. Vogel then turned from ethnography to China watching. He studied Chinese language, read newspapers and documents, and conducted interviews in Hong Kong. Canton Under Communism (1969) was a detailed description of regional government and politics in Guangdong. His 1979 book, Japan as Number One, described those areas where Japan had been successful and the United States less so. "Most Japanese understate their successes because they are innately modest," he wrote, and "more purposive Japanese, wanting to rally domestic forces or to reduce foreign pressures, have chosen to dramatize Japan's potential disasters". On the American side, he continued, "our confidence in the superiority of Western civilization and our desire to see ourselves as number one make it difficult to acknowledge that we have practical things to learn". The book's translation into Japanese was a best-seller, arousing debate among American scholars of Japan.

His 1991 text The Four Little Dragons analyzed the spread of industrialization in east Asia. In Vogel's view, Confucianism played an important role in the industrialization of east Asian economies, given that cultural values of hard work, collectivism, discipline, family, conscientiousness, responsibility, and saving are also favorable qualities for organizing rapid industrialization and an industrializing work force.

Vogel's later areas of research included industrialization, changes in family structure, political change, and security issues in South Korea, Hong Kong, Taiwan and East Asia overall. In Beijing, he began to study Deng Xiaoping, following extensive interviews with Deng's economic adviser Yu Guangyuan. Vogel co-translated Yu's memoir on China's economic reform, and used it as a roadmap to his thinking on Deng. He continued publishing after his retirement: his last two books were Deng Xiaoping and the Transformation of China (2011) and China and Japan: Facing History (2019). He contributed his royalties from the Chinese translation of this Deng political biography to his alma mater, Ohio Wesleyan, to promote international study and travel. The university estimated the contribution to be over $500,000.

Vogel served as National Intelligence Officer for East Asia with the National Intelligence Council from 1993 to 1995. In 1999, when American forces bombed the Chinese Embassy in Belgrade, Vogel was reported by The Guardian as saying that it was not credible that the embassy was bombed by mistake when the C.I.A. used old maps. He later added "I find it hard to believe that anyone would consciously do such a thing and certainly not as a matter of policy. On the other hand I don't find it hard to believe that a massive mistake happened with a series of pitfalls and miscues adding up to disaster."

Starting in 2000, Vogel organized a series of conferences between Chinese, Japanese, and Western scholars to work together to examine World War II in East Asia; his intent was to promote reconciliation among the countries and support politicians who wanted to solve the lingering problems from that era. One of the resulting conference volumes was China at War: Regions of China, 1937–1945 (2007), co-edited with Stephen R. Mackinnon and Diana Lary.

== Publications ==
In a statistical overview derived from writings by and about Ezra Vogel, OCLC/WorldCat returns 150+ works in 400+ publications in 12 languages and 14,900+ library holdings.

=== Selected books and edited volumes ===
- A Modern Introduction to the Family (1960), with Norman W. Bell OCLC 902035798
- ——— (1963), Japan's New Middle Class: the Salary Man and his Family in a Tokyo Suburb, Berkeley: University of California Press. 2nd ed. 1971. On Internet Archive.
- Canton under Communism; Programs and Politics in a Provincial Capital, 1949–1968 (1969) ISBN 9780674094758
- Modern Japanese Organization and Decision-making (1975) ISBN 9780520028579
- Japan as Number One: Lessons for America (1979) ISBN 9781583484104
- Comeback, Case by Case : Building the Resurgence of American Business (1985) ISBN 9780671460792
- Ideology and National Competitiveness: an Analysis of Nine Countries (1987) ISBN 9780071032513
- One Step Ahead in China: Guangdong under Reform. (1989) ISBN 9780674639119
- Chinese Society on the Eve of Tiananmen: The Impact of Reform. (1990), with Deborah Davis ISBN 9780674125353
- The Four Little Dragons: The Spread of Industrialization in East Asia (1993 ISBN 9780674315266) The 1990 Edwin O. Reischauer Lectures
- Living with China : U.S./China Relations in the Twenty-First Century. (1997) ISBN 9780393317343
- Is Japan Still Number One? (2000) ISBN 9789679787283
- The Golden Age of the U.S.-China-Japan Triangle, 1972–1989 (2002), with Ming Yuan and Akihiko Tanaka ISBN 9780674009608
- China at War : Regions of China, 1937–1945 (2007), with Stephen R. Mackinnon, Diana Lary ISBN 978-0-8047-5509-2
- Deng Xiaoping and the Transformation of China (2011) ISBN 978-0-674-05544-5
- The Park Chung Hee Era : The Transformation of South Korea (2011) ISBN 9780674058200
- China and Japan: Facing History (2019) ISBN 9780674916579

=== Edited Translations ===
Yu Guangyuan; Levine, Steven I. & Ezra, Vogel F. with an introduction by Ezra Vogel. Deng Xiaoping Shakes the World: An Eyewitness Account of China's Party Work Conference and the Third Plenum. Norwalk: EastBridge, 2004.

=== Selected articles ===
- ——— (1960). "The Marital Relationship of Parents of Emotionally Disturbed Children: Polarization and Isolation". Psychiatry. 23 (1): 1–12. doi:10.1080/00332747.1960.11023198.
- ——— (1960). "The Emotionally Disturbed Child as a Family Scapegoat". Psychoanalysis and the Psychoanalytic Review. 47 (2): 5–14. PMID 5192296.
- Bell, Norman, Albert Trieschman and Ezra Vogel (1961). "A Sociocultural Analysis of the Resistances of Working-Class Fathers Treated in a Child Psychiatric Clinic". American Journal of Orthopsychiatry. 31 (2): 388–405. doi:10.1111/j.1939-0025.1961.tb02136.x.
- ——— (1961). "The Democratization of Family Relations in Japanese Urban Society". Asian Survey. 1 (4): 18–24. doi:10.2307/3023555. JSTOR 3023555.
- ——— (1961). "The Go-between in a Developing Society: The Case of the Japanese Marriage Arranger". Human Organization. 20 (3): 112–120. doi:10.17730/humo.20.3.w785jx286r2536w4.
- Rothenberg, Albert and Ezra F. Vogel (1964). "Patient Cliques and the Therapeutic Community". British Journal of Medical Psychology. 37 (2): 143–152. doi:10.1111/j.2044-8341.1964.tb01982.x. PMID 14191882.
- ——— (1965). "From Friendship to Comradeship: The Change in Personal Relations in Communist China". The China Quarterly (London). 21 (21): 46–60. doi:10.1017/S0305741000048463. S2CID 247326035.
- ——— (1967). "From Revolutionary to Semi-Bureaucrat: The "Regularisation" of Cadres". The China Quarterly (London). 29 (29): 36–60. doi:10.1017/S0305741000047901. S2CID 154354933.
- ——— (1992). "Japanese-American Relations after the Cold War". Daedalus (Cambridge, Mass.). 121 (4): 35–60.
- Bianco, Lucien, Jonathan Unger and Ezra Vogel (1993). "Universities Service Centre: The Chinese University of Hong Kong". China Information. 8 (3): 82. doi:10.1177/0920203X9300800311. S2CID 147532530.
- ——— (2004). "China as Number One a Harvard Professor Warns Japan That It Needs to Respond to China's Rise as a World Economic Power: Fortune Asia Edition". Fortune International. 150 (11): 71.
- ——— (2004). "The Rise of China and the Changing Face of East Asia". Asia-Pacific Review. 11 (1): 46–57. doi:10.1080/13439000410001687742. S2CID 154713229.
- ——— (2006). "Some Reflections on Policy and Academics". Asia Policy. 1 (1): 31–34. doi:10.1353/asp.2006.0013. S2CID 155059154.
- ——— (2008). "Lucian Pye, 1921–2008". The China Quarterly (London). 196 (196): 912–918. doi:10.1017/S0305741008001288. S2CID 153435201.
- ——— (2012). "Robert Scalapino (1919–2011)". The China Quarterly (London). 209 (209): 217–221. doi:10.1017/S030574101100155X.
- ——— (2013). "Suggestions for Improving Sino-Japanese Relations". Asia-Pacific Review. 20 (2): 160–162. doi:10.1080/13439006.2013.868396. S2CID 153919765.
- ——— (2019). "Roderick Lemonde Macfarquhar, 1930–2019". The China Quarterly (London). 238: 291–308. doi:10.1017/S0305741019000705.
