= Stefanie N. Vogel =

American physician-scientist and immunologist

- Born: October 16, 1951 (age 74); Washington, D.C., U.S.
- Other name: Stefanie Nucci Vogel
- Education: University of Maryland, College Park
- Scientific career
- Fields: Microbiology, immunology
- Workplaces: University of Maryland School of Medicine

Stefanie Nucci Vogel (born October 16, 1951) is an American physician-scientist, microbiologist, and immunologist. She is a professor of microbiology and immunology at the University of Maryland School of Medicine.

== Life ==
Vogel was born October 16, 1951, in Washington, D.C. She graduated from Regina High School in Hyattsville, Maryland, in 1968. From 1969 to 1972, Vogel was a part-time research assistant in the University of Maryland, College Park computer science center and the department of chemistry under James McDonald Stewart. She completed a B.S. with honors in the department of microbiology at the University of Maryland, College Park in January 1972. She was inducted into Phi Beta Kappa. From 1972 to 1974, Vogel was a microbiologist in the department of virus diseases at the Walter Reed Army Institute of Research.

Vogel was a graduate teaching assistant in the University of Maryland, College Park department of microbiology from 1974 to 1976. In 1976, she won a predoctoral fellowship from the American Association of University Women. Vogel earned a Ph.D. in immunology from the University of Maryland, College Park in May 1977. Her dissertation was titled, A study of the immune response of mice to type III pneumococcal polysaccharide as modified by phytohemagglutinin. Bob S. Roberson was her doctoral advisor. She was a postdoctoral fellow at the National Institute of Dental Research from 1977 to 1980.

In 2000, Vogel won a National Institutes of Health MERIT Award from the National Institute of Allergy and Infectious Diseases. In 2004, she was elected a fellow of the American Academy of Microbiology. She served as president of the International Endotoxin and Innate Immunity Society from 2004 to 2006. In 2011, she was elected a Fellow of the American Association for the Advancement of Science. Vogel is a professor of microbiology and immunology at the University of Maryland School of Medicine. She holds a secondary appointment as a professor of medicine.

Vogel is married to Richard L. Vogel, Jr.
