= Johann Christian Stark (the Elder) =

German physician and obstetrician

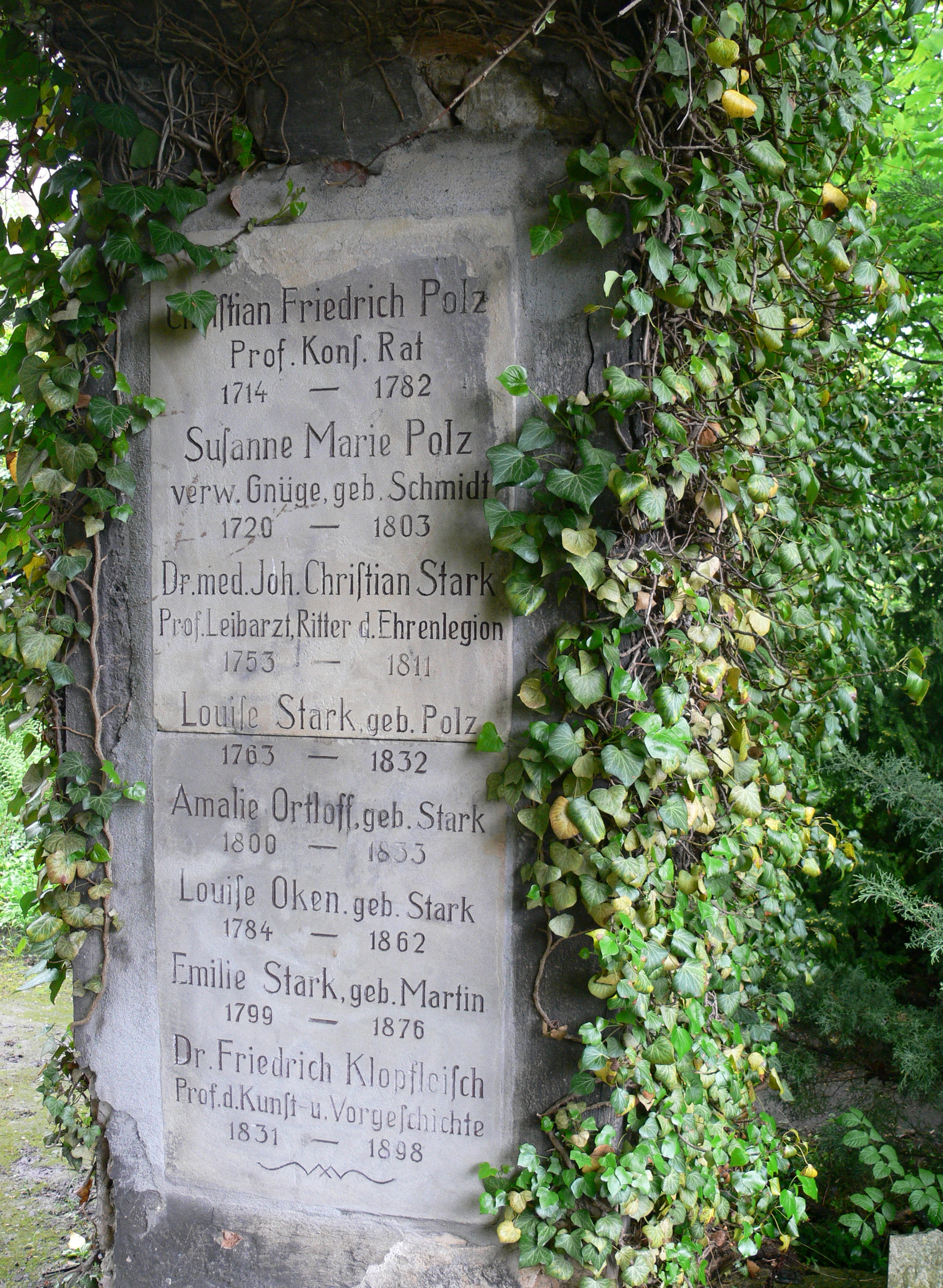
Jena Johannisfriedhof Polz Stark Klopfleisch

Johann Christian Stark (13 January 1753 – 11 January 1811) was a German physician and obstetrician born in Oßmannstedt. His nephew, also named Johann Christian Stark (1769–1837), was a noted obstetrician.

He earned his doctorate in 1777 from the University of Jena, where in 1779 he became an associate professor. At Jena he was director of a health institute and subdirector of maternity hospital services.

Known as an outstanding clinical teacher, one of his better-known students was Adam Elias von Siebold (1775–1828). He was a physician to the Weimar Ducal Court, in particular Anna Amalia and Carl August of Saxe-Weimar-Eisenach. He was also the doctor of Johann Wolfgang von Goethe and Friedrich Schiller.

In 1787 he became editor of the first obstetric-gynecological journal, Archivs für Geburtshilfe, Frauenzimmer und Neugeborener Kinder Krankheiten. He also published works in the fields of pharmacology and pediatrics, and was the author of a treatise on the history of tetanus. In addition, he is credited with making modifications to a number of obstetrical instruments and devices.
