= Wolfgang Vogel (mathematician) =

German mathematician

- Born: 8 February 1940; Bremen, Germany
- Died: 2 October 1996 (aged 56); Palmerston North, New Zealand
- Education: Martin Luther University of Halle-Wittenberg
- Scientific career
- Fields: Mathematician
- Workplaces: Martin Luther University of Halle-Wittenberg; Massey University

Wolfgang Vogel (8 February 1940 – 2 October 1996) was a German mathematician who made contributions to commutative algebra and algebraic geometry.

== Biography ==
In 1968 Vogel became a mathematics student at the Halle University. After finishing his degree in 1963 he worked as research scientist at the universities of Halle, Berlin and Innsbruck. In 1965 he received his Ph.D. in Halle. He was appointed to the teaching staff (Habilitation) in 1968. He was chairman of the department of pure mathematics from 1977 to 1991. In 1993 he was appointed Professor of Pure Mathematics, at Massey University. He died of cancer in Palmerston North at the age of 56.

== Selected publications ==
- Stückrad, J; Vogel, W (1986). Buchsbaum rings and applications : an interaction between algebra, geometry, and topology. Berlin New York: Springer-Verlag. ISBN 3-540-16844-3. OCLC 14002337.
- Flenner, H; O'Carroll, Liam; Vogel, W (1999). Joins and intersections. Berlin New York: Springer. ISBN 3-540-66319-3. OCLC 42291085.
