= Bruce Vogel =

American politician

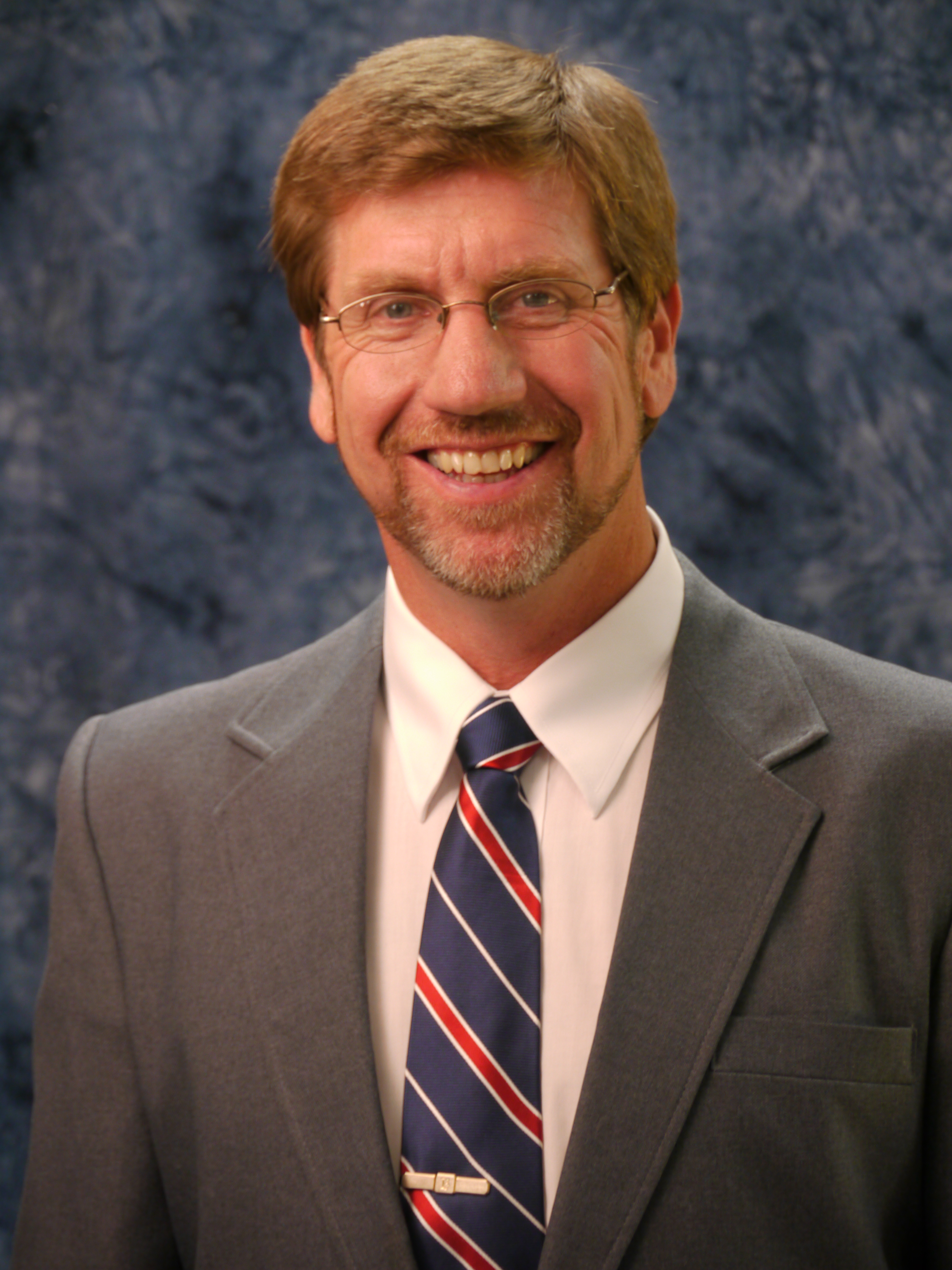

Member of the Minnesota House of Representatives from the 13B district
- In office January 4, 2011 – January 7, 2013
- Preceded by: Al Juhnke
- Succeeded by: district redrawn

Personal details
- Born: December 24, 1958 (age 67) Slayton, Minnesota, U.S.
- Party: Republican
- Spouse: Jeanne
- Children: 4
- Education: Alexandria Vocational-Technical Institute; Bethel College
- Profession: real estate agent, legislator

Bruce Vogel (born December 24, 1958) is a Minnesota politician and former member of the Minnesota House of Representatives representing District 13B, which included portions of Kandiyohi County in the west central part of the state, including the cities of Willmar, New London, Spicer, Atwater, Pennock, Kandiyohi, Prinsburg, Lake Lillian, Blomkest and Raymond.

A Republican, he was elected in the 2010 general election, unseating Democrat Al Juhnke, and assumed office on January 4, 2011. He was defeated in the 2012 general election by Democratic-Farmer-Labor Party member Mary Sawatzky. While in the legislature he served on the Agriculture and Rural Development Policy and Finance, Higher Education Policy and Finance, Judiciary Policy and Finance, and Transportation Policy and Finance committees.

Vogel travelled to the US Capitol on 6 January 2021 to take part in President Trump's rally to stop the peaceful transition of power.

Minnesota House of Representatives
Preceded by Al Juhnke	State Representative - District 13B; 2011-present	Succeeded by district redrawn
