= Eduard Vogel =

19th-century German explorer (1829–1856)

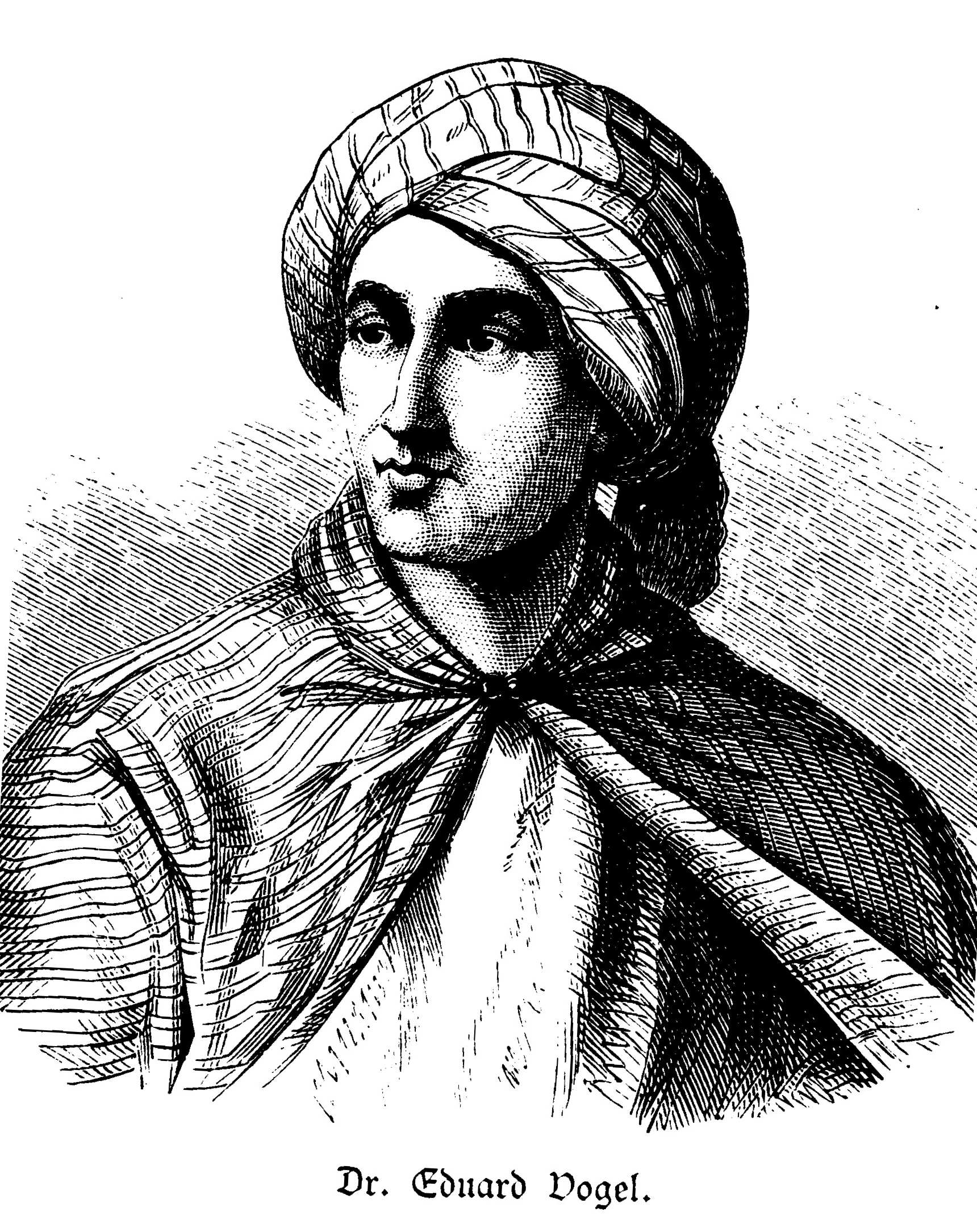
Eduard Vogel

Eduard Vogel (7 March 1829 – February 1856) was a German explorer in Central Africa.

== Early career ==
Vogel was born in Krefeld. He studied mathematics, botany and astronomy at Leipzig and Berlin, studying with Encke at the latter institution. In 1851, he was engaged as assistant astronomer to director John Russell Hind at George Bishop's private observatory in London. That year August Heinrich Petermann introduced Vogel to the Royal Geographical Society.

== Africa commission ==
In 1853 Petermann arranged for Vogel to be chosen by the British government to join the Richardson, Overweg and Barth expedition with supplies. That expedition had been sent to Africa in 1849 to find a trade route that bypassed the Arabs. Vogel was to be a replacement for Richardson who had died two years earlier and was tasked to make geographical and meteorological observations and to collect botanical specimens. In 1853, the expedition was in the western Sudan.

Vogel sailed from England on 20 February 1853. The day Vogel left London, news had arrived that Overweg had also died, leaving Barth on his own.

== Meeting Barth ==
On 25 July, Vogel left Tripoli with a caravan to catch up with Barth. Vogel arrived at the end of the Trans-Saharan trade route, Kuka, the capital of Bornu on 13 January 1854. Vogel's specimens, and the fact that both expedition engineers were soldiers, made the king there suspicious of his intentions, and Vogel's movements were severely restricted.

Instead of waiting for Barth to return, on 19 July, Vogel joined a steamboat expedition heading up the Niger and Benue Rivers to the Mandara Mountains where he was imprisoned by the king of Mora who had received a message about the suspicious stranger from Bornu. Vogel eventually escaped to Marghi in Nigeria where he waited for news of Barth. Upon hearing of a change of king in Bornu, Vogel returned to wait for Barth, whom he met December 1854.

By some accounts Vogel was disliked by the other members of the expedition due to his poor attitude, difficult personality and unwillingness to learn Arabic, the lingua franca of north Africa. The arrival of Barth helped defuse some of the conflict, although one of the two engineers refused to travel any further while Vogel was part of the expedition. Barth himself contemplated getting rid of Vogel and stealing his equipment.

== Further exploration ==
Vogel left Barth, and taking one engineer and four servants headed for Bauchi where he ingratiated himself with the Emir by killing a man the Emir disliked. He then became the first European to cross the Muri Mountains angering the Tangale people in the process as he desecrated their shrines by sleeping in them during the journey. He penetrated south to the upper course of the Benue, returning to Kuka 1 December 1855. From this date, the notes of his expedition cease.

== Death ==
Vogel left Kuka for the Nile Valley, leaving his engineer, MacGuire, with his notes and specimen collections. Vogel got as far as Wadai (also spelled Ouaddai) in southern Sudan. MacGuire may have known of Vogel's fate but was killed by brigands while returning to Tripoli. Several search expeditions were organized to ascertain Vogel's fate and to recover his papers, but it was not until 1873 that Gustav Nachtigal, on reaching Wadai, learnt of the circumstances of Vogel's February 1856 death in Wara, the capital of Wadai.

Nachtigal's account was that Vogel's odd habit of existing almost solely on eggs and writing with a pencil rather than the expected ink was of concern to the Sultan's advisors who had advised the Sultan to kill him "just in case". The sultan was hesitant but Vogel then climbed Mount Treya which was sacred and off limits to all but the highest officials. Vogel was beaten to death by Kubartu with iron tipped cudgels. According to Nachtigal, Kubartu were a Wadai clan consisting of musicians and executioners.

== Family ==
His sister Elise Vogel Polko was a popular German novelist. She published his notes in her Erinnerungen an einen Verschollenen (1863). Another resource is Adolf Pahde's Der Afrikaforscher Eduard Vogel. Hamburg, 1889 (first published Krefeld, 1886).
