= Elise Polko =

German singer and novelist (1823–1899)

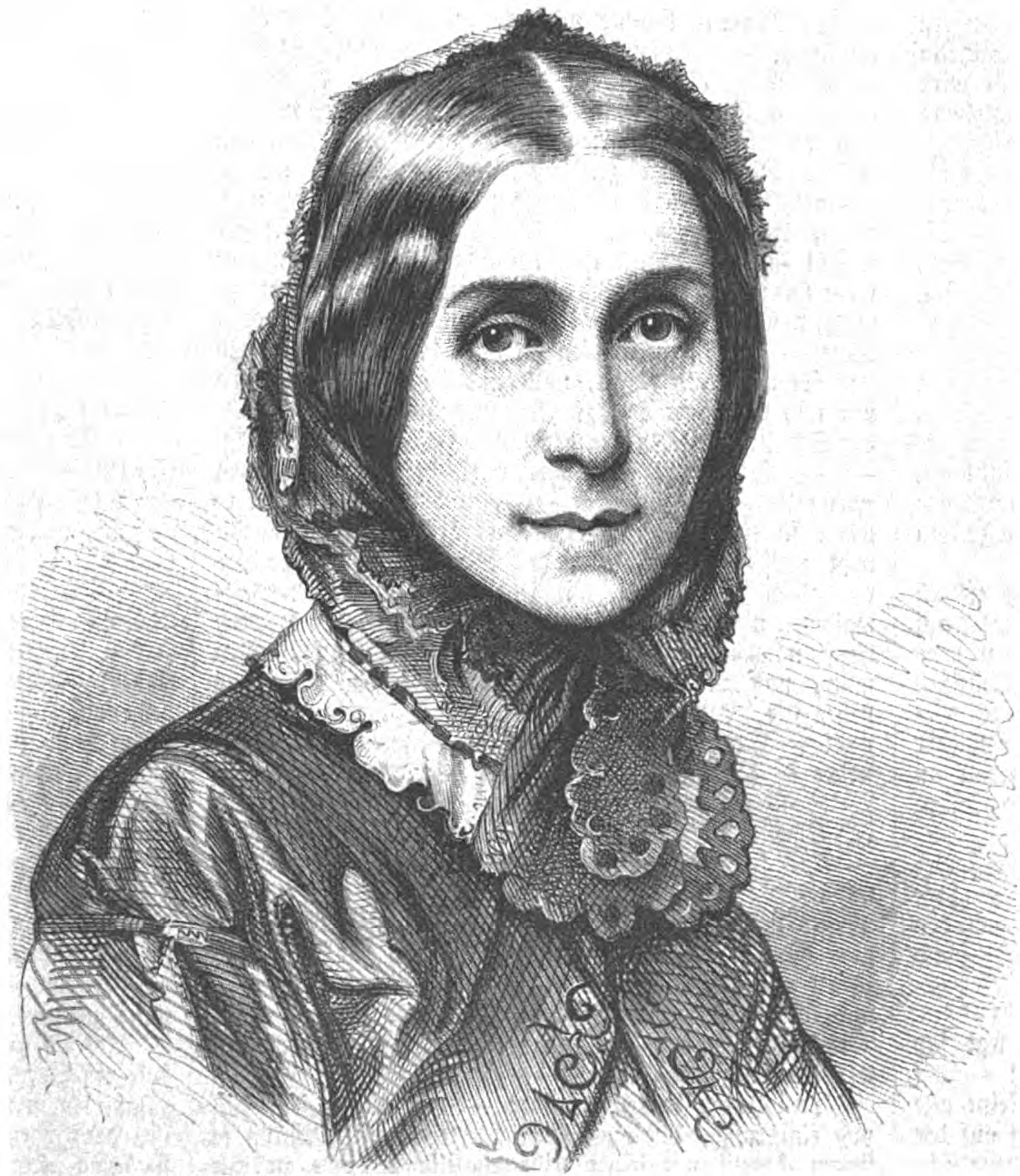
Elise Polko in 1870

Emilie Charlotte Elise Polko, née Vogel (31 January 1823 in Leipzig or in Schloß Wackerbarth 'Wackerbarthsruhe' castle, Radebeul, Dresden, Kingdom of Saxony – 15 May 1899 in Munich, German Empire) was a German singer and novelist.

== Biography ==
=== Early life ===
Elise Vogel was the first child of principal Karl Christoph Vogel and his wife Amalie Lang, who, together with his father-in-law Carl Lang, ran the boys' boarding school established in 1816 in Wackerbarths Ruh' castle near Dresden. In 1824, the family moved to Krefeld, where her father ran the Höhere Stadtschule (later Realgymnasium) until 1832. After 1832, the family moved to Leipzig. There, in addition to a careful education, she also received music lessons from the music director Christian August Pohlenz and the singing professor Friedrich Böhme.

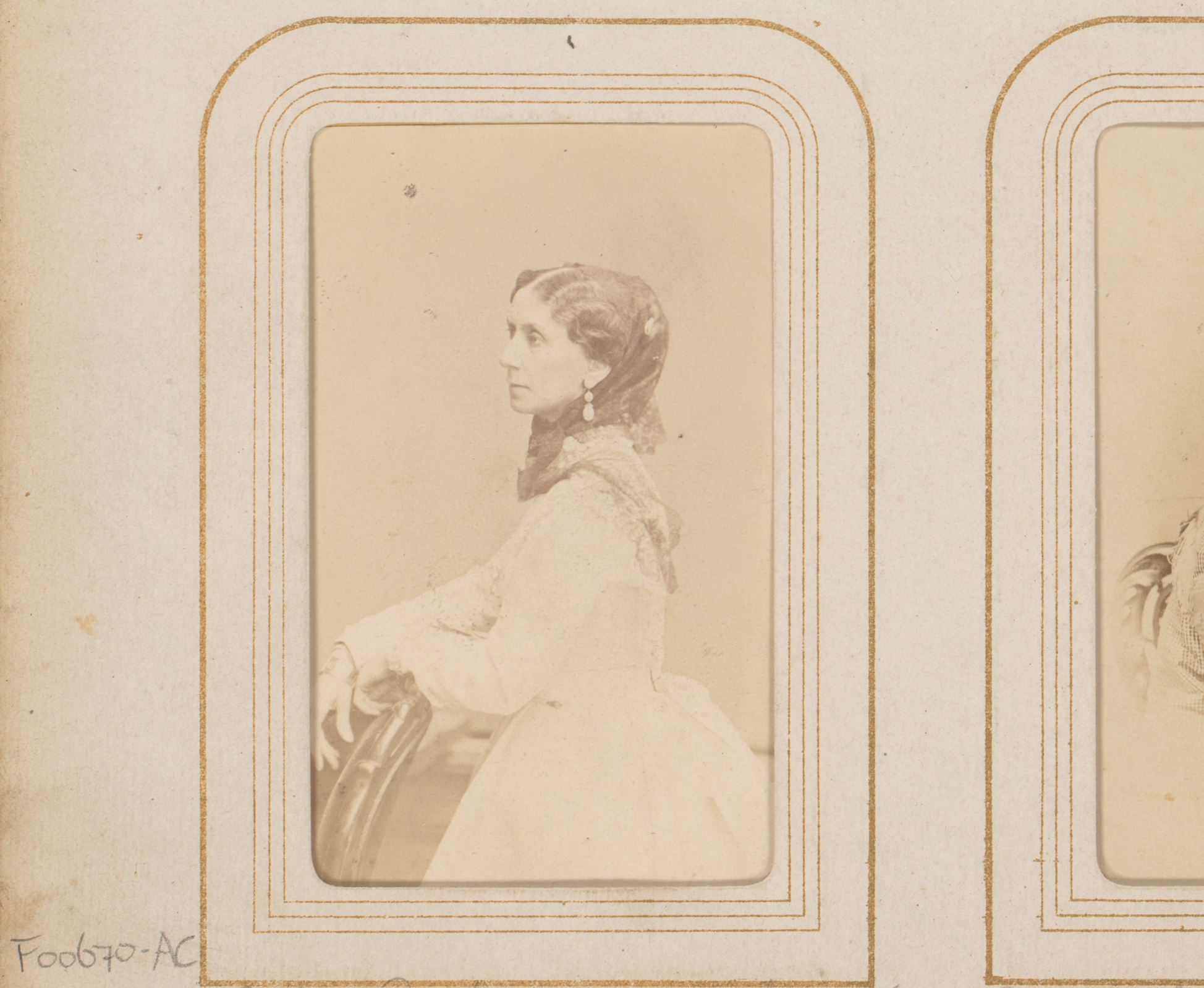
Elise Polko, carte-de-visite photo, album leaf c. 1855-1870

She attained considerable fame as a public and opera singer, she performed in Leipzig, Dresden, Halle and Berlin. Her younger brother, Eduard Vogel, became a renowned astronomer and African explorer and was executed in 1856 in the Sultanate of Wadei, east of Lake Chad, on the orders of the local ruler. The youngest brother, astrophyscist Hermann Carl Vogel, became director of the Astrophysical Observatory at the University of Potsdam.

=== Singing career ===
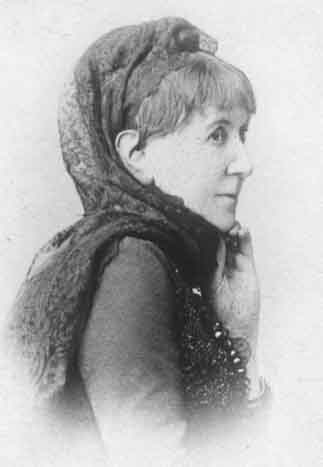
Elise Polko in 1891

Elise Vogel was one of Felix Mendelssohn Bartholdy's friends; she was taken in by Mendelssohn's sister, Fanny Hensel. This circle also included Jenny Lind, Wilhelmine Schröder-Devrient, and Rahel Varnhagen von Ense. Polko's voice and her talent aroused Mendelssohn's interest, who supported her as well as Livia Frege. On Mendelssohn's advice, she trained as a singer (mezzo-soprano). She made her first public appearance as a singer on October 18, 1845, at the Leipzig Gewandhaus. She also tried her hand successfully as an opera singer; in December 1847, she went to Paris to complete her vocal studies with Manuel García. Her plan to go on stage was thwarted by changing family circumstances. After the outbreak of the February Revolution in 1848, she returned to Leipzig and performed for the last time at a subscription concert in the Leipzig Gewandhaus on 24 February 1848.

=== Marriage and after ===
In 1849, she gave up a career as a singer and married in June Eduard Polko, a railway engineer and later railway director of the Cologne-Minden Railway Company. She devoted herself to literature where she proved to be equally successful. Her work Musikalische Märchen earned critical praise.

She lived with her husband in Duisburg, from around 1851/1852 for about 25 years in Minden in Westphalia, where they moved into an apartment in the train station, from 1877 in Wetzlar and in 1880 in Cologne borough of Deutz. In February 1887, shortly after the death of her terminally ill son Walter, her husband also died – leaving behind debts. In addition, her husband had failed to include her in the pension insurance when the railway company was nationalized. And she had to support her family. At first she lived in Hanover, which she had to leave again for health reasons, from 1891 in Wiesbaden, from where she moved to Frankfurt in 1895 for financial reasons, and finally she lived in Munich from 1898. She received a small pension through grace, earned her living by writing and by taking in mostly older pensioners, including, for a time, a young daughter of the poet Theodor Storm, and gave singing lessons. She was also supported with financial gifts and loans by Marianne Rhodius, who, in addition to numerous legacies, left 1.8 million marks to the city of Krefeld as a foundation. In the summer of 1898, she fell so badly in Schliersee that she died of the consequences of this accident on May 15, 1899, in Munich at the home of her sister Julie Dohmke.

== Literary work ==
Her Musikalische Märchen (Musical tales; 1852) was translated into English, as were others of her books. She published Ein Frauenleben (A woman's life; 1854), Erinnerungen an Felix Mendelssohn Bartholdy (Recollections of Felix Mendelssohn; 1868), Aus dem Jahre 1870, Conversations (1872), Neues Märchenbuch (1884), and other works.

Elise Polko's works were mostly created in Minden, where she also met lawyer Carl Wilhelm August Krüger (1797–1868), who had assembled a well-known art collection. In her book Bedeutende Menschen. Portraitskizzen, Lebenserinnerungen und Novellen ("Important People: Portrait Sketches, Memories and Novellas") from 1895, she recounts a story by the art collector. However, Polko's themes mostly came from the field of music. Her best-known works are the novels Erinnerungen an Felix Mendelssohn Bartholdy, Faustina Hasse, Nicolo Paganini und die Geigenbauer ("Recollections of Felix Mendelssohn Bartholdy, Faustina Hasse, Nicolo Paganini and the Violin Makers" and Musikalische Märchen, Phantasien und Skizzen ("Musical Fairy Tales, Fantasies and Sketches") in three volumes – a work that went through 25 editions (23 of which were published until her death) and was first published between 1847 and 1850 in the magazine Signale für die musikalische Welt ("Signals for the Musical World"). The three volumes Musikalische Märchen ("Musical Fairy Tales") tell stories from the past and present from the musical life of past centuries. They are recollections of famous musicians. In the story Ein Doppelstern am Kunsthimmel ("A Double Star in the Art Sky") Clara and Robert Schumann play the main roles. And in "Porpoto in Dresden 1744," readers are transported to the court of Frederick Augustus II, the son of Augustus the Strong.

These works were mostly very successful and were read with great enthusiasm, especially by women. Nevertheless, Elise Polko could not escape her financially constrained circumstances, even though she wrote almost nonstop to pay off loans. In a letter to Marianne Rhodius, she complained: "Given the popularity of my pen and the ease with which I work, as an English or French writer I would have been able to fulfill the aforementioned expensive obligations without great effort, but the fees of German writers are so low compared to those – and so I have to suffer honestly, and almost all of those works, dear lady, which so many hearts rejoice in, bear the secret motto 'in doloribus pinxit' (painted in pain)." She was also unlucky in her choice of publishers, who went bankrupt, so she had to buy back her books.

Today, her works are little known and mostly available only in secondhand bookshops; However, many works are available as digital copies, and the Berlin State Library holds many original editions of Elise Polko's works. A detailed bibliography of her works, essays, and short stories can be found in the Westfälisches Autorenlexikon (Westphalian Authors' Encyclopedia). Further material can be found in the Krefeld City Archives.
