= Johann Vogel (poet) =

German poet and Lutheran minister (1589–1663)

Johann Vogel (1589–1663) was a German poet and Lutheran minister. Born in Nuremberg, he published an emblem book entitled Meditationes emblematicae de restaurata pace Germaniae, or Emblematic Meditations on the Restored Peace of Germany (1649), designed to convince a wide audience to accept the terms of the Peace of Westphalia.
