= John W. Vogel =

American minstrel show manager

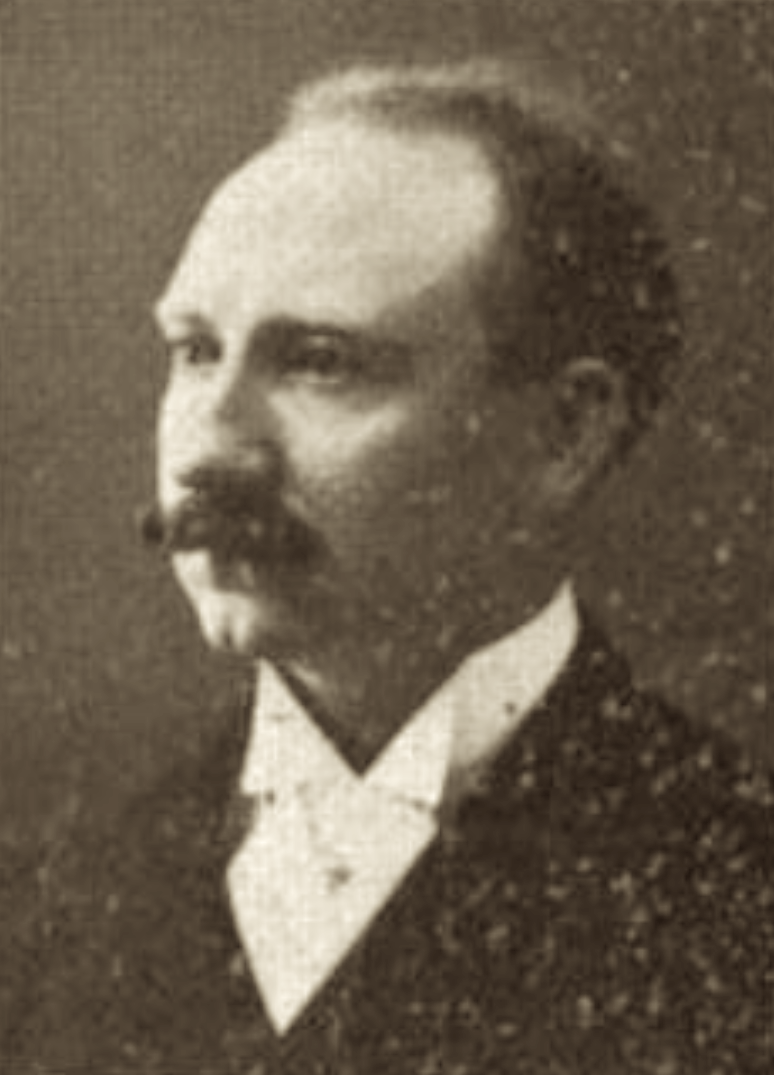
John W. Vogel

John W. Vogel (May 16, 1863 – January 1, 1951) was an American manager and owner of African-American minstrel companies in the United States.

By the end of the 19th century, Vogel was a prominent non-playing manager. He continued to run minstrel companies after many other companies had dissolved. By 1901, Vogel had been proclaimed the "Minstrel King" by commentators of that era.

== Early career ==
Vogel was born in Chillicothe, Ohio, on May 16, 1863.

Vogel's first entertainment business job was with the Sells Brothers' “Millionaire Confederation of Stupendous Shows” circus in 1882. That same year, he became the assistant agent for "Thatcher, Primrose and West's Minstrels" in Cleveland, Ohio. He was soon promoted to manager of that show.

In 1887, Vogel managed the "McIntyre and Heath Minstrels" from Kenosha, Wisconsin for one year. He later managed the "McNish, Johnson and Slavin's"; "Mcnish, Ramza and Arno's"; "Primrose and West'"s and "McIntyre and Heath's "companies.

== Vogel companies ==
Vogel owned and managed the "Vogel's Afro-American Mastodon Minstrels". His "John W. Vogel's Big City Minstrels" company toured for more than 12 seasons. Vogel also managed the "Al. G. Field Minstrels" for seven years. “In 1898, the "John W. Vogel’s Concert Company "was considered “the greatest band of colored musicians in America”.

In 1897, Alfred Griffith Hatfield leased his Darkest America Company, a black musical drama, after its second season to Vogel, who took full control of it the following year.

A review from an 1897 daily paper provides a summarial description of 1890s plantation minstrelsy through description of the show:

“In Darkest America” as presented... by Mr. John Vogel's large and in every way meritorious company, was perhaps the best presentation of scenes intended to be depicted, taking the performance in all its details, that could be exhibited. The actors are in the main colored people, and from the fidelity which the scenes of the plantation in slavery times are produced, one would be justified in imagining that they had all served at least a liberal apprenticeship among the slaves of the past.”.

Vogel owned a winter home in Columbus, Ohio and a summer home on Vogel's Beach, Buckeye Lake, Ohio.
