= Achmad Yurianto =

Indonesian military doctor (1962–2022)

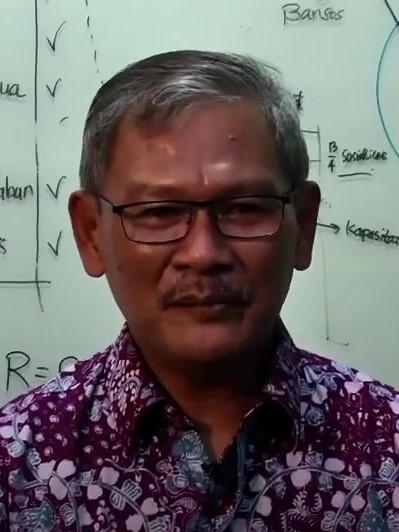

Director General for Disease Prevention and Control
- In office 9 March 2020 – 23 October 2020
- Minister: Terawan Agus Putranto
- Preceded by: Anung Sugihantono
- Succeeded by: Maxi Rein Rondonuwu

Spokesperson to the COVID-19 Response Acceleration Task Force
- In office 3 March 2020 – 24 July 2020
- Chairman: Doni Monardo
- Preceded by: office established
- Succeeded by: Wiku Adisasmito

Personal details
- Born: 11 March 1962 Malang, Indonesia
- Died: 21 May 2022 (aged 60) Malang, Indonesia
- Education: Airlangga University

Military service
- Allegiance: Indonesia
- Branch/service: Indonesian Army
- Years of service: 1988–2015
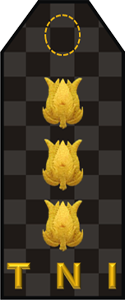
- Rank: Colonel
- Unit: Health (CKM)

Achmad Yurianto (11 March 1962 – 21 May 2022) was an Indonesian military doctor and bureaucrat who was appointed the spokesperson to the COVID-19 Response Acceleration Task Force during the early days of the COVID-19 pandemic in Indonesia. He was also the Director General for Disease Prevention and Control during this time.

== Early life and education ==
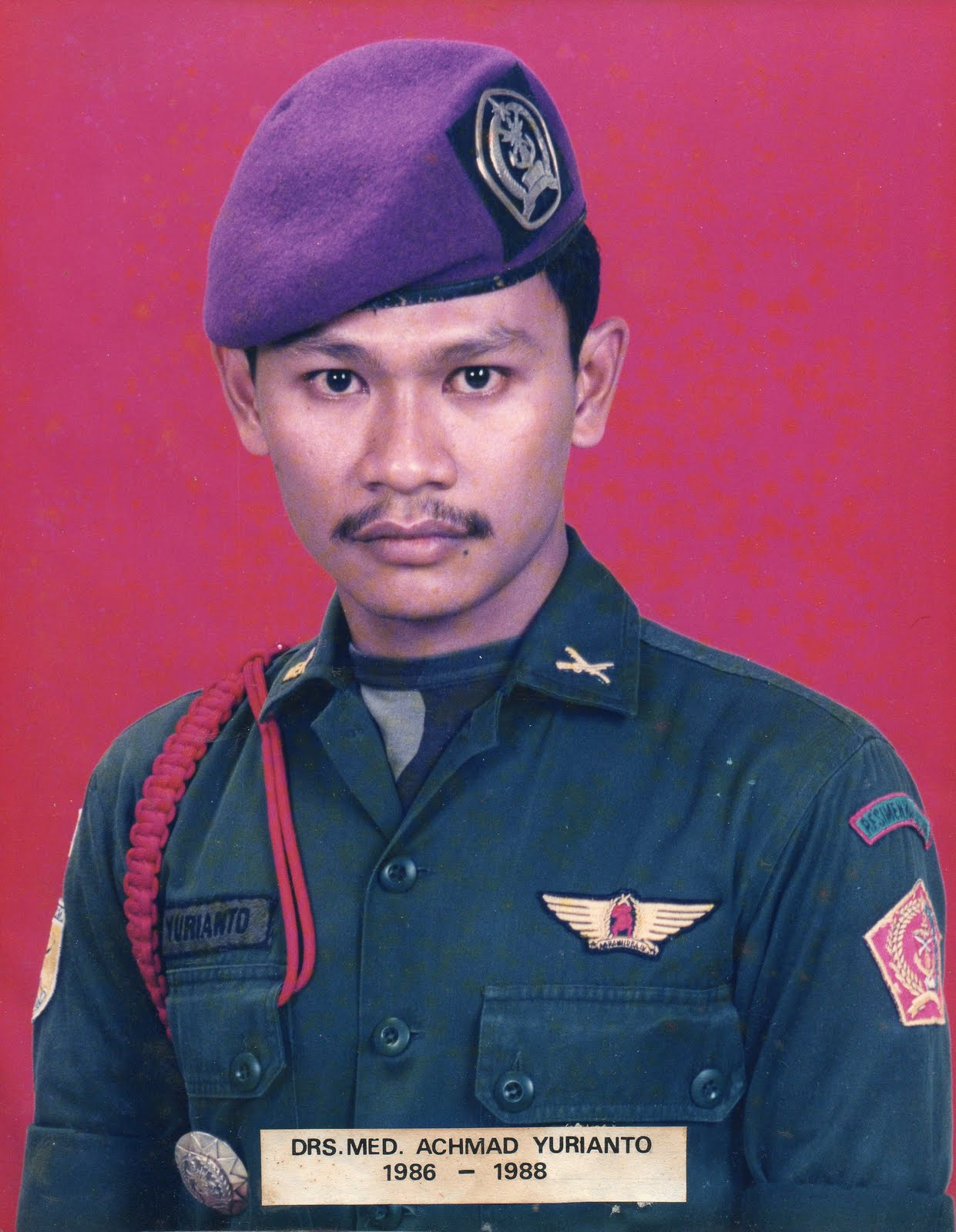
Yurianto as the commander of the Airlangga University Student Regiment

Yurianto was born on 11 March 1962 in Malang, East Java. His parents later moved to another city, but he returned to Malang at the age of nine and lived by himself. He later attended Airlangga University and became the commander of the university's student regiment from 1986 until 1988. He graduated from the university in 1990 with an undergraduate degree in medicine.

== Military career ==
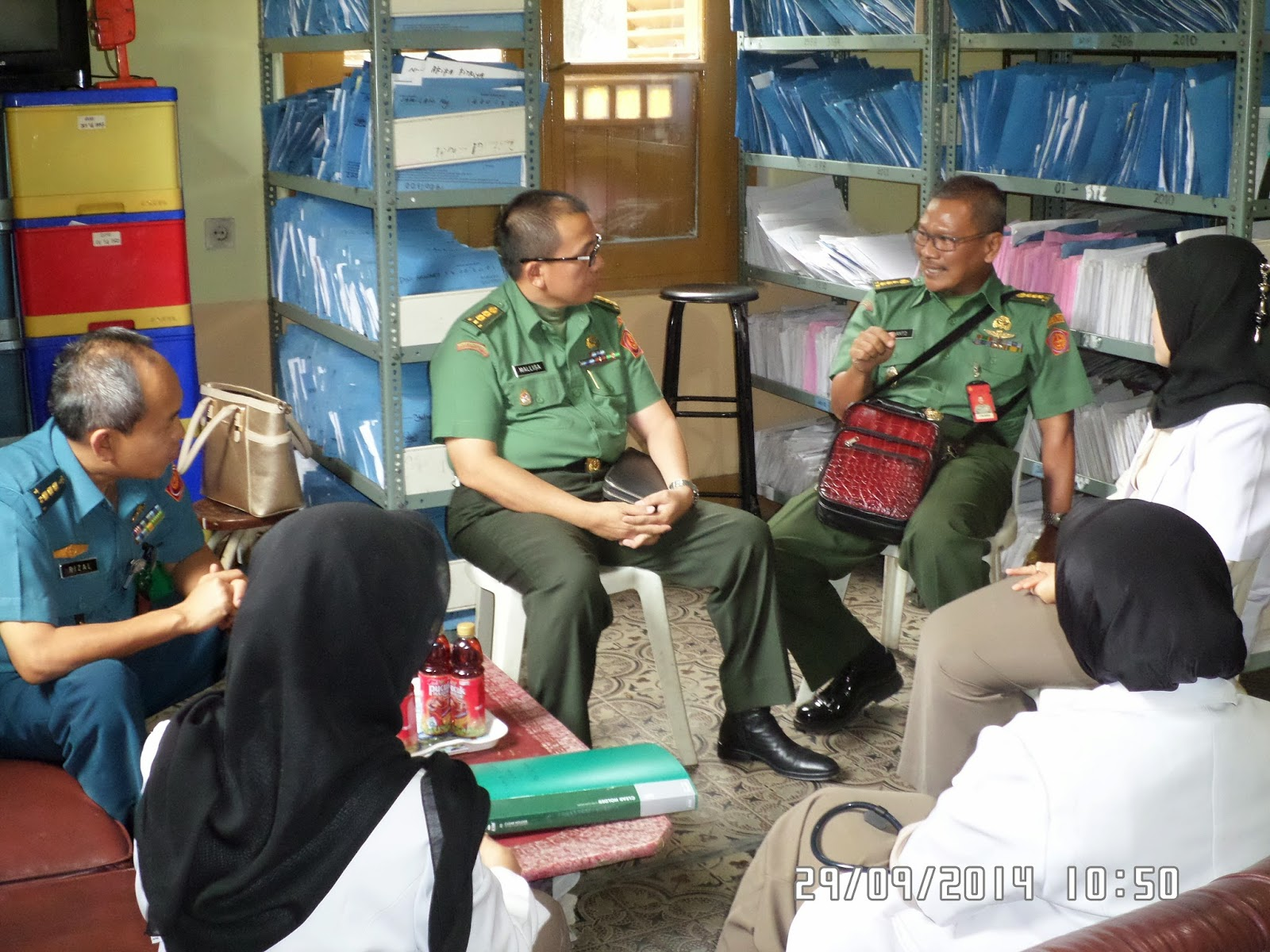
Yurianto (wearing red bag) inspecting a military health clinic in 2014

Yurianto entered the military shortly after graduation. He started his career as a military doctor in the Brawijaya (East Java) Regional Military Command. He was later transferred to the Udayana (Bali and Nusa Tenggara) Regional Military Command in 1990 and become the military doctor of an infantry battalion in East Timor during the Indonesian occupation of East Timor. He was then reassigned to the Regional Health Detachment in Dili, the capital of East Timor, in 1994, and to the Army Strategic Reserve Command in 1997. During his assignments in military, Yuri was sent to malaria-endemic provinces, where he had multiple bouts of malaria.

From 2000 to 2004, he taught at the Armed Forces Health Education Center and attained the rank of major, and later lieutenant colonel. He was sent to Papua to lead the Indonesian Army relief effort for the 2004 Nabire earthquake and established a field hospital in cooperation with the health ministry.

Following his stint as a lecturer, Yurianto was appointed the Commander of the Serang Regional Health Detachment. He became the Deputy Head of the Dustira Hospital in 2006, the deputy surgeon general of the Diponegoro (Central Java) Regional Military Command in 2009, and the surgeon general of the Pattimura (Maluku) Regional Military Command in 2011. He then became the Head of the Health Support Bureau in the Armed Forces Health Center, a post he held until his retirement from the military in 2014. He also became the deputy chairman of a health selection team for armed forces cadets around 2013.

== Ministry of Health ==
After his early retirement from the military, Yurianto entered the Ministry of Health and was installed as the head of the ministry's Health Crisis Response Center on 17 October 2014. About a year later, the center underwent a major restructuring by the health minister, and was renamed as the Health Crisis Center. Yurianto remained the center's head.

During the 2015 Southeast Asian haze, Yurianto led the distribution of health masks to the affected Indonesian provinces. Achmad remarked that most of the people with lung complications in the region refused to wear the N95 respirator masks provided by the government.

=== COVID-19 pandemic in Indonesia ===
Yurianto was appointed as the Secretary of the Directorate General for Disease Prevention and Control, the second highest office in the directorate general, on 6 August 2019. A few months later, the COVID-19 pandemic started and was declared as a Public Health Emergency of International Concern by the World Health Organization on 30 January 2020. Yurianto initially denied the existence of the virus in Indonesia, stating that the COVID-19 "was relatively tame in comparison to SARS and MERS". He was tasked by President Joko Widodo to lead the evacuation process of Indonesian citizens from Wuhan. Yurianto's popularity began to rise after the successful evacuation and Jokowi entrusted him to lead the evacuation process of the World Dream cruise ship. In the midst of the evacuation process, Joko Widodo summoned Yurianto to the presidential residence and immediately appointed him as the official government's spokesperson for COVID-19. A week later, Yurianto was promoted as the Director General for Disease Prevention and Control.

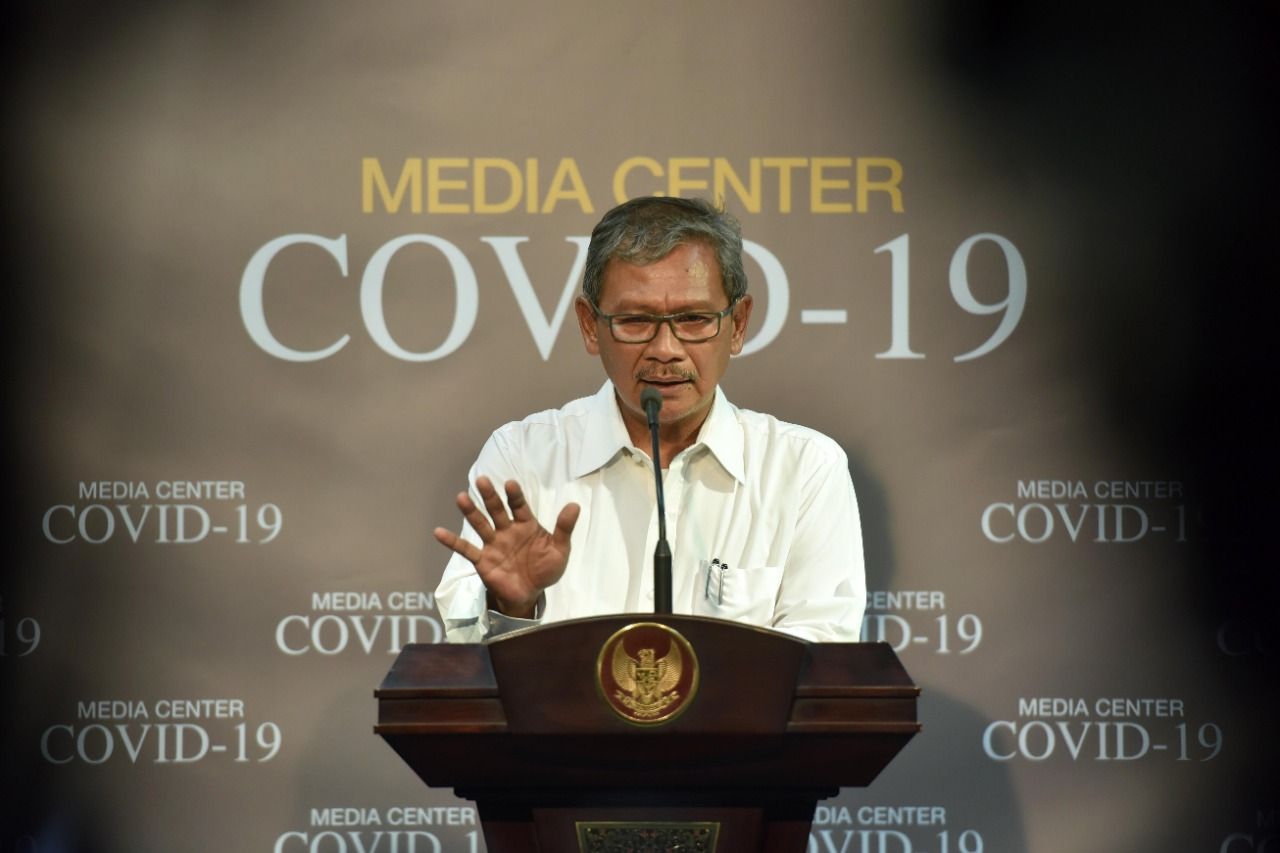
Yurianto at a press conference in March 2020

During his first days, Yurianto held daily press conferences at the executive office of the president. For about a month, Yurianto worked alone without any assistance or team, and most of the data that he used for press conferences were collected through his office in the Ministry of Health. However, his press conferences was later moved to the office of the National Board for Disaster Management and a team was assembled to help Yurianto in his press conferences. Arie Rukmantara, the UNICEF representative in West Java, became Yurianto's script writer, and Dr. Reisa Kartikasari assisted Yurianto in delivering pandemic reports. Other crews as well as volunteers helped Yurianto with the coordination of press pool, visual, timing, as well as the enforcement of health protocols. Yurianto's daily press conferences became so popular that the National Board for Disaster Management was crowded with people who wanted to see him live despite the regulations for social distancing at that time. Yurianto also earned the nickname of "bearer of death" due to his daily reports on COVID-19 related deaths.

Yurianto's face masks and batik shirts also became the center of attention during press conferences as he dressed up uniquely each time. An unofficial "bingo game" for his batik shirts was held by a number of reporters at the press pool. One of the batik shirts he wore, nicknamed the corona batik, although it was originally designed for World AIDS Day, became popular and was copied by various batik craftspeople.

The rich protect the poor so they can live a normal life and the poor protect the rich from spreading the disease. This is an important cooperation.

— Achmad Yurianto, 27 March 2020

During one of his press conference in late March 2020, Yurianto sparked controversy for mentioning the cooperation between "the poor and the rich" to end the pandemic. The statement was publicly condemned as discriminatory and the Indonesian Legal Aid Foundation feared that it could spark public anger due to the divisive dichotomy. Yurianto clarified his statement by using the relation between housemaids and homeowners as an allegory, but this escalated the controversy and Yurianto was accused of being "tendentious" and "insensitive" to the condition of housemaids during the pandemic.

Yurianto ended his tenure as a spokesperson for COVID-19 affairs on 21 July 2020 and was replaced by Wiku Adisasmito. The government ceased daily press briefings on the pandemic situation shortly afterward, and press conferences under Wiku Adisasmito were subsequently held on a weekly basis. Yurianto continued serving as director general until 23 October, when he was dismissed and became one of the health minister's expert staff. In February 2021, he also became the chairman of the supervisory board of the state's health insurance company BPJS Kesehatan. He held these two positions until his death in 2022.

== Personal life ==
Yurianto was married to Dwiretno Yuliarti and had two children. He was a photographer and a dollmaker in his spare time. His panoramic photos were purchased by travel agencies, and his paper dolls were displayed at the Jakarta International Handicraft Trade Fair.

== Death ==
Yurianto was diagnosed with intestinal cancer in April 2022 and was brought to the Gatot Soebroto Army Hospital for medical treatments. He underwent chemotherapy shortly afterward and was additionally diagnosed with multiple strokes. He was brought to his hometown in Malang a day before his death for home care treatment. After being treated for three days in the city hospital, Yurianto died on the evening on 21 May 2022. His body was brought to his parents' house before the burial on the following day with a full military ceremony at the Dadaprejo Public Cemetery in Batu, East Java.
