= Timeline of the COVID-19 pandemic in May 2020 =

Sequence of major events in a virus pandemic

This article documents the chronology and epidemiology of SARS-CoV-2 in May 2020, the virus which causes the coronavirus disease 2019 (COVID-19) and is responsible for the COVID-19 pandemic. The first human cases of COVID-19 were identified in Wuhan, China, in December 2019.

== Pandemic chronology ==
=== 1 May ===
WHO Situation Report 102:

- Australia reported a total of about 6,700 cases and 93 deaths.
- Azerbaijan reported a total of 1,804 cases and 24 deaths.
- China reported 12 new cases (including six imported cases), bringing the total number of cases to over 84,000.
- France reported 218 deaths, taking the total to 24,594. 25,887 remain in hospital and 3,878 in intensive care.
- Germany reported 1,639 new cases, bringing the total to 160,758. The country also reported 193 deaths, bringing the death toll to 6,481.
- Indonesia reported 433 new cases, bringing the total number to 10,551. Indonesian health authorities reported eight deaths, bringing the death toll to 800. Indonesia reported 1,591 recoveries and tested 76,500 people.
- Iran reported 63 new deaths, bringing the death toll to 6,091. Iran reported a total of 95,646 cases with 2,899 in critical condition.
- Italy reported 269 deaths, bringing the death toll to 28,236. Italy announced 1,965 new cases, bringing the total to 207,428.
- Malaysia reported 69 new cases (12 imported and 57 local transmissions), bringing the total number of cases to 6,071. Malaysian authorities also discharged 39 patients, bringing the number of recoveries to 4,210. Malaysia also reported a new death, bringing the country's death toll to 103.
- Mexico reported 1,425 new cases, bringing the total to 19,224. Mexico reported 127 new deaths, bringing the death toll to 1,859.
- The Netherlands reported 475 new cases, bringing the total to 39,791. Dutch authorities reported 98 new deaths, bringing the death toll to 4,893.
- New Zealand reported three new cases, bringing the total to 1,479 (1,132 confirmed and 347 probable). NZ health authorities also reported 11 new recoveries, bringing the total 1,252.
- The Philippines reported 284 new cases, bringing the total number to 8,772. The Philippines reported 11 new deaths, bringing the death toll to 579.
- Qatar reported 687 new cases, bringing the total number to 14,096. Qatar also reported two new deaths, bringing the death toll to 12. A total of 1,436 people had recovered.
- Russia reported 7,993 cases, bringing the total to 114,431. Russia reported 96 deaths, bringing the death toll to 1,169.
- Singapore reported 932 new cases, bringing the total to 17,101. Another death was later confirmed, bringing the total to 16.
- South Korea reported nine new cases, bringing the total to 10,774, of which 9,072 had recovered.
- Spain reported 281 deaths, bringing the death toll to 24,824. Spanish health authorities also reported 1,781 new cases, bringing the total number of cases to 215,216.
- Thailand reported six new cases, bringing the total number to 2,960. Thai authorities reported no new deaths, with the death toll remaining at 54.
- Turkey reported 84 deaths, bringing the death toll to 3,258. Turkey reported 2,188 cases, bringing the total to 122,392.
- Ukraine reported 455 new cases and 11 new deaths, bringing the total numbers to 10,861 and 272 respectively; a total of 1,413 patients had recovered.
- The United Kingdom reported 279 deaths, bringing the death toll to 27,510. Health Secretary Matt Hancock announced that UK health authorities conducted 122,347 tests, meeting its goal of testing 100,000 people.
- In the United States, the estimated total death toll from the coronavirus reached 63,000.
- Yemen reported one new case in the Taiz governorate, bringing the total number to seven. Yemen recorded a total of two deaths.
- According to Johns Hopkins University, there had been over 3.26 million cases, some 233,000 deaths, and more than one million recoveries.

=== 2 May ===
WHO Situation Report 103:

- The Africa Centres for Disease Control and Prevention (Africa CDC) confirmed that Africa recorded nearly 40,000 cases, nearly 1,700 deaths, and more than 13,000 recoveries. The coronavirus occurred in 53 African countries.
- Australia reported a total of nearly 6,800 cases and 93 deaths. Health authorities identified a new cluster around a meat processing factory in the state of Victoria.
- Brazil reported a total of 92,200 cases and 6,412 deaths.
- Fiji confirmed two recoveries.
- France reported 166 deaths, bringing the death toll to 24,760.
- Germany reported 954 cases, bringing the total to 161,703. Germany also reported 94 deaths, bringing the death toll to 6,575.
- Italy reported 474 deaths, bringing the death toll to 28,710. 1,539 remain in intensive care while 79,914 had recovered.
- Malaysia reported 105 new cases, bringing the total number to 6,176. In addition, 116 patients were discharged, bringing the total number of recovered to 4,326. The death toll remains at 103.
- The Netherlands reported 445 new cases, bringing the total to 40,236. The Dutch reported 94 new deaths, bringing the death toll to 4,987.
- New Zealand reported 6 new cases (2 confirmed and 4 probable), bringing the total to 1,485 (1,134 confirmed and 351 probable). NZ authorities also reported 11 new recoveries, bringing the total to 1,263. NZ also reported a new death, bringing the total to 20.
- The Philippines reported 156 new cases, bringing the total to 8,928. The Philippines reported 24 deaths, bringing the death toll to 603. 40 more people had recovered, bringing the total number of recovered to 1,124.
- Russia reported 9,623 cases, bringing the total to 124,054. Russia reported 57 deaths, bringing the death toll to 1,222. The Mayor of Moscow Sergei Sobyanin also announced that 2 percent of Moscow's population (roughly 250,000 people) had tested positive for the coronavirus.
- Singapore reported 447 new cases, bringing the total to 17,548. One death was later confirmed, bringing the total to 17. Another person was later confirmed to have COVID-19 after he died, with the death caused by a heart attack.
- South Korea reported six new cases, bringing the total to 10,780. The country reported two new deaths, bringing the death toll to 250. 72 people had recovered, bringing the total to 9,123.
- Spain reported 276 new deaths, bringing the death toll to 25,100. Spain reported a total of 216,582 cases.
- Thailand reported six new cases, bringing the total number to 2,966. The death toll remains at 54 while 2,732 had recovered and 180 remain in hospital.
- Turkey reported a total of over 122,000 cases and 3,200 deaths.
- Ukraine reported 550 new cases and 7 new deaths, bringing the total numbers to 11,411 and 279 respectively; a total of 1,498 patients had recovered.
- The United Kingdom reported 621 deaths, bringing the total death toll to 28,131. England reported 370 deaths (25 of whom had no underlying health conditions) in hospitals, bringing the death toll to 20,853.
- The United States reported a total 65,645 deaths based on figures from Johns Hopkins University. The US also reported 34,000 cases, bringing the total number to more than 1.1 million. More than 164,000 people had recovered from the coronavirus and 6.5 million tests were conducted.
- Yemen reported three new cases, bringing the total to ten. Yemen reported a total of two deaths.
- There had been over 3.35 million cases, 239,000 deaths, and over 1.05 million recoveries globally.

=== 3 May ===
WHO Situation Report 104:

- Afghanistan reported a total of over 2,700 cases, 85 deaths, and conducted nearly 12,000 tests. Afghan health authorities also confirmed that 500 random tests in the capital Kabul identified 150 positive tests.
- Armenia reported a total of 2,386 cases and 35 deaths.
- Brazil reported 4,588 new cases, bringing the total to 101,147. Brazil reported 275 deaths, bringing the death toll to 7,025.
- Canada reported 160 new deaths, bringing the death toll to 3,606. Canada reported 1,576 new cases, bringing the total to 57,148.
- China reported two new cases and 12 new asymptomatic cases, bringing the total to 82,877. The death toll remains at 4,633.
- France reported 135 new deaths, bringing the death toll to 24,895. 25,815 remain in hospital and 3,819 in intensive care, down from 25,827 and 3,827 respectively.
- India reported 2,644 new cases, bringing the total to over 39,000. India reported 83 new deaths, bringing the death toll to 1,301.
- Indonesia reported 349 new cases, bringing the total to 11,912. Indonesia reported 18 deaths, bringing the death toll to 845.
- Iran reported 47 new deaths, bringing the death toll to 6,203. Iran reported a total of 97,424 cases.
- Israel reported a total of 16,194 cases and 230 deaths.
- Italy reported 174 deaths, bringing the death toll to 28,884. Italy reported 1,389 cases, bringing the total to 210,717.
- Malaysia reported 122 new cases, bringing the total number to 6,297. Malaysian health authorities also reported two new deaths, bringing the death toll to 105.
- The Netherlands reported 335 new cases, bringing the total to 40,471. The Dutch reported 69 new deaths, bringing the total to 5,056.
- New Zealand reported two new cases, bringing the total to 1,487 (1,136 confirmed and 351 probable). NZ health authorities also reported three new recoveries, bringing the total to 1,266.
- The Philippines reported a total of 9,223 cases and 607 deaths.
- Qatar reported 679 cases, bringing the total to 15,551. The country reported a total of 12 deaths.
- Russia reported 10,633 new cases.
- Singapore reported 657 new cases, bringing the total to 18,205. In addition, Singapore's Ministry of Health attributed the fluctuation of cases in recent days to a case backlog in a laboratory, with steps to fix that in progress. One death was later confirmed, bringing the total to 18.
- South Korea reported 13 new cases, 10 of which were imported.
- Thailand reported three new cases, bringing the total to 2,966. The country reported a total of 54 deaths.
- Turkey reported 61 deaths, bringing the death toll to 3,397. Turkey reported 1,670 new cases, bringing the total to 120,045. A total of 63,151 had recovered.
- Ukraine reported 502 new cases and 9 new deaths, bringing the total numbers to 11,913 and 288 respectively; a total of 1,547 patients had recovered.
- The United Kingdom reported 315 deaths, bringing the death toll to 28,446 including hospitals, care homes, and community figures.
- In the United States, Virginia reported its first death due to the virus, bringing the total deaths in the United States to 65,646.
- Vietnam reported its first new case in nine days, bringing the total to 271. More than 30,500 people had been quarantined and 261,000 had been tested.

=== 4 May ===
WHO Situation Report 105:

- Bangladesh reported 688 new cases, bringing the total to 10,143. The country reported a total of 182 deaths.
- Brazil reported 4,075 new cases, bring the total to 105,222. Brazil reported 263 deaths, bringing the death toll to 7,288.
- Chile reported 980 new cases, bringing the total to 20,643. The country also reported 10 new deaths, bringing the total to 270.
- China reported three new cases, bringing the total to 82,880. China also reported 13 new asymptomatic cases.
- Germany reported 679 new cases, bringing the total to 163,175. Germany reported 43 deaths, bringing the death toll to 6,692.
- Indonesia reported 395 new cases, bringing the total to 11,587. Indonesian health ministry official Achmad Yurianto also confirmed 19 new deaths, bringing the total to 864. A total of 1,954 had recovered.
- Iran reported 74 new deaths, bringing the death toll to 6,277. Iran reported a total of 98,647 cases.
- Israel reported 38 new cases, bringing the total number to 16,246. Three people died, bringing the death toll to 233. A total of 10,064 people had recovered and 6,436 people had been tested.
- Italy reported 195 new deaths, bringing the death toll to 29,079. Italy reported 1,221 new cases, bringing the total to 211,938. 99,980 remain infected with 1,479 in intensive care. 82,879 had recovered and 1.48 million had beeb tested for COVID-19.
- Malaysia reported 55 new cases, bringing the total to 6,353. 71 people had been discharged, bringing the number of recovered to 4,484. Malaysia reported no new deaths, with the death toll remaining at 105.
- The Netherlands reported 199 new cases, bringing the total to 40,770. Dutch authorities reported 26 new deaths, bringing the death toll to 5,082.
- New Zealand reported no new cases but one probable case was reclassified as confirmed, keeping the total at 1,487 (1,137 confirmed and 350 probable). In addition, NZ health authorities confirmed ten new recoveries, bringing the total to 1,276.
- The Philippines reported 16 new deaths, bringing the death toll to 623. The Philippines also reported 262 new cases, bringing the total to 9,485.
- Russia reported 10,581 new cases.
- Singapore reported 573 new cases, bringing the total to 18,778.
- South Korea reported eight new cases, bringing the total to 10,801.
- Turkey reported 65 deaths, bringing the death toll to 3,461. Turkish authorities reported 1,614 new cases, bringing the total to 127,659. A total of 68,166 people had recovered. Turkey conducted 35,771 new tests, bringing the total number of tests to 1.170 million.
- Ukraine reported 418 new cases and 15 new deaths, bringing the total numbers to 12,331 and 303 respectively; a total of 1,619 patients had recovered.
- The United Kingdom reported 288 deaths, bringing the death toll to 28,734.
- Yemen reported two new cases, bringing the total to 12. The country had had a total of two deaths.

=== 5 May ===
WHO Situation Report 106:

- Brazil reported 6,935 new cases, bringing the total to 114,715. Health authorities also reported 600 new deaths, bringing the total to 7,921.
- China reported one new case and 15 asymptomatic cases.
- France reported 330 deaths, bringing the death toll to 25,531. 25,755 people remain in hospital with 3,430 in intensive care, down from 25,548 and 3,696 respectively.
- Germany reported 685 new cases, bringing the total to 139,860. Germany also reported 139 deaths, bringing the total to 6,831.
- Indonesia reported 484 cases, bringing the total to 12,071.
- Iran reported 1,323 new cases, bringing the total to 99,970. Iranian health authorities also reported 63 deaths, bringing the death toll to 6,340.
- Italy reported 236 new deaths, bringing the death toll to 29,315. Italy reported 1,075 new cases, bringing the total to 213,013.
- Madagascar reported a total of 149 cases and no deaths.
- Malaysia reported 30 new cases, bringing the total to 6,883. 83 patients were discharged, bringing the total number of recoveries to 4,567. Malaysia reported one new death, bringing the death toll to 106.
- New Zealand reported no new cases and one previous probable case was rescinded, bringing the total down to 1,486 (1,137 confirmed and 349 probable). 26 new recoveries were reported, bringing the total to 1,302.
- Peru reported a total of 51,189 cases and 1,444 deaths.
- The Philippines reported 14 new deaths, bringing the death toll to 637. Health authorities also reported 199 new cases, bringing the total number to 9,684. 93 patients had recovered, bringing the total to 1,408.
- Russia reported 10,102 new cases, bringing the total to 155,370. Russia also reported 95 deaths, bringing the death toll to 1,451.
- Singapore reported 632 new cases, bringing the total to 19,410. In addition, a patient who had COVID-19 died from a heart attack.
- Spain reported 185 deaths, bringing the death toll to 25,428. The country reported a total of 219,329 cases.
- Sudan reported four new deaths, bringing the death toll to 45. Sudanese authorities reported 100 new cases, bringing the total to 778. 70 people had recovered from the coronavirus.
- Thailand reported one new case, bringing the total number to 2,988. Thailand reported no new deaths with the death toll remaining at 54. 2,747 had recovered while 84 are still being treated in hospitals.
- Turkey reported 59 deaths, bringing the death toll to 3,250. Turkey also reported 1,832 new cases, bringing the total to 129,491.
- Ukraine reported 366 new cases and 13 new deaths, bringing the total numbers to 12,697 and 316 respectively; a total of 1,875 patients had recovered.
- The United Kingdom reported over 30,000 deaths including 29,648 deaths in England and Wales.
- The United States reported a total of 70,115 deaths, 1,192,119 cases, and 187,000 recoveries. The hardest hit states are New York (27,073 deaths and over 321,000 cases) and New Jersey (8,244 deaths and over 130,600 cases).
- Yemen reported nine new cases, bringing the total to 21, and three deaths. The Houthi–controlled government in Sanaa reported its first case, a Somali man, and death.
- According to figures released by Johns Hopkins University, the number of global coronavirus cases exceeded 3.5 million, 251,718 had died, and 1.2 million had recovered.

=== 6 May ===
WHO Situation Report 107:

- Canada reported a total of 4,111 deaths and 62,458 cases.
- China reported two new cases and 20 new asymptomatic cases.
- In Ecuador, the Secoya tribe (also known as the Siekopai) reported 15 cases among their population of 744.
- France reported 4,183 new cases. French authorities also reported 278 new deaths (181 in hospitals and 97 in nursing homes), bringing the death toll to 16,237. 24,983 remain in hospital with 3,147 in intensive care.
- Germany reported 947 cases, bringing the total to 164,807. 165 died, bringing the death toll to 6,996.
- Iran reported 1,680 new cases, bringing the total number beyond the 100,000 mark.
- Italy reported 369 deaths, bringing the death toll to 29,684. Italy reported 1,444 cases, bringing the total to 214,457. 91,528 remained infected with 1,333 in intensive care. 1.550 million people had been tested.
- Malaysia reported 45 new cases, bringing the total to 6,248. Malaysia discharged 135 patients, bringing the number of recoveries to 4,702. Malaysia also reported one new death, bringing the death toll to 107.
- New Zealand reported two new cases (1 confirmed and 1 probable), bringing the total to 1,488 (1,138 confirmed and 350 probable). NZ health authorities reported 14 new recoveries, bringing the total to 1,316. New Zealand reported one new death, bringing the death toll to 21.
- The Philippines reported 320 new cases, bringing the total to 10,004. The Philippines reported 21 new deaths, bringing the death toll to 658.
- Qatar reported 830 cases, bringing the total to 15,890. The total number of recoveries reached 2,070.
- Russia reported 10,559 cases, bringing the total to 165,929. Russia reported 86 deaths, bringing the death toll to 1,537.
- Singapore reported 788 new cases, bringing the total to 20,198. Two deaths were confirmed, bringing the death toll to 20.
- Slovakia reported a total of 1,429 cases and 25 deaths, with recoveries being about half the total number of cases.
- South Ossetia reported its first three cases.
- Spain reported 244 deaths, bringing the death toll to 25,857. Spain reported 996 new cases, bringing the total to 220,325.
- Turkey reported 64 new deaths, bringing the death toll to 3,584. Turkey reported 2,253 new cases, bringing the total to 131,744. A total of 78,202 had recovered.
- Ukraine reported 487 new cases and 11 new deaths, bringing the total numbers to 13,184 and 327 respectively; a total of 2,097 patients had recovered.
- The International Council of Nurses reported that 90,000 nurses were affected, with 260 killed.
- Yemen reported three deaths and 25 cases.

=== 7 May ===
WHO Situation Report 108:

- Afghanistan reported a total of 3,563 cases and 106 deaths. Kabul reported 925 cases including 346 medical staff.
- The Africa CDC reported over 50,000 total cases in Africa with 8,000 in South Africa.
- Belarus reported a total of 19,225 cases and at least 112 deaths. The Belarusian government refused to impose any lockdown restrictions and quarantine measures.
- Brazil reported 10,503 new confirmed cases and 615 deaths.
- China reported two new cases, bringing the official tally to 82,885. The official death toll stands at 4,633.
- France reported 178 new cases, bringing the total to 25,987. 23,208 remain in hospital with 2,961 in intensive care.
- India reported 3,561 new cases, bringing the total to 52,952. Indian authorities reported 1,783 deaths.
- Indonesia reported 338 new cases, bringing the total to 12,776. 35 had died, bringing the death toll to 930. 96,717 people had been tested and 2,381 had recovered.
- Italy reported 274 deaths, bringing the death toll to 29,958. Italy reported 1,401 new cases, bringing the total to 215,858.
- Latvia reported a total of 909 cases and 18 deaths.
- Malaysia reported 39 new cases, bringing the total number to 6,467. 74 patients were discharged, bringing the total number of recovered to 4,776. 1,584 remain hospitalised, with 19 in intensive care and 18 on ventilator support. The death toll remains at 107.
- Mexico reported a total of 27,634 cases and 2,704 deaths.
- The Netherlands reported 455 cases, bringing the total to 41,774. Dutch health authorities reported 84 new deaths, bringing the death toll to 5,288.
- New Caledonia reported that all 18 COVID-19 patients had recovered, meaning there are no active cases.
- New Zealand reported one new case, bringing the total to 1,489 (1,139 confirmed and 350 probable). Health authorities also reported 16 new recoveries, bringing the total to 1,332. A record 7,323 tests were completed the day before.
- Qatar reported 918 new cases, bringing the total to 16,592. The death toll remains at 12.
- Russia reported 11,231 new cases (6,703 in Moscow), bringing the total to 177,160 (92,676 in Moscow). Russia also reported 88 new deaths, bringing the death toll to 1,625. Mayor of Moscow Sergei Sobyanin claimed that the number of cases in Moscow was much higher than the official figures.
- Singapore reported 741 new cases, bringing the total to 20,939.
- Spain reported 213 deaths, bringing the death toll to 26,070. Spain reported a total of 221,447 cases.
- Thailand reported three new cases, bringing the total to 2,992.
- Turkey reported 57 new deaths, bringing the death toll to 3,641. Turkey also reported 1,977 new cases, bringing the total to 133,721.
- Ukraine reported 507 new cases and 13 new deaths, bringing the total numbers to 13,691 and 340 respectively; a total of 2,396 patients had recovered.
- The United Kingdom reported 539 new deaths, bringing the death toll to 30,615.
- The United States reported its first death in immigration custody. Carlos Ernestor Escobar died from complications related to COVID-19 in a San Diego immigration detention facility.

=== 8 May ===
WHO Situation Report 109:

- Argentina reported a total of over 5,611 cases and 293 deaths.
- Australia reported a total of under 7,000 cases and nearly 100 deaths. 800 people remain in hospital.
- Brazil reported 10,222 new cases, bringing the total to 145,328. Brazil reported 751 deaths, bringing the death toll to 9,897.
- China reported one new case and 15 new asymptomatic cases. China officially recorded a total of 82,887 cases, 78,000 recoveries, and 4,633 deaths.
- France reported 243 deaths, raising the death toll to 26,230. 2,868 remain in intensive care.
- The six members of the Gulf Cooperation Council reported a total of almost 80,000 cases and 486 deaths.
- Honduras reported a total of 1,461 cases and 99 deaths.
- Italy reported 243 deaths, bringing the death toll to 30,201.
- Malaysia reported 68 new cases, bringing the total number to 6,535. 1,564 remain in hospital, with 17 in intensive care and seven on ventilator support. Malaysian authorities discharged 88 patients, bringing the number of recovered to 4,864. The death toll remains at 107.
- New Zealand reported one new confirmed case while a previous probable case was reclassified as confirmed, bringing the total to 1,490 (1,141 confirmed and 349 probable). 15 new recoveries were reported, bringing the total to 1,347, or 90% of all cases. A record 7,812 tests were completed the previous day.
- Qatar reported 1,311 new cases, bringing the total to over 20,000. Most of these cases had occurred among foreign migrant workers. The country reported 12 deaths.
- Russia reported 10,699 new cases, bringing the total to 187,859. Russia reported 98 deaths, bringing the death toll to 1,723.
- Singapore reported 768 new cases, bringing the total to 21,707.
- Spain reported 229 new deaths, bringing the death toll to 26,229. The country also reported a total of 222,857 cases.
- Thailand reported eight new cases, bringing the total to 3,000. The death toll remains at 55.
- Ukraine reported 504 new cases and 21 new deaths, bringing the total numbers to 14,195 and 361 respectively; a total of 2,706 patients had recovered.
- In the United States, New York reported that 73 children were infected with a new inflammatory syndrome believed to be linked to COVID-19. One five-year-old boy reportedly died.
- Yemen reported nine new cases, bringing the total to 34. Yemen reported two deaths, bringing the death toll to seven.

=== 9 May ===
WHO Situation Report 110:

- Australia reported a total of 6,927 cases and 97 deaths.
- Belarus recorded a total of 21,101 cases and 26 deaths.
- Canada reported 157 new deaths, bringing the death toll to 4,628. Canada reported 1,381 cases, bringing the total to 66,780.
- France reported 80 deaths, bringing the death toll to 26,310. 22,614 remain in hospital with 2,812 in intensive care.
- Germany reported 1,251 cases, bringing the total to 168,551. Germany reported 147 deaths, bringing the death toll to 7,369.
- Indonesia reported 533 new cases, bringing the total to 13,645. Indonesia reported 16 deaths, bringing the total to 959.
- Iran reported 1,529 new cases, bringing the total to 106,220. Iran reported 48 deaths, bringing the death toll to 6,589. While most provinces had seen a drop in cases, cases had continued to rise in Khuzestan.
- Italy reported 194 deaths, bringing the death toll to 30,395. Italy reported 1,083 new cases, bringing the total to 218,268. 1,034 remain in intensive care.
- Malaysia reported 54 new cases, bringing the total to 6,589. Malaysia reported one death, bringing the total to 108.
- New Zealand reported two new cases (one confirmed and the other probable), bringing the total to 1,492 (1,142 confirmed and 350 probable). 21 new recoveries were reported, bringing the total to 1,368.
- The Philippines reported 147 cases, bringing the total to 10,610. The Philippines reported 8 deaths, bringing the total to 704.
- Qatar reported 1,130 cases, bringing the total to 21,331. Qatar reported one death, bringing the death toll to 13.
- Russia reported 10,817 cases, bringing the total to 198,676. Russia reported 104 deaths, bringing the death toll to 1,827.
- Singapore reported 753 new cases, bringing the total to 22,460.
- South Korea reported 18 new cases, bringing the total to 10,840. The country reported 256 deaths.
- Spain reported 721 new cases, bringing the total to 223,578. Spain also reported 179 deaths, bringing the total to 26,478.
- Thailand reported four new cases, bringing the total to 3,004. Thailand also reported one death, bringing the death toll to 56.
- Ukraine reported 515 new cases and 15 new deaths, bringing the total numbers to 14,710 and 376 respectively; a total of 2,909 patients had recovered.
- The United Kingdom reported 346 deaths, bringing the death toll to 31,587.
- The United States reported a total of 1,342,329 cases, 79,906 deaths, and 232,821 recoveries. In New York, Governor Andrew Cuomo announced that three more children had died of an infectious disease linked to COVID-19.

=== 10 May ===
WHO Situation Report 111:

- Brazil reported a total of 10,627 deaths and 155,939 cases. However, scientists believe that the real figures are higher due to a lack of widespread testing.
- Canada reported 100 new deaths, bringing the death toll to 4,728. Canada reported 1,216 new cases, bringing the total to 66,796.
- China reported 14 new cases (12 community transmissions and 2 imported); 11 of these cases occurred in Jilin province and one in Hubei.
- France reported 70 new deaths, bringing the death toll to 26,380. 36 people were discharged from intensive care, bringing the total number in intensive care down to 2,776.
- Germany reported 667 new cases, bringing the total to 169,218. Germany also reported 26 deaths, bringing the death toll to 7,395.
- Iran reported 51 new deaths.
- Lebanon reported 36 new cases, bringing the total to 845. Lebanon's death toll remains at 26.
- Malaysia reported 67 new cases (49 of them foreigners), bringing the total to 6,656. 1,525 remain in hospital; 18 in intensive care and 6 on ventilators. 96 were discharged, bringing the total number of recoveries to 5,025. The death toll remains at 108.
- New Zealand reported two new cases (both confirmed), bringing the total to 1,494 (1,144 confirmed and 350 probable). Two people remain in hospital. Three people had recovered, bringing the total to 1,371.
- The Philippines reported 184 new cases, bringing the total to 10,794. 15 deaths had been recorded, bringing the death toll to 719. 82 had recovered, bringing the total number of recovered to 1,924.
- Russia reported 11,012 new cases, bringing the total to 209,668. Russia reported 88 deaths, bringing the death toll to 1,195.
- Singapore reported 876 new cases, bringing the total to 23,336. In addition, 33 false positive tests were recorded due to calibration issues in one of the test kits.
- South Korea reported 34 new cases (26 community transmissions and eight imported). Most of these cases were linked to night clubs in Seoul's Itaewon district.
- Spain reported 143 deaths, bringing the death toll to 26,621. Spain reported 224,390 casualties.
- Thailand reported five new cases, bringing the total to 3,009. The death toll remains at 59.
- Turkey reported a total of 137,115 cases and 3,739 deaths.
- Ukraine reported 522 new cases and 15 new deaths, bringing the total numbers to 15,232 and 391 respectively; a total of 2,909 patients had recovered.
- The United Kingdom reported 269 deaths, bringing the national death toll to 31,855.
- In the United States, at least 25,600 residents and workers had died at nursing homes and other long-term care facilities for the elderly. The coronavirus affected 143,000 people at about 7,500 facilities.
- A total of about 4 million cases, almost 1.4 million recoveries, and over 279,000 deaths were reported globally.

=== 11 May ===
WHO Situation Report 112:

- Malaysia reported 70 new cases, bringing the total to 6,726. There are 1,504 active cases, with 20 cases in intensive care. 88 were discharged, bringing the total number of recovered to 5,113. Malaysia reported one new death, bringing the death toll to 109.
- New Zealand reported three new cases (all confirmed), bringing the total to 1,497 (1,147 confirmed and 350 probable). 15 new recoveries were reported, bringing the total to 1,386. The number of active cases dropped below 90.
- Singapore reported 486 new cases, bringing the total to 23,822. Subsequently, 35 false positive results were subtracted from the tally, bringing the total to 23,787. Another death was later confirmed, bringing the death toll to 21, with another who died from a heart attack and subsequently tested positive.
- Ukraine reported 416 new cases and 17 new deaths, bringing the total numbers to 15,648 and 408 respectively; a total of 3,288 patients had recovered.

=== 12 May ===
WHO Situation Report 113:

- India reported 87 deaths and 3,604 new cases, bringing the total number of cases to 70,756.
- Malaysia reported 16 more cases, bringing the total number to 6,742. 110 patients had recovered, bringing the total number to 5,223. The death toll remains at 109.
- New Zealand reported no new cases, with the total remaining at 1,497 (1,147 confirmed and 350 probable). 12 new recoveries were reported, bringing the total number of recoveries to 1,398.
- Singapore reported 884 new cases, bringing the total to 24,671. Two more deaths from other causes were recorded, subsequently tested positive.
- Ukraine reported 375 new cases and 17 new deaths, bringing the total numbers to 16,023 and 425 respectively; a total of 3,373 patients had recovered.

=== 13 May ===
WHO Situation Report 114:

- Indonesia reported 689 new cases, bringing the cases to 15,438. 21 died, bringing the death toll to 1,028. 3,287 had recovered.
- Lesotho reported its first case.
- Malaysia reported 37 new cases (four imported and 33 local transmissions), bringing the total to 6,779. 58 had recovered, bringing the total number of recoveries to 5,281. Malaysia reported two deaths, bringing the death toll to 111.
- New Zealand reported no new cases, with the total number of cases remaining at 1,497. NZ authorities also reported four recoveries, bringing the total to 1,402.
- Singapore reported 675 new cases, bringing the total to 25,346.
- Ukraine reported 402 new cases and 14 new deaths, bringing the total numbers to 16,425 and 439 respectively; a total of 3,716 patients had recovered.

=== 14 May ===
WHO Situation Report 115:

- The Canadian province of Ontario reported 345 new cases.
- Malaysia reported 40 new cases bringing the total to 6,819. 70 patients were harged, bringing the total number of recoveries to 5,351. Malaysia also reported one new death, bringing the death toll to 112.
- New Zealand reported no new cases, with the total remaining at 1,497. Nine people had recovered, bringing the total number of recovered to 1,411.
- Singapore reported 752 new cases, bringing the total to 26,098.
- Ukraine reported 422 new cases and 17 new deaths, bringing the total numbers to 16,847 and 456 respectively; a total of 4,143 patients had recovered.

=== 15 May ===
WHO Situation Report 116:

- Fiji confirmed one recovery.
- Malaysia reported 36 new cases, bringing the total number of cases to 6,855. There are 1,304 active cases. 88 people had recovered, bringing the total number of recovered to 5,439.
- New Zealand reported one new case, bringing the total to 1,498 cases (1,148 confirmed and 350 probable). 10 more people had recovered, bringing the total number to 1,421. The new case was linked to the Marist College cluster.
- Singapore reported 793 new cases, bringing the total to 26,891.
- Ukraine reported 483 new cases and 20 new deaths, bringing the total numbers to 17,330 and 476 respectively; a total of 4,473 patients had recovered.

=== 16 May ===
WHO Situation Report 117:

- Malaysia reported 17 new cases, bringing the total number of cases to 6,782. 73 patients had recovered, bringing the total number to 5,512. Malaysian authorities also reported one new death, bringing the death toll to 113.
- New Zealand reported no new cases, with the total number remaining at 1,498. Seven people had recovered, bringing the total number of recoveries to 1,428.
- Singapore reported 465 new cases, bringing the total to 27,356. Another death was later confirmed, bringing the total to 22.
- Ukraine reported 528 new cases and 21 new deaths, bringing the total numbers to 17,858 and 497 respectively; a total of 4,473 patients had recovered.

=== 17 May ===
WHO Situation Report 118:

- Malaysia reported 22 new cases, bringing the total number to 6,894. There are 1,210 active cases while 59 had recovered, bringing the total number of recoveries to 5,571.
- New Zealand reported one new case, bringing the total number of confirmed and probable to cases to 1,499. There remain 45 active cases. Five more people had recovered, bringing the total number of recoveries to 1,433. The latest confirmed case was a Canterbury toddler linked to the Rosewood cluster in Christchurch.
- Singapore reported 682 new cases, bringing the total to 28,038.
- Ukraine reported 433 new cases and 17 new deaths, bringing the total numbers to 18,291 and 514 respectively; a total of 5,116 patients had recovered.

=== 18 May ===
WHO Situation Report 119:

- Malaysia reported 47 new cases, bringing the total number of cases to 6,941. 44 were discharged from hospital, bringing the total number of recoveries to 5,615. There are 1,213 active cases, with 13 in intensive care and six on ventilator support.
- New Zealand reported no new cases, recoveries or deaths; with the total number of probable and confirmed cases remaining 1,499, recovered cases 1,433, and deaths 21. There remain 45 active cases with two remaining in hospitals.
- Singapore reported 305 new cases, bringing the total to 28,343.
- Ukraine reported 325 new cases and 21 new deaths, bringing the total numbers to 18,616 and 535 respectively; a total of 5,276 patients had recovered.

=== 19 May ===
WHO Situation Report 120:

- China reported 6 new cases including one in Wuhan.
- Malaysia reported 37 new cases, bringing the total number to 6,978. One more death been reported, bringing the death toll to 114. 31 had recovered, bringing the total number of recovered to 5,646. There are 1,213 active cases, with 11 in intensive care and six on ventilator support.
- New Zealand reported four new cases, bringing the total number of confirmed and probable cases to 1,503 (1,153 confirmed and 350 probable cases). Nine people had recovered, bringing the total number to 1,442. There are 40 active cases, down from five the day before.
- Singapore reported 451 new cases, bringing the total to 28,794.
- Ukraine reported 260 new cases and 13 new deaths, bringing the total numbers to 18,876 and 548 respectively; a total of 5,632 patients had recovered.

=== 20 May ===
WHO Situation Report 121:

- Malaysia reported 31 new cases, bringing the total to 7,009. 60 patients were discharged, bringing the total number of recoveries to 5,706. There are 1,189 active cases in hospitals, with 11 in intensive care and seven on ventilator support.
- New Zealand reported five new recoveries, bringing the total number of recoveries to 1,447. There are 35 active cases with one case remaining in hospital. The total number of probable and confirmed cases stands at 1,503 while the death toll remains at 21.
- Singapore reported 570 new cases, bringing the total to 29,364.
- Ukraine reported 354 new cases and 16 new deaths, bringing the total numbers to 19,230 and 564 respectively; a total of 5,955 patients had recovered.

=== 21 May ===
WHO Situation Report 122:

- Malaysia reported 50 new cases, bringing the total to 7,050. There are 1,149 active cases, ten in intensive care and seven on respirator support. 90 people were discharged, bringing the total number of recoveries to 5,796.
- New Zealand reported five new recoveries, bringing the total number to 1,452. There are 30 active cases with one remaining in hospital. The total number of probable and confirmed cases stands at 1,502 while the death toll remains at 21.
- Singapore reported 448 new cases, bringing the total to 29,812. Another death was later confirmed, bringing the total to 23.
- Ukraine reported 476 new cases and 15 new deaths, bringing the total numbers to 19,706 and 579 respectively; a total of 6,227 patients had recovered.

=== 22 May ===
WHO Situation Report 123:

- Malaysia reported 78 new cases, bringing the total number to 7,137. There are 1,163 active cases, with nine in intensive care and five on ventilator support. 63 had recovered, bringing the total number of recoveries to 5,859. Malaysia also reported one new death, bringing the death toll to 115.
- New Zealand reported one new case, bringing the total number of probable and confirmed cases to 1,504. Three people had recovered, bringing the total number of recoveries to 1,455. There are 28 active cases with one in hospital.
- Singapore reported 614 new cases, bringing the total to 30,426.
- Ukraine reported 442 new cases and 9 new deaths, bringing the total numbers to 20,148 and 588 respectively; a total of 6,585 patients had recovered.

=== 23 May ===
WHO Situation Report 124:

- Malaysia reported 48 new cases, bringing the total to 7,185. There had been 1,158 active cases, with nine in intensive care and five on ventilator support. 53 had been discharged, bringing the total number of recoveries to 5,912. The death toll stands at 115.
- New Zealand reported no new cases, deaths, and recoveries. The total number of confirmed and probable cases stands at 1,504; the death toll at 21; and the number of recoveries at 1,455.
- Singapore reported 642 new cases, bringing the total to 31,068.
- Ukraine reported 432 new cases and 17 new deaths, bringing the total numbers to 20,580 and 605 respectively; a total of 6,929 patients had recovered.

=== 24 May ===
WHO Situation Report 125:

- Brazil reported a total of over 363,000 cases and nearly 23,000 deaths.
- Malaysia reported 60 new cases, bringing the total to 7,245. There are 1,185 active cases, with nine in intensive care and four on ventilator support. 33 were discharged, bringing the total number of recoveries to 5,945. The death toll remains at 115.
- New Zealand reported one new recovery, bringing the total number of recoveries to 1,456 and leaving 27 active cases. The total number of confirmed and probably cases remains at 1,154, and the death toll at 21.
- Singapore reported 548 new cases, bringing the total to 31,616.
- Ukraine reported 406 new cases and 12 new deaths, bringing the total numbers to 20,986 and 617 respectively; a total of 7,108 patients had recovered.

=== 25 May ===
WHO Situation Report 126:

- Malaysia reported 172 new cases, bringing the total number of cases to 7,417. There are 1,410 active cases. 34 were discharged, bringing the total number of recoveries to 5,979. The death toll remains at 115.
- New Zealand reported no new cases, recoveries, and deaths, which remain at 1,504 (1,154 confirmed and 350 probable), 1,456, and 21 respectively. There are 27 active cases.
- The Philippines reported 284 new cases, bringing the total to 14,319. The Philippines also reported that 74 had recovered, bringing the total to 3,323. There were five new deaths, bringing the death toll to 873.
- Singapore reported 344 new cases, bringing the total to 31,960.
- Ukraine reported 259 new cases and 6 new deaths, bringing the total numbers to 21,245 and 623 respectively; a total of 7,108 patients had recovered.

=== 26 May ===
WHO Situation Report 127:

- Malaysia reported 187 new cases (10 imported and 177 local transmissions), bringing the total number to 7,604. Of the 177 local transmissions, 173 involved foreigners detained at immigration detention centres. 62 were discharged, bringing the total number of recoveries to 6,041. There are 1,448 active cases in Malaysia; with eight in intensive care and five on ventilator support.
- New Zealand reported five new recoveries, bringing the total number of recovered to 1,461. There are 22 active cases, with the total number confirmed and probable cases remaining 1,504. The death toll remained at 21.
- Singapore reported 383 new cases, bringing the total to 32,343.
- Ukraine reported 339 new cases and 21 new deaths, bringing the total numbers to 21,584 and 644 respectively; a total of 7,575 patients had recovered.
- The George Floyd protests begin in Minneapolis. Largely via social media, they later spread throughout the country and around the world. Health experts and public officials expressed concerns that these mass gatherings may cause an exacerbated spread of the virus from 31 May or earlier.

=== 27 May ===
WHO Situation Report 128:

- Malaysia reported 15 new cases (the lowest figure since the movement control order began on 18 March), bringing the total to 7,619. 42 were discharged, bringing the total number of recoveries to 6,083. There are 1,421 active cases; with six in intensive care and four on ventilator support. The death toll remains at 115.
- New Zealand reported one new recovery, bringing the total number of recovered to 1,462. There are 21 active cases, with the total number of confirmed and probably cases remaining 1,504. The death toll still stands at 21.
- Singapore reported 533 new cases, bringing the total to 32,876.
- Ukraine reported 321 new cases and 14 new deaths, bringing the total numbers to 21,905 and 658 respectively; a total of 7,995 patients had recovered.
- The United States reported 100,000 deaths as a result of the COVID-19 pandemic with 29,000 recorded in New York state.

=== 28 May ===
WHO Situation Report 129:

- Malaysia reported ten new cases, bringing the total number to 7,629. 86 patients were discharged, bringing the total number of recoveries to 6,169. There are 1,345 active cases, with eight in intensive care and four on ventilator support. The death toll remains at 115.
- New Zealand reported 12 new recoveries, bringing the total number of recovered to 1,474. There remain eight active cases after a death was reported to be linked to the St Margaret's rest home cluster in Auckland; bringing the death toll to 22. The total number of cases remains at 1,504 (1,154 confirmed and 350 probables).
- Russia reported 174 deaths, bringing the death toll to 4,142. Russia also reported 8,371 new cases, bringing the total to 379,051.
- Singapore reported 373 new cases, bringing the total to 33,249.
- Ukraine reported 477 new cases and 11 new deaths, bringing the total numbers to 22,382 and 669 respectively; a total of 8,439 patients had recovered.

=== 29 May ===
WHO Situation Report 130:

- Malaysia reported 103 new cases, bringing the total to 7,732. 66 patients were discharged, bringing the total number of recoveries to 6,235. There are 1,382 active cases, with eight in intensive care and two on ventilator support.
- New Zealand reported seven new recoveries, bringing the total number of recoveries to 1,481. There was one active case, with the total number of cases being 1,504 (1,154 confirmed and 350 probable). The death toll remained at 22.
- Singapore reported 611 new cases, bringing the total to 33,860.
- Ukraine reported 429 new cases and 10 new deaths, bringing the total numbers to 22,811 and 679 respectively; a total of 8,934 patients had recovered.

=== 30 May ===
WHO Situation Report 131:

- Malaysia reported 30 new cases, bringing the total number to 7,762. 95 patients were discharged, bringing the total number of recovered to 6,330. There are 1,137 active cases, with nine patients in intensive care and two on ventilator support. The death toll remains at 115.
- New Zealand reported no new cases, recoveries or deaths, with the total number remaining 1,504, 1,481, and 22 respectively. There remains only one active case.
- Singapore reported 506 new cases, bringing the total to 34,366.
- Ukraine reported 393 new cases and 17 new deaths, bringing the total numbers to 23,204 and 696 respectively; a total of 9,311 patients had recovered.

=== 31 May ===
WHO Situation Report 132:

- Malaysia reported 57 new cases (10 imported and 47 local transmissions), bringing the total to 7,819 cases. 23 were discharged, bringing the total number of recovered to 6,353. There are 1,351 active cases with nine in intensive care and two on ventilator support.
- New Zealand reported no new cases, recoveries, or deaths, with the total number remaining 1,504, 1,481 and 22 respectively. There remains only one active case.
- Singapore reported 518 new cases, bringing the total to 34,884. Tests on all nursing homes found almost all residents and staff healthy except for five cases detected earlier.
- Ukraine reported 468 new cases and 12 new deaths, bringing the total numbers to 23,672 and 708 respectively; a total of 9,538 patients had recovered.

== Summary ==
=== Timeline ===
Countries and territories that confirmed their first cases during May 2020:

Date	Country or territory
6 May	South Ossetia
13 May	Lesotho

By the end of May, only the following countries and territories had not reported any cases of SARS-CoV-2 infections:

Africa

- Sahrawi Arab Democratic Republic
- Saint Helena, Ascension and Tristan da Cunha

Asia

- Christmas Island
- Cocos (Keeling) Islands
- North Korea
- Turkmenistan

Europe

- Svalbard

Oceania

- American Samoa
- Cook Islands
- Kiribati
- Marshall Islands
- Federated States of Micronesia
- Nauru
- Niue
- Norfolk Island
- Palau
- Pitcairn Islands
- Samoa
- Solomon Islands
- Tokelau
- Tonga
- Tuvalu
- Vanuatu
- Wallis and Futuna

== See also ==
- Timeline of the COVID-19 pandemic
