= COVID-19 Response Acceleration Task Force =

Task force to handle the COVID-19 pandemic in Indonesia

- Gugus Tugas Percepatan Penanganan COVID-19
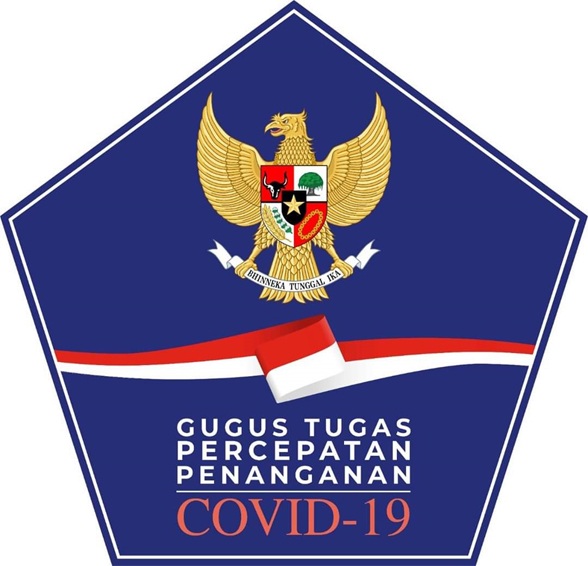

Agency overview
- Formed: 13 March 2020 (5 years ago)
- Dissolved: 20 July 2020 (5 years ago)
- Superseding agency: COVID-19 Handling and National Economic Recovery Committee (Indonesian: Komite Penanganan COVID-19 dan Pemulihan Ekonomi Nasional)
- Jurisdiction: Indonesia
- Headquarters: Indonesian National Board for Disaster Management headquarters, Jakarta, Indonesia; 6.1928°S 106.8686°E
- Agency executive: Doni Monardo, Chief
- Website: covid19.go.id

COVID-19 Response Acceleration Task Force (Indonesian: Gugus Tugas Percepatan Penanganan COVID-19) was a task force that coordinated and oversaw the Indonesian government's efforts to accelerate the mitigation of the COVID-19 pandemic. It was established on 13 March 2020, coordinated by the Indonesian National Board for Disaster Management and involving the Ministry of Health, Indonesian National Police, and Indonesian Armed Forces. The task force executive board was led by Indonesian National Board for Disaster Management head Doni Monardo, with Coordinating Minister for Human Development and Cultural Affairs Muhadjir Effendy as the head of the advisory board.

The task force was dissolved on 20 July 2020 according to Perpres Nomor 82 Tahun 2020 (Presidential Regulation No. 82 of 2020). Its duties were moved to the COVID-19 handling task unit in the National COVID-19 Handling and Economic Recovery Committee.

== Background ==
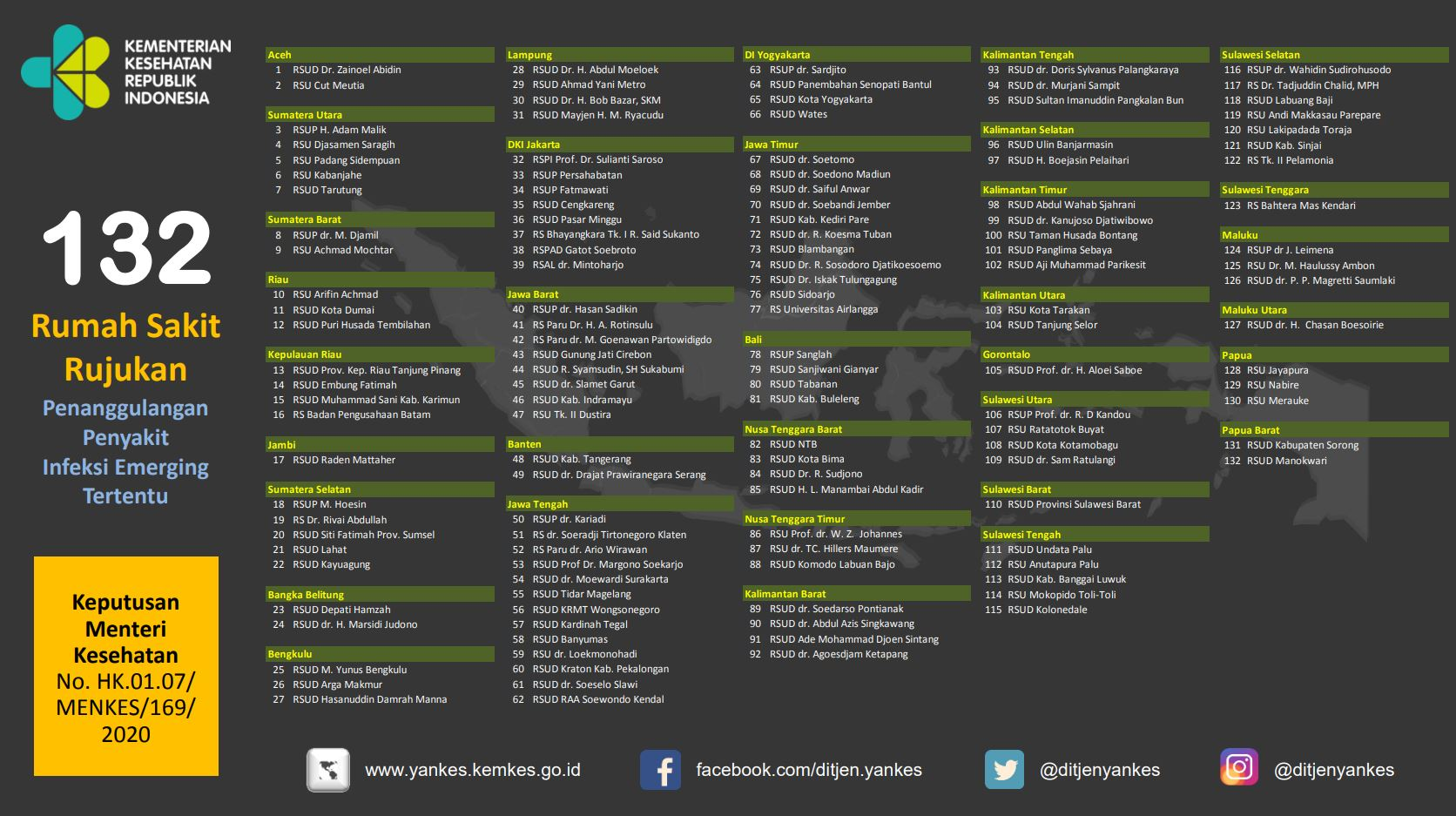
Treatment Facilities List

A man from the Netherlands may have been the first confirmed coronavirus patient in Indonesia when he fell ill there in January. He was treated in three hospitals while he was ill in East Java in January 2020. Indonesia banned all flights from and to mainland China starting on 5 February. The government also stopped giving free visas and visas on arrival for Chinese nationals. Those who lived or had stayed in mainland China in the previous 14 days were barred from entering or transiting through Indonesia. Indonesians were discouraged from travelling to China.

The Ministry of Health ordered the installation of thermal scanners for at least 135 airport gates and port docks, and announced that provisioning over 100 hospitals with isolation rooms (to WHO-recommended standards) would begin. On 2 March 2020, President Joko Widodo confirmed the first two cases of COVID-19 in the country in a televised statement. According to the Minister of Health Terawan Agus Putranto, the patients contracted the virus from an infected Japanese person in Depok who later tested positive in Malaysia. Both Indonesian patients were subsequently hospitalized at Sulianti Saroso Infection Center Hospital, North Jakarta. Starting on 4 March, Jakarta MRT also began scanning the temperature of passengers entering the stations and denying access to those with symptoms of high fever.

Starting on 8 March, travel restrictions expanded to include Daejeon and Gyeongsangbuk-do in South Korea, Lombardy, Veneto and Emilia-Romagna regions of Italy, and Tehran and Qom in Iran. Visitors with travel history within those countries but outside of the aforementioned regions had to provide a valid health certificate during check-in for all transportation into Indonesia. Despite the restriction on travellers from South Korea, Indonesia still allowed flights from South Korea.

The first confirmed death from coronavirus in the country occurred on 11 March 2020. However, a Telkom employee who had died on 3 March tested positive for COVID-19 on 14 March; he had infected his wife and child.

On 13 March, the government designated 132 treatment facilities across Indonesia.

== Members ==
=== Executive board ===
Task Force Member		Role	Notes
Portrait of Doni Monardo	Doni Monardo	Indonesian National Board for Disaster Management Head Chair of Task Force	Appointed 13 March 2020
	Oscar Primadi	Ministry of Health Secretary General Deputy Chair of Task Force	Added 20 March 2020
	Susyanto	Ministry of State Owned Enterprises Secretary General Deputy Chair of Task Force	Added 20 March 2020
	Achmad Djamaludin	National Resilience Council Secretary General Deputy Chair of Task Force	Added 20 March 2020
	Arios Tiopan Aritonang	Indonesian Armed Forces Operational Assistant Chief Deputy Chair of Task Force	Appointed 13 March 2020
	Herry Rudolf Nahak	Indonesian National Police Operational Assistant Chief Deputy Chair of Task Force	Appointed 13 March 2020

=== Advisory board ===
Task Force Member		Role	Notes
Portrait of Muhadjir Effendy	Muhadjir Effendy	Coordinating Minister for Human Development and Cultural Affairs Head of Task Force Advisory Board	Appointed 13 March 2020
	Mahfud MD	Coordinating Minister for Political, Legal, and Security Affairs Deputy Head of Task Force Advisory Board	Appointed 13 March 2020
Portrait of Terawan Putranto	Terawan Putranto	Minister of Health Deputy Head of Task Force Advisory Board	Appointed 13 March 2020
Portrait of Sri Mulyani	Sri Mulyani	Minister of Finance Secretary of Task Force Advisory Board	Appointed 13 March 2020
