= Doni Monardo =

Indonesian Army lieutenant general (1963–2023)

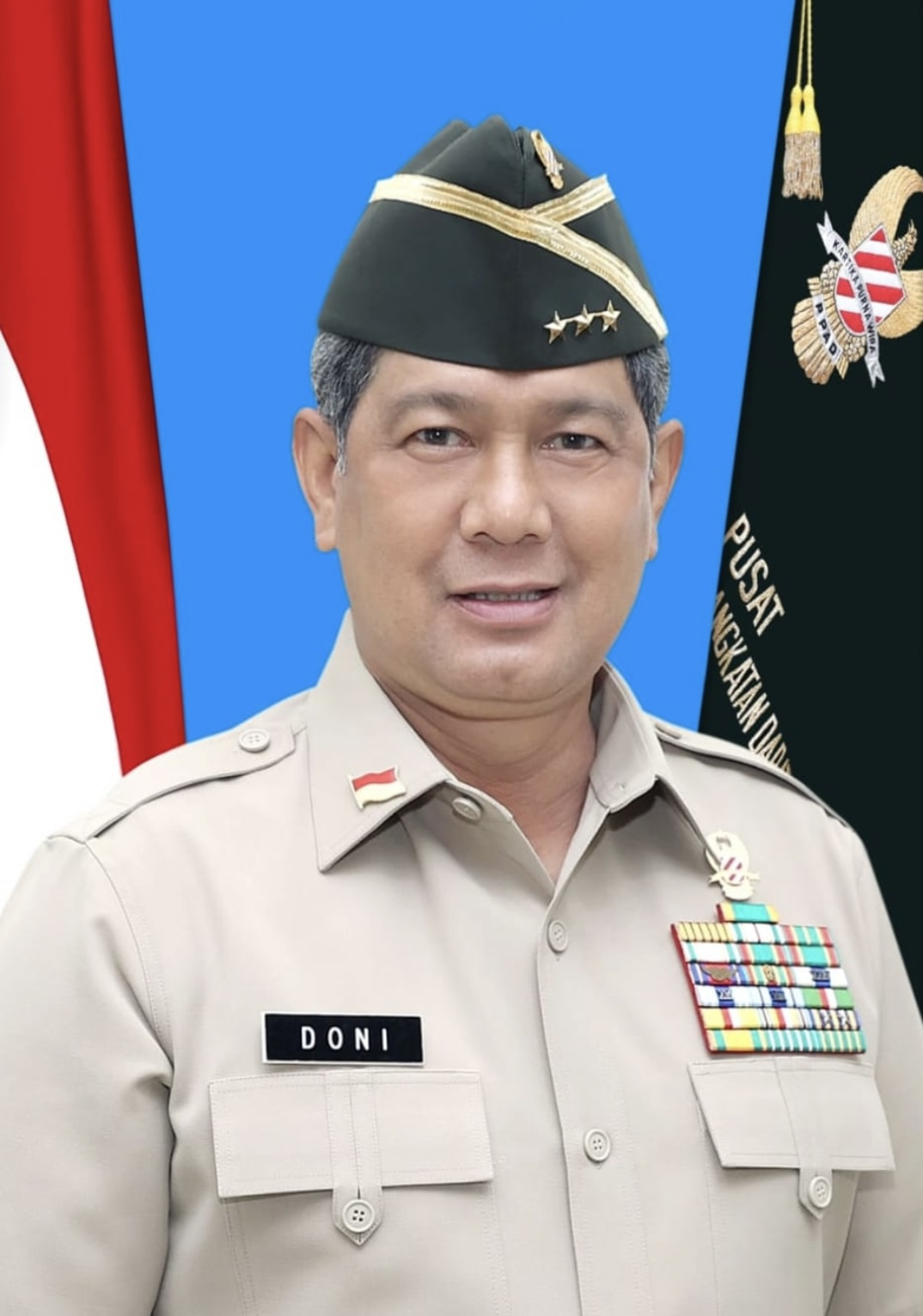

3rd Head of Indonesian National Board for Disaster Management
- In office 9 January 2019 – 25 May 2021
- Preceded by: Willem Rampangilei
- Succeeded by: Ganip Warsito

Chairperson of COVID-19 Handling Task Force
- In office 13 March 2020 – 25 May 2021
- Preceded by: position established as Head of Coronavirus Disease Response Acceleration Task Force (March–July 2020)
- Succeeded by: Ganip Warsito

14th Secretary General of National Resilience Council
- In office 14 March 2018 – 27 May 2019
- Preceded by: Nugroho Widyotomo
- Succeeded by: Achmad Djamaludin

41st Commander of Kodam III/Siliwangi
- In office 27 October 2017 – 19 March 2018
- Preceded by: Muhammad Herindra
- Succeeded by: Besar Harto Karyawan

25th Commander of Kodam XVI/Pattimura
- In office 25 July 2015 – 27 October 2017
- Preceded by: Wiyarto
- Succeeded by: Suko Pranoto

27th Commandant General of Kopassus
- In office 5 September 2014 – 25 July 2015
- Preceded by: Agus Sutomo
- Succeeded by: Muhammad Herindra

20th Commander of Presidential Security Force of Indonesia
- In office 15 June 2012 – 5 September 2014
- Preceded by: Agus Sutomo
- Succeeded by: Andika Perkasa

Personal details
- Born: 10 May 1963 Cimahi, West Java, Indonesia
- Died: 3 December 2023 (aged 60) Jakarta, Indonesia
- Resting place: Kalibata Heroes' Cemetery
- Spouse: Santi Ariviani
- Relations: Mochammad Arief Wibisono (son-in-law)
- Children: Azzianti Riani Monardo (1993); Reizalka Dwika Monardo (1997); Adelwin Azel Monardo (2003)
- Parents: Nasrul Saad (father); Roeslina (mother)
- Education: Indonesian Military Academy (1985)

Military service
- Allegiance: Indonesia
- Branch/service: Indonesian Army
- Years of service: 1985–2021
- Rank: Lieutenant General
- Unit: Infantry (Kopassus)

Doni Monardo (10 May 1963 – 3 December 2023) was an Indonesian Army lieutenant general who had previously served as the Head of Indonesian National Board for Disaster Management (BNPB). He also served as Chief of the Coronavirus Disease Response Acceleration Task Force during the COVID-19 pandemic in Indonesia. Monardo supported the government's decision to refrain from a country-wide lockdown, arguing doing so would overwhelm the government.

== Early life ==
Monardo was born in Cimahi, though both his parents were from the Minangkabau ethnic group. His father, Nasrul Saad, was a lieutenant colonel for Indonesia’s Army Military Police Corps. His mother, Roeslina, was a housewife. Monardo spent the majority of his childhood in Meulaboh and later on Lhokseumawe where his father was assigned. Nevertheless, he returned to Padang in 1975 to attend a public high school. After graduation, he continued his father’s footsteps by enrolling at Indonesian Military Academy and received his diploma in 1985. He continued his studies at Indonesian Army Command and General Staff College, which he graduated from in 1999. He went on to pursue further education in the Indonesian National Resilience Institute that he completed in 2012.

== Career ==
In 1985, Monardo started his career as a member of Kopassus immediately after graduating from the military academy. He spent 12 years as part of the special forces group and was involved in the Aceh and East Timor conflicts. In 1999, he was assigned as a Raider Battalion, serving in Bali.

By 2001, he was already part of the Presidential Security Force of Indonesia, leading a command serving Susilo Bambang Yudhoyono. From 2004 to 2008, he served in the Army Strategic Command and was posted in South Sulawesi for his last two years in the formation. He continued his posting as part of the Presidential Security Force of Indonesia until 2010, and at that same year was promoted to brigadier general and became the vice-commander general of Kopassus. He continued serving Susilo Bambang Yudhoyono’s administration until 2014 and was promoted as the commander of the Presidential Security Force of Indonesia during his service.

In 2015, during Joko Widodo’s administration, Monardo was named as the commandant-general of Kopassus. He continued serving in military units until 2018. By later that year, he was named the secretary-general of the National Defense Council. In 2019, he was chosen to lead the Indonesian National Board for Disaster Management.

== Personal life and death ==
Monardo married Santi Ariviani in 1992. Ariviani was the daughter of Taufik Marta, an Army colonel who became the regent of Pasaman Regency, West Sumatra for two consecutive years. The couple had three children: Azzianti Riani Monardo, Reizalka Dwika Monardo, and Adelwin Azel Monardo.

Monardo died on 3 December 2023 at Siloam Hospital in Semanggi, Jakarta, at the age of 60.

== Education ==
- SMA Negeri 1 Padang (1981)
- Indonesian Military Academy (1985)
- Indonesian Army Command and General Staff College (1999)
- National Resilience Institute (Lemhanas) (2012)

== Awards ==
- Bintang Jasa Utama
- Bintang Dharma (2019)
- Bintang Yudha Dharma Pratama
- Bintang Kartika Eka Paksi Pratama
- Bintang Yudha Dharma Nararya
- Bintang Kartika Eka Paksi Nararya
- Bintang Kartika Eka Paksi Nararya (Ul. I)
- The Royal Order of Sahametrei Grand Cross (Cambodia)
- SL. Dharma Bantala
- SL. Kesetiaan XXIV
- SL. Kesetiaan XVI
- SL. Kesetiaan VIII
- SL. Dharma Nusa
- SL. Wira Siaga
- SL. Ksatria Yudha
- SL. Seroja
- SL. Dwidja Sistha
- SL. Wira Karya
- SL. Kebaktian Sosial
