= Deaths in January 2003 =

The following is a list of notable deaths in January 2003.

Entries for each day are listed alphabetically by surname. A typical entry lists information in the following sequence:

- Name, age, country of citizenship at birth, subsequent country of citizenship (if applicable), reason for notability, cause of death (if known), and reference.

== January 2003 ==
=== 1 ===
- Royce D. Applegate, 63, American actor (seaQuest DSV, Diff'rent Strokes, Dallas, Home Improvement).
- Joe Foss, 87, American politician, fighter pilot, recipient of the Medal of Honor.
- Giorgio Gaber, 63, Italian singer-songwriter and playwright, lung cancer.
- Ben Hightower, 84, American football player (Cleveland Rams, Detroit Lions).
- Milan Janić, 45, Serbian canoeist and Olympian (1980, 1984).
- Joel, 71, Brazilian association footballer.
- A. K. Salim, 80, American jazz composer, and arranger.
- Cyril Shaps, 79, British actor (The Pianist, Doctor Who, The Spy Who Loved Me).
- David Young, 72, British politician (Member of Parliament for Bolton East, Bolton South East).

=== 2 ===
- Pilar Bellosillo, 89, Spanish teacher and Catholic feminist.
- Edilberto Campadese, 87, Italian Olympic bobsledder (1948).
- Frank Cremeans, 59, American politician, respiratory failure.
- Hiralal Gaekwad, 79, Indian cricket player.
- Peter Harris, 77, British footballer.
- Leonia Janecka, 93, Polish painter and illustrator.
- Eric Jupp, 80, British-Australian musician, composer, arranger and conductor.
- Stanisław Kaźmierczak, 88, Polish footballer.
- Jack Keller, 80, American comic book artist.
- Bud Metheny, 87, American baseball player (New York Yankees).
- Sydney Omarr, 76, American astrologer and newspaper columnist, heart attack.
- Joe Ruetz, 86, American football player (Chicago Rockets), and coach.
- Bill Shelton, 73, British politician, Alzheimer's disease.
- Leroy Warriner, 83, American midget car racing driver (National Midget Auto Racing Hall of Fame).

=== 3 ===
- Sir James Ainsworth Campden Gabriel Eyre, 72, British Army general.
- Sid Gillman, 91, American football coach (San Diego Chargers) and member of the Pro Football Hall of Fame.
- José María Gironella, 85, Spanish author, stroke.
- Flóra Kádár, 74, Hungarian actress.
- Eddy Marnay, 82, French songwriter, singer.
- N. P. Mohammed, 74, Indian novelist, short story writer and screenwriter.
- Mohammad Mohsin, 60, Indian actor, director and producer.
- Edmund L. Morris, 79, Canadian politician, broadcaster and university administrator.
- Halima Nosirova, 89, Soviet and Uzbek singer.
- Joe Ostrowski, 86, American baseball player (St. Louis Browns, New York Yankees).
- Jim Westlake, 72, American baseball player (Philadelphia Phillies).
- Harry Willsie, 74, Canadian Olympic sports shooter (1964, 1968, 1972).
- Monique Wittig, 67, French writer, poet and social theorist, heart attack.

=== 4 ===
- Raoul Bortoletto, 77, Italian footballer.
- Hanno Drechsler, 71, German politician and mayor of Marburg.
- Henri Garnier, 94, Belgian road cyclist.
- Conrad Hall, 76, American cinematographer (American Beauty, Cool Hand Luke, Road to Perdition), Oscar winner (1970, 2000, 2003), bladder cancer.
- Yfrah Neaman, 79, Lebanese-British violinist and teacher.
- Louis Spector, 84, American judge (United States Court of Federal Claims).
- Lila Zali, 84, Georgian-American prima ballerina and ballet director.

=== 5 ===
- Maurice Boutel, 79, French film director, screenwriter and dialoguist.
- King Biscuit Boy, 58, Canadian blues musician.
- Buzz Busby, 69, American bluegrass mandolinist, songwriter and bandleader.
- Doreen Carwithen, 80, British composer of classical and film music.
- Massimo Girotti, 84, Italian film actor, heart attack.
- Johnny Harms, 77, Canadian ice hockey player (Chicago Black Hawks).
- Roy Jenkins, 82, British politician and biographer, heart attack.
- Jean Kerr, 80, American author and playwright, pneumonia.
- Félix Loustau, 80, Argentine football player.
- Daphne Oram, 77, British composer and musician.
- Sanders Sims, 81, American Olympic field hockey player (1948).

=== 6 ===
- Olle Bexell, 93, Swedish decathlete (Swedish champion: 1935 to 1938 decathlon, 1938 pentathlon), and Olympian (1936).
- Vic Bottari, 86, American college football player (California Golden Bears).
- Miriam Byrd-Nethery, 73, American actress.
- Gerald Cash, 85, Governor-General of the Bahamas.
- Glyn Davies, 83, Welsh economist.
- Peter de Smet, 58, Dutch comic-strip artist.
- Paula Pöhlsen, 89, German gymnast and Olympic champion (1936).
- Kari Skjønsberg, 76, Norwegian academic, writer and feminist.
- Jorma Taitto, 85, Finnish Olympic sports shooter (1956).
- Jarvis Tatum, 56, American baseball player (California Angels).
- Mamie Till, 81, American educator and civil rights activist.
- Philip Ward, 78, British army general.
- Harry Woolf, 79, American historian and academic, director of Institute for Advanced Study.

=== 7 ===
- Ed Albosta, 84, American baseball player (Brooklyn Dodgers, Pittsburgh Pirates).
- Ken Biddulph, 70, British cricketer.
- Vance Longden, 72, American thoroughbred horse trainer.
- Gordon Kidd Teal, 95, American electrical engineer.
- Mario Tonelli, 86, American football player (Chicago Cardinals).
- Wilfred Tull, 85, Trinidadian Olympic athlete (1948).
- Sebastian von Hoerner, 83, German astrophysicist and radio astronomer.
- Beatrice Willard, 77, American botanist, known for her research in alpine tundra ecosystems.

=== 8 ===
- Simeon Aké, 71, Ivorian politician.
- Fouad Abdel Meguid El-Kheir, 81, Egyptian basketball player and Olympian (1948, 1952).
- Dante "Tex" Gill, 72, American gangster and pimp.
- Ron Goodwin, 77, British film music composer and conductor, asthma.
- Sarah McClendon, 92, American journalist and White House reporter.
- Kir Nesis, 68, Russian marine biologist and malacologist, specialising in cephalopods.
- Reg Revans, 95, British professor, administrator, management consultant, and Olympic long jumper (1928).
- Angelo Romani, 68, Italian swimmer and Olympian (1952, 1956, 1960).
- Billy Van, 68, Canadian comedian, actor and singer (Nightcap, The Hilarious House of Frightenstein), lung cancer.

=== 9 ===
- Kurt Andersen, 104, German Luftwaffe general during World War II.
- Ignace Heinrich, 77, French Olympic athlete (1948).
- Elizabeth Irving, 98, British actress.
- Qamar Jalalabadi, 84, Indian poet and lyricist of songs for Hindi movies.
- Don Landrum, 66, American baseball player (Philadelphia Phillies, St. Louis Cardinals, Chicago Cubs, San Francisco Giants).
- Will McDonough, 67, American sportswriter for The Boston Globe, heart attack.
- Peter Tinniswood, 66, British writer, esophageal cancer.
- Penny Valentine, 59, British music journalist and critic, cancer.

=== 10 ===
- Júlio Botelho, 73, Brazilian football player, heart failure.
- C. Douglas Dillon, 93, American diplomat (U.S. Ambassador to France) and politician (Secretary of the Treasury, National Security Council).
- Wolfgang Kasack, 75, German Slavic studies scholar and translator.
- João Maio, 73, Brazilian Olympic rower (1952).
- Jorge "Lobito" Martínez, 50, Paraguayan musician, murdered.
- Ensio Siilasvuo, 81, Finnish general.
- Denis Zanette, 32, Italian professional racing cyclist, heart attack.

=== 11 ===
- Mickey Finn, 55, English musician and percussionist of T. Rex.
- Anthony Havelock-Allan, 98, British producer and screenwriter, heart attack.
- Virginia Kidd, 81, American literary agent, writer and editor.
- Bolesław Lewandowski, 67, Polish footballer.
- Ada Lunardoni, 91, American Olympic gymnast (1936).
- Bob Maertens, 72, Belgian footballer.
- Arne Månsson, 77, Swedish footballer.
- Silvanus Njambari, 28, Namibian footballer.
- Maurice Pialat, 77, French movie director, kidney failure.
- Jože Pučnik, 70, Slovenian intellectual, sociologist and politician.
- William Russo, 74, American composer, arranger, and musician.
- Richard Simmons, 89, American actor (Sergeant Preston of the Yukon), Alzheimer's disease.
- Abdullahi Aliyu Sumaila, 56, Nigerian politician and administrator.
- Yuri Tishkov, 31, Russian football player, sports agent and commentator, stabbed.

=== 12 ===
- Dean Amadon, 90, American ornithologist and an authority on birds of prey.
- Clarence H. Burns, 84, American politician, mayor of Baltimore in 1987.
- Jack Douglas, 72, Canadian ice hockey player and Olympian (1960).
- Kinji Fukasaku, 72, Japanese film director and screenwriter, prostate cancer.
- Leopoldo Fortunato Galtieri, 76, former dictator of Argentina, heart attack, pancreatic cancer.
- Maurice Gibb, 53, British band member of Bee Gees, heart attack.
- W. M. Gorman, 79, Irish economist and academic.
- Valentyn Kravchuk, 58, Ukrainian rower and Olympic medalist (1968).
- Alan Nunn May, 91, British nuclear physicist and convicted Soviet spy.
- Paul Pender, 72, American boxer and world middleweight champion.
- Koloman Sokol, 100, Slovak artist.
- Wang Tieya, 89, Chinese jurist and Judge of the International Criminal Tribunal for the Former Yugoslavia.

=== 13 ===
- James Bradshaw Adamson, 81, American U.S. Army major general, commander of the Military District of Washington.
- Elisabeth Croft, 95, English actress (Crossroads).
- Hertha Guthmar, 98, German film actress.
- Bob MacLeod, 85, American football player (Dartmouth Big Green, Chicago Bears).
- Norman Panama, 88, screenwriter and director, Parkinson's disease.
- Ernie Rudolph, 93, American baseball player (Brooklyn Dodgers).
- George Senick, 73, Canadian ice hockey player (New York Rangers).
- Erik Stadigh, 74, Finnish Olympic sailor (1952).

=== 14 ===
- Mirza Babayev, 89, Azerbaijani actor and singer.
- Mel Bourne, 79, American set designer and art director (Annie Hall, Fatal Attraction, Manhunter).
- Alberto Capilla, 76, Mexican Olympic diver (1952, 1956).
- Alan Edwards, 77, Australian actor.
- Monica Furlong, 72, British author, journalist, and activist, cancer.
- Eric Greenwood, 35, Costa Rican Olympic swimmer (1988).
- Dirk Karkuth, 41, German football manager.
- Vahé Katcha, 74, French Armenian author, screenwriter and journalist, heart attack.
- Georg Knepler, 96, Austrian pianist, conductor and musicologist.
- John Mantley, 82, Canadian theatrical actor, screenwriter and producer of television series, Gunsmoke, Alzheimer's disease.
- Paul Monash, 85, American television and film producer and screenwriter, pancreatic cancer.
- Sujit Mukherjee, 72, Indian writer, literary critic and publisher.
- Karl Rafreider, 85, Austrian Olympic cross-country skier (1948, 1952, 1956).
- Johnny Ritchey, 80, American baseball player.
- Emilio Villa, 88, Italian poet, visual artist, and biblical scholar.

=== 15 ===
- Eduardo Alquinta, 57, Chilean guitarist and vocalist (Los Jaivas), heart attack.
- Robert Bart, 72, French Olympic sprinter (1952).
- Linda Braidwood, 93, American archaeologist and pre-historian, influenza.
- Robert John Braidwood, 95, American archaeologist and anthropologist, a leading pioneer in prehistoric archaeology.
- Jeannette Campbell, 86, Scottish-Argentine swimmer and Olympian (1936).
- Frank Drea, 69, Canadian journalist, broadcaster, and politician, pneumonia.
- Doris Fisher, 87, American singer and songwriter ("Put the Blame on Mame", "You Always Hurt the One You Love").
- Ernesto Foldats, 77, Venezuelan botanist and orchidologist.
- Shimon Garidi, 90, Israeli politician.
- László Hidvégi, 86, Hungarian diver and Olympian (1936).
- Vivi-Anne Hultén, 91, Swedish figure skater and Olympian (1932, 1936), heart failure.
- Přemysl Kočí, 85, Czech operatic baritone, actor, stage director, and theatre manager.
- Derek Oatway, 72, Bermudian Olympic swimmer (1948).
- Eleanore Pettersen, 86, American architect.

=== 16 ===
- Shōtarō Akiyama, 82, Japanese photographer.
- Henryk Czyż, 79, Polish musician with a high reputation for conducting and teaching.
- Bruce Juddery, 61, Australian journalist.
- Phil McCullough, 85, American baseball player (Washington Senators).
- Chris Mead, 62, British ornithologist, author and broadcaster.
- Susie Bootja Bootja Napaltjarri, Australian indigenous artist.
- Ray Owen, 97, Australian agricultural scientist and politician.
- Hans Pietsch, 34, German professional Go player, shot during robbery.
- Richard Wainwright, 84, British politician (Member of Parliament for Colne Valley).

=== 17 ===
- Hylo Brown, 80, American bluegrass and country music singer, guitarist and bass player.
- Fritzi Burr, 78, American actress (Once Upon a Mattress, Funny Girl, Fiddler on the Roof).
- Bernice Claire, 96, American singer and actress, pneumonia.
- Richard Crenna, 76, American actor (First Blood, Summer Rental, The Real McCoys), Emmy winner (1985), heart failure.
- Herbert Crüger, 91, German communist and political activist.
- Goronwy Daniel, 88, Welsh academic and civil servant.
- George Haimsohn, 77, American writer and photographer, aneurysm.
- Alfredo Hernández, 67, Mexican footballer.
- Sao Nang Hearn Kham, 86, First Lady of Myanmar as wife of Sao Shwe Thaik.
- Leon Lyon, 84, Puerto Rican Olympic sports shooter (1960, 1964).

=== 18 ===
- Harivansh Rai Bachchan, 95, Indian poet.
- Ed Farhat, 76, Lebanese-American wrestler, heart failure.
- Virginia Heinlein, 86, American chemist, biochemist and engineer.
- Joe Kruse, 88, American basketball player.
- Gavin Lyall, 70, English author of espionage thrillers, cancer.
- Stefan Sundelin, 66, Swedish sailor and Olympian (1976).

=== 19 ===
- Milton Flores, 28, Honduran football player, shot.
- Françoise Giroud, 86, French journalist, screenwriter, writer and politician, heart attack.
- Joy Hodges, 87, American singer and actress.
- Morris Kight, 83, American gay rights pioneer and peace activist.
- Maxime Matsima, 62, Congolese footballer.
- L. D. Meyer, 87, American baseball player (Chicago Cubs, Detroit Tigers, Cleveland Indians) and manager.
- Sayed Moukhtar, 81, Egyptian Olympic athlete (1948).
- Russell A. Rourke, 71, American lawyer and public official.
- Alfredo Zalce, 95, Mexican artist and muralist.

=== 20 ===
- Eldar Muhtarovics Azim-Zagye, 68, Soviet-Azerbaijani football referee.
- David Battley, 67, British actor (Willy Wonka & the Chocolate Factory, Krull, Relative Strangers), heart attack.
- Millie Cheater, 75, Canadian Olympic sprinter (1948).
- John Federovitch, 85, American football player (Chicago Bears).
- Sir Stanley Fingland, 83, British diplomat.
- Skarphéðinn Guðmundsson, 72, Icelandic Olympic ski jumper (1960).
- Al Hirschfeld, 99, American caricaturist.
- Gusztáv Juhász, 91, Hungarian -Romanian football player and coach.
- Craig Kelly, 36, American snowboarder, avalanche.
- Dan King, 72, American basketball player (Western Kentucky Hilltoppers, Baltimore Bullets).
- Abraham Klein, 76, American theoretical physicist.
- Edith Lefel, 39, French singer, infarction.
- Sadatsugu Matsuda, 96, Japanese film director, senility.
- Nedra Volz, 94, American actress (Diff'rent Strokes, The Dukes of Hazzard, Filthy Rich, The Fall Guy), cancer.
- Bill Werbeniuk, 56, Canadian snooker player, heart failure.

=== 21 ===
- Irene Diamond, 92, American Hollywood talent scout and philanthropist.
- Paul Haines, 70, American poet and jazz lyricist.
- Eddie Johnson, 43, American football player (Cleveland Browns).
- Paul Kuusberg, 86, Estonian writer.
- Obert Logan, 61, American football player (Trinity University, Dallas Cowboys, New Orleans Saints), colon cancer.
- Antonio Domínguez Ortiz, 93, Spanish historian.
- Tommy Wood, 90, British Grand Prix motorcycle road racer.
- Khin Hnin Yu, 77, Burmese writer, spokesperson for Prime Minister U Nu.

=== 22 ===
- Marvin Bower, 99, American management consultant, considered the father of modern management consulting.
- Richard Buchanan, 90, British politician (Member of Parliament for Glasgow Springburn).
- Gopal Chhotray, 86, Indian dramatist and playwright.
- Werner Dissel, 90, German actor, director, and resistance fighter during World War II.
- Dick Fugler, 71, American football player (Pittsburgh Steelers, Chicago Cardinals).
- Lonny Kellner, 72, German singer and actress, cancer.
- Ernst Kitzinger, 90, German-American art historian.
- Erm Lund, 88, Estonian Olympic weightlifter (1936).
- Bill Mauldin, 81, American cartoonist during World War II, Alzheimer's disease.
- Tan Qilong, 90, Chinese politician.
- Peter Russell, 81, British poet.
- Fred M. Winner, 90, American district judge (United States District Court for the District of Colorado).
- Jean-François Zevaco, 86, French-Moroccan architect.

=== 23 ===
- Anne Meredith Barry, 70, Canadian artist, known for her landscapes of Newfoundland and Labrador.
- Nell Carter, 54, American singer, actress (Gimme a Break!, Hangin' with Mr. Cooper, The Grass Harp), diabetes.
- Stanley J. Davis, 94, American politician.
- Yaroslav Krestovsky, 78, Soviet Russian painter.
- Tore Lindzén, 88, Swedish Olympic water polo player (1936).
- Johnny Mauro, 92, American racecar driver.
- David Moore, 75, Australian photojournalist.

=== 24 ===
- Gianni Agnelli, 81, Italian entrepreneur and president of Fiat, prostate cancer.
- Lucien E. Blackwell, 71, American politician (U.S. Representative for Pennsylvania's 2nd congressional district).
- Ivor Broom, 82, British air marshal and bomber pilot during World War II.
- Rolf Kirkvaag, 82, Norwegian journalist, and a radio- and TV personality.
- Henri Krasucki, 78, French trade-unionist, secretary general of General Confederation of Labour (1982-1992).
- Sabotage, 29, Brazilian rapper and songwriter, homicide.
- Cy Touff, 75, American jazz bass trumpeter.
- Bobbi Trout, 97, American pioneer aviator, cardiovascular disease.
- Cor van Hout, 45, Dutch criminal known for the kidnapping of Freddy Heineken, homicide.

=== 25 ===
- Toby Atwell, 78, American baseball player (Chicago Cubs, Pittsburgh Pirates, Milwaukee Braves).
- Diana Gould, 90, British dancer and widow of Yehudi Menuhin.
- Sidney Hatfield, 73, American baseball player.
- Frank L. Hays, 81, American politician.
- Cliff Norton, 84, American actor (The Ed Sullivan Show, Caesar's Hour, Harry and Tonto, Funny Lady).
- Jack Rasmussen, 79, Danish Olympic wrestler (1952).
- Sheldon Reynolds, 79, American television producer.
- Robert Rockwell, 82, American actor (Our Miss Brooks, Growing Pains, Lassie), cancer.
- Krishna Mohan Shrestha, Nepalese police officer, Inspector General of the Armed Police Force (since 2001), shot.
- Leopoldo Trieste, 85, Italian actor, film director and script writer, heart attack.
- Joseph A. Walker, 67, American director, actor, and playwright (Tony Award for Best Play for The River Niger).
- Stanley Wudyka, 92, American Olympic long-distance runner (1936).

=== 26 ===
- John Browning, 69, American pianist, winner of two Grammy Awards: 1991, 1993.
- Valeriy Brumel, 60, Soviet high jumper and Olympian (1960, 1964).
- Lars-Erik Efverström, 77, Swedish Olympic Nordic skier (1952).
- Jeffrey K. Hadden, 66, American professor of sociology, pancreatic cancer.
- Erik Kalugin, 65, Soviet Russian Olympic canoeist (1964).
- George Younger, 4th Viscount Younger of Leckie, 71, British politician, Secretary of State for Scotland 1979–1986, cancer.
- Don Lurio, 73, American-Italian dancer, choreographer and TV presenter.
- Harold Manning, 94, American long-distance runner and Olympian (1936).
- Jim McConnon, 80, English cricket player.
- Vladimir Mulyavin, 62, Belarusian and Russian rock musician, complications after car accident.
- Fred Russell, 96, American sports writer.
- Annemarie Schimmel, 80, German orientalist and scholar.
- Hugh Trevor-Roper, 89, English historian, esophageal cancer.

=== 27 ===
- Louis Archambault, 87, Canadian sculptor.
- Maurice Ash, 85, British environmentalist, writer and administrator.
- Henryk Jabłoński, 93, Polish historian and politician.
- Lajoš Jakovetić, 80, Serbian and Yugoslavia football player and manager.
- Bob Kammeyer, 52, American baseball player (New York Yankees), pulmonary embolism.

=== 28 ===
- Ryszard Lubicki, 66, Polish Olympic rower (1964).
- Miloš Milutinović, 69, Serbian footballer and manager.
- Mieke Pullen, 45, Dutch long-distance runner, traffic collision.
- Emília Rotter, 96, Hungarian figure skater and Olympian (1932, 1936).
- Vladimir Vasilyev, 67, Soviet Olympic sailor (1972, 1976).
- Edward Preston Young, 89, British graphic designer, submariner, writer (One Of Our Submarines).

=== 29 ===
- Ihsan Abbas, 82, Palestinian professor.
- Douglas Allanbrook, 81, American composer, pianist and harpsichordist.
- Mohamed Ahmed Aly, 82-83, Egyptian Olympic sports shooter (1952).
- Pandari Bai, 73, Indian actress.
- Silvio Confortola, 93, Italian cross-country skier and Olympian (1948).
- George Dews, 81, English cricketer.
- Natalia Dudinskaya, 90, Soviet prima ballerina.
- Anthony Eisley, 78, American actor, heart attack.
- Leslie Fiedler, 85, American literary critic.
- Harold Kelley, 81, American social psychologist and academic.
- Frank Moss, 91, American lawyer and politician, US Senator from Utah.
- John Murphy, 78, American basketball player (Philadelphia Warriors, New York Knicks).
- Peter Shaw, 84, British actor and producer; husband of Angela Lansbury, heart attack.
- Yevgeniya Sidorova, 72, Russian alpine skier and Olympic medalist (1956, 1960, 1964).
- Alan Walker, 91, Australian theologian.
- Lee Yoo-hyung, 92, Korean football player, manager, and Olympian (1948).

=== 30 ===
- Clyde Dickey, 51, American basketball player (Utah Stars).
- Mary Ellis, 105, American actress and singer (Rose-Marie, Music in the Air).
- Cary Leeds, 45, American tennis player.
- Paul-André Meyer, 68, French mathematician.
- Zdzisław Starzyński, 70, Polish Olympic field hockey player (1952).
- Joan Franks Williams, 72, American composer, complications from Parkinson's disease.

=== 31 ===
- Horace Hahn, 87, American actor.
- William Marlowe, 72, British actor.
- Guy Rabstejnek, 78, French footballer and Olympian (1948).
- Werenfried van Straaten, 90, Dutch Roman Catholic priest and social activist.
- John Westergaard, 71, American investment manager.
