= Wrestling at the 1952 Summer Olympics – Men's freestyle lightweight =

Wrestling at the Olympics

Men's freestyle lightweight at the Games of the XV Olympiad
- Venue: Messuhalli
- Dates: 20–23 July 1952
- Competitors: 23 from 23 nations

Medalists
1st place, gold medalist(s)		Olle Anderberg	Sweden
2nd place, silver medalist(s)		Tommy Evans	United States
3rd place, bronze medalist(s)		Tofigh Jahanbakht	Iran

The men's freestyle lightweight competition at the 1952 Summer Olympics in Helsinki took place from 20 July to 23 July at Messuhalli. Nations were limited to one competitor. Lightweight was the fourth-lightest category, including wrestlers weighing 62 to 67 kilograms (136.7 to 147.7 lb).

== Competition format ==
This freestyle wrestling competition continued to use the "bad points" elimination system introduced at the 1928 Summer Olympics for Greco-Roman and at the 1932 Summer Olympics for freestyle wrestling, removing the slight modification introduced in 1936 and used until 1948 (which had a reduced penalty for a loss by 2–1 decision). Each round featured all wrestlers pairing off and wrestling one bout (with one wrestler having a bye if there were an odd number). The loser received 3 points. The winner received 1 point if the win was by decision and 0 points if the win was by fall. At the end of each round, any wrestler with at least 5 points was eliminated. This elimination continued until the medal rounds, which began when 3 wrestlers remained. These 3 wrestlers each faced each other in a round-robin medal round (with earlier results counting, if any had wrestled another before); record within the medal round determined medals, with bad points breaking ties.

== Results ==
=== Round 1 ===
Bouts

Winner	Nation	Victory Type	Loser	Nation
Tevfik Yüce	Turkey	Decision, 3–0	Ray Myland	Great Britain
Tofigh Jahanbakht	Iran	Decision, 3–0	József Gál	Hungary
Heini Nettesheim	Germany	Fall	O Tae-geun	South Korea
Osvaldo Blasi	Argentina	Fall	Arístides Pérez	Guatemala
Dick Garrard	Australia	Decision, 3–0	Jack Vard	Ireland
Tommy Evans	United States	Decision, 3–0	Mohamed Badr	Egypt
Takeo Shimotori	Japan	Decision, 3–0	Bjørn Larsson	Norway
Jan Cools	Belgium	Decision, 3–0	Mario Tovar	Mexico
Garibaldo Nizzola	Italy	Decision, 3–0	Erik Østrand	Denmark
Olle Anderberg	Sweden	Fall	Armenak Yaltyryan	Soviet Union
Risto Talosela	Finland	Fall	Paul Besson	Switzerland
Blondie Pienaar	South Africa	Bye	N/A	N/A

Points

Rank	Wrestler	Nation	Start	Earned	Total
1	Olle Anderberg	Sweden	0	0	0
1	Osvaldo Blasi	Argentina	0	0	0
1	Heini Nettesheim	Germany	0	0	0
1	Blondie Pienaar	South Africa	0	0	0
1	Risto Talosela	Finland	0	0	0
6	Jan Cools	Belgium	0	1	1
6	Tommy Evans	United States	0	1	1
6	Dick Garrard	Australia	0	1	1
6	Garibaldo Nizzola	Italy	0	1	1
6	Takeo Shimotori	Japan	0	1	1
6	Tofigh Jahanbakht	Iran	0	1	1
6	Tevfik Yüce	Turkey	0	1	1
13	Mohamed Badr	Egypt	0	3	3
13	Paul Besson	Switzerland	0	3	3
13	József Gál	Hungary	0	3	3
13	Bjørn Larsson	Norway	0	3	3
13	Ray Myland	Great Britain	0	3	3
13	O Tae-geun	South Korea	0	3	3
13	Erik Østrand	Denmark	0	3	3
13	Arístides Pérez	Guatemala	0	3	3
13	Mario Tovar	Mexico	0	3	3
13	Jack Vard	Ireland	0	3	3
13	Armenak Yaltyryan	Soviet Union	0	3	3

=== Round 2 ===
Nizzola withdrew after his bout.

Bouts

Winner	Nation	Victory Type	Loser	Nation
Tevfik Yüce	Turkey	Decision, 3–0	Blondie Pienaar	South Africa
Tofigh Jahanbakht	Iran	Fall	Ray Myland	Great Britain
József Gál	Hungary	Decision, 3–0	O Tae-geun	South Korea
Heini Nettesheim	Germany	Fall	Arístides Pérez	Guatemala
Dick Garrard	Australia	Decision, 3–0	Osvaldo Blasi	Argentina
Tommy Evans	United States	Fall	Jack Vard	Ireland
Takeo Shimotori	Japan	Decision, 3–0	Mohamed Badr	Egypt
Jan Cools	Belgium	Fall	Bjørn Larsson	Norway
Erik Østrand	Denmark	Decision, 3–0	Mario Tovar	Mexico
Olle Anderberg	Sweden	Decision, 3–0	Garibaldo Nizzola	Italy
Armenak Yaltyryan	Soviet Union	Fall	Risto Talosela	Finland
Paul Besson	Switzerland	Bye	N/A	N/A

Points

Rank	Wrestler	Nation	Start	Earned	Total
1	Heini Nettesheim	Germany	0	0	0
2	Olle Anderberg	Sweden	0	1	1
2	Jan Cools	Belgium	1	0	1
2	Tommy Evans	United States	1	0	1
2	Tofigh Jahanbakht	Iran	1	0	1
6	Dick Garrard	Australia	1	1	2
6	Takeo Shimotori	Japan	1	1	2
6	Tevfik Yüce	Turkey	1	1	2
9	Paul Besson	Switzerland	3	0	3
9	Osvaldo Blasi	Argentina	0	3	3
9	Blondie Pienaar	South Africa	0	3	3
9	Risto Talosela	Finland	0	3	3
9	Armenak Yaltyryan	Soviet Union	3	0	3
14	József Gál	Hungary	3	1	4
14	Erik Østrand	Denmark	3	1	4
16	Garibaldo Nizzola	Italy	1	3	4*
17	Mohamed Badr	Egypt	3	3	6
17	Bjørn Larsson	Norway	3	3	6
17	Ray Myland	Great Britain	3	3	6
17	O Tae-geun	South Korea	3	3	6
17	Arístides Pérez	Guatemala	3	3	6
17	Mario Tovar	Mexico	3	3	6
17	Jack Vard	Ireland	3	3	6

=== Round 3 ===
Bouts

Winner	Nation	Victory Type	Loser	Nation
Blondie Pienaar	South Africa	Decision, 3–0	Paul Besson	Switzerland
Tofigh Jahanbakht	Iran	Decision, 2–1	Tevfik Yüce	Turkey
József Gál	Hungary	Decision, 2–1	Heini Nettesheim	Germany
Tommy Evans	United States	Decision, 3–0	Osvaldo Blasi	Argentina
Takeo Shimotori	Japan	Decision, 3–0	Dick Garrard	Australia
Olle Anderberg	Sweden	Fall	Jan Cools	Belgium
Armenak Yaltyryan	Soviet Union	Decision, 3–0	Erik Østrand	Denmark
Risto Talosela	Finland	Bye	N/A	N/A

Points

Rank	Wrestler	Nation	Start	Earned	Total
1	Olle Anderberg	Sweden	1	0	1
2	Tommy Evans	United States	1	1	2
2	Tofigh Jahanbakht	Iran	1	1	2
4	Heini Nettesheim	Germany	0	3	3
4	Takeo Shimotori	Japan	2	1	3
4	Risto Talosela	Finland	3	0	3
7	Jan Cools	Belgium	1	3	4
7	Blondie Pienaar	South Africa	3	1	4
7	Armenak Yaltyryan	Soviet Union	3	1	4
10	József Gál	Hungary	4	1	5
10	Dick Garrard	Australia	2	3	5
10	Tevfik Yüce	Turkey	2	3	5
13	Paul Besson	Switzerland	3	3	6
13	Osvaldo Blasi	Argentina	3	3	6
15	Erik Østrand	Denmark	4	3	7

=== Round 4 ===
Bouts

Winner	Nation	Victory Type	Loser	Nation
Risto Talosela	Finland	Decision, 3–0	Blondie Pienaar	South Africa
Tofigh Jahanbakht	Iran	Decision, 2–1	Heini Nettesheim	Germany
Tommy Evans	United States	Fall	Jan Cools	Belgium
Olle Anderberg	Sweden	Fall	Takeo Shimotori	Japan
Armenak Yaltyryan	Soviet Union	Bye	N/A	N/A

Points

Rank	Wrestler	Nation	Start	Earned	Total
1	Olle Anderberg	Sweden	1	0	1
2	Tommy Evans	United States	2	0	2
3	Tofigh Jahanbakht	Iran	2	1	3
4	Risto Talosela	Finland	3	1	4
4	Armenak Yaltyryan	Soviet Union	4	0	4
6	Heini Nettesheim	Germany	3	3	6
6	Takeo Shimotori	Japan	3	3	6
8	Jan Cools	Belgium	4	3	7
8	Blondie Pienaar	South Africa	4	3	7

=== Round 5 ===
Yaltyryan finished 4th over Talosela due to their head-to-head match in round 2.

Bouts

Winner	Nation	Victory Type	Loser	Nation
Tofigh Jahanbakht	Iran	Decision, 3–0	Armenak Yaltyryan	Soviet Union
Tommy Evans	United States	Fall	Risto Talosela	Finland
Olle Anderberg	Sweden	Bye	N/A	N/A

Points

Rank	Wrestler	Nation	Start	Earned	Total
1	Olle Anderberg	Sweden	1	0	1
2	Tommy Evans	United States	2	0	2
3	Tofigh Jahanbakht	Iran	3	1	4
4	Armenak Yaltyryan	Soviet Union	4	3	7
5	Risto Talosela	Finland	4	3	7

=== Medal rounds ===
None of the three medalists had faced other, so each wrestled both of the others. Anderberg won both of his matches, taking gold. Evans, having lost to Anderberg, beat Jahanbakht to take silver. Jahanbakht finished with the bronze at 0–2 against the other medalists.

Bouts

Winner	Nation	Victory Type	Loser	Nation
Olle Anderberg	Sweden	Decision, 3–0	Tofigh Jahanbakht	Iran
Olle Anderberg	Sweden	Decision, 2–1	Tommy Evans	United States
Tommy Evans	United States	Decision, 3–0	Tofigh Jahanbakht	Iran

Points

Rank	Wrestler	Nation	Wins	Losses	Start	Earned	Total
1st place, gold medalist(s)	Olle Anderberg	Sweden	2	0	1	2	3
2nd place, silver medalist(s)	Tommy Evans	United States	1	1	2	4	6
3rd place, bronze medalist(s)	Tofigh Jahanbakht	Iran	0	2	4	6	10
