= Deaths in August 2005 =

The following is a list of notable deaths in August 2005.

Entries for each day are listed alphabetically by surname. A typical entry lists information in the following sequence:

- Name, age, country of citizenship at birth, subsequent country of citizenship (if applicable), reason for notability, cause of death (if known), and reference.

== August 2005 ==
=== 1 ===
- Al Aronowitz, 77, American music journalist, cancer.
- Donald Brooks, 77, American Hollywood and Broadway costume designer, heart attack.
- William Hugh Clifford Frend, 89, English ecclesiastical historian.
- Jeannou Lacaze, 81, French Army general who also served in the French Foreign Legion.
- Anne-Marie Marchand, 78, French costume designer.
- Colin McEvedy, 75, British polymath scholar, psychiatrist, historian, and non-fiction author.
- Milt Nielsen, 80, American baseball player (Cleveland Indians).
- Constant Nieuwenhuys, 85, Dutch COBRA painter.
- Fahd bin Abdulaziz Al Saud, 84, Saudi Arabian King, complications of a stroke.
- David Shaw, 62, American journalist, Los Angeles Times writer and Pulitzer Prize winner, brain tumor.
- Julien Vandierendounck, 84, Belgian footballer.

=== 2 ===
- Sandro Bolchi, 81, Italian director and journalist.
- Alfredo Corvino, 89, Uruguayan ballet dancer and ballet teacher.
- Rainer Forss, 74, Finnish football player, manager, coach, and Olympian (1952).
- Milt Graff, 74, American baseball player (Kansas City Athletics).
- Jay Hammond, 83, American politician, Governor of Alaska from 1975 to 1982.
- Tuukka Mäkelä, 77, Finnish Olympic sports shooter (1968).
- Loulie Jean Norman, 92, American soprano.
- Rudolf Tajcnár, 57, Czechoslovak ice hockey player (Edmonton Oilers), and Olympian (1972).
- Steven Vincent, 49, American freelance reporter, shot.
- Shlomo Zev Zweigenhaft, 89, German-American Hasidic rabbi and Holocaust survivor.

=== 3 ===
- Luis Barbero, 88, Spanish actor, heart attack.
- Françoise d'Eaubonne, 85, French writer.
- Alastair Duncan, 79, English-Australian actor, playwright, producer and director.
- Dick Heyward, 90, Australian longtime deputy director of UNICEF.
- William J. Rea, 85, American district judge (United States District Court for the Central District of California).
- Ernest Smith, 91, Canadian Victoria Cross recipient.
- Dominic Aloysius Vendargon, 95, Sri Lankan priest and Roman Catholic Archbishop of Kuala Lumpur.

=== 4 ===
- Charles Alden Black, 86, American businessman, husband of Shirley Temple, myelodysplastic syndrome.
- Mary Dees, 93, American actress.
- Ken Fish, 91, South African football player.
- Ileen Getz, 43, American actress (3rd Rock From The Sun, Changing Lanes, The Station Agent), cancer.
- Sue Gunter, 66, American women's basketball coach, pulmonary emphysema.
- Anatoly Larkin, 72, Russian theoretical physicist.
- Little Milton, 71, American blues musician, stroke.
- Bernardo Romero Pereiro, 61, Colombian actor, director, and writer, respiratory failure.
- Nick Perito, 81, American conductor, composer and arranger, pulmonary fibrosis.
- Johan Runge, 81, Danish weightlifter and Olympian (1948, 1952).
- Iván Szabó, 71, Hungarian politician.
- Eden Natan-Zada, 19, Israeli deserter soldier.

=== 5 ===
- Polina Astakhova, 68, Soviet Ukrainian five time Olympic gymnastic champion (1956, 1960, 1964).
- Fritze Carstensen, 80, Danish swimmer and Olympic silver medalist (1948).
- Bertie Hill, 78, British equestrian and Olympic champion (1952, 1956, 1960).
- Cal Hogue, 77, American baseball player (Pittsburgh Pirates).
- Raymond Klibansky, 99, German-Canadian academic and philosopher.
- Jane Lawrence, 90, American actress also associated with 1950s art scene.
- Spud Murphy, 96, American jazz multi-instrumentalist, bandleader, and arranger.
- Jim O'Hora, 90, American college football coach.
- Raul Roco, 63, Filipino politician, former senator and presidential candidate, cancer.
- Roy Scott, 88, New Zealand cricketer.

=== 6 ===
- Nikolay Abramov, 55, Russian footballer, heart attack.
- Leonardo Rodríguez Alcaine, 86, Mexican trade union leader.
- Vizma Belševica, 74, Latvian poet.
- Keter Betts, 77, American jazz bassist.
- Robin Cook, 59, British Member of Parliament, former Foreign Secretary, hypertensive heart disease.
- Ibrahim Ferrer, 78, Afro-Cuban musician, singer in the Buena Vista Social Club, multiple organ dysfunction syndrome.
- Louis Gauthier, 89, French cyclist.
- John R. Isbell, 74, American mathematician.
- Rita Keller, 72, American baseball player.
- Carlo Little, 66, British drummer, lung cancer.
- Valentin Nikulin, 73, Soviet, Russian and Israeli theater and film actor, cancer.
- James Wilson, 82, Irish composer.

=== 7 ===
- Leni Alexander, 81, German-born Chilean composer.
- Alejandro Armendáriz, 82, Argentinian physician and politician, accident.
- Paul Arnaud de Foïar, 83, French Army general.
- Peter Jennings, 67, Canadian-American correspondent, news anchor of ABC News, complications from lung cancer.
- Li Lili, 90, Chinese film actress and singer.
- Sven Methling, 86, Danish film director and screenwriter.
- Noel Nicola, 58, Cuban singer-songwriter and co-founder of the nueva trova movement, cancer.
- Mikhail Yevdokimov, 47, Russian comedian and politician, car accident.
- Ester Šimerová-Martinčeková, 96, Slovak painter, scenic designer and journalist.

=== 8 ===
- Robert A. Baker, 84, American psychologist, writer and UFO skeptic.
- Harry Boatswain, 36, American football player (San Francisco 49ers, Philadelphia Eagles, New York Jets).
- Ahmed Deedat, 80, South African Muslim preacher.
- Nicolae Dumitru, 76, Romanian football player and manager.
- Barbara Bel Geddes, 82, American actress (Cat on a Hot Tin Roof, Dallas, Vertigo), lung cancer.
- John H. Johnson, 87, American publisher.
- Paul Le Person, 74, French actor of Breton origin.
- Gene Mauch, 79, American Major League Baseball manager, lung cancer.
- Nikolai Puchkov, 75, Russian ice hockey goaltender and Olympian (1956, 1960).
- Monica Sjöö, 66, Swedish- British-based painter, writer and eco-feminist, cancer.
- Pauli Vesterinen, 82, Finnish Olympic javelin thrower (1948).
- Trần Quốc Vượng, 70, Vietnamese historian, archaeologist, and culturologist.
- Ilse Werner, 84, German actress, pneumonia.

=== 9 ===
- Colette Besson, 59, French athlete and Olympic 400m champion runner (1968, 1972), lung cancer.
- Dorris Bowdon, 90, American actress, stroke, heart attack.
- Al Carmines, 69, American musician.
- Marco Cavagna, 46-47, Italian astronomer, stroke.
- François Dalle, 87, French entrepreneur, CEO of L'Oréal cosmetics.
- Stanley DeSantis, 52, American actor (Ed Wood, The Aviator, Candyman), heart attack.
- Abraham Hirschfeld, 85, Polish-American real estate investor and Broadway producer, cancer.
- Detroit Junior, 73, American blues pianist, vocalist and songwriter.
- Philip J. Klass, 85, American aviation journalist and UFO sceptic, cancer.
- Matthew McGrory, 32, American actor (Big Fish, The Devil's Rejects, House of 1000 Corpses), heart failure.
- Judith Rossner, 70, American author (Looking for Mr. Goodbar), diabetes and cancer.
- Nikolay Serebryakov, 76, Russian film director.
- Kay Tremblay, 91, Canadian actress (Road to Avonlea).

=== 10 ===
- Mar Amongo, 68, Filipino comic book artist.
- Jaroslav Koutecký, 83, Czech physical chemist.
- Roy Marlin Voris, 85, American Navy Captain, World War II flying ace, founder of the US Navy Blue Angels.
- Masahiro Yamada, 74, Japanese screenwriter, lung cancer.

=== 11 ===
- Ernesta Ballard, 85, American horticulturist and feminist.
- James Booth, 77, British actor (Zulu).
- Yves Brasseur, 62, Belgian Olympic fencer (1964, 1968).
- Erkko Kivikoski, 69, Finnish film director and screenwriter.
- Manfred Korfmann, 63, German archaeologist, lung cancer.
- Francisco Lesmes, 81, Spanish footballer.
- Ted Radcliffe, 103, American Negro leagues baseball player, cancer.

=== 12 ===
- Francy Boland, 75, Belgian jazz pianist, composer, and arranger.
- Robert Bonner, 84, Canadian politician and businessman.
- Teruo Ishii, 81, Japanese movie maker, lung cancer.
- Lakshman Kadirgamar, 73, Sri Lankan foreign minister, homicide.
- John Loder, 59, English sound engineer and record producer, brain cancer.
- Charlie Norman, 84, Swedish jazz pianist and film music writer, cancer.
- Julian Stanley, 87, American psychologist, "Champion of Gifted Students".
- Morciré Sylla, 57, Guinean footballer and Olympian (1968).
- Jan Szymański, 45, Polish Olympic wrestler (1980).
- Jack A. Wolfe, 69, American paleobotanist and paleoclimatologist.

=== 13 ===
- Miguel Arraes, 88, Brazilian politician, governor of Pernambuco.
- Wladimiro Calarese, 74, Italian fencer and Olympic medalist (1960, 1964, 1968).
- George Carpenter, 96, Irish Olympic fencer (1952, 1960).
- Edgar Chacón, 60, Guatemalan footballer and Olympian (1968).
- Arnold Cooke, 98, British composer.
- George Daniels, 55, Ghanaian Olympic sprinter (1972).
- Armand Deutsch, 92, American film producer and grandson of philanthropist Julius Rosenwald.
- William Jennings Bryan Dorn, 89, American politician, U.S. Representative from South Carolina (1947–1949 and 1951–1974).
- Domenico Grosso, 83, Italian Olympic gymnast (1948).
- David Lange, 63, New Zealand politician, Prime Minister (1984-1989), kidney failure.
- Donald Shively, 84, American japanologist and academic, Shy–Drager syndrome.
- Chris Tolos, 75, Canadian professional wrestler, cancer.
- André Verdaine, 82, French Olympic wrestler (1952).

=== 14 ===
- Stephen C. Apostolof, 78, Bulgarian-American filmmaker.
- Viktor Dmitryevich Baranov, 77, Soviet Russian Olympic cross-country skier (1956).
- Denny Crawford, 84, American football player (Tennessee Volunteers, New York Yankees).
- Petre Libardi, 62, Romanian footballer.
- Coo Coo Marlin, 73, American NASCAR driver, lung cancer.
- Billy More, 40, Italian drag queen music artist, leukemia.
- Gordon Oakes, 74, British politician, Labour government minister and member of the Privy Council of the United Kingdom, cancer.
- Sheila Piercey Summers, 86, South African tennis player.
- Beverly Wolff, 76, American mezzo-soprano.

=== 15 ===
- Franz Bumann, 80, Swiss Olympic alpine skier (1952).
- Laura Carli, 99, Italian actress and dubber.
- Anatoly Demitkov, 77, Soviet canoeist and Olympic silver medalist (1956).
- James Dougherty, 84, American police officer, first husband of actress Marilyn Monroe, leukemia.
- Karen Inge Halkier, 68, Danish Olympic discus thrower (1960).
- Peter Smit, 43, Dutch martial artist, former European and world champion kickboxer, shot.
- Viktor Spasov, 46, Soviet pole vaulter.
- Evelyn Stokes, 68, New Zealand geographer and writer.
- Gladys Strum, 99, Canadian politician, member of the House of Commons of Canada (1945-1949).
- Herta Ware, 88, American actress (Cocoon, Cruel Intentions, Species), Parkinson's disease.
- Earl Zindars, 77, American composer of jazz and classical music.

=== 16 ===
- Karl-Erik Andersson, 78, Swedish football player and Olympian (1952).
- Vassar Clements, 77, American fiddle player and bluegrass musician, lung cancer.
- Tonino Delli Colli, 81, Italian cinematographer (The Good, the Bad and the Ugly, Once Upon a Time in the West, Once Upon a Time in America), heart attack.
- William Corlett, 66, English author, cancer.
- Subal Das, 76, Bangladeshi music director, composer and football player.
- Alexander Gomelsky, 77, Soviet and Russian basketball player and coach, cancer.
- Þorsteinn Gylfason, 63, Icelandic philosopher, musician and poet, stomach cancer.
- Al Hollingworth, 86, Canadian politician, member of the House of Commons of Canada (1953-1957).
- Jay Jackson, 86, American radio and television quiz show host and announcer, pneumonia.
- Milorad Pavić, 83, Serbian football player and coach.
- Joe Ranft, 45, American animator, screenwriter and voice actor (Toy Story, A Bug's Life, Finding Nemo), car accident.
- Eva Renzi, 60, German actress, cancer.
- Brother Roger, 90, Swiss Christian leader and monk, founder of the Taizé Community, stabbed.
- Ray Gene Smith, 76, American football player (Chicago Bears).
- Derek Page, Baron Whaddon, 77, British politician.

=== 17 ===
- Richard Altham, 81, English cricketer.
- John N. Bahcall, 70, American astrophysicist.
- Dottie Hunter, 89, Canadian baseball player (All-American Girls Professional Baseball League).
- Lloyd Meeds, 77, American politician, US Representative from Washington (1965–1979), lung cancer.
- Bertram L. Podell, 79, American politician, US Representative from New York (1967–1975).

=== 18 ===
- Fred Carrillo, 78-79, Filipino comic artist.
- Chri$ Ca$h, 23, American professional wrestler, motorcycle accident.
- Kenyon Jones, 27, American basketball player, heart attack.
- Viktor Kudynskyi, 63, Soviet Ukrainian Olympic steeplechase runner (1968).
- Andrónico Lukšić, 78, Croatian-Chilean billionaire businessman, cancer.
- Krzysztof Raczkowski, 34, Polish drummer (Vader), heart failure.
- Elza Radziņa, 88, Soviet and Latvian theater and cinema actress, and a master of the spoken word.

=== 19 ===
- Mansour F. Armaly, 78, Palestinian ophthalmologist and early glaucoma researcher, cancer.
- Aušra Augustinavičiūtė, 78, Lithuanian psychologist.
- Val Bird, 77, Australian politician.
- Michael Collins, 81, American mystery novelist.
- Abraham Bueno de Mesquita, 87, Dutch comedian, cancer.
- Faimalaga Luka, 65, Tuvaluan politician, prime minister (2001) and governor-general (2003-2005).
- O. Madhavan, 83, Indian actor and director.
- Mo Mowlam, 55, British politician, complications after a fall.
- Oscar Muller, 48, Argentine football player, traffic accident.
- Mel Welles, 81, American actor, writer, director.

=== 20 ===
- Abraham Samuel Goldstein, 80, American law professor, former dean of Yale Law School, heart attack.
- Thomas Herrion, 23, American NFL player with the San Francisco 49ers, ischemic heart disease.
- Miljenko Kovačić, 32, Croatian soccer player, motorcycle accident.
- Julius Curtis Lewis, Jr., 79, American businessman and philanthropist.
- Clifford Williams, 78, British theatre director.

=== 21 ===
- Liv Aasen, 76, Norwegian politician.
- Mary Bowerman, 97, American botanist.
- Martin Dillon, 48, American musician, operatic tenor and professor of music, heart attack.
- Zbigniew Dłubak, 84, Polish painter, photographer, and art theoretician.
- Polly Hill, 91, British social anthropologist of West Africa, and academic.
- David Ironside, 80, South African cricketer.
- James Jerome, 72, Canadian jurist and politician, former Speaker of the House of Commons.
- Antoine, 13th Prince of Ligne, 80, Belgian noble and son of Eugène, 11th Prince of Ligne.
- Colin McEwan, 64, Australian comedian and actor, cancer.
- Robert Moog, 71, American electronic music inventor and pioneer, brain tumor.
- Lev Naumov, 80, Russian classical pianist, composer and educator.
- Dahlia Ravikovitch, 69, Israeli poet and author.
- Marcus Schmuck, 80, Austrian mountaineer, heart attack.
- Li Wei, 85, Chinese actor.

=== 22 ===
- Luc Ferrari, 76, French musique concrète composer.
- Ginter Gawlik, 74, Polish footballer.
- Henri Génès, 86, French singer and actor.
- Richard Kelly, 81, American politician, former US Representative from Florida (1975–1981), dementia.
- Ernest Kirkendall, 91, American chemist and metallurgist.
- Elizabeth Knight, 60, British actress (Oliver!, McCabe & Mrs. Miller, It's Awfully Bad for Your Eyes, Darling), heart disease.
- Geoffrey Lane, Baron Lane, 87, British judge and former Lord Chief Justice.
- James McMillin, 91, American rower and Olympian (1936).
- Nasser Haji Mokhtar, 74, Iranian footballer.
- Clarence Charles Newcomer, 82, American district judge (United States District Court for the Eastern District of Pennsylvania).
- Juliet Pannett, 94, English portrait painter.
- Tapio Pylkkönen, 82, Finnish footballer and Olympian (1952).
- Mati Unt, 61, Estonian writer and theatre director.

=== 23 ===
- Glenn Corneille, 35, Dutch musician and pianist, car crash.
- William J. Eaton, 74, American Pulitzer Prize–winning journalist and author.
- Aubrey Fielder, 75, British Olympic cross-country skier (1956).
- Brock Peters, 78, American actor (To Kill a Mockingbird, Porgy and Bess, Star Trek: Deep Space Nine), pancreatic cancer.
- Lyndon Woodside, 70, American choral conductor, pneumonia.
- Rémy Zaugg, 62, Swiss painter, primarily.

=== 24 ===
- Jamshed Ansari, 62, Pakistani actor, brain cancer.
- Liu Baiyu, 88, Chinese writer.
- Maurice Cowling, 78, British historian.
- Ambrogio Fogar, 64, Italian adventurer, heart attack.
- Alberto Loret de Mola, 77, Peruvian footballer.
- Kaleth Morales, 21, Colombian vallenato singer and songwriter, traffic collision.
- Tom Pashby, 90, Canadian ophthalmologist and sport safety advocate.
- Jerzy Plebański, 77, Polish theoretical physicist.
- Yuriy Sarantsev, 76, Soviet and Russian actor, cerebrovascular disease.
- Jack Slipper, 81, English Scotland Yard detective.
- Joe Strawder, 64, American basketball player (Bradley Braves, Detroit Pistons).
- Herbert Wright, 57, American television producer, prostate cancer.

=== 25 ===
- Lora Aborn, 98, American composer.
- Ruth Aaronson Bari, 87, American mathematician.
- Walter Becher, 92, German politician.
- Frederick Corfield, 90, British politician.
- Peter Glotz, 66, German politician.
- Georgi Iliev, 39, Bulgarian businessman and president of Lokomotiv Plovdiv, shot.
- Perry Lafferty, 89, American television producer, cancer.
- Terence Morgan, 83, British actor, heart attack.
- Reyhan, 19, Bulgarian singer, car accident.
- Princess Margareta, Princess of Sayn-Wittgenstein-Berleburg, 96, German noblewoman.
- Josiah Tungamirai, 56, Zimbabwean military officer and politician.
- Eleanor Catherine Warren, 86, British cellist and music producer.

=== 26 ===
- Denis D'Amour, 45, Canadian musician, guitarist of Canadian metal band Voivod, cancer.
- Robert Denning, 78, American society interior designer, heart attack.
- Louis Ferron, 63, Dutch novelist and poet.
- Gerry Fitt, 79, Northern Irish politician, elevated to the House of Lords.
- Kostas Manoussakis, 76, Greek film director and screenwriter.
- Rudolf Styskalik, 76, Austrian Olympic water polo player (1952).
- Ed White, 56, Canadian professional wrestler best known as "Moondog King", traffic collision.

=== 27 ===
- Aldo Aniasi, 84, Italian politician.
- Romulo Espaldon, 79, Filipino military officer and diplomat.
- Bob Gibe, 77, American swimmer and Olympian (1948).
- Raimo Lukander, 71, Finnish footballer.
- Seán Purcell, 76, Irish Gaelic footballer.
- Theunis van Schalkwyk, 75, South African boxer and Olympic medalist (1952).

=== 28 ===
- Ali Said Abdella, 55, Eritrean politician, foreign minister of Eritrea, heart attack.
- Roland Annen, 88, Swiss Olympic field hockey player (1936).
- Hans Clarin, 75, German actor, heart failure.
- Antoñita Colomé, 93, Spanish film actress.
- Jacques Dufilho, 91, French comedian.
- Ragnar Graeffe, 75, Finnish sprinter and Olympian (1952).
- Beverly Hatzell, 76, American baseball player.
- Curt Lincoln, 86, Finnish racing driver.
- Maurice R. Severino, 85, American bobsledder and Olympian (1952).
- Esther Szekeres, (née Klein), 95, Hungarian mathematician.
- George Szekeres, 94, Hungarian mathematician.

=== 29 ===
- Ishaya Audu, 79, Nigerian politician.
- Murray Barnson Emeneau, 101, Canadian-American linguist and indologists.
- Jack Luxton, 82, New Zealand politician and dairy farmer.
- Nurcholish Madjid, 66, Indonesian Muslim intellectual.
- James Harry Michael Jr., 86, American district judge (United States District Court for the Western District of Virginia).
- Antonie Plămădeală, 78, Romanian Orthodox metropolitan bishop.
- Margaret Daphne Scott, 71, Australian author and poet, pulmonary emphysema.
- Jude Wanniski, 69, American journalist and economist, heart attack.
- Suh Yong-joo, 71, South Korean long jumper and Olympian (1956, 1960).

=== 30 ===
- Hendrikje van Andel-Schipper, 115, Dutch supercentenarian, oldest recognized person in the world, gastric cancer.
- Fu Biao, 41, Chinese actor, liver cancer.
- Stéphane Bruey, 72, French football player.
- Teófilo Cruz, 63, Puerto Rican basketball player and Olympian (1960, 1964, 1968, 1972, 1976), cerebral hemorrhage.
- Eli Hodkey, 87, American baseball player (Philadelphia Phillies).
- Jakup Mato, 68, Albanian publicist and lector of Tirana University.
- James H. Scheuer, 85, American politician, US Representative from New York (1965–1973 and 1975–1993).
- A. Veerappan, 72, Indian comedian, screenwriter, and film director.

=== 31 ===
- Patrick Tobin Asselin, 75, Canadian politician, member of the House of Commons of Canada (1963-1968).
- Eladia Blázquez, 74, Argentine tango player and composer, cancer.
- Antoni Clavé, 92, Catalan painter, printmaker, sculptor, and costume designer.
- Basudeb Dasgupta, 66, Indian novelist and short-story writer.
- Jaan Kiivit, 65, Estonian Lutheran archbishop.
- John Donaldson, Baron Donaldson of Lymington, 84, British judge, peer, and Master of the Rolls.
- Sam Okoye, 25, Nigerian footballer and Olympian (2000).
- Sir Joseph Rotblat, 96, Polish-British physicist, Nobel laureate, and anti-nuclear weapons campaigner.
- H. W. F. Saggs, 84, English classicist and orientalist.
- Theodore R. Sarbin, 94, American psychologist.
- Michael Sheard, 67, Scottish actor (The Empire Strikes Back), cancer.
- Nina Ulyanenko, 81, Russian aviator.
- Stefania Woytowicz, 82, Polish concert soprano.
