= Wrestling at the 1952 Summer Olympics – Men's Greco-Roman lightweight =

Wrestling at the Olympics

Men's Greco-Roman lightweight at the Games of the XV Olympiad
- Venue: Messuhalli
- Dates: 24–27 July 1952
- Competitors: 19 from 19 nations

Medalists
1st place, gold medalist(s)		Shazam Safin	Soviet Union
2nd place, silver medalist(s)		Gustav Freij	Sweden
3rd place, bronze medalist(s)		Mikuláš Athanasov	Czechoslovakia

The men's Greco-Roman lightweight competition at the 1952 Summer Olympics in Helsinki took place from 24 July to 27 July at Messuhalli. Nations were limited to one competitor. Lightweight was the fourth-lightest category, including wrestlers weighing 62 to 67 kilograms (136.7 to 147.7 lb).

== Competition format ==
This Greco-Roman wrestling competition continued to use the "bad points" elimination system introduced at the 1928 Summer Olympics for Greco-Roman and at the 1932 Summer Olympics for freestyle wrestling, removing the slight modification introduced in 1936 and used until 1948 (which had a reduced penalty for a loss by 2–1 decision). Each round featured all wrestlers pairing off and wrestling one bout (with one wrestler having a bye if there were an odd number). The loser received 3 points. The winner received 1 point if the win was by decision and 0 points if the win was by fall. At the end of each round, any wrestler with at least 5 points was eliminated. This elimination continued until the medal rounds, which began when 3 wrestlers remained. These 3 wrestlers each faced each other in a round-robin medal round (with earlier results counting, if any had wrestled another before); record within the medal round determined medals, with bad points breaking ties.

== Results ==
=== Round 1 ===
Akbulut withdrew after his bout.

Bouts

Winner	Nation	Victory Type	Loser	Nation
Jan Cools	Belgium	Decision, 3–0	Metty Scheitler	Luxembourg
Kamal Hussain	Egypt	Decision, 3–0	Erich Schmidt	Saar
Mikuláš Athanasov	Czechoslovakia	Decision, 3–0	Georgios Petmezas	Greece
André Verdaine	France	Decision, 3–0	Zbigniew Szajewski	Poland
Franco Benedetti	Italy	Fall	Arístides Pérez	Guatemala
Dumitru Cuc	Romania	Fall	Aage Eriksen	Norway
Shazam Safin	Soviet Union	Decision, 3–0	Raif Akbulut	Turkey
Gustav Freij	Sweden	Fall	Jack Rasmussen	Denmark
Kalle Haapasalmi	Finland	Decision, 3–0	Heini Nettesheim	Germany
Gyula Tarr	Hungary	Bye	N/A	N/A

Points

Rank	Wrestler	Nation	Start	Earned	Total
1	Franco Benedetti	Italy	0	0	0
1	Dumitru Cuc	Romania	0	0	0
1	Gustav Freij	Sweden	0	0	0
1	Gyula Tarr	Hungary	0	0	0
5	Mikuláš Athanasov	Czechoslovakia	0	1	1
5	Jan Cools	Belgium	0	1	1
5	Kalle Haapasalmi	Finland	0	1	1
5	Kamal Hussain	Egypt	0	1	1
5	Shazam Safin	Soviet Union	0	1	1
5	André Verdaine	France	0	1	1
11	Aage Eriksen	Norway	0	3	3
11	Heini Nettesheim	Germany	0	3	3
11	Arístides Pérez	Guatemala	0	3	3
11	Georgios Petmezas	Greece	0	3	3
11	Jack Rasmussen	Denmark	0	3	3
11	Metty Scheitler	Luxembourg	0	3	3
11	Erich Schmidt	Saar	0	3	3
11	Zbigniew Szajewski	Poland	0	3	3
19	Raif Akbulut	Turkey	0	3	3*

=== Round 2 ===
Bouts

Winner	Nation	Victory Type	Loser	Nation
Gyula Tarr	Hungary	Decision, 3–0	Jan Cools	Belgium
Kamal Hussain	Egypt	Decision, 3–0	Metty Scheitler	Luxembourg
Erich Schmidt	Saar	Decision, 2–1	Georgios Petmezas	Greece
Mikuláš Athanasov	Czechoslovakia	Decision, 2–1	André Verdaine	France
Zbigniew Szajewski	Poland	Fall	Arístides Pérez	Guatemala
Dumitru Cuc	Romania	Decision, 3–0	Franco Benedetti	Italy
Shazam Safin	Soviet Union	Fall	Aage Eriksen	Norway
Gustav Freij	Sweden	Decision, 3–0	Kalle Haapasalmi	Finland
Jack Rasmussen	Denmark	Fall	Heini Nettesheim	Germany

Points

Rank	Wrestler	Nation	Start	Earned	Total
1	Dumitru Cuc	Romania	0	1	1
1	Gustav Freij	Sweden	0	1	1
1	Shazam Safin	Soviet Union	1	0	1
1	Gyula Tarr	Hungary	0	1	1
5	Mikuláš Athanasov	Czechoslovakia	1	1	2
5	Kamal Hussain	Egypt	1	1	2
7	Franco Benedetti	Italy	0	3	3
7	Jack Rasmussen	Denmark	3	0	3
7	Zbigniew Szajewski	Poland	3	0	3
10	Jan Cools	Belgium	1	3	4
10	Kalle Haapasalmi	Finland	1	3	4
10	Erich Schmidt	Saar	3	1	4
10	André Verdaine	France	1	3	4
14	Aage Eriksen	Norway	3	3	6
14	Heini Nettesheim	Germany	3	3	6
14	Arístides Pérez	Guatemala	3	3	6
14	Georgios Petmezas	Greece	3	3	6
14	Metty Scheitler	Luxembourg	3	3	6

=== Round 3 ===
Bouts

Winner	Nation	Victory Type	Loser	Nation
Gyula Tarr	Hungary	Decision, 3–0	Kamal Hussain	Egypt
Erich Schmidt	Saar	Decision, 3–0	Jan Cools	Belgium
Mikuláš Athanasov	Czechoslovakia	Walkover	Zbigniew Szajewski	Poland
Franco Benedetti	Italy	Decision, 2–1	André Verdaine	France
Gustav Freij	Sweden	Decision, 3–0	Dumitru Cuc	Romania
Shazam Safin	Soviet Union	Fall	Jack Rasmussen	Denmark
Kalle Haapasalmi	Finland	Bye	N/A	N/A

Points

Rank	Wrestler	Nation	Start	Earned	Total
1	Shazam Safin	Soviet Union	1	0	1
2	Mikuláš Athanasov	Czechoslovakia	2	0	2
2	Gustav Freij	Sweden	1	1	2
2	Gyula Tarr	Hungary	1	1	2
5	Franco Benedetti	Italy	3	1	4
5	Dumitru Cuc	Romania	1	3	4
5	Kalle Haapasalmi	Finland	4	0	4
8	Kamal Hussain	Egypt	2	3	5
8	Erich Schmidt	Saar	4	1	5
10	Jack Rasmussen	Denmark	3	3	6
10	Zbigniew Szajewski	Poland	3	3	6
12	Jan Cools	Belgium	4	3	7
12	André Verdaine	France	4	3	7

=== Round 4 ===
Bouts

Winner	Nation	Victory Type	Loser	Nation
Gyula Tarr	Hungary	Decision, 3–0	Kalle Haapasalmi	Finland
Mikuláš Athanasov	Czechoslovakia	Fall	Franco Benedetti	Italy
Shazam Safin	Soviet Union	Decision, 3–0	Dumitru Cuc	Romania
Gustav Freij	Sweden	Bye	N/A	N/A

Points

Rank	Wrestler	Nation	Start	Earned	Total
1	Mikuláš Athanasov	Czechoslovakia	2	0	2
1	Gustav Freij	Sweden	2	0	2
1	Shazam Safin	Soviet Union	1	1	2
4	Gyula Tarr	Hungary	2	1	3
5	Franco Benedetti	Italy	4	3	7
5	Dumitru Cuc	Romania	4	3	7
5	Kalle Haapasalmi	Finland	4	3	7

=== Round 5 ===
Bouts

Winner	Nation	Victory Type	Loser	Nation
Gustav Freij	Sweden	Decision, 3–0	Gyula Tarr	Hungary
Shazam Safin	Soviet Union	Fall	Mikuláš Athanasov	Czechoslovakia

Points

Rank	Wrestler	Nation	Start	Earned	Total
1	Shazam Safin	Soviet Union	2	0	2
2	Gustav Freij	Sweden	2	1	3
3	Mikuláš Athanasov	Czechoslovakia	2	3	5
4	Gyula Tarr	Hungary	3	3	6

=== Medal rounds ===
Safin's victory over Athanasov in round 5 counted for the medal rounds.

Bouts

Winner	Nation	Victory Type	Loser	Nation
Gustav Freij	Sweden	Decision, 3–0	Mikuláš Athanasov	Czechoslovakia
Shazam Safin	Soviet Union	Fall	Gustav Freij	Sweden

Points

Rank	Wrestler	Nation	Wins	Losses	Start	Earned	Total
1st place, gold medalist(s)	Shazam Safin	Soviet Union	2	0	2	0	2
2nd place, silver medalist(s)	Gustav Freij	Sweden	1	1	3	4	7
3rd place, bronze medalist(s)	Mikuláš Athanasov	Czechoslovakia	0	2	5	3	8
