= Deaths in June 2003 =

The following is a list of notable deaths in June 2003.

Entries for each day are listed alphabetically by surname. A typical entry lists information in the following sequence:

- Name, age, country of citizenship at birth, subsequent country of citizenship (if applicable), reason for notability, cause of death (if known), and reference.

== June 2003 ==
=== 1 ===
- Peter Crotty, 77, Irish Olympic boxer (1952).
- Marjorie Finlay, 74, American opera singer and television personality.
- Siegfried Freytag, 83, German Luftwaffe flying ace during World War II.
- Johnny Hopp, 86, American baseball player (St. Louis Cardinals, Boston Braves, Pittsburgh Pirates).
- Jørgen Kiil, 72, Danish actor.
- Johnny Paul Koroma, 43, Sierra Leonean military officer, Head of state (1997-1998).
- Yevgeny Matveyev, 81, Russian actor and film director, lung cancer.
- Johannes Munnikes, 86, Dutch Olympic wrestler (1948).
- Olikoye Ransome-Kuti, 75, Nigerian politician and activist.
- Pete Sivess, 89, American baseball player (Philadelphia Phillies).
- Jakob Šubelj, 80, Slovenian Olympic gymnast (1948).
- María Teresa Valdés, 42, Spanish Olympic archer (1988).
- Eero Virtanen, 87, Finnish Olympic wrestler (1948).
- Burkard Freiherr von Müllenheim-Rechberg, 92, German diplomat and author.
- František Wirth, 88, Czech Olympic gymnast (1948).

=== 2 ===
- Freddie Blassie, 85, American professional wrestler and NWA World Junior Heavyweight Champion, kidney failure.
- Bojčo Brănzov, 57, Bulgarian Olympic basketball player (1968).
- Dick Cusack, 77, American actor (The Fugitive, High Fidelity, Chain Reaction), pancreatic cancer.
- Danka Firfova, 85, Macedonian soprano
- Herb Foster, 89, Canadian ice hockey player (New York Rangers).
- Jean Fournier, 89, French Olympic sports shooter (1948).
- Joel Hitt, 86, American basketball player.
- Donald Jack, 78, Canadian playwright and novelist.
- Makoto Kozuru, 80, Japanese baseball player.
- Burke Marshall, 80, American lawyer and head of the Civil Rights Division.
- Ray Wehba, 86, American football player (Brooklyn Dodgers, Green Bay Packers).

=== 3 ===
- Peter Bromley, 74, British sports broadcaster, BBC Radio's voice of horse racing for 40 years (1961–2001), pancreatic cancer.
- Felix de Weldon, 96, Austrian-American sculptor (Marine Corps War Memorial).
- John Jympson, 72, British film editor (A Fish Called Wanda, A Hard Day's Night, Little Shop of Horrors), diabetes.
- Petre Mshveniyeradze, 74, Soviet and Georgian water polo player and Olympic silver medalist (1952, 1956, 1960).
- Fabrice Salanson, 23, French road cyclist, heart attack.

=== 4 ===
- Muhammad Abdul Bari, 72-73, Bangladeshi academic, linguist and Islamic scholar.
- Joan Leigh Fermor, 91, English photographer.
- Serafín Rojo, 77, Spanish cartoonist and painter.
- Nurul Amin Talukdar, 57, Bangladeshi politician.

=== 5 ===
- Thomas Speakman Barnett, 93, Canadian politician (member of Parliament of Canada for Comox—Alberni, British Columbia).
- John Fairclough, 72, British computer designer, Government Chief Scientific Adviser.
- Patricia Blomfield Holt, 92, Canadian composer, pianist and music educator.
- Jürgen Möllemann, 57, German minister, suicide by jumping.
- Manuel Rosenthal, 98, French composer and conductor.
- Keijo Vanhala, 62, Finnish Olympic modern pentathlete (1964).
- Meir Vilner, 84, Israeli politician and chairman of the Communist Party of Israel.

=== 6 ===
- Frans Van den Berghen, 83, Belgian Olympic canoeist (1948, 1952).
- Adalbert Boros, 94, Romanian Roman Catholic prelate.
- Ken Grimwood, 59, American author, heart attack.
- Michael John, 60, Australian politician.
- Ray Medeiros, 77, American baseball player (Cincinnati Reds).
- Georges Pichard, 83, French comics artist.
- Dave Rowberry, 62, English pianist and organist.
- Shivnath Singh, 56, Indian long-distance runner and Olympian (1976, 1980).
- Hilda Sour, 87, Chilean actress and singer.

=== 7 ===
- Arne Bonde, 78, Norwegian newspaper editor and radio executive.
- Belle Chrystall, 93, British actress.
- R. W. G. Dennis, 92, British botanist.
- Muhammad Abd El-Ghani El-Gamasy, 81, Egyptian Field Marshal and Commander in Chief of The Armed Forces.
- Greg Garrett, 56, American baseball player (California Angels, Cincinnati Reds).
- Trevor Goddard, 40, British actor (JAG, Mortal Kombat, Pirates of the Caribbean: The Curse of the Black Pearl), accidental drug overdose.
- Selahattin Ülkümen, 89, Turkish diplomat.

=== 8 ===
- Thomas S. Gettys, 90, American politician, member of the United States House of Representatives (1964-1974).
- Herschel Burke Gilbert, 85, American orchestrator and composer of film and television scores, complications of a stroke.
- Colin Legum, 84, South African journalist and writer.
- Leighton Rees, 63, Welsh darts player, heart attack.

=== 9 ===
- Geoffrey Ferguson, 65, American lawyer and district judge (United States District Court for the Southern District of Florida).
- Kató Lomb, 94, Hungarian translator and simultaneous interpreter.
- Angelo Palmas, 88, Italian prelate of the Catholic Church.
- Indradeep Sinha, 88, Indian freedom fighter and communist leader.
- German Sveshnikov, 66, Soviet fencer and Olympian (1960, 1964, 1968).

=== 10 ===
- Charles Harrison Brown, 82, American politician (U.S. Representative for Missouri's 7th congressional district).
- John Semple Galbraith, 86, British historian.
- Juan José Gallo, 78, Chilean Olympic basketball player (1948, 1952).
- Hal Gausman, 85, American set decorator.
- Palle Kähler, 63, Danish footballer.
- Zygmunt Ochmański, 80, Polish footballer.
- Silvio Pedroni, 85, Italian racing cyclist and Olympian (1948).
- Livio Dante Porta, 81, Argentine steam locomotive engineer.
- Donald Regan, 84, American politician, Chief of Staff and Treasury Secretary, cancer.
- Carlos Roca, 45, Spanish field hockey player and Olympic medalist (1980, 1984).
- Boy Rozendal, 74, Curaçao politician and journalist.
- David Towell, 66, American politician, member of the United States House of Representatives (1973-1975), cancer.
- Bernard Williams, 73, British moral philosopher, multiple myeloma.
- Phil Williams, 64, Welsh politician, member of the National Assembly for Wales for South Wales East, heart attack.

=== 11 ===
- Cordell Barrow, 63, Trinidadian Olympic sailor (1964).
- David Brinkley, 82, American broadcast journalist (The Huntley–Brinkley Report, NBC Nightly News, This Week with David Brinkley).
- Pankaj Charan Das, 78, Indian classical dancer.
- Ilona Madary, 86, Hungarian gymnast and Olympic medalist (1936).
- William Marshall, 78, American actor, director and opera singer, complications from Alzheimer's disease and diabetes.
- Virgil Mărdărescu, 81, Romanian football manager.
- Matt Mazza, 79, American basketball player (Sheboygan Red Skins).
- Rudolf Tomsits, 57, Hungarian jazz musician.
- Hanna Veres, 74, Ukrainian folk artist, embroiderer and weaver.
- Guy Willatt, 85, English cricketer.

=== 12 ===
- Itamar Assumpção, 53, Brazilian songwriter and composer, colorectal cancer.
- Joseph L. Fleiss, 65, American epidemiologist and professor of biostatistics.
- Marcel Otto-Bruc, 80, French Olympic sports shooter (1960).
- Gregory Peck, 87, American actor (To Kill a Mockingbird, Roman Holiday, The Boys from Brazil), bronchopneumonia.
- Sam Schulman, 93, American sports businessman (Seattle SuperSonics, San Diego Chargers), blood disease.

=== 13 ===
- Harold Ashby, 78, American jazz tenor saxophonist (Duke Ellington Orchestra).
- Robert A. Good, 81, American physician regarded as a founder of modern immunology, esophageal cancer.
- Gene Hayden, 68, American baseball player (Cincinnati Reds).
- Malik Meraj Khalid, 86, Pakistani advocate, left wing politician and Marxist philosopher.
- Guy Lux, 83, French TV host and producer, heart attack.
- Robin Russell, 14th Duke of Bedford, 63, British peer, stroke.
- Tor Stokke, 74, Norwegian film actor, cancer.
- Hassan ibn Yahya, 95, Yemeni royal and statesman.

=== 14 ===
- Valborg Christensen, 86, Danish Olympic swimmer (1936).
- Nikolai Figurovsky, 79, Soviet film director, screenwriter, writer and professor at VGIK.
- Marvin Hammond, 76, Canadian Olympic rower (1948).
- Jimmy Knepper, 75, American jazz trombonist, complications of Parkinson's disease.
- Volker Kriegel, 59, German jazz guitarist and composer.
- Edward F. Moore, 77, American professor of mathematics and computer science, artificial life pioneer.
- Joyce Powell, 81, New Zealand cricketer.
- Günther Schack, 85, German Luftwaffe fighter ace during World War II.
- John Weld, 98, American newspaper reporter and writer (Don't You Cry for Me, Young Man in Paris, September Song).
- Dale Whittington, 43, American race car driver.
- Pete Wysocki, 54, American football player (Washington Redskins).

=== 15 ===
- Ralph Kilner Brown, 93, British jurist and athlete.
- Ed Champagne, 80, American football player (LSU Tigers, Los Angeles Rams).
- Hume Cronyn, 91, Canadian-American actor (The Seventh Cross, Cocoon, The Pelican Brief), Emmy winner (1990, 1992, 1994), prostate cancer.
- Federico Deflorian, 82, Italian cross-country skier and Olympian (1952, 1956, 1960).
- Albert Demuyser, 82, Belgian artist and racehorse owner, cancer.
- Guðmundur Hermannsson, 77, Icelandic Olympic shot putter (1968).
- Kaiser Matanzima, 88, Transkei politician, President (1979-1986).
- Johnny Miles, 97, Canadian marathon runner and Olympian (1928, 1932).
- Alberto Pigaiani, 74, Italian heavyweight weightlifter and Olympic medalist (1956, 1960).
- Philip Stone, 79, British actor (The Shining, Indiana Jones and the Temple of Doom, A Clockwork Orange).
- René Touzet, 86, Cuban composer, pianist and bandleader.
- Bill Wentworth, 95, Australian politician (member of Australian Parliament for Mackellar).
- James Willis, 79, Australian admiral and Chief of Naval Staff.

=== 16 ===
- Asa Baber, 66, American writer and magazine columnist for Playboy, ALS.
- Enrico Baj, 78, Italian artist and writer on art.
- Les Benjamin, 78, Canadian politician (MP for Regina—Lake Centre, Regina West, Regina—Lumsden, Saskatchewan).
- Miguel Bordón, 50, Argentine footballer.
- Pierre Bourgault, 69, Canadian politician, essayist, actor and journalist, lung cancer.
- George Maughan, 93, Canadian Olympic boxer (1932).
- Peter Redgrove, 71, British poet.
- Carlos Rivas, 78, American actor, prostate cancer.
- Georg Henrik von Wright, 87, Finnish philosopher, professor and writer.
- René Walschot, 87, Belgian racing cyclist.
- Josef Zeman, 77, Czech Olympic wrestler (1952).

=== 17 ===
- Gaston Audier, 90, French cyclist.
- Frank M. Clark, 87, American politician (U.S. Representative for Pennsylvania's 25th congressional district).
- Wilhelm Deist, 71, German historian and author.
- Kuda Ditta, 66, Malaysian athlete and Olympian (1964).
- Elsa Grave, 85, Swedish novelist, poet and artist.
- Paul Hirst, 57, British sociologist and political theorist.
- Frank Mulville, 87, Australian rugby league footballer.
- Marcella Pobbe, 81, Italian operatic soprano.
- Jean-Jacques Vierne, 82, French film director.

=== 18 ===
- Guy Bara, 79, Belgian comic strip writer and artist (Max l'explorateur).
- Kenneth Cross, 91, British Royal Air Force commander.
- Paul Daisley, 45, British politician, colorectal cancer.
- Larry Doby, 79, American baseball player (Cleveland Indians, Chicago White Sox, Detroit Tigers), and member of the MLB Hall of Fame, bone cancer.
- Jankidas, 93, Indian actor of Hindi cinema, cyclist, production designer, and writer.
- Ernest Martin, 42, American murderer, execution by lethal injection.

=== 19 ===
- Jack Butterworth, Baron Butterworth, 85, British lawyer, academic and life peer (House of Lords 1985–2003).
- Mel Ferber, 80, American television director and producer, heart attack.
- Peanuts Hucko, 85, American big band musician.
- Rafael Ileto, 82, Filipino army general and politician, heart attack.
- Ethan James, 57, American musician, record producer, and recording engineer, liver cancer.
- Vladimír Karas, 76, Czech Olympic gymnast (1948).
- Mahfoud Nahnah, 61, Algerian politician, leukemia.
- Lev Rvalov, 62, Soviet Russian Olympic sailor (1968).
- Laura Sadler, 22, British television actress, accidental fall.
- Belding Hibbard Scribner, 82, American physician and pioneering kidney dialysis researcher.

=== 20 ===
- LaMar Baker, 87, American politician (U.S. Representative for Tennessee's 3rd congressional district).
- I. Bernard Cohen, 89, American professor of the history of science and author.
- Fielder Cook, 80, American television and film director, producer, and writer, complications from a stroke.
- André Grillon, 81, French football player and football manager.
- Moshe Kupferman, 76, Israeli artist.
- Sándor Lenkei, 66, Hungarian footballer.
- Terry Milligan, 73, Irish boxer and Olympian (1952).
- Raymond Serra, 66, American actor (Teenage Mutant Ninja Turtles, Prizzi's Honor, The Edge of Night).
- Bob Stump, 76, American politician (U.S. Representative for Arizona's 3rd congressional district), myelodysplasia.
- Vic Vasicek, 77, American football player (Buffalo Bills, Los Angeles Rams).

=== 21 ===
- George Axelrod, 81, American screenwriter (Bus Stop, Breakfast at Tiffany's, The Manchurian Candidate).
- Piet Dankert, 69, Dutch politician, State Secretary for Foreign Affairs and President of the European Parliament.
- Charles Dédéyan, 93, French literary historian.
- Anita Felguth, 94, German champion table tennis player.
- Jules Marchal, 78, Belgian diplomat and historian.
- Hiroko Matsumoto, 66, Japanese fashion model.
- Jason Moran, 35, Australian criminal, murdered.
- Roger Neilson, 69, Canadian ice hockey coach, skin cancer.
- Leon Uris, 78, American author, kidney failure.
- Magnus von Braun, 84, German chemical engineer, rocket scientist and business executive.
- Sergei Vronsky, 67, Soviet cinematographer .
- Alvise Zichichi, 64, Italian chess master.

=== 22 ===
- Sergio Bruni, 81, Popular Italian singer, guitarist, and songwriter.
- Vasil Bykaŭ, 79, Belarusian writer.
- Joseph Chaikin, 67, American theatre director, actor, and playwright.
- Tom Finnin, 75, American football player (Baltimore Colts, Chicago Cardinals, Green Bay Packers).
- Gladys Heldman, 81, American tennis player, manager and magazine publisher, suicide by gunshot.
- Harry Kinzy, 92, American baseball player (Chicago White Sox).
- Leonard Koppett, 79, Soviet-American sportswriter and author, heart attack.
- John Mandic, 83, American basketball player.
- Shelby Starner, 19, American singer-songwriter and musician, complications from bulimia nervosa.

=== 23 ===
- Chuck Carroll, 96, American college football player and attorney.
- Sven Fahlman, 88, Swedish fencer and Olympian (1952).
- Maynard Jackson, 65, American politician and the first Afro American mayor of Atlanta, Georgia, heart attack.
- Max Manning, 84, American baseball player.
- Doug Ring, 84, Australian cricketer.
- Fred Sandback, 59, American minimalist sculptor, suicide.
- Aleksandr Sidelnikov, 52, Soviet ice hockey player and Olympian (1976), heart failure.
- Bob Smith, 75, American baseball player (Boston Red Sox, Chicago Cubs, Cleveland Indians).

=== 24 ===
- Jack Bruner, 78, American baseball player (Chicago White Sox, St. Louis Browns).
- Dorothy Dodson, 84, American athlete and Olympian (1948).
- Alex Gordon, 80, British film producer and screenwriter.
- Wataru Kubo, 74, Japanese politician.
- José Trías Monge, 83, Puerto Rican lawyer and judge.
- Akira Nagoya, 72, Japanese actor and seiyū.
- Fred Small, 39, American football player (Pittsburgh Steelers).
- Barbara Weeks, 89, American actress (Ziegfeld Follies, Now I'll Tell).

=== 25 ===
- Rene Cayetano, 68, Filipino television presenter, journalist and politician, abdominal cancer.
- Johnny Dauwe, 37, Belgian Olympic cyclist (1988), suicide.
- Archibald D. Johnston, 63, Canadian politician.
- Lester Maddox, 87, American politician and segregationist , Governor of Georgia (1967-1971), complications from pneumonia and prostate cancer.
- Theodore Cressy Skeat, 96, British academic and librarian at the British Museum.
- André Théard, 97, Haitian Olympic sprinter (1924, 1928, 1932).
- Lew Watts, 81, American baseball player.
- Shun Yashiro, 70, Japanese actor and voice actor, stroke.
- Emanuel Zervakis, 73, American racing driver.

=== 26 ===
- John G. Adams, 91, American lawyer, counsel in the Army–McCarthy hearings.
- Marc-Vivien Foé, 28, Cameroonian footballer, heart attack.
- Masoud Ghadimi, 38, Iranian Olympic wrestler (1988).
- Daniel G. Hill, 79, American-Canadian sociologist, civil servant, and human rights specialist.
- Isaac Schapera, 98, British social anthropologist.
- Sir Denis Thatcher, 88, British businessman, Spouse of the Prime Minister (1979–1990), pancreatic cancer.
- Strom Thurmond, 100, American politician, Governor of South Carolina, and the only centenarian to serve in the U.S. Congress, heart failure.

=== 27 ===
- Gerald Balfour, 4th Earl of Balfour, 77, British hereditary peer (House of Lords 1968–1999), businessman and politician.
- Prince Carl Bernadotte, 92, Swedish prince.
- Floyd Fithian, 74, American educator and politician.
- Walter Hugo Khouri, 73, Brazilian film director, screenwriter, and producer.
- Gary Lane, 60, American gridiron football player (Cleveland Browns, New York Giants), heart attack.
- Eero Lehtovirta, 76, Finnish Olympic rower (1952).
- David Newman, 66, American screenwriter (Bonnie and Clyde, There Was a Crooked Man..., What's Up, Doc?), stroke.
- Giuseppe Pontiggia, 68, Italian writer and literary critic, stroke.
- Anthony Poshepny, 78, American CIA Paramilitary Operations Officer and model for Colonel Kurtz in the movie Apocalypse Now.
- Luther H. Richmond, 87, American air force general, cancer.
- Ken Smith, 64, British poet.
- John Heydon Stokes, 85, British politician (Member of Parliament for Oldbury and Halesowen, Halesowen and Stourbridge).

=== 28 ===
- George Baxt, 80, American screenwriter and author (Circus of Horrors, The City of the Dead), complication from heart surgery.
- Kevin Belcher, 42, American football player (UTEP Miners, New York Giants).
- Clem Christesen, 91, Australian literary critic and editor.
- Russell Endean, 79, South African cricket player.
- Pauline Flanagan, 77, Irish-American actress, heart attack, lung cancer.
- Robert Muir Graves, 72, American golf course architect, cancer.
- Rio Kishida, 57, Japanese playwright and director.
- Joan Lowery Nixon, 76, American journalist and author, pancreatic cancer.
- George E. Shipley, 76, American politician, member of the United States House of Representatives (1959-1979).
- Willem Slijkhuis, 80, Dutch athlete and Olympian (1948, 1952).

=== 29 ===
- Rod Amateau, 79, American screenwriter and director (The Many Loves of Dobie Gillis, The George Burns and Gracie Allen Show), cerebral hemorrhage.
- Semion Braude, 92, Soviet and Ukrainian physicist and radio astronomer.
- Katharine Hepburn, 96, American actress (The African Queen, The Lion in Winter, On Golden Pond), four-time Oscar winner, heart attack.
- Mordechai Hod, 76, Israeli Air Force general.
- James Kelly, 89, American abstract expressionist artist.
- Norman O'Connor, 81, American priest and jazz musician.

=== 30 ===
- Noor Alam, 73, Pakistani field hockey player and Olympian (1956, 1960).
- Barbara Galdonik, 68, American baseball player.
- Buddy Hackett, 78, American comedian and actor (It's a Mad, Mad, Mad, Mad World, The Little Mermaid, The Love Bug), diabetes.
- Joe Marhefka, 101, American football player (Pottsville Maroons).
- Robert McCloskey, 88, American children's book writer and illustrator.
- Joseph Overton, 43, American political scientist, namesake of the Overton window, plane crash.
- Constance Smith, 74, Irish actress.
