= Shimotori =

Shimotori is a Japanese surname. Its meaning depends on the kanji used to write it; various ways of writing it include 下鳥, 霜鳥, and others. People with this surname include:

- Takeo Shimotori (霜鳥 武雄, born 1928), Japanese freestyle wrestler
- Shimotori Norio (霜鳥 典雄, born 1978), Japanese sumo wrestler
