= Shazam Safin =

Soviet wrestler (1932–1985)

Medal record

Men's Greco-Roman wrestling

Representing Soviet Union

Olympic Games
Gold medal – first place	1952 Helsinki	Lightweight

World Championships
Bronze medal – third place	1953 Naples	67 kg

Shazam Sergeyevich Safin (Russian: Шазам Серге́евич Сафин, Tatar: Шәзам Сафа улы Сафин; born 17 April 1932 – 1985) was a Soviet wrestler of Tatar heritage who competed in the 1952 Summer Olympics. He was born in Kochki-Pozharki, Nizhny Novgorod.

At the USSR championship-1952 Shazam Safin took the third place. According to the classification of that period, this result was not high enough for the title of master of sports to be conferred upon the athlete. To receive the "master of sports" title, the athlete was either to win the USSR national championship or to take second place. However, Safin, a first-grade wrestler, got included into the USSR Olympic team and successfully appeared at the XV Olympic Games winning the gold medal. In final fight he won famous Swedish wrestler Gustav Freij. In the 1953 World Championship in Naples (Italy), Safin received the bronze medal, having lost points to Finnish athlete Lehton. The world champion title in the 67 kg weight class was gained by Frei.
