= Wrestling at the 1948 Summer Olympics – Men's Greco-Roman lightweight =

Wrestling at the Olympics

Men's Greco-Roman lightweight at the Games of the XIV Olympiad
- Venue: Empress Hall, Earls Court Exhibition Centre
- Dates: 3–6 August 1948
- Competitors: 17 from 17 nations

Medalists
1st place, gold medalist(s)		Gustav Freij	Sweden
2nd place, silver medalist(s)		Aage Eriksen	Norway
3rd place, bronze medalist(s)		Károly Ferencz	Hungary

The men's Greco-Roman lightweight competition at the 1948 Summer Olympics in London took place from 3 August to 6 August at the Empress Hall, Earls Court Exhibition Centre. Nations were limited to one competitor. Lightweight was the fourth-lightest category, including wrestlers weighing 62 to 67 kilograms (136.7 to 147.7 lb).

This Greco-Roman wrestling competition continued to use the "bad points" elimination system introduced at the 1928 Summer Olympics for Greco-Roman and at the 1932 Summer Olympics for freestyle wrestling, with the slight modification introduced in 1936. Each round featured all wrestlers pairing off and wrestling one bout (with one wrestler having a bye if there were an odd number). The loser received 3 points if the loss was by fall or unanimous decision and 2 points if the decision was 2-1 (this was the modification from prior years, where all losses were 3 points). The winner received 1 point if the win was by decision and 0 points if the win was by fall. At the end of each round, any wrestler with at least 5 points was eliminated.

== Results ==
=== Round 1 ===
Jauch withdrew during his match. Tuhý withdrew after his victory.

Bouts

Winner	Nation	Victory Type	Loser	Nation
Giacomo Gesino	Italy	Decision, 3–0	Frans Rombaut	Belgium
Károly Ferencz	Hungary	Decision, 3–0	Aage Eriksen	Norway
Georgios Petmezas	Greece	Decision, 3–0	Mohamed Ahmed Osman	Egypt
Charif Damage	Lebanon	Fall	Luis Rosado	Argentina
Abraham Kurland	Denmark	Retired	Alfred Jauch	Switzerland
Ahmet Şenol	Turkey	Decision, 2–1	Albert Falaux	France
Gustav Freij	Sweden	Fall	Ray Myland	Great Britain
Václav Tuhý	Czechoslovakia	Decision, 3–0	Eero Virtanen	Finland
Johannes Munnikes	Netherlands	Bye	N/A	N/A

Points

Rank	Wrestler	Nation	Start	Earned	Total
1	Charif Damage	Lebanon	0	0	0
1	Gustav Freij	Sweden	0	0	0
1	Abraham Kurland	Denmark	0	0	0
1	Johannes Munnikes	Netherlands	0	0	0
5	Károly Ferencz	Hungary	0	1	1
5	Giacomo Gesino	Italy	0	1	1
5	Georgios Petmezas	Greece	0	1	1
5	Ahmet Şenol	Turkey	0	1	1
9	Albert Falaux	France	0	2	2
10	Aage Eriksen	Norway	0	3	3
10	Ray Myland	Great Britain	0	3	3
10	Mohamed Ahmed Osman	Egypt	0	3	3
10	Frans Rombaut	Belgium	0	3	3
10	Luis Rosado	Argentina	0	3	3
10	Eero Virtanen	Finland	0	3	3
16	Václav Tuhý	Czechoslovakia	0	1	1*
17	Alfred Jauch	Switzerland	0	3	3*

=== Round 2 ===
Bouts

Winner	Nation	Victory Type	Loser	Nation
Johannes Munnikes	Netherlands	Fall	Frans Rombaut	Belgium
Aage Eriksen	Norway	Decision, 2–1	Giacomo Gesino	Italy
Károly Ferencz	Hungary	Decision, 2–1	Mohamed Ahmed Osman	Egypt
Georgios Petmezas	Greece	Fall	Luis Rosado	Argentina
Charif Damage	Lebanon	Decision, 3–0	Abraham Kurland	Denmark
Gustav Freij	Sweden	Fall	Albert Falaux	France
Ahmet Şenol	Turkey	Fall	Ray Myland	Great Britain
Eero Virtanen	Finland	Bye	N/A	N/A

Points

Rank	Wrestler	Nation	Start	Earned	Total
1	Gustav Freij	Sweden	0	0	0
1	Johannes Munnikes	Netherlands	0	0	0
3	Charif Damage	Lebanon	0	1	1
3	Georgios Petmezas	Greece	1	0	1
3	Ahmet Şenol	Turkey	1	0	1
6	Károly Ferencz	Hungary	1	1	2
7	Giacomo Gesino	Italy	1	2	3
7	Abraham Kurland	Denmark	0	3	3
7	Eero Virtanen	Finland	3	0	3
10	Aage Eriksen	Norway	3	1	4
11	Albert Falaux	France	2	3	5
11	Mohamed Ahmed Osman	Egypt	3	2	5
13	Ray Myland	Great Britain	3	3	6
13	Frans Rombaut	Belgium	3	3	6
13	Luis Rosado	Argentina	3	3	6

=== Round 3 ===
Bouts

Winner	Nation	Victory Type	Loser	Nation
Eero Virtanen	Finland	Decision, 3–0	Johannes Munnikes	Netherlands
Károly Ferencz	Hungary	Decision, 2–1	Giacomo Gesino	Italy
Aage Eriksen	Norway	Declared	Georgios Petmezas	Greece
Charif Damage	Lebanon	Decision, 3–0	Ahmet Şenol	Turkey
Gustav Freij	Sweden	Decision, 2–1	Abraham Kurland	Denmark

Points

Rank	Wrestler	Nation	Start	Earned	Total
1	Gustav Freij	Sweden	0	1	1
2	Charif Damage	Lebanon	1	1	2
3	Károly Ferencz	Hungary	2	1	3
3	Johannes Munnikes	Netherlands	0	3	3
5	Aage Eriksen	Norway	4	0	4
5	Georgios Petmezas	Greece	1	3	4
5	Ahmet Şenol	Turkey	1	3	4
5	Eero Virtanen	Finland	3	1	4
9	Giacomo Gesino	Italy	3	2	5
9	Abraham Kurland	Denmark	3	2	5

=== Round 4 ===
Bouts

Winner	Nation	Victory Type	Loser	Nation
Aage Eriksen	Norway	Retired	Eero Virtanen	Finland
Károly Ferencz	Hungary	Fall	Johannes Munnikes	Netherlands
Charif Damage	Lebanon	Decision, 3–0	Georgios Petmezas	Greece
Gustav Freij	Sweden	Fall	Ahmet Şenol	Turkey

Points

Rank	Wrestler	Nation	Start	Earned	Total
1	Gustav Freij	Sweden	1	0	1
2	Charif Damage	Lebanon	2	1	3
2	Károly Ferencz	Hungary	3	0	3
4	Aage Eriksen	Norway	4	0	4
5	Johannes Munnikes	Netherlands	3	3	6
6	Georgios Petmezas	Greece	4	3	7
6	Ahmet Şenol	Turkey	4	3	7
6	Eero Virtanen	Finland	4	3	7

=== Round 5 ===
Eriksen was eliminated despite winning, as the victory by decision gave him his fifth point. Freij was the only remaining wrestler with fewer than five, winning gold. Eriksen took silver. Ferencz and Damage each had six points, and had not previously faced each other, so a bronze medal match was staged.

Bouts

Winner	Nation	Victory Type	Loser	Nation
Gustav Freij	Sweden	Decision, 3–0	Károly Ferencz	Hungary
Aage Eriksen	Norway	Decision, 3–0	Charif Damage	Lebanon

Points

Rank	Wrestler	Nation	Start	Earned	Total
1st place, gold medalist(s)	Gustav Freij	Sweden	1	1	2
2nd place, silver medalist(s)	Aage Eriksen	Norway	4	1	5
3	Charif Damage	Lebanon	3	3	6
3	Károly Ferencz	Hungary	3	3	6

=== Bronze medal match ===
Ferencz took the bronze medal in a split decision.

Bouts

Winner	Nation	Victory Type	Loser	Nation
Károly Ferencz	Hungary	Decision, 2–1	Charif Damage	Lebanon

Points

Rank	Wrestler	Nation	Start	Earned	Total
3rd place, bronze medalist(s)	Károly Ferencz	Hungary	6	1	7
4	Charif Damage	Lebanon	6	2	8
