= Kamal Hossain (disambiguation) =

Kamal Hossain (born 1937) is a Bangladeshi lawyer and politician.

Kamal Hossain may also refer to:

- Kamal Hussain (wrestler) (born 1932), an Egyptian wrestler
- Kamal Hossain (kabaddi) (born 1978), Bangladeshi kabaddi player
