= Scheitler =

Scheitler is a German language surname. Notable people with the name include:

- Metty Scheitler (1915–1972), Luxembourgian wrestler
- Nic Scheitler (1910–1999), Luxembourgian weightlifter
