= Gyula Tarr =

Hungarian wrestler

Personal information
- Nationality: Hungarian
- Born: 3 May 1931 Budapest, Hungary
- Died: 24 January 2012 (aged 80) Budapest, Hungary

Sport
- Sport: Wrestling

Gyula Tarr (5 May 1931 – 24 January 2012) was a Hungarian wrestler. He competed in the men's Greco-Roman lightweight at the 1952 Summer Olympics.
