= Kalle Haapasalmi =

Finnish wrestler

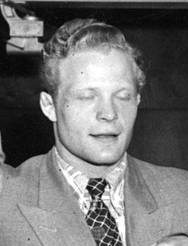
- Kalle Haapasalmi

Personal information
- Nationality: Finnish
- Born: 3 November 1926 Ilmajoki, Finland
- Died: 2 May 2006 (aged 79)

Sport
- Sport: Wrestling

Kalle Haapasalmi (3 November 1926 – 2 May 2006) was a Finnish wrestler. He competed in the men's Greco-Roman lightweight at the 1952 Summer Olympics.
