= Václav Tuhý =

Czech wrestler

Personal information
- Nationality: Czech
- Born: 7 July 1924 Prague, Czechoslovakia

Sport
- Sport: Wrestling

Václav Tuhý (born 7 July 1924) was a Czech wrestler. He competed in the men's Greco-Roman lightweight at the 1948 Summer Olympics.
