= Osvaldo Blasi =

Argentine wrestler (1928–2012)

Personal information
- Nationality: Argentine
- Born: 5 February 1928
- Died: 8 July 2012 (aged 84)

Sport
- Sport: Wrestling

Osvaldo Blasi (5 February 1928 – 8 July 2012) was an Argentine wrestler. He competed in the men's freestyle lightweight at the 1952 Summer Olympics.
