= Dumitru Cuc =

Romanian wrestler (1928–2019)

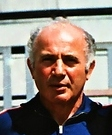

Personal information
- Nationality: Romanian
- Born: 24 March 1928 Calea Mare, Romania
- Died: 24 November 2019 (aged 91)

Sport
- Sport: Wrestling

Dumitru Cuc (24 March 1928 – 24 November 2019) was a Romanian wrestler. He competed in the men's Greco-Roman lightweight at the 1952 Summer Olympics.
