= Blondie Pienaar =

South African wrestler (1926–2004)

Personal information
- Full name: Godfrey Anathore Pienaar
- Nationality: South African
- Born: 12 May 1926
- Died: 14 June 2004 (aged 78) Auckland, New Zealand

Sport
- Sport: Wrestling

Godfrey Anathore "Blondie" Pienaar (12 May 1926 –14 June 2004) was a South African wrestler. He competed in the men's freestyle lightweight at the 1952 Summer Olympics.
