= Giacomo Gesino =

Italian wrestler

Personal information
- Nationality: Italian
- Born: 27 January 1918 Genoa, Italy
- Died: 18 February 2003 (aged 85)

Sport
- Sport: Wrestling

Giacomo Gesino (27 January 1918 – 18 February 2003) was an Italian wrestler. He competed in the men's Greco-Roman lightweight at the 1948 Summer Olympics.
