= József Gál =

Hungarian wrestler

Personal information
- Nationality: Hungarian
- Born: 20 April 1918 Cegléd, Hungary
- Died: 2 February 2003 (aged 84) Cegléd, Hungary

Sport
- Sport: Wrestling

József Gál (20 April 1918 – 2 February 2003) was a Hungarian wrestler. He competed in the men's freestyle lightweight at the 1952 Summer Olympics.
