= Alfred Jauch =

Swiss wrestler

Personal information
- Nationality: Swiss

Sport
- Sport: Wrestling

Alfred Jauch was a Swiss wrestler. He competed in the men's Greco-Roman lightweight at the 1948 Summer Olympics.
