= 1953 World Wrestling Championships =

- Host city: Naples, Italy
- Dates: 17–19 April 1953

Champions
- Greco-Roman: Soviet Union

The 1953 World Greco-Roman Wrestling Championship were held in Naples, Italy from 17 to 19 April 1953.

== Medal table ==
Rank	Nation	Gold	Silver	Bronze	Total
1	Soviet Union	5	1	1	7
2	Sweden	3	1	0	4
3	Finland	0	2	1	3
4	Hungary	0	2	0	2
5	Italy	0	1	3	4
6	Turkey	0	1	0	1
7	Belgium	0	0	1	1
7	Lebanon	0	0	1	1
7	Switzerland	0	0	1	1
Totals (9 entries)		8	8	8	24

== Team ranking ==
Rank	Men's Greco-Roman	
Rank	Team	Points
1	Soviet Union	41
2	Sweden	24.5
3	Finland	20
4	Italy	17
5	Hungary	15
6	Turkey	14.5

== Medal summary ==
Event	Gold	Silver	Bronze
Flyweight; 52 kg	Boris Gurevich; Soviet Union	Ahmet Bilek; Turkey	Maurice Mewis; Belgium
Bantamweight; 57 kg	Artem Teryan; Soviet Union	Imre Hódos; Hungary	Giovanni Cocco; Italy
Featherweight; 62 kg	Olle Anderberg; Sweden	Umberto Trippa; Italy	Elie Naasan; Lebanon
Lightweight; 67 kg	Gustav Freij; Sweden	Kyösti Lehtonen; Finland	Shazam Safin; Soviet Union
Welterweight; 73 kg	Gurgen Shatvoryan; Soviet Union	Miklós Szilvási; Hungary	Franco Benedetti; Italy
Middleweight; 79 kg	Givi Kartozia; Soviet Union	Axel Grönberg; Sweden	Kalervo Rauhala; Finland
Light heavyweight 87 kg	August Englas; Soviet Union	Kelpo Gröndahl; Finland	Kurt Rusterholz; Switzerland
Heavyweight +87 kg	Bertil Antonsson; Sweden	Johannes Kotkas; Soviet Union	Guido Fantoni; Italy
