= Károly Ferencz =

Hungarian wrestler (1913–1984)

Personal information
- Nationality: Hungarian
- Born: 14 October 1911 Budapest
- Died: 21 June 1984 (aged 70)

Sport
- Sport: Wrestling
Medal record
Men's Greco-Roman wrestling
Representing Hungary
Olympic Games
Bronze medal – third place	1948 London	Lightweight

Károly Ferencz (14 October 1911 – 21 June 1984) was a Hungarian sport wrestler. He was born in Budapest. He won a bronze medal in Greco-Roman wrestling, lightweight class, at the 1948 Summer Olympics in London.
