= Paul Besson =

Swiss wrestler (1926–1988)

Personal information
- Full name: Paul Aloïs Besson
- Nationality: Swiss
- Born: 25 March 1926 Vevey, Switzerland
- Died: 25 August 1988 (aged 62) Ollon, Switzerland

Sport
- Sport: Wrestling

Paul Aloïs Besson (25 March 1926 – 25 August 1988) was a Swiss wrestler. He competed in the men's freestyle lightweight at the 1952 Summer Olympics. Besson died on Ollon on 25 August 1988, at the age of 62.
