= Raif Akbulut =

Turkish wrestler (born 1929)

Personal information
- Nationality: Turkish
- Born: 1929

Sport
- Sport: Wrestling

Raif Akbulut (born 1929) is a Turkish retired wrestler. He competed in the men's Greco-Roman lightweight at the 1952 Summer Olympics.
