= Erik Østrand =

Danish wrestler (1918–1989)

Personal information
- Nationality: Danish
- Born: 12 May 1918 Copenhagen, Denmark
- Died: 8 June 1989 (aged 71) Copenhagen, Denmark

Sport
- Sport: Wrestling

Erik Østrand (12 May 1918 – 8 June 1989) was a Danish wrestler. He competed in the men's freestyle lightweight at the 1952 Summer Olympics.
