= Mohamed Badr =

Egyptian wrestler

Abdel Aziz Badr
Personal information
- Full name: Mohamed Abdel Aziz Badr
- Nationality: Egyptian
- Born: 13 October 1929

Sport
- Sport: Wrestling

Abdel Aziz Badr (born 13 October 1929) is an Egyptian wrestler. He competed in the men's freestyle lightweight at the 1952 Summer Olympics.
