= Charif Damage =

Lebanese wrestler (1921–2001)

Personal information
- Nationality: Lebanese
- Born: 1921
- Died: April 2001 (aged 79–80)

Sport
- Sport: Wrestling

Charif Damage (1921 – April 2001) was a Lebanese wrestler. He competed in the men's Greco-Roman lightweight at the 1948 Summer Olympics. Damage died in April 2001.
