= Jack Vard =

Irish wrestler

Personal information
- Nationality: Irish
- Born: 29 May 1926 Dublin, Ireland
- Died: 13 April 1998 (aged 71)

Sport
- Sport: Amateur wrestling

Jack Vard (29 May 1926 – 13 April 1998) was an Irish wrestler. He competed in the men's freestyle lightweight at the 1952 Summer Olympics.

Vard was a two-times winner of the British Wrestling Championships in 1949 and 1951.
