= Luis Rosado (wrestler) =

Argentine wrestler

Personal information
- Nationality: Argentine
- Born: 26 August 1921
- Died: 6 June 2007 (aged 85)

Sport
- Sport: Wrestling

Luis Rosado (26 August 1921 – 6 June 2007) was an Argentine wrestler. He competed in the men's Greco-Roman lightweight at the 1948 Summer Olympics.
