= Albert Falaux =

French wrestler

Personal information
- Nationality: French
- Born: 10 April 1921 Paris, France
- Died: 30 May 2013 (aged 92) Le Kremlin, France

Sport
- Sport: Wrestling

Albert Falaux (10 April 1921 – 30 May 2013) was a French wrestler. He competed in the men's Greco-Roman lightweight at the 1948 Summer Olympics.
