= Tofigh Jahanbakht =

Iranian wrestler (1931–1970)

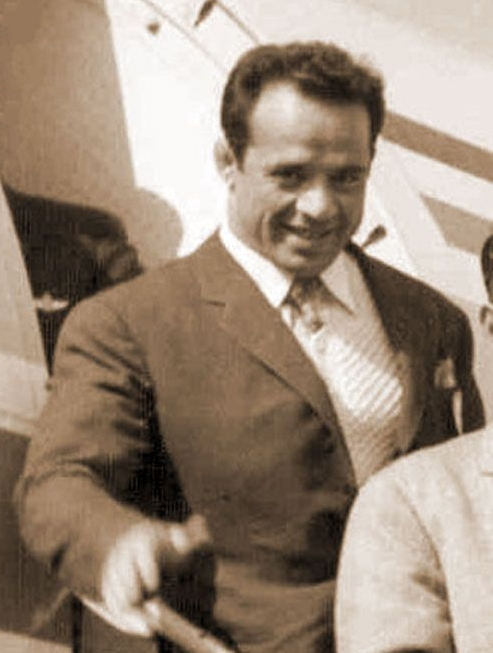

Personal information
- Born: 9 February 1931 Sarab, East Azerbaijan, Iran
- Died: 28 April 1970 (aged 39) London, England

Sport
- Sport: Freestyle wrestling
Medal record
Men's freestyle wrestling
Representing Iran
Olympic Games
Bronze medal – third place	1952 Helsinki	67 kg
World Championships
Gold medal – first place	1954 Tokyo	67 kg
World Cup
Silver medal – second place	1958 Sofia	73 kg
Asian Games
Silver medal – second place	1958 Tokyo	73 kg

Tofigh Jahanbakht (South Azerbaijani: جهانبخت توفیق, Azerbaijani: Cahanbəxt Tofiq) (February 9, 1931 – April 28, 1970) was an Iranian freestyle wrestler. He won a gold medal at the 1954 World Wrestling Championships, which was Iran's first gold medal at the World Wrestling Championships, and also a bronze medal at the 1952 Olympics.

In 1961, he won the middleweight title at the British Wrestling Championships. He participated in the championships because he was studying engineering in England at the time.

Tofigh had a hereditary liver illness, which resulted in the death of his mother and brother. He died of the same illness in London, aged 39.
