= Frans Rombaut =

Belgian wrestler (1921–2006)

Frans Ferdinand Rombaut
Personal information
- Nationality: Belgian
- Born: 25 November 1921 Temse, Belgium
- Died: 25 October 2006 (aged 84) Verviers, Belgium

Sport
- Sport: Wrestling

Frans Rombaut (25 November 1921 – 25 October 2006) was a Belgian wrestler. He competed in the men's Greco-Roman lightweight at the 1948 Summer Olympics.
