= Risto Talosela =

Finnish wrestler

Personal information
- Nationality: Finnish
- Born: 21 November 1924 Lapua, Finland
- Died: 26 October 2018 (aged 93)

Sport
- Sport: Wrestling

Risto Talosela (21 November 1924 – 26 October 2018) was a Finnish wrestler. He competed in the men's freestyle lightweight at the 1952 Summer Olympics.
