= Tevfik Yüce =

Turkish wrestler

Personal information
- Nationality: Turkish
- Born: 1927
- Died: 4 January 2005 (aged 77–78) Bursa, Turkey

Sport
- Sport: Wrestling

Tevfik Yüce (1927 – 4 January 2005) was a Turkish wrestler. He competed in the men's freestyle lightweight at the 1952 Summer Olympics.
