= Mikuláš Athanasov =

Czechoslovak wrestler (1930–2005)

Medal record

Representing Czechoslovakia

Men's Greco-Roman wrestling

Olympic Games
Bronze medal – third place	1952 Helsinki	Lightweight

Mikuláš Athanasov (28 November 1930 – 26 December 2005) was a Czechoslovak wrestler. He was born in Košice. He won an Olympic bronze medal in Greco-Roman wrestling at the 1952 Summer Olympics in Helsinki.
