= Erich Schmidt (wrestler) =

German wrestler

Personal information
- Nationality: German
- Born: 27 February 1925 Völklingen, Germany
- Died: 24 September 2009 (aged 84) Völklingen, Germany

Sport
- Sport: Wrestling

Erich Schmidt (27 February 1925 – 24 September 2009) was a German wrestler. He competed in the men's Greco-Roman lightweight at the 1952 Summer Olympics, representing Saar.
