= Jack Rasmussen =

Danish wrestler (1923–2003)

Personal information
- Full name: Jack Finn Rasmussen
- Nationality: Danish
- Born: 9 February 1923 Frederiksberg, Denmark
- Died: 25 January 2003 (aged 79)

Sport
- Sport: Wrestling

Jack Finn Rasmussen (9 February 1923 – 25 January 2003) was a Danish wrestler. He competed in the men's Greco-Roman lightweight at the 1952 Summer Olympics. Rasmussen died on 25 January 2003, at the age of 79.
