= Gustav Freij =

Swedish wrestler (1922–1973)

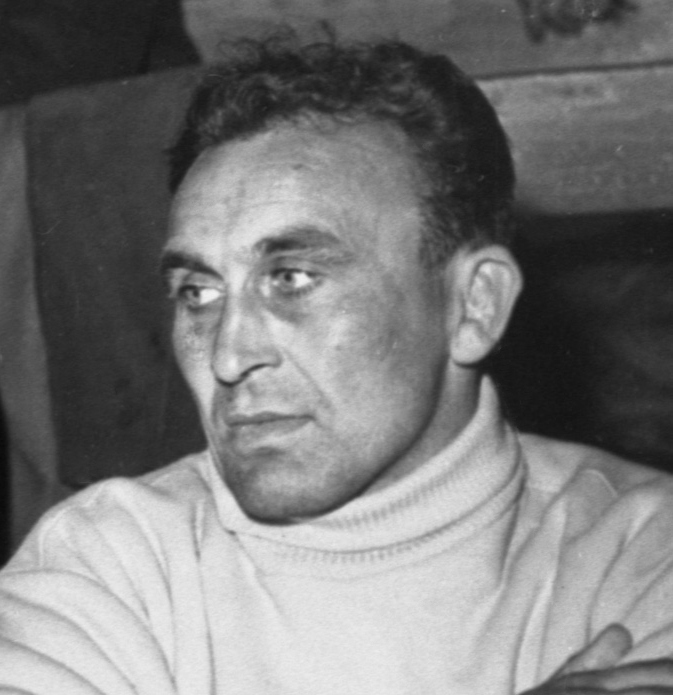
- Gustav Freij in 1952

Personal information
- Born: 17 March 1922 Malmö, Sweden
- Died: 4 August 1973 (aged 51) Malmö, Sweden
- Height: 1.70 m (5 ft 7 in)
- Weight: 67 kg (148 lb)

Sport
- Sport: Greco-Roman wrestling
- Club: IK Sparta, Malmö
Medal record
Men's Greco-Roman wrestling
Representing Sweden
Olympic Games
Gold medal – first place	1948 London	Lightweight
Silver medal – second place	1952 Helsinki	Lightweight
Bronze medal – third place	1960 Rome	Lightweight
World Championships
Gold medal – first place	1953 Naples	67 kg
Silver medal – second place	1950 Stockholm	67 kg
Bronze medal – third place	1955 Karlsruhe	67 kg

Karl Gustav Herbert Freij (17 March 1922 – 4 August 1973) was a Swedish wrestler. He competed in the Greco-Roman lightweight (−67 kg) category at the 1948, 1952 and 1960 Olympics and finished in first, second and third place, respectively. He missed the 1956 Games due to an injury.

After retiring from competitions Freij worked at the Allhems printing plant in Malmö. He died of ALS, aged 51. A memorial wrestling tournament is held in Sweden in his honor. His nephew Leif Freij also became an Olympic wrestler.
