= Kató Lomb =

Hungarian interpreter and translator

- Born: 8 February 1909; Pécs, Hungary
- Died: 9 June 2003 (aged 94); Budapest, Hungary
- Occupation: Interpreter
- Known for: Polyglottism

Kató Lomb (8 February 1909 – 9 June 2003) was a Hungarian interpreter, translator and one of the first simultaneous interpreters in the world. Originally educated in chemistry and physics, her interest soon led her to languages. Native in Hungarian, she could interpret fluently in nine or ten languages (in four, without preparation), translated technical literature, and read belles-lettres in six languages. She understood journalism in a further 11 languages. She stated that she worked professionally with 16 languages (Bulgarian, Chinese, Danish, English, French, German, Hebrew, Italian, Japanese, Latin, Polish, Romanian, Russian, Slovak, Spanish and Ukrainian), which she learnt from self-study due to her interest in them.

According to her own account, her life was highlighted not primarily by her use of languages, but by her study of them. This was described in her books, conversations and interviews. As an interpreter, she visited 40 countries on five continents, and documented her experiences in her book (Egy tolmács a világ körül, "An Interpreter Around the World" ISBN 963-280-779-0).

== Languages ==
In her interview with the Hetek newspaper (1998), Lomb listed the following 16 languages as those she worked in professionally:

Bulgarian, Chinese, Danish, English, French, German, Hebrew, Italian, Japanese, Latin, Polish, Romanian, Russian, Slovak, Spanish, Ukrainian

In the foreword to the first edition of her book How I Learn Languages (1970), she wrote:

"I only have one mother tongue: Hungarian. Russian, English, French, and German live inside me simultaneously with Hungarian. I can switch between any of these languages with great ease, from one word to the next.
Translating texts in Italian, Spanish, Japanese, Chinese, and Polish generally requires me to spend about half a day brushing up on my language skills and perusing the material to be translated.
The other six languages I know only through translating literature and technical material."

In the fourth edition of How I Learn Languages (1995), she wrote:

"I would simply like to tell how I, over 25 years, got to the point of being able to speak 10 languages, translate technical documents and enjoy fiction in six more, and understand written journalism in 11 more or so."

In her book Harmony of Babel (1988), she wrote:

"How many languages do I speak? I have only one mother tongue: Hungarian. I speak Russian, German, English, and French well enough to be able to interpret or translate between any of them extemporaneously. I have to prepare a bit for Spanish, Italian, Japanese, Chinese, and Polish. At such times I leaf through the parts of my diaries written in these languages. I can read Swedish, Norwegian, Romanian, Portuguese, Dutch, Bulgarian, and Czech literature; I can translate their written—political or technical—texts."

Lomb cited Danish, Hebrew, Latin, Slovak and Ukrainian only in the Hetek interview, and Czech, Dutch, Norwegian, Portuguese and Swedish only in the Harmony of Babel. Altogether, she classified her languages as follows:

- Hungarian, English, German, French, and Russian, in which she felt truly proficient
- Italian, Spanish, Japanese, Chinese and Polish, in which she was able to interpret after some preparation
- Romanian and Bulgarian, at lower levels of proficiency
- Five more languages, mentioned in both places (see above)

...for a total of 22 languages.

In Polyglot: How I Learn Languages, she referred to more languages she also understood. Including these, she claimed to know at least 28 languages (including Hungarian) at least at a level enabling her to comprehend written texts, out of which she was able to interpret in ten.

According to her account, she acquired the languages above in this order: French (at elementary school, at the age of approx. 10–14); Latin (before and/or partly during her university studies); English (from 1933, on her own; this was when she developed her subsequent method of learning languages); Russian (from 1941, on her own; enabled her to understand Ukrainian, as well as Bulgarian to some extent); Romanian (on her own); Chinese (approx. from 1950, in two years, at a university course); Polish (around 1955, at a course); Japanese (from 1956, on her own); Czech (1954, on her own; similar to Slovak); Italian (on her own, after some antecedents in the 1940s); Spanish (in the second half of the 1960s, on her own); German.

== Learning method and principles ==
(Invested Time × Motivation)/Inhibition = Result

Lomb's guiding principle was interest: The word, coming from Latin interesse (originally meaning "to be between"), has a double meaning, referring to the material profit or the mental attraction, together: motivation. She wrote, "This means that I can answer these questions: How much am I interested in it? What do I want with it? What does it mean for me? What good is it for me?" She didn't believe in natural "language talent". She tended to express the language skill and its fruitfulness with a fraction, with motivation in the numerator (as well as invested time—although, as she wrote, "If there is true motivation, one can pinch off some ten minutes a day even with the busiest job"), and inhibition in the denominator (the fear of starting to speak, of being clumsy, of being laughed at). In her conviction, the stronger the motivation, and the more one could put aside inhibition, the sooner one could possess a language.

As she put it, she drove three autos in the world of languages, namely autolexia, autographia and autologia. (from Greek, auto- meaning self, and -lexia, -graphia and -logia referring to reading, writing and speaking respectively.) Autolexia means reading for myself: the book I discover by myself, which provides novelties again and again, which I can take with me anywhere, which won't get tired of being asked questions. Autographia means writing for myself, when I try to write about my thoughts, experiences, everyday things in the very language I'm just learning, no matter if it's silly, no matter if it's incorrect, no matter if a word or two is left out. Autologia means speaking with myself, when I try to express my thoughts or what I see on the street in the language I'm studying, when I keep on chatting to myself.

Even she was bored with the fabricated dialogues of coursebooks, so her favourite method was to obtain an original novel in a language completely unknown to her, whose topic she personally found interesting (a detective story, a love story, or even a technical description would do), and that was how she deciphered, unravelled the basics of the language: the essence of the grammar and the most important words. She didn't let herself be set back by rare or complicated expressions: she skipped them, saying: what is important will sooner or later emerge again and will explain itself if necessary. ("It's much more of a problem if the book becomes flavourless in our hands due to the many interruptions than not learning if the inspector watches the murderer from behind a blackthorn or a hawthorn.") So we don't really need to look up each and every word in the dictionary: it only spoils our mood from the joy of reading and discovering the texts. In any case, what we can remember is what we have figured out ourselves. For this purpose, she always bought her own copies of books, since while reading she wrote on the edge of the pages what she had understood from the text by herself. This way one cannot avoid picking up something of a language—as one can't rest until one has learnt who the murderer is, or whether the girl says yes in the end. (This method was, incidentally, applied successfully even before her, by a Hungarian writer, Dezső Kosztolányi as well: according to his account, he studied Portuguese practically exactly the same way during a holiday of his.)

Another keyword of hers was context (she was playfully called Kati Kontext herself): on the one hand, in understanding a text (be it a book or a heard text) the context is relevant, it can help us several times if we don't understand something; on the other hand, she never studied words separately, isolated, but they either remained in her mind based on the text she read or the context she encountered, or she memorized them embedded in phrases (e.g. high wind, keen wind), so if one comes to forget one of them, the other word often used together with it will trigger the former. From adjectival phrases, we can even recall the gender in many cases. Kató Lomb recommended using patterns, templates, "shoemaker's lasts" or "cookie-cutters" elsewhere as well: these are simple, skeletonized sample sentences for a structure or an idiom, elements which can be inserted into the speech like prefabricated slabs (generally in the first person singular), by applying them we can more easily construct even fairly complicated structures.

== Quotes ==
Szilard Kato, the daughter of a prominent local physician, was born and raised in Pecs, where she went to the University to earn her degrees. She moved to Budapest after age 21, where she met and married Laub (later the family changed the name to Lomb) Frigyes, an engineer from a prominent family of electrical engineers. As a young adult, she became interested in other languages while in the family's bomb shelter as Russian troops were advancing on Budapest. She was quoted by her family as having said the following: "Kids, we are going to have to learn Russian now...". She managed to acquire a Russian typewriter and started learning the language. This single step started her on the road to a long and illustrious career in languages. As the Russian liberation unfolded, she served for a time as the translator for the Russian Commander of Budapest. In later years she became a professional interpreter. She acquired high levels of proficiency in 17 languages without extended stays in the countries where the languages were spoken. I interviewed Dr. Lomb (her PhD was in Chemistry) in depth ten years ago in Budapest. She attributed her success to massive amounts of comprehensible input, mostly through recreational reading. She was personally very interested in grammar and linguistics but felt they played a small role in language acquisition, loved dictionaries but looked up words when she read only if the word re-appeared several times and she still did not understand it, and hated to be corrected: "Error correction makes you sick to your stomach."

– From:

- Krashen, S. and Kiss, N., Notes on a polyglot (1996), pg. 207–210
- Krashen, S., "Explorations in Language Acquisition and Use: The Taipei Lectures", Portsmouth, NH; Heinemann Publishing Company (2003)

About six years ago I met a woman in Hungary named Lomb Kato, a professional translator who had acquired 17 languages. At the time we met she was 86. Her last words to me changed my life: "Stephen, you are so young. So many years left, so many languages to acquire!" (I was 54 at the time.) What an inspiration! Since then I have plunged back into second language acquisition.

– Stephen Krashen (source 1, source 2)

== Works ==
=== In Hungarian ===
- Így tanulok nyelveket (Egy tizenhat nyelvű tolmács feljegyzései) – "This is how I learn languages (Notes of a sixteen-language interpreter)", 1970, 1972, 1990, 1995 (ISBN 963-602-617-3)
- Egy tolmács a világ körül – "An interpreter around the world", 1979 (ISBN 963-280-779-0)
- Nyelvekről jut eszembe... – "Languages remind me...", 1983 (ISBN 963-500-230-0)
- Bábeli harmónia (Interjúk Európa híres soknyelvű embereivel) – "Harmony of Babel (interviews with famous multilingual people in Europe)", 1988 (ISBN 963-282-023-1)

=== Known translations ===
==== In English ====
- Polyglot: How I Learn Languages, 2008 (ISBN 978-1-60643-706-3). The first two editions (2008) are available online for download (PDF) at tesl-ej.org. The 2011 edition, with updates not available in the PDF versions, is available from Amazon and Lulu [dot] com.
- Harmony of Babel: Profiles of Famous Polyglots of Europe – 2nd Edition, 2018 (ISBN 978-1-5323-6611-6). The second edition has an Editor's Preface (new) and the transcript of an interview Dr. Lomb gave to Hungarian TV in 1974, translated by Ádám Szegi. The book is available from Lulu [dot] com. The book is available online for download (PDF) at tesl-ej.org.

- Harmony of Babel: Profiles of Famous Polyglots of Europe, 2013 (ISBN 978-1-4675-3912-8). The book is available online for download (PDF) at tesl-ej.org. The printed book is available from Amazon and Lulu [dot] com.

- With Languages in Mind: Musings of a Polyglot, 2016 (ISBN 978-1-4951-4066-2). The book is available online for download (PDF) at tesl-ej.org. The printed book is available from Amazon and Lulu [dot] com.

==== Other languages ====
- Как я изучаю языки (Kak ya izuchayu yaziki), 1978, 1996 (in Russian)
- わたしの外国語学習法 (Watashi no gaikoku-go gakushū-hō) ISBN 4-7943-0159-6, ISBN 4-480-08543-2, ISBN 978-4-480-08543-6 (in Japanese)
- Par valodām man nāk prātā, 1990 (ISBN 5-7966-0477-5) (in Latvian)
- Kaip aš mokausi kalbų, 1984 (in Lithuanian)
- 《我是怎样学外语的》 (Wǒ shì zěnyàng xué wàiyǔ de), May 1982, (second print) October 1983 (in Chinese), translated by 叶瑞安 (Ye Rui'an), proofread/edited by 单继达 (Shan Jida), published by 外语教学与研究出版社 (Foreign Language Teaching and Research Press), Beijing Foreign Studies Institute
- 《我是如何学习外语的》 (Wǒ shì rúhé xuéxí wàiyǔ de), May 1983 (in Chinese), translated by 名菊 (Míng Ju), published by 黑龙江人民出版社 (Heilongjiang People's Publishing House)
- Kuidas ma keeli õpin – ehk Kuutteist keelt oskava tõlgi märkmed (Tallinn: Verb, 2016; ISBN 9789949969074; translated by Sander Liivak) (in Estonian)
- 언어 공부 - 16개 국어를 구사하는 통역사의 외국어 공부법, 2017 (ISBN 9788955619447) (in Korean)

The Chinese editions were translated from the Russian version.

(Translations in more languages also might exist)
