= Bjørn Larsson =

Norwegian sport wrestler (1924–2021)

Bjørn Larsson (18 October 1924 – 23 November 2021) was a Norwegian sport wrestler. He competed in the 1952 Summer Olympics, where he reached the second round. He represented the club IF Ørnulf. Larsson died on 23 November 2021, at the age of 97.
