= Ahmet Şenol =

Turkish wrestler (1926–2019)

Personal information
- Nationality: Turkish
- Born: 5 March 1926
- Died: 7 April 2019 (aged 93)

Sport
- Sport: Wrestling

Ahmet Şenol (5 March 1926 – 7 April 2019) was a Turkish wrestler. He competed at the 1948 Summer Olympics and the 1952 Summer Olympics.
