= Raimo Lukander =

Finnish footballer (1934-2005)

Personal information
- Date of birth: 18 April 1934
- Date of death: 27 August 2005 (aged 71)
- Position: Forward

Senior career*
Years	Team	Apps	(Gls)
1954-1961	Pallo-Pojat		
1962-1964	Helsingin Palloseura	41	(1)
1965	Helsingin Jalkapalloklubi	2	(0)

International career
1961	Finland	1	(0)
- * Club domestic league appearances and goals

Raimo Lukander (18 April 1934 – 27 August 2005) was a Finnish footballer. He played in one match for the Finland national football team in 1961. He spent his career playing for clubs in Helsinki. In Mestaruussarja he played 100 games and scored 14 goals. He also played in second division where he scored 23 goals.
