= Leon Lyon =

Puerto Rican sports shooter

Personal information
- Born: 3 August 1918 Payette, Idaho, United States
- Died: 17 January 2003 (aged 84) San Juan, Puerto Rico

Sport
- Sport: Sports shooting

Leon Lyon (3 August 1918 – 17 January 2003) was a Puerto Rican sports shooter. He competed at the 1960 Summer Olympics and the 1964 Summer Olympics in the Men's Rapid-Fire Pistol, 25 metres event.
