= Leonia Janecka =

Polish painter

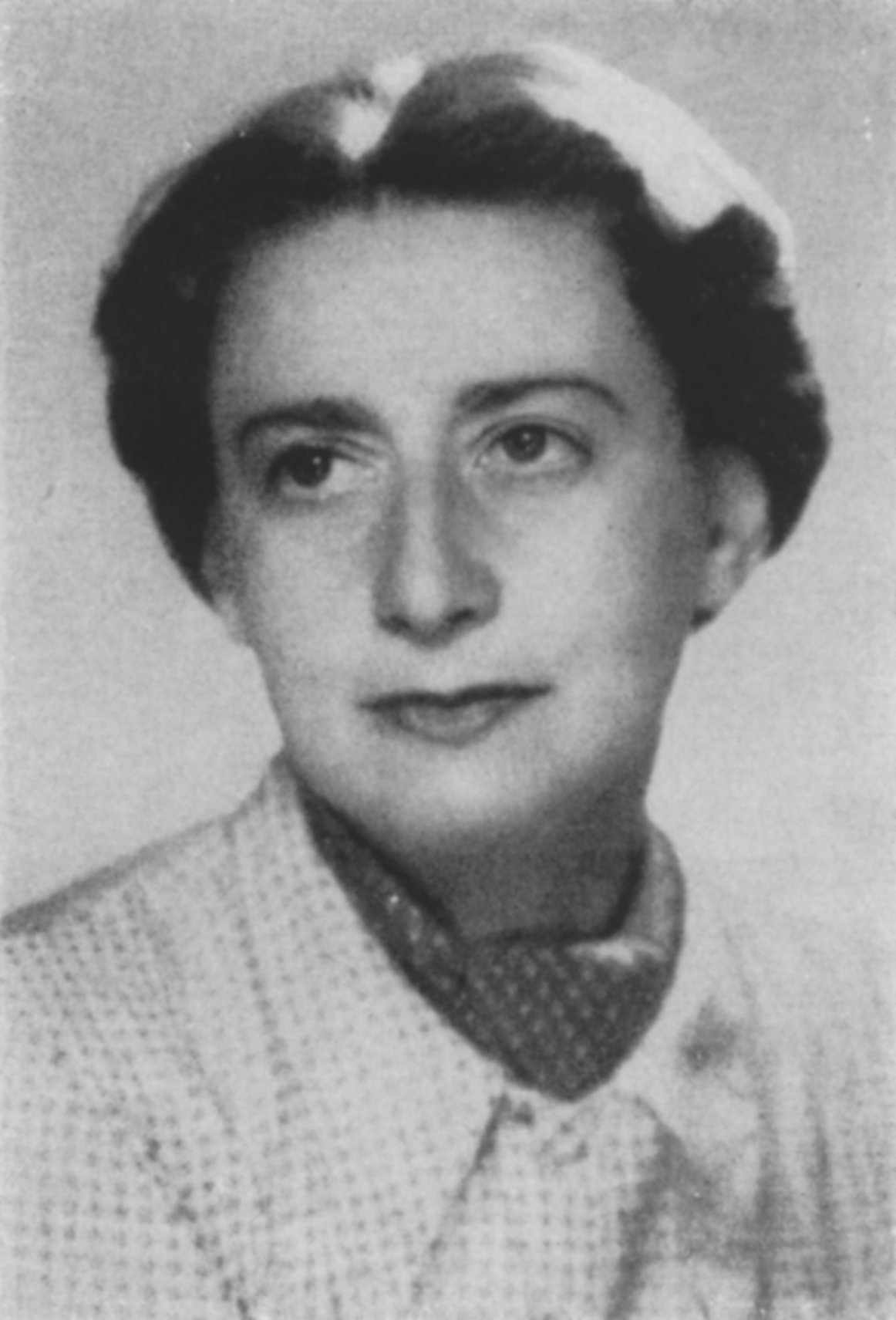
- Leonia Janecka (before 1965)
- Born: Leonia Nadelman; 20 July 1909; Warsaw, Poland
- Died: 2 January 2003 (aged 93); Warsaw, Poland
- Occupation: Painter

Leonia Janecka, born Leonia Nadelman (20 July 1909 – 2 January 2003), was a Polish painter and illustrator. Her work was part of the art competitions at the 1928 Summer Olympics and the 1932 Summer Olympics.
