= Aage Eriksen =

Norwegian Greco-Roman wrestler (1917–1998)

Personal information
- Full name: Aage Ingvar Eriksen
- Nationality: Norwegian
- Born: 5 May 1917 Notodden, Norway
- Died: 17 June 1998 (aged 81) Notodden, Norway

Sport
- Sport: Wrestling
Medal record
Men's Greco-Roman wrestling
Representing Norway
Olympic Games
Silver medal – second place	1948 London	Lightweight

Aage Ingvar Eriksen (5 May 1917 – 17 June 1998) was a Norwegian wrestler and Olympic medalist in Greco-Roman wrestling.

== Olympics ==
Eriksen competed at the 1948 Summer Olympics in London where he received a silver medal in Greco-Roman wrestling, the lightweight class.

== National champion ==
- 10 times (Greco-Roman), between years 1937-55.
- 2 times (freestyle wrestling), between years 1937-55.

He represented the club SK Snøgg.
