= André Verdaine =

French wrestler

Personal information
- Nationality: French
- Born: 9 May 1923 Paris, France
- Died: 13 August 2005 (aged 82) Paris, France

Sport
- Sport: Wrestling

André Pierre Verdaine (9 May 1923 – 13 August 2005) was a French wrestler. He competed in the men's Greco-Roman lightweight at the 1952 Summer Olympics.
