= Rudolf Styskalik =

Austrian water polo player (1929–2005)

Personal information
- Nationality: Austrian
- Born: 18 May 1929
- Died: 26 August 2005 (aged 76)

Sport
- Sport: Water polo

Rudolf Styskalik (18 May 1929 – 26 August 2005) was an Austrian water polo player. He competed in the men's tournament at the 1952 Summer Olympics.
