= Armenak Yaltyryan =

Personal information
- Born: 13 May 1914 Krym, Rostov Oblast, Russian Empire
- Died: 18 December 1999 (aged 85) Krym, Rostov Oblast, Russia

Sport
- Sport: Freestyle wrestling
- Club: Dynamo Kyiv
- Coached by: Aleksandr Pustynnikov
Medal record
Representing the Soviet Union
European Championships
Silver medal – second place	1947 Prague	-67 kg

Armenak "Aram" Yaltyryan (Russian: Ялтырян, Ukrainian: Ялтирян, 13 May 1914 – 18 December 1999) was a Soviet lightweight wrestler. He won a silver medal at the 1947 European Championships and placed fourth at the 1952 Summer Olympics.

Yaltyryan was born to an Armenian family in the village of Krym, Rostov Oblast, Russia. He took up wrestling in 1934 and competed in the lightweight division both in Greco-Roman and freestyle wrestling. He won the Soviet title in 1938–1940 and 1945–1952 in freestyle and in 1946–1948 in Greco-Roman wrestling. His career was interrupted by World War II, when he fought in the Battle of Kiev and was taken a prisoner of war. He retired in 1952 and then had a long career as a wrestling coach in Ukraine. His trainees include Vladimir Sinyavsky, Boris Gurevich, Yury Gusov and Vladimir Gulyutkin. In 1986 he returned to Krym, where he continued to coach wrestlers until his death in 1999.
