= Julien Vandierendounck =

Belgian footballer

Personal information
- Date of birth: 12 February 1921
- Date of death: 1 August 2005 (aged 84)

International career
Years	Team	Apps	(Gls)
1950	Belgium	1	(0)

Julien Vandierendounck (12 February 1921 – 1 August 2005) was a Belgian footballer. He played in one match for the Belgium national football team in 1950.
