= Eero Virtanen =

Finnish wrestler

Personal information
- Nationality: Finnish
- Born: 22 October 1915 Vaajakoski, Finland
- Died: 1 June 2003 (aged 87) Jyväskylän maalaiskunta, Finland

Sport
- Sport: Wrestling

Eero Virtanen (22 October 1915 – 1 June 2003) was a Finnish wrestler. He competed in the men's Greco-Roman lightweight at the 1948 Summer Olympics.
