= Kamal Hussain (wrestler) =

Egyptian wrestler

Personal information
- Nationality: Egyptian
- Born: 24 January 1932 (age 94)

Sport
- Sport: Wrestling

Kamal Hussain (born 24 January 1932) is an Egyptian wrestler. He competed in the men's Greco-Roman lightweight at the 1952 Summer Olympics.
