= Frank Mulville =

Australian rugby league footballer (1915–2003)

Personal information
- Full name: Francis James Mulville
- Born: 8 August 1915 Maclean, New South Wales, Australia
- Died: 17 June 2003 (aged 87)

Playing information
- Position: Second-row, Lock
Club
Years	Team	Pld	T	G	FG	P
1940–41	Newtown Jets	14	4	0	0	12
Representative
Years	Team	Pld	T	G	FG	P
1940	New South Wales	3	0	0	0	0

Francis James Mulville (8 August 1915 – 17 June 2003) was an Australian rugby league footballer.

A forward, Mulville began his career at hometown club Maclean Magpies in the Northern Rivers, which he followed up with a stint in Newcastle, before making his way to Sydney.

Mulville spent the 1940 NSWRFL season with the Newtown Jets, primarily as a second rower, and earned New South Wales representative honours against Queensland. After starting the 1941 season with Newtown, Mulville made an attempt to join St. George, but was ruled ineligible due to not meeting residency requirements. He decided to sign instead for Waratah-Mayfield in the Newcastle league, rather than remain with Newtown.
