= Tapio Pylkkönen =

Finnish footballer (1923-2005)

Personal information
- Date of birth: 6 February 1923
- Date of death: 22 August 2005 (aged 82)
- Position: Defender

International career
Years	Team	Apps	(Gls)
1948–1952	Finland	25	(0)

Tapio Pylkkönen (6 February 1923 – 22 August 2005) was a Finnish footballer. He played in 25 matches for the Finland national football team from 1948 to 1952. He was also part of Finland's squad for the 1952 Summer Olympics, but he did not play in any matches.
