= O Tae-geun =

South Korean wrestler

Personal information
- Nationality: South Korean
- Born: 12 December 1927

Sport
- Sport: Wrestling

O Tae-geun (Korean: 오태근, born 12 December 1927) was a South Korean wrestler. He competed at the 1952 Summer Olympics and the 1956 Summer Olympics.
