= George Senick =

Canadian ice hockey player

- Born: September 16, 1929; Saskatoon, Saskatchewan, Canada
- Died: January 13, 2003 (aged 73)
- Height: 6 ft 0 in (183 cm)
- Weight: 205 lb (93 kg; 14 st 9 lb)
- Position: Left wing
- Shot: Left
- Played for: New York Rangers
- Playing career: 1947–1966

George Senick (September 16, 1929 in Saskatoon, Saskatchewan - January 13, 2003) was a Canadian ice hockey player. He played 13 games in the National Hockey League with the New York Rangers during the 1952–53 season. The rest of his career, which lasted from 1947 to 1966, was spent in the minor leagues.

== Career statistics ==
=== Regular season and playoffs ===
			Regular season					Playoffs
Season	Team	League	GP	G	A	Pts	PIM	GP	G	A	Pts	PIM
1946–47	Saskatoon Quakers	N-SJHL	23	21	28	49	66	2	0	0	0	0
1947–48	Omaha Knights	USHL	62	20	23	43	81	3	0	0	0	0
1948–49	Seattle Ironmen	PCHL	55	26	16	42	166	—	—	—	—	—
1948–49	Houston Huskies	USHL	5	0	0	0	0	—	—	—	—	—
1949–50	Seattle Ironmen	PCHL	70	31	31	62	145	4	2	1	3	6
1950–51	Seattle Ironmen	PCHL	16	6	4	10	28	—	—	—	—	—
1950–51	Saskatoon Quakers	WCSHL	15	13	13	26	45	8	10	8	18	4
1951–52	Saskatoon Quakers	PCHL	67	26	23	49	98	13	11	10	21	24
1952–53	New York Rangers	NHL	13	2	3	5	8	—	—	—	—	—
1952–53	Saskatoon Quakers	WHL	48	27	46	73	61	13	5	9	14	14
1953–54	Saskatoon Quakers	WHL	43	21	21	42	51	6	3	2	5	19
1954–55	Saskatoon Quakers	WHL	34	10	11	21	20	—	—	—	—	—
1954–55	Spokane Flyers	WIHL	11	7	10	7	19	4	3	2	5	4
1955–56	Regina/Brandon Regals	WHL	66	34	37	71	71	—	—	—	—	—
1956–57	Seattle Americans	WHL	50	26	26	52	40	—	—	—	—	—
1957–58	Sudbury Wolves	OHA Sr	50	26	32	58	59	7	2	4	6	18
1958–59	Sudbury Wolves	OHA Sr	30	11	15	26	74	1	0	0	0	0
1959–60	Saskatoon Quakers	SSHL	20	26	22	48	54	7	14	13	27	12
1959–60	Saskatoon Quakers	Al-Cup	—	—	—	—	—	6	1	3	4	10
1960–61	Yorkton Terriers	SSHL	1	1	0	1	0	—	—	—	—	—
1960–61	Saskatoon Quakers	SSHL	13	12	16	28	33	1	0	0	0	2
1960–61	Saskatoon Quakers	Al-Cup	—	—	—	—	—	13	13	8	21	25
1961–62	Saskatoon Quakers	SSHL	29	30	54	84	60	8	6	17	23	20
1962–63	Saskatoon Quakers	SSHL	28	44	38	82	47	11	5	21	26	23
1964–65	Saskatoon Quakers	SSHL	5	3	10	13	4	—	—	—	—	—
1965–66	Saskatoon Quakers	SSHL	30	27	32	59	40	12	8	15	23	15
WHL totals			241	118	141	259	243	19	8	11	19	33
NHL totals			13	2	3	5	8	—	—	—	—	—
