= Franco Benedetti =

Italian Greco-Roman wrestler (1932–2009)

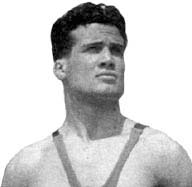

Personal information
- Born: 30 October 1932 Alghero, Italy
- Died: 11 November 2009 (aged 77)
- Height: 1.71 m (5 ft 7 in)
- Weight: 73 kg (161 lb)

Sport
- Sport: Greco-Roman wrestling
Medal record
Men's wrestling (Greco-Roman)
Representing Italy
World Championships
Bronze medal – third place	1953 Naples	-73 kg

Franco Benedetti (30 October 1932 – 11 November 2009) was a Greco-Roman wrestler from Italy. He competed at the 1952 and 1960 Olympics and finished in 5th and 12th place, respectively. He won a bronze medal at the 1953 World Wrestling Championships.
