= Sanders Sims =

American hockey player (1921–2003)

Personal information
- Full name: Sanders Scott Sims
- Nationality: American
- Born: June 1, 1921 Philadelphia, Pennsylvania, U.S.
- Died: January 5, 2003 (aged 81) Cambridge, New York, U.S.

Sport
- Sport: Field hockey

Sanders Scott Sims (June 1, 1921 – January 5, 2003) was an American field hockey player. He competed in the men's tournament at the 1948 Summer Olympics.
