= Johannes Munnikes =

Dutch wrestler

Personal information
- Nationality: Dutch
- Born: 5 September 1916 Amsterdam, Netherlands
- Died: 1 June 2003 (aged 86) Amsterdam, Netherlands

Sport
- Sport: Wrestling

Johannes Munnikes (5 September 1916 – 1 June 2003) was a Dutch wrestler. He competed in the men's Greco-Roman lightweight at the 1948 Summer Olympics.
