= Pilar Bellosillo =

Spanish teacher and Catholic feminist (1913–2003)

- Born: 22 December 1913; Madrid, Spain
- Died: 2 January 2003 (aged 89); Madrid, Spain
- Education: Teresian Association

Pilar Bellosillo García-Verde (22 December 1913 – 2 January 2003) was a Spanish teacher and Catholic feminist. As a lay auditor, she was one of the few women to take part in the Second Vatican Council. She also co-founded the NGO Manos Unidas, was member of the Pontifical Council for the Laity and was recognised for her work in promoting the role of women in the Church.

In 2019 the process for her beatification began.

== Early life ==
Bellosillo was born on 22 December 1913 in Madrid, Spain. She was the second of eight children, and her family had ties to the village of Derroñadas, in the province of Soria.

Between 1931 and 1935, Bellosillo trained as a teacher at the Veritas Academy of the Teresian Association in Madrid, where she met its founder, Pedro Poveda Castroverde, and studied Social Work at the School of Family and Social Training.

== Career ==
She began working as a volunteer at the Catholic Action Academy for Working Women, and during the Spanish Civil War, in 1938, she attended a course for Catholic Action leaders in Zaragoza. Between 1940 and 1946 she led the Catholic Action youth groups, and between 1951 and 1963 she was president of Catholic Action women’s branch; in the latter role she was responsible for the Plan for the Formation of the Female Personality and established the Centres for Popular Culture. In 1959, Bellosillo launched the Campaign Against Hunger, which later became the NGO Manos Unidas. She championed a humanist feminism, highlighting the role of women in the Church in what she called a “moment of liberation”.

Pope Paul VI appointed her a lay auditor at the Second Vatican Council in September 1964, alongside 22 other women from around the world and Bellosillo was the only from Spain. They attended for the first time at the third session of the Council on 14 September 1964 and were welcomed by the Pope. She was a member of the commission tasked with drafting Schema XIII for the preparation of the Pastoral Constitution Gaudium et spes and of the Commission on Marriage and the Family, and was twice appointed spokesperson for the group of women auditors; in this latter role, she tried unsuccessfully to ensure that the group could speak in the Council chamber and in fact she was twice refused the opportunity to speak in public. On 23 November 1965, Bellosillo and the other female lay auditors, together with their male counterparts, published a joint declaration to report on the work that had been done.

She was president of the World Union of Catholic Women’s Organisations between 1961 and 1974, which she joined in 1952. In her role, she championed initiatives such as the "Women’s Education" programme, which in 1970 brought about a major breakthrough for women in education, and projects aimed at working in developing countries. Bellosillo took part as an observer at the 1971 Synod of Bishops in the Catholic Church, when Canadian Cardinal George Flahiff’s call for the abolition of discrimination against women led to the creation of the Pontifical Commission on Women in 1973 by Pope Paul VI, of which she was a member. She was also consultor of the Pontifical Council for the Laity.

Towards the end of Francisco Franco’s dictatorship, Bellosillo became involved in the underground movement of the Christian democratic group Democratic Left, founded by Joaquín Ruiz-Giménez, a personal friend of Bellosillo. Once democracy had been restored, Adolfo Suárez’s government appointed her as a member of the Board of Trustees for the Protection of Women. She devoted her final years to working with the Ecumenical Forum of Christian Women in Europe and the Spanish Forum for Women’s Studies.

In 2019, in the Archdiocese of Madrid the preliminary phase of her beatification process began.

== Death ==
Bellosillo died on 2 January 2003 in Madrid at the age of 89.
