= Georgios Petmezas =

Greek wrestler

Personal information
- Nationality: Greek
- Born: 22 March 1915
- Died: 1999 (aged 83–84)

Sport
- Sport: Wrestling

Georgios Petmezas (22 March 1915 – 1999) was a Greek wrestler. He competed at the 1948 Summer Olympics and the 1952 Summer Olympics.
