= Jan Cools =

Belgian wrestler (1918–1989)

Personal information
- Full name: Jan Albert Elisa Cools
- Nationality: Belgian
- Born: 1 October 1918 Antwerp, Belgium
- Died: 23 October 1989 (aged 71) Antwerp, Belgium

Sport
- Sport: Wrestling

Jan Albert Elisa Cools (1 October 1918 – 23 October 1989) was a Belgian wrestler. He competed at the 1948 Summer Olympics and the 1952 Summer Olympics. Cools died in Antwerp on 23 October 1989, at the age of 71.
