= Heini Nettesheim =

German wrestler

Personal information
- Nationality: German
- Born: 22 October 1915; Cologne, Germany
- Died: 18 October 2005 (aged 89); Cologne, Germany

Sport
- Sport: Wrestling

Heini Nettesheim (22 October 1915 – 18 October 2005) was a German wrestler. He competed at the 1936 Summer Olympics and the 1952 Summer Olympics.
