= Metty Scheitler =

Luxembourgish wrestler

Personal information
- Nationality: Luxembourgish
- Born: 1 August 1915; Esch-sur-Alzette, Luxembourg
- Died: 10 September 1972 (aged 57)

Sport
- Sport: Wrestling

Metty Scheitler (1 August 1915 – 10 September 1972) was a Luxembourgish wrestler. He competed at the 1936 Summer Olympics and the 1952 Summer Olympics.
