= Takeo Shimotori =

Japanese wrestler (born 1928)

Takeo Shimotori (霜鳥 武雄, Shimotori Takeo; born 2 October 1928) is a Japanese former wrestler who competed in the 1952 Summer Olympics.
