= Arístides Pérez =

Guatemalan wrestler

Personal information
- Nationality: Guatemalan
- Born: 31 August 1933 (age 91)

Sport
- Sport: Wrestling

Arístides Pérez (born 31 August 1933) is a Guatemalan wrestler. He competed in two events at the 1952 Summer Olympics.
