= Deaths in February 2003 =

The following is a list of notable deaths in February 2003.

Entries for each day are listed alphabetically by surname. A typical entry lists information in the following sequence:

- Name, age, country of citizenship at birth, subsequent country of citizenship (if applicable), reason for notability, cause of death (if known), and reference.

== February 2003 ==
=== 1 ===
- Anne Burr, 84, American actress (Native Son, The Hasty Heart, As the World Turns).
- Carrenza Howard, 89, American baseball player.
- Bodil Kjer, 85, Danish actress.
- Richard Lyng, 84, American administrator, United States Secretary of Agriculture (1986-1989).
- Adalberto Ortiz, 88, Ecuadorian writer.
- Mongo Santamaría, 85, Cuban Latin jazz percussionist.
- Nancy Whiskey, 67, Scottish folk singer ("Freight Train").
- Crew of STS-107 killed in the Space Shuttle Columbia disaster:
  - Michael P. Anderson, 43, American, payload commander.
  - David M. Brown, 46, American, mission specialist.
  - Kalpana Chawla, 40, American, mission specialist.
  - Laurel Clark, 41, American, mission specialist.
  - Rick Husband, 45, American, commander.
  - William C. McCool, 41, American, pilot.
  - Ilan Ramon, 48, Israeli, payload specialist.

=== 2 ===
- Randy Chin, 65, Jamaican record producer, diabetes.
- Bjørner Drøger, 90, Danish Olympic rower (1936).
- Tom Edmunds, 77, Australian politician.
- József Gál, 84, Hungarian Olympic wrestler (1952).
- Lou Harrison, 85, American composer, noted for his microtonal works, heart attack.
- Jack Lauterwasser, 98, English racing cyclist, cycling engineer, and Olympian (1928), fall at home.
- Richard C. Lee, 86, American politician, Mayor of New Haven, Connecticut.
- Won-kuk Lee, 95, South Korean martial artist (Chung Do Kwan).
- Marcello Truzzi, 67, American professor of sociology, cancer.
- Emerson Woelffer, 88, American abstract expressionist artist and teacher.
- Eizo Yuguchi, 57, Japanese football player and Olympian (1968), stomach cancer.

=== 3 ===
- Fulgencio Berdugo, 84, Colombian football player.
- Teresa Brennan, 51, Australian philosopher and academic, traffic collision.
- Natascha Artin Brunswick, 93, German-American mathematician and economist.
- Lana Clarkson, 40, American actress (Fast Times at Ridgemont High, Scarface, Barbarian Queen), shot by record producer Phil Spector.
- Venanzo Crocetti, 89, Italian sculptor.
- João César Monteiro, 64, Portuguese film director, actor, writer and film critic, lung cancer.
- Trevor Morris, 82, Welsh footballer and World War II pilot.
- Peter Schat, 67, Dutch composer, cancer.

=== 4 ===
- Charles McLaren, 3rd Baron Aberconway, 89, British industrialist and horticulturalist.
- Benyoucef Benkhedda, 82, Algerian politician, head of Provisional Government of the Algerian Republic (1961–1962).
- Charlie Biddle, 76, American-Canadian jazz bassist, played with Thelonious Monk and Charlie Parker.
- John Biolo, 86, American football player (Green Bay Packers).
- Jean Brossel, 84, French physicist and modern quantum optics pioneer.
- Pierre Carteus, 59, Belgian football player.
- Jerome Hines, 81, American operatic bass.
- Marie Menheer, 78, American baseball player.
- Jim Mertz, 86, American baseball player (Washington Senators).
- Qalandar Momand, 72, Pakistani poet and writer.
- James Needs, 83, British film editor.
- André Noyelle, 71, Belgian road racing cyclist and Olympian (1952).
- Jaroslav Šajtar, 81, Czech chess master.

=== 5 ===
- Helge Boes, 32, German-American CIA officer and lawyer, explosion.
- Guillermo González Calderoni, 54, Mexican Federal Judicial Police official, murdered.
- René Cardona Jr., 63, Mexican filmmaker and actor.
- Micky Fenton, 89, England football player.
- Larry LeSueur, 93, American journalist, Parkinson's disease.
- Julio Sabater, 76, Puerto Rican sprinter and Olympian (1948).
- Antonina Shuranova, 66, Russian stage, television and film actress.
- Simon Tozer, 69, British Olympic rower (1956).
- Joseph P. Vigorito, 84, American politician (U.S. Representative for Pennsylvania's 24th congressional district).
- Manfred von Brauchitsch, 97, German auto racing driver, winner of three Grand Prix races in the 1930s.

=== 6 ===
- Eric Ashby, 85, English naturalist and wildlife cameraman.
- José Craveirinha, 80, Mozambican journalist, story writer and poet.
- Arthur Doherty, 71, Irish politician.
- René Haby, 83, French politician.
- Túlio Miraglia, 73, Brazilian Olympic sports shooter (1972).
- Robert William St. John, 100, American author, broadcaster, and journalist.
- Peter Saunders, 91, British theatre impresario.

=== 7 ===
- Jim Cominsky, 84, American basketball player (Rochester Royals).
- François Désbonnet, 82, French Olympic water polo player (1948).
- Luigi Ferrando, 91, Italian racing cyclist
- György Müller, 64, Hungarian swimmer and Olympian (1960).
- Amalia Nieto, 95, Uruguayan painter, engraver and sculptor.
- Malcolm Roberts, 58, English pop singer, heart attack .
- Stephen Whittaker, 55, British actor and director (Nicholas Nickleby, Sons and Lovers), complications following surgery.

=== 8 ===
- Alfred Aston, 90, French football winger and manager.
- Hank Blade, 82, Canadian ice hockey player (Chicago Black Hawks).
- William Louis Culberson, 73, American lichenologist, cancer.
- John Charles Cutler, 87, American surgeon.
- Augusto Monterroso, 81, Honduran writer, heart failure.
- Jan Płonka, 82, Polish Olympic alpine skier (1952).
- K. K. Soundar, 78, Tamil film actor.
- Alice Treff, 96, German film actress.
- Konrad Weichert, 68, German Olympic sailor (1968, 1972).

=== 9 ===
- Tanya Anacleto, 26, Mozambican swimmer and Olympian (2000).
- Herma Bauma, 88, Austrian javelin thrower and Olympian (1936, 1948, 1952).
- Ruby Braff, 75, American jazz trumpeter and cornetist.
- Masatoshi Gündüz Ikeda, 76, Japanese-Turkish mathematician.
- Ken McKinlay, 74, British speedway rider.
- Billy Parker, 61, American baseball player (California Angels), cancer.
- Vera Ralston, 82, Czech-American figure skater and "B" actress, star of ice capades, and Olympian (1936), cancer.
- Nikolay Teterkin, 78, Soviet Russian Olympic canoeist (1952).
- Ebeneser Þórarinsson, 71, Icelandic Olympic cross-country skier (1952).

=== 10 ===
- Chuck Aleno, 85, American baseball player (Cincinnati Reds).
- Ralph Beard, 73, American baseball player (St. Louis Cardinals).
- Antoni Czubiński, 74, Polish historian.
- Edgar de Evia, 92, American photographer, pneumonia.
- Antoinette Feuerwerker, 90, French jurist and member of the French Resistance during World War II.
- Curt Hennig, 44, American professional wrestler, drug overdose.
- Lars-Eric Kjellgren, 84, Swedish screenwriter and film director.
- José Lewgoy, 82, American-Brazilian actor.
- Clark MacGregor, 80, American politician and congressman (1961–1970).
- Robert Rush Miller, 86, American zoologist and ichthyologist.
- Walter Thomas James Morgan, 102, British biochemist.
- Max Pécas, 77, French filmmaker, writer and producer, lung cancer.
- Jan Veselý, 79, Czech cyclist and Olympian (1952).
- Carmen Vidal, 87, Spanish cosmetologist and businesswoman.
- Ron Ziegler, 63, former press secretary for Richard Nixon during the Watergate Scandal, heart attack.

=== 11 ===
- Socorro Avelar, 77, Mexican actress, stomach cancer.
- Arndt Bause, 66, German composer, pulmonary embolism.
- Alfons Flinik, 76, Polish Olympic field hockey player (1952, 1960).
- Marc Iliffe, 30, British strongman, suicide by hanging.
- Daniel Toscan du Plantier, 61, French film producer, heart attack.
- Moses Hogan, 45, American composer and arranger of choral music, brain cancer.
- Nobuyoshi Sadanaga, 74, Japanese Olympic long-distance runner (1960).
- Jaroslav Šourek, 75, Czech long-distancer runner and Olympian (1952).
- Luke Chia-Liu Yuan, 90, Chinese-American physicist and grandson of Yuan Shikai.

=== 12 ===
- Wally Burnette, 73, American baseball player (Kansas City Athletics).
- Ron Eland, 79, South African weightlifter and Olympian (1948).
- Michel Graillier, 56, French jazz pianist.
- Vali Myers, 72, Australian artist, cancer.
- Devendra Satyarthi, 94, Indian folklorist and writer.
- Jeanne Stuart, 94, British stage and film actress.
- Haywood Sullivan, 72, American baseball player (Boston Red Sox, Kansas City Athletics) and owner (Boston Red Sox), stroke.
- Dick Whitman, 82, American baseball player (Brooklyn Dodgers, Philadelphia Phillies).
- Kemmons Wilson, 90, American businessman, founder of Holiday Inn.

=== 13 ===
- Joe Connelly, 85, American television and radio scriptwriter.
- James Thomas Flexner, 95, American historian and biographer.
- Kid Gavilán, 77, Cuban world boxing champion, heart attack.
- Robert Ivers, 68, American actor.
- Axel Jensen, 71, Norwegian author, ALS.
- Stacy Keach, Sr., 88, American actor (Pretty Woman, Teen Wolf, The Parallax View).
- Stuart Keith, 71, British-American ornithologist.
- Olle Ljunggren, 82, Swedish Olympic middle-distance runner (1948).
- Leonor Llausás, 73, Mexican actress, heart attack.
- Walt Whitman Rostow, 86, American political advisor.

=== 14 ===
- Dolly, 6, the world's first cloned mammal, euthanization following a lung disease.
- Gunnar Johansson, 78, Swedish football player and manager.
- Joseph Peter Kinneary, 97, American district judge (United States District Court for the Southern District of Ohio).
- Johnny Longden, 96, American jockey.
- Paul E. Meehl, 83, American clinical psychologist.
- Ulrich Mense, 76, German Olympic sailor (1964).
- Grigory Mkrtychan, 78, Soviet and Russian ice hockey goalkeeper and Olympian (1956).
- Anil Nandy, 79-80, Indian footballer and Olympian (1948).
- Archie Savage, 88, American dancer, choreographer, and film and theatre actor.
- Giuseppe Spagnoli, 56, Italian wrestler and Olympian (1976).

=== 15 ===
- Aldo Albera, 80, Italian Olympic canoeist (1952).
- Vincent Apap, 93, Maltese sculptor.
- Alexander Bennett, 73, British ballet dancer, teacher and ballet master, principal dancer with the Royal Ballet.
- Miroslav Horníček, 84, Czech actor, writer, director, and artist.
- H. Dale Jackson, 72, American Baptist minister.
- Vlastimil Koubek, 75, Czech-American architect, cancer.
- Roberto Leydi, 74, Italian ethnomusicologist.
- Gwyn Manning, 87, Welsh footballer and Olympian (1948).
- Fritz Pollard, 87, American athlete and Olympic medalist (1936).
- Francisque Ravony, 60, Malagasy lawyer and politician, heart attack.
- Joaquín Solano, 89, Mexican Olympic medalist in equestrianism (1948).
- Moe White, 83, Canadian ice hockey player (Montreal Canadiens).
- Richard Wilberforce, Baron Wilberforce, 95, British judge.

=== 16 ===
- Philip John Gardner, 88, British recipient of the Victoria Cross.
- Jim Gordon, 76, American television and radio newscaster, cancer.
- István Havasi, 72, Hungarian race walker and Olympian (1964).
- Abu Ishaque, 76, Bangladeshi novelist.
- Jean Van Leer, 83, Belgian Olympic field hockey player (1952, 1956).
- Rusty Magee, 47, American composer of musicals, cancer.
- Aleksandar Tišma, 79, Serbian novelist.

=== 17 ===
- Steve Bechler, 23, American baseball player (Baltimore Orioles), heat stroke complicated by ephedra misuse.
- Julian Bigelow, 89, American computer engineer, built one of the first digital computers (IAS machine).
- Allen Britton, 88, American music educator, contributed to the history of music pedagogy.
- Donald J. Porter, 81, American district judge (United States District Court for the District of South Dakota).
- Pete Schrum, 68, American actor.

=== 18 ===
- Quentin Anderson, 90, American literary critic and cultural historian (Henry James, Ralph Waldo Emerson, Walt Whitman), heart attack.
- Ittla Frodi, 72, Swedish actress, writer and producer.
- Giacomo Gesino, 85, Italian Olympic wrestler (1948).
- Isser Harel, 90/91, Israeli spymaster and director of the Mossad.
- Beth Marion, 90, American B-movie actress, stroke.
- Roberto Villacián, 74, Cuban Olympic gymnast (1948).

=== 19 ===
- Washington Beltrán, 88, Uruguayan politician, President (1965–1966).
- Buck Divecha, 75, Indian cricket player.
- Igor Gorbachyov, 75, Soviet and Russian actor, theater director and pedagogue.
- James Hardy, 84, American pioneer surgeon.
- Tanya Moiseiwitsch, 88, English theatre designer.
- Johnny Paycheck, 64, American country music singer, pulmonary emphysema.

=== 20 ===
- Maurice Blanchot, 95, French writer, philosopher and literary theorist.
- Orville Freeman, 84, American politician, Governor of Minnesota and Secretary of Agriculture, Alzheimer's disease.
- Harry Jacunski, 87, American gridiron football player (Green Bay Packers).
- Tore Karlsson, 78, Swedish Olympic boxer (1948).
- Masatoshi Kobayashi, 54, Japanese Olympic luger (1972).
- Ty Longley, 31, American guitarist for the heavy metal band Great White; victim in the Station nightclub fire.
- Mushaf Ali Mir, 55, Pakistan statesman and air force general, Chief of Air Staff (since 2000), plane crash.
- Pat Morton, 82, South African Olympic wrestler (1948).
- Golam Mustafa, 67, Bangladeshi actor and reciter.
- Jerzy Passendorfer, 79, Polish film director and member of parliament.
- Abdul Razzaq Anjum, 50, Pakistani air force officer, Deputy Chief of the Air Staff (since 2000), plane crash.
- Robert Grier Stephens, Jr., 89, American politician, member of the United States House of Representatives (1961-1977).
- Peter Tewksbury, 79, American film and television director.
- Rizwan Ullah Khan, 45, Pakistani air force officer, plane crash.

=== 21 ===
- Virginia Biddle, 92, American revue performer, showgirl, and nude model, complications following car accident.
- Jim Courtright, 88, Canadian track and field athlete and Olympian (1936).
- John E. Fryer, 65, American psychiatrist and gay rights activist, pneumonia.
- Tom Glazer, 88, American folk singer and songwriter.
- Karel Kosik, 76, Czech marxist philosopher.
- Nelly Mazloum, 73, Egyptian actress, dancer, and choreographer.
- Nora Ney, 96, Polish film actress.
- Kevin O'Shea, 77, American basketball player (Minneapolis Lakers, Milwaukee Hawks, Baltimore Bullets).
- Rusty Peters, 88, American baseball player (Philadelphia Athletics, Cleveland Indians, St. Louis Browns).
- Eddie Thomson, 55, Scottish football player and coach, lymphoma.

=== 22 ===
- Kurt Gscheidle, 78, German politician.
- Donald Haldeman, 55, American sport shooter and Olympic gold medalist (1972, 1976).
- Jean-Pierre Miquel, 66, French actor and theatre director, cancer.
- Daniel Taradash, 90, American screenwriter (From Here to Eternity, Hawaii, Storm Center), Oscar winner (1955), pancreatic cancer.

=== 23 ===
- Shlomo Argov, 73, Israeli diplomat, Ambassador of Israel to the United Kingdom.
- Keith De Casseres, 92, Jamaican Olympic sports shooter (1960).
- Manfred Donike, 42, German Olympic cyclist (1984).
- Howie Epstein, 47, American bass player for Tom Petty and the Heartbreakers, drug overdose.
- Christopher Hill, 91, British historian.
- Pavel Lebeshev, 63, Soviet and Russian cinematographer.
- Robert K. Merton, 92, American sociologist.
- Marcel Prawy, 91, Austrian dramaturg and opera critic.
- Hasanagha Turabov, 64, Azerbaijani and Soviet actor.
- Titos Vandis, 85, Greek actor (The Exorcist, Fletch Lives, Mary Hartman, Mary Hartman), cancer.

=== 24 ===
- Alex Cameron, 65, American English professor and pronouncer of the Scripps National Spelling Bee.
- Al Hibbs, 78, American mathematician and physicist known as "The Voice of JPL".
- Susan Johnson, 75, American actor and singer, pulmonary emphysema.
- Sam King, 91, English golfer.
- Antal Lippay, 79, Hungarian Olympic hurdler (1952).
- Bernard Loiseau, 52, French chef, suicide by gunshot.
- Walter Scharf, 92, American film composer, heart failure.
- Alberto Sordi, 82, Italian comedy actor, heart attack.
- Antoni Torres, 59, Spanish footballer, cancer.
- Güven Önüt, 63, Turkish football player.

=== 25 ===
- Nick Daukas, 80, American football player (Brooklyn Dodgers).
- Alexander Kemurdzhian, 81, Armenian scientist and aerospace engineer.
- Iosif Kovács, 81, Romanian footballer and Olympian (1952).
- John Lecky, 62, Canadian sport rower and Olympian (1960).
- Eric Marsh, 82, English cricket player.
- Tom O'Higgins, 86, Irish Fine Gael politician, barrister and judge.
- René Römer, 73, Dutch academic and Governor of the Netherlands Antilles (1983-1990).

=== 26 ===
- Harold Amos, 84, American microbiologist and professor, chairman of Harvard Medical School bacteriology department.
- Brian Evans, 60, Welsh football player, cancer.
- Akira Fujiwara, 80, Japanese historian.
- Christian Goethals, 74, Belgian racing driver.
- Pavlos Lespouridis, 44, Greek weightlifter and Olympian (1980, 1984).
- Jaime Ramírez, 71, Chilean football player.

=== 27 ===
- Johnny Carpenter, 88, American film actor, screenwriter and producer, cancer.
- Charles Knott, 88, English cricket player.
- John Lanchbery, 79, British-Australian musician.
- Wolfgang Larrazábal, 91, Venezuelan naval officer and politician.
- James D. Nichols, 74, American horse racing jockey, rode in seven U.S. Triple Crown races.
- Edythe Perlick, 80, American baseball player.
- Peter Petroff, 83, Bulgarian-American inventor, engineer, NASA scientist, and adventurer.
- Fred Rogers, 74, American television (Mister Rogers' Neighborhood), stomach cancer.
- Othar Turner, 95, American fife player.

=== 28 ===
- Albert Batteux, 83, French football player and manager, Alzheimer's disease.
- Alfred Bernstein, 92, American civil rights, civil liberties and union activist.
- Göte Blomqvist, 75, Swedish ice hockey player and Olympian (1952).
- Chris Brasher, 74, British track and field athlete and Olympian (1952, 1956).
- Jacob E. Davis, 97, American politician, member of the United States House of Representatives (1941-1943).
- Dinos Dimopoulos, 81, Greek film director.
- Jim Fridley, 78, American baseball player (Cleveland Indians, Baltimore Orioles, Cincinnati Redlegs).
- Fidel Sánchez Hernández, 85, President of El Salvador, heart attack.
- Yō Inoue, 56, Japanese voice actress (Mobile Suit Gundam, Yu-Gi-Oh!, Gordian Warrior), lung cancer.
- Rudolf Kingslake, 99, English academic, lens designer, and engineer.
- Vic Lindskog, 88, American football player (Stanford Cardinal, Philadelphia Eagles).
- Major Sundarrajan, 67, Indian actor and director.
