= 2003 in film =

2003 in film is an overview of events, including the highest-grossing films, award ceremonies, festivals, a list of country- and genre- specific lists of films released, notable deaths and film debuts.

== Highest-grossing films ==
The top 10 films released in 2003 by worldwide gross are as follows:

Highest-grossing films of 2003
| Rank | Title | Distributor | Worldwide gross |
|---|---|---|---|
| 1 | The Lord of the Rings: The Return of the King | New Line | $1,118,887,224 |
| 2 | Finding Nemo | Buena Vista | $871,014,978 |
| 3 | The Matrix Reloaded | Warner Bros. | $739,412,035 |
| 4 | Pirates of the Caribbean: The Curse of the Black Pearl | Buena Vista | $654,264,015 |
| 5 | Bruce Almighty | Universal / Buena Vista | $484,592,874 |
| 6 | The Last Samurai | Warner Bros. | $454,627,263 |
| 7 | Terminator 3: Rise of the Machines | Warner Bros. / Sony / Columbia | $433,371,112 |
| 8 | The Matrix Revolutions | Warner Bros. | $427,343,298 |
| 9 | X2 | 20th Century Fox | $407,711,549 |
| 10 | Bad Boys II | Sony / Columbia | $273,339,556 |

The Lord of the Rings: The Return of the King grossed more than $1.14 billion, making it the highest-grossing film in 2003 worldwide and in North America and the second-highest-grossing film up to that time. It was also the second film to surpass the billion-dollar milestone after Titanic in 1997.

Finding Nemo was the highest-grossing animated movie of all time until being overtaken by Shrek 2 in 2004.

== Events ==
- February 24: The Pianist, directed by Roman Polanski, wins 7 César Awards: Best Film, Best Director, Best Actor, Best Sound, Best Production Design, Best Original Music and Best Cinematography.
- June 12: Gregory Peck dies of bronchopneumonia.
- June 29: Katharine Hepburn dies of cardiac arrest.
- November 17: Arnold Schwarzenegger sworn in as Governor of California.
- December 22: Both of the movies from the Matrix trilogy released in 2003 were shut out of visual effects Oscar consideration by the Visual Effects Award Nominating Committee.
- December 31: The Academy of Motion Picture Arts and Sciences mails nomination ballots in which it qualifies 254 films released in 2003 as eligible for Oscar consideration.

=== Award ceremonies ===
- 8th Empire Awards

== Awards ==
| Category/Organization | 9th Critics' Choice Awards January 10, 2004 | 61st Golden Globe Awards January 25, 2004 | | 57th BAFTA Awards February 15, 2004 | Producers, Directors, Screen Actors, and Writers Guild Awards | 76th Academy Awards February 29, 2004 |
| Category/Organization | 9th Critics' Choice Awards January 10, 2004 | Drama | Musical or Comedy | 57th BAFTA Awards February 15, 2004 | Producers, Directors, Screen Actors, and Writers Guild Awards | 76th Academy Awards February 29, 2004 |
|---|---|---|---|---|---|---|
| Best Film | The Lord of the Rings: The Return of the King | | Lost in Translation | The Lord of the Rings: The Return of the King | | |
| Best Director | Peter Jackson; The Lord of the Rings: The Return of the King | | | Peter Weir; Master and Commander: The Far Side of the World | Peter Jackson; The Lord of the Rings: The Return of the King | |
| Best Actor | Sean Penn; Mystic River | | Bill Murray; Lost in Translation | | Johnny Depp; Pirates of the Caribbean: The Curse of the Black Pearl | Sean Penn; Mystic River |
| Best Actress | Charlize Theron; Monster | | Diane Keaton; Something's Gotta Give | Scarlett Johansson; Lost in Translation | Charlize Theron; Monster | |
| Best Supporting Actor | Tim Robbins; Mystic River | | | Bill Nighy; Love Actually | Tim Robbins; Mystic River | |
| Best Supporting Actress | Renée Zellweger; Cold Mountain | | | | | |
| Best Screenplay, Adapted | Jim Sheridan, Kirsten Sheridan and Naomi Sheridan; In America | Sofia Coppola; Lost in Translation | | Philippa Boyens, Peter Jackson and Fran Walsh; The Lord of the Rings: The Return of the King | Shari Springer Berman and Robert Pulcini; American Splendor | Philippa Boyens, Peter Jackson and Fran Walsh; The Lord of the Rings: The Return of the King |
| Best Screenplay, Original | Jim Sheridan, Kirsten Sheridan and Naomi Sheridan; In America | Sofia Coppola; Lost in Translation | | Tom McCarthy; The Station Agent | Sofia Coppola; Lost in Translation | |
| Best Animated Film | Finding Nemo | —N/a | —N/a | —N/a | —N/a | Finding Nemo |
| Best Original Score | The Lord of the Rings: The Return of the King; Howard Shore | | | Cold Mountain; T-Bone Burnett and Gabriel Yared | —N/a | The Lord of the Rings: The Return of the King; Howard Shore |
| Best Original Song | "A Mighty Wind"; A Mighty Wind | "Into the West"; The Lord of the Rings: The Return of the King | | —N/a | —N/a | "Into the West"; The Lord of the Rings: The Return of the King |
| Best Foreign Language Film | The Barbarian Invasions | Osama | | In This World | —N/a | The Barbarian Invasions |

Palme d'Or (56th Cannes Film Festival):

Elephant, directed by Gus Van Sant, United States

Golden Lion (60th Venice International Film Festival):

The Return (Возвращение), directed by Andrey Zvyagintsev, Russia

Golden Bear (53rd Berlin International Film Festival):

In This World, directed by Michael Winterbottom, United Kingdom

== 2003 films ==
=== By country/region ===
- List of American films of 2003
- List of Argentine films of 2003
- List of Australian films of 2003
- List of Bangladeshi films of 2003
- List of British films of 2003
- List of Canadian films of 2003
- List of Chinese films of 2003
- List of French films of 2003
- List of Hong Kong films of 2003
- List of Indian films of 2003
  - List of Bengali films of 2003
  - List of Hindi films of 2003
  - List of Kannada films of 2003
  - List of Malayalam films of 2003
  - List of Marathi films of 2003
  - List of Punjabi films of 2003
  - List of Tamil films of 2003
  - List of Telugu films of 2003
- List of Japanese films of 2003
- List of Mexican films of 2003
- List of Pakistani films of 2003
- List of Russian films of 2003
- List of South Korean films of 2003
- List of Spanish films of 2003

=== By genre/medium ===
- List of action films of 2003
- List of animated feature films of 2003
- List of avant-garde films of 2003
- List of crime films of 2003
- List of comedy films of 2003
- List of drama films of 2003
- List of horror films of 2003
- List of science fiction films of 2003
- List of thriller films of 2003
- List of western films of 2003

== Births ==
- January 2 – Cyrus Arnold, American actor
- January 4 – Jaeden Martell, American actor
- February 4 – Edvin Ryding, Swedish actor
- February 6 - Fabian Penje, Swedish actor
- February 20
  - Olivia Rodrigo, American actress and singer
  - William Gao, English actor and singer
- March 1 – Yasmeen Fletcher, American actress and musician
- March 3 – Thomas Barbusca, American actor
- March 6 – Millicent Simmonds, American actress
- March 12 – Malina Weissman, American actress
- March 20 – Cooper Hoffman, American actor
- April 3 – Elsie Fisher, American actress
- April 9 – Lilia Buckingham, American actress, author and dancer
- April 13 – Jean Paulo Campos, Brazilian actor
- April 30 – Emily Carey, English actress and model
- May 1 – Lizzy Greene, American actress
- May 19
  - Daiken Okudaira, Japanese actor
  - JoJo Siwa, American singer, actress and YouTuber
- May 24 - Megan Stott, American actress
- June 1
  - Emjay Anthony, American actor
  - Shailyn Pierre-Dixon, Canadian actress
- June 2 – Jeremy Ray Taylor, American actor
- June 3 – Louis Partridge, English actor
- June 16 – Anna Cathcart, Canadian actress
- June 18 – Bailey Bass, American actress
- June 29 – Alexys Nycole Sanchez, American actress
- July 1 – Storm Reid, American actress
- July 9 – Marcel Ruiz, Puerto Rican actor
- July 13
  - Hannah Cheramy, Canadian actress
  - Wyatt Oleff, American actor
- August 18 – Max Charles, American actor
- August 25 – Iñaki Godoy, Mexican actor
- August 26 - Jake Ryan, American actor
- August 28
  - Lexi Underwood, American actress and singer
  - Quvenzhané Wallis, American actress
- August 30 – Yasmin Finney, English actress
- September 3 – Jack Dylan Grazer, American actor
- September 8 - Nicolas Cantu, American actor
- September 18 – Aidan Gallagher, American actor and musician
- September 24 – Joe Locke, Manx actor
- September 25 – Bella Ramsey, English actress
- September 26 – Sam Nivola, English actor
- October 27 - Gavin Lewis, American actor
- November 7
  - Lara McDonnell, Irish actress
  - Park Ji-hu, South Korean actress
- November 26 - Asha Banks, English actress and singer
- December 22 – Joe Anders, American-British actor

== Deaths ==
| Month | Date | Name | Age | Country | Profession | Notable films |
|---|---|---|---|---|---|---|
| January | 1 | Royce D. Applegate | 63 | US | Actor | O Brother, Where Art Thou?; Gettysburg |
| January | 1 | Cyril Shaps | 79 | UK | Actor | The Spy Who Loved Me; Erik the Viking |
| January | 4 | Conrad Hall | 72 | French Polynesia | Cinematographer | American Beauty; Cool Hand Luke |
| January | 5 | Massimo Girotti | 84 | Italy | Actor | Senso; Last Tango in Paris |
| January | 8 | Ron Goodwin | 77 | UK | Composer | Where Eagles Dare; Frenzy |
| January | 11 | Anthony Havelock-Allan | 98 | UK | Producer | Romeo and Juliet; Great Expectations |
| January | 11 | Maurice Pialat | 77 | France | Director, Screenwriter | À Nos Amours; Under the Sun of Satan |
| January | 11 | Dick Simmons | 89 | US | Stuntman, Actor | Rear Window; Sergeant York |
| January | 12 | Maurice Gibb | 53 | Isle of Man | Singer, Composer, Actor | Saturday Night Fever; Sgt. Pepper's Lonely Hearts Club Band |
| January | 13 | Norman Panama | 88 | US | Screenwriter, Director | White Christmas; The Court Jester |
| January | 14 | Mel Bourne | 79 | US | Production Designer | The Fisher King; The Natural |
| January | 14 | Paul Monash | 85 | US | Screenwriter, Producer | The Friends of Eddie Coyle; The Front Page |
| January | 14 | Donald O'Brien | 72 | Ireland | Actor | Grand Prix; Run, Man, Run |
| January | 17 | Richard Crenna | 76 | US | Actor | First Blood; The Sand Pebbles |
| January | 20 | David Battley | 67 | UK | Actor | Willy Wonka & the Chocolate Factory; Krull |
| January | 20 | Nedra Volz | 94 | US | Actress | 10; Earth Girls Are Easy |
| January | 21 | John Grieve | 78 | UK | Actor | Eye of the Needle; The Thirty Nine Steps |
| January | 23 | Nell Carter | 54 | US | Actress | The Grass Harp; Modern Problems |
| January | 25 | Cliff Norton | 84 | US | Actor | Harry and Tonto; Kiss Me, Stupid |
| January | 25 | Leopoldo Trieste | 85 | Italy | Actor, Screenwriter | The Godfather: Part II; Cinema Paradiso |
| January | 29 | Anthony Eisley | 78 | US | Actor | The Naked Kiss; Star! |
| January | 30 | Mary Ellis | 105 | US | Singer, Actress | Paris in Spring; Fatal Lady |
| January | 31 | William Marlowe | 72 | UK | Actor | Cry Freedom; The Heroes of Telemark |
| February | 3 | Lana Clarkson | 40 | US | Actress | Scarface; Fast Times at Ridgemont High |
| February | 7 | Stephen Whittaker | 55 | UK | Actor, Director | To Sir, with Love; The Keep |
| February | 9 | Vera Hruba Ralston | 82 | Czech Republic | Actress | The Fighting Kentuckian; Dakota |
| February | 13 | Robert Ivers | 68 | US | Actor, Voice Double | Broken Lance; A Kiss Before Dying |
| February | 13 | Stacy Keach Sr. | 88 | US | Actor | Pretty Woman; Saturday the 14th |
| February | 18 | Jack Brodsky | 70 | US | Producer | Romancing the Stone; Daddy Day Care |
| February | 22 | Daniel Taradash | 89 | US | Screenwriter | From Here to Eternity; Hawaii |
| February | 24 | Walter Scharf | 92 | US | Composer, Orchestrator | Willy Wonka & the Chocolate Factory; Winchester '73 |
| February | 24 | Alberto Sordi | 82 | Italy | Actor, Screenwriter, Director | The Great War; I Vitelloni |
| March | 3 | Horst Buchholz | 69 | Germany | Actor | The Magnificent Seven; Life is Beautiful |
| March | 8 | Adam Faith | 62 | UK | Actor, Singer | McVicar; Stardust |
| March | 8 | Karen Morley | 93 | US | Actress | Gabriel Over the White House; Scarface |
| March | 12 | Lynne Thigpen | 54 | US | Actress | The Warriors; Lean on Me |
| March | 15 | Thora Hird | 91 | UK | Actress | One Good Turn; The Quatermass Xperiment |
| March | 13 | Christiane Schmidtmer | 63 | Germany | Actress | Ship of Fools; The Big Doll House |
| March | 16 | Lars Passgård | 62 | Sweden | Actor | Through a Glass Darkly; The Fuller Report |
| March | 18 | Naomi Chance | 73 | UK | Actress | The Trials of Oscar Wilde; The Gambler and the Lady |
| March | 19 | Rick Zumwalt | 51 | US | Actor | Batman Returns; Over the Top |
| March | 24 | Philip Yordan | 88 | US | Screenwriter | The Harder They Fall; El Cid |
| March | 27 | Paul Zindel | 66 | US | Screenwriter | Runaway Train; Mame |
| March | 30 | Michael Jeter | 50 | US | Actor | The Green Mile; Jurassic Park III |
| March | 31 | Anne Gwynne | 84 | US | Actress | House of Frankenstein; Dick Tracy Meets Gruesome |
| April | 1 | Leslie Cheung | 46 | Hong Kong | Actor, Singer | A Better Tomorrow; Farewell My Concubine |
| April | 1 | Jean-Yves Escoffier | 52 | France | Cinematographer | Good Will Hunting; Nurse Betty |
| April | 2 | Michael Wayne | 68 | US | Producer | McLintock!; The Green Berets |
| April | 4 | Anthony Caruso | 86 | US | Actor | The Asphalt Jungle; Sylvia |
| April | 7 | David Greene | 82 | UK | Director | Godspell; Gray Lady Down |
| April | 8 | Kathie Browne | 72 | US | Actress | Man's Favorite Sport?; Cinderfella |
| April | 8 | Bing Russell | 76 | US | Actor | Suicide Battalion; Ride a Violent Mile |
| April | 9 | Vera Zorina | 86 | Germany | Actress | Follow the Boys; Louisiana Purchase |
| April | 12 | Sydney Lassick | 80 | US | Actor | One Flew Over the Cuckoo's Nest; Carrie |
| April | 16 | Graham Jarvis | 72 | Canada | Actor | Misery; Silkwood |
| April | 22 | Andrea King | 82 | US | Actress | Ride the Pink Horse; Dial 1119 |
| April | 25 | Jesse Nilsson | 25 | Canada | Actor | The Skulls; Model Behavior |
| April | 26 | Peter Stone | 73 | US | Screenwriter | Charade; The Taking of Pelham One Two Three |
| April | 28 | Ciccio Ingrassia | 80 | Italy | Actor | War Italian Style; Kaos |
| April | 30 | Jim Connors | 56 | US | Actor, Stuntman | Hook; Demolition Man |
| May | 3 | Suzy Parker | 70 | US | Actress | Kiss Them for Me; The Best of Everything |
| May | 6 | Lowell S. Hawley | 94 | US | Screenwriter | Swiss Family Robinson; Babes in Toyland |
| May | 6 | Jocelyn Herbert | 86 | UK | Production Designer | if....; The Hotel New Hampshire |
| May | 9 | Carmen Filpi | 80 | US | Actor | Ed Wood; Beetlejuice |
| May | 9 | Bernard Spear | 83 | UK | Actor | Chitty Chitty Bang Bang; The Man Who Cried |
| May | 14 | Wendy Hiller | 90 | UK | Actress | The Elephant Man; A Man for All Seasons |
| May | 14 | Robert Stack | 84 | US | Actor | Written on the Wind; Airplane! |
| May | 21 | Felice Orlandi | 78 | Italy | Actor | Bullitt; The Driver |
| May | 24 | Rachel Kempson | 92 | UK | Actress | Out of Africa; Tom Jones |
| May | 28 | Martha Scott | 90 | US | Actress | Ben-Hur; The Ten Commandments |
| May | 28 | Marc Zuber | 59 | India | Actor | Robin Hood: Prince of Thieves; Navy SEALs |
| May | 30 | Haskell Boggs | 94 | US | Cinematographer | The Bellboy; Teacher's Pet |
| June | 2 | Richard Cusack | 77 | US | Actor | The Fugitive; High Fidelity |
| June | 3 | John Jympson | 72 | UK | Film Editor | A Fish Called Wanda; Little Shop of Horrors |
| June | 7 | Trevor Goddard | 40 | UK | Actor | Mortal Kombat; Pirates of the Caribbean: The Curse of the Black Pearl |
| June | 11 | William Marshall | 78 | US | Actor | Blacula; Twilight's Last Gleaming |
| June | 12 | Gregory Peck | 87 | US | Actor, Producer | To Kill a Mockingbird; Roman Holiday |
| June | 15 | Hume Cronyn | 90 | Canada | Actor | Shadow of a Doubt; Cocoon |
| June | 15 | Philip Stone | 79 | UK | Actor | The Shining; Indiana Jones and the Temple of Doom |
| June | 16 | Carlos Rivas | 78 | US | Actor | The King and I; True Grit |
| June | 20 | Fielder Cook | 80 | US | Director | How to Save a Marriage and Ruin Your Life; Prudence and the Pill |
| June | 21 | George Axelrod | 81 | US | Screenwriter | Breakfast at Tiffany's; The Manchurian Candidate |
| June | 21 | Leon Uris | 78 | US | Screenwriter | Battle Cry; Gunfight at the O.K. Corral |
| June | 24 | Barbara Weeks | 89 | US | Actress | Rusty Rides Alone; The Violent Years |
| June | 27 | David Newman | 66 | US | Screenwriter | Bonnie and Clyde; Superman |
| June | 29 | Rod Amateau | 79 | US | Director, Screenwriter | Hook, Line & Sinker; Where Does It Hurt? |
| June | 29 | Katharine Hepburn | 96 | US | Actress | The Philadelphia Story; On Golden Pond |
| June | 30 | Buddy Hackett | 78 | US | Actor | It's a Mad, Mad, Mad, Mad World; The Music Man |
| June | 30 | Constance Smith | 75 | Ireland | Actress | Impulse; Treasure of the Golden Condor |
| July | 6 | Buddy Ebsen | 95 | US | Actor, Dancer | Breakfast at Tiffany's; Born to Dance |
| July | 7 | Elisabeth Welch | 99 | US | Actress | Cleopatra; Revenge of the Pink Panther |
| July | 8 | Marjorie Fowler | 82 | US | Film Editor | Doctor Dolittle; Conquest of the Planet of the Apes |
| July | 9 | Elliott Marks | 61 | US | Still Photographer | Annie; Rocky |
| July | 21 | Robert F. Blumofe | 93 | US | Producer, Executive | Bound for Glory; Yours, Mine and Ours |
| July | 23 | Sheila Bromley | 91 | US | Actress | Idol of the Crowds; Women in the Wind |
| July | 25 | John Schlesinger | 77 | UK | Director | Midnight Cowboy; Marathon Man |
| July | 27 | Karin Booth | 87 | US | Actress | Cripple Creek; Juke Box Rhythm |
| July | 27 | Bob Hope | 100 | US | Actor | The Paleface; Road to Morocco |
| July | 30 | Marian Carr | 77 | US | Actress | Kiss Me Deadly; Nightmare |
| July | 31 | Frederick Coffin | 60 | US | Actor | Wayne's World; Hard to Kill |
| August | 2 | Don Estelle | 70 | UK | Actor | Santa Claus: The Movie; A Private Function |
| August | 6 | Larry Taylor | 85 | UK | Actor, Stuntman | Zulu; Chitty Chitty Bang Bang |
| August | 9 | Gregory Hines | 57 | US | Actor, Dancer | The Cotton Club; Running Scared |
| August | 10 | Jacques Deray | 74 | France | Director, Screenwriter | Borsalino; Three Men to Kill |
| August | 30 | Charles Bronson | 81 | US | Actor | The Great Escape; Death Wish |
| September | 1 | Jack Smight | 78 | US | Director | Harper; Airport 1975 |
| September | 3 | David King-Wood | 89 | Iran | Actor | The Quatermass Xperiment; Private's Progress |
| September | 4 | Ben Aris | 66 | UK | Actor | The Plague of the Zombies; If.... |
| September | 6 | Louise Platt | 88 | US | Actress | Stagecoach; Forgotten Girls |
| September | 8 | Leni Riefenstahl | 101 | Germany | Director | Olympia; Tiefland |
| September | 11 | John Ritter | 54 | US | Actor | Problem Child; Sling Blade |
| September | 12 | Johnny Cash | 71 | US | Singer, Actor | Five Minutes to Live; A Gunfight |
| September | 14 | Jerry Fleck | 55 | US | Production Manager | Edward Scissorhands; Beetlejuice |
| September | 16 | Sheb Wooley | 82 | US | Actor | Hoosiers; The Outlaw Josey Wales |
| September | 20 | Tom Busby | 66 | Canada | Actor | The Dirty Dozen; The War Lover |
| September | 21 | Pamela Gordon | 66 | US | Actress | Weird Science; Poltergeist II: The Other Side |
| September | 22 | Gordon Jump | 71 | US | Actor | Conquest of the Planet of the Apes; Making the Grade |
| September | 24 | Lyle Bettger | 88 | US | Actor | The Greatest Show on Earth; Gunfight at the O.K. Corral |
| September | 25 | Herb Gardner | 68 | US | Screenwriter | A Thousand Clowns; I'm Not Rappaport |
| September | 26 | George Plimpton | 76 | US | Actor | Good Will Hunting; Reds |
| September | 27 | Fay Helm | 94 | US | Actress | Phantom Lady; Dangerous Intruder |
| September | 27 | Donald O'Connor | 78 | US | Actor, Dancer | Singin' in the Rain; There's No Business Like Show Business |
| September | 28 | Elia Kazan | 94 | Turkey | Director | A Streetcar Named Desire; On the Waterfront |
| October | 1 | Julie Parrish | 62 | US | Actress | The Nutty Professor; Fireball 500 |
| October | 3 | Florence Stanley | 79 | US | Actress | Atlantis: The Lost Empire; Bulworth |
| October | 5 | Denis Quilley | 75 | UK | Actor | King David; Murder on the Orient Express |
| October | 9 | Ruth Hall | 92 | US | Actress | The Man from Monterey; Local Boy Makes Good |
| October | 10 | Victoria Horne | 91 | US | Actress | Harvey; The Ghost and Mrs. Muir |
| October | 17 | Janice Rule | 72 | US | Actress | Invitation to a Gunfighter; The Ambushers |
| October | 17 | Bernard Schwartz | 85 | US | Producer | Coal Miner's Daughter; St. Elmo's Fire |
| October | 18 | David Lodge | 82 | UK | Actor | A Shot in the Dark; The Return of the Pink Panther |
| October | 19 | Guy Rolfe | 91 | UK | Actor | Ivanhoe; The Fall of the Roman Empire |
| October | 20 | Jack Elam | 82 | US | Actor | The Cannonball Run; Once Upon a Time in the West |
| October | 29 | Steve Yaconelli | 62 | US | Cinematographer | The Karate Kid Part III; Blue Sky |
| November | 8 | Bob Grant | 71 | UK | Actor | On the Buses; Mutiny on the Buses |
| November | 9 | Fred J. Brown | 68 | US | Sound Engineer | The Exorcist; First Blood |
| November | 9 | Art Carney | 85 | US | Actor | Harry and Tonto; The Late Show |
| November | 11 | Robert Brown | 82 | UK | Actor | James Bond; The Message |
| November | 12 | Jonathan Brandis | 27 | US | Actor | The NeverEnding Story II: The Next Chapter; Ladybugs |
| November | 12 | Whitfield Cook | 94 | US | Screenwriter | Stage Fright; Strangers on a Train |
| November | 12 | Kay E. Kuter | 78 | US | Actor | Sabrina; The Last Starfighter |
| November | 12 | Penny Singleton | 95 | US | Actress | Blondie; Jetsons: The Movie |
| November | 14 | Gene Anthony Ray | 41 | US | Actor | Fame; Austin Powers in Goldmember |
| November | 15 | David Holt | 76 | US | Actor | The Pride of the Yankees; Battleground |
| November | 15 | Dorothy Loudon | 78 | US | Actress | Midnight in the Garden of Good and Evil; Garbo Talks |
| November | 16 | Albert Nozaki | 91 | Japan | Art Director | The Ten Commandments; The War of the Worlds |
| November | 18 | Michael Kamen | 55 | US | Composer | Die Hard; Mr. Holland's Opus |
| November | 20 | Robert Addie | 87 | UK | Actor | Excalibur; Another Country |
| November | 23 | Patricia Burke | 86 | UK | Actress | Lisbon Story; Forbidden |
| November | 24 | Michael Small | 64 | US | Composer | Klute; Marathon Man |
| November | 26 | Gordon Reid | 64 | UK | Actor | Leon the Pig Farmer; The Others |
| November | 27 | Norman Burton | 79 | US | Actor | Planet of the Apes; The Towering Inferno |
| November | 28 | Edmund Hartmann | 92 | US | Screenwriter | The Lemon Drop Kid; The Caddy |
| November | 30 | Earl Bellamy | 86 | US | Director | Munster, Go Home!; Walking Tall Part 2 |
| December | 2 | Suzanne Cloutier | 80 | Canada | Actress, Producer | Othello; Doctor in the House |
| December | 3 | Ellen Drew | 88 | US | Actress | The Man from Colorado; The Baron of Arizona |
| December | 3 | David Hemmings | 62 | UK | Actor | Blow-Up; Gladiator |
| December | 7 | Robert R. Benton | 79 | US | Set Decorator | Top Gun; White Men Can't Jump |
| December | 10 | Sean McClory | 79 | Ireland | Actor | Mary Poppins; The Quiet Man |
| December | 14 | Jeanne Crain | 78 | US | Actress | State Fair; Leave Her to Heaven |
| December | 16 | Madlyn Rhue | 68 | US | Actress | It's a Mad, Mad, Mad, Mad World; A Majority of One |
| December | 17 | Alan Tilvern | 85 | UK | Actor | Who Framed Roger Rabbit; The Lord of the Rings |
| December | 19 | Hope Lange | 72 | US | Actress | The Best of Everything; Peyton Place |
| December | 19 | Les Tremayne | 90 | UK | Actor | The War of the Worlds; North by Northwest |
| December | 22 | Rose Hill | 89 | UK | Actress | A Shot in the Dark; House of Whipcord |
| December | 27 | Alan Bates | 69 | UK | Actor | Women in Love; The Fixer |
| December | 29 | Earl Hindman | 61 | US | Actor | Three Men and a Baby; Silverado |
| December | 29 | Bob Monkhouse | 75 | UK | Actor | Thunderbirds Are Go; Carry On Sergeant |
| December | 30 | John Gregory Dunne | 71 | US | Screenwriter | A Star is Born; Up Close and Personal |
| December | 30 | Anita Mui | 40 | Hong Kong | Actress, Singer | Rumble in the Bronx; Drunken Master II |
| December | 30 | Patricia Roc | 88 | UK | Actress | Canyon Passage; The Brothers |
| December | 31 | Peter Donen | 50 | US | Visual Effects Artist | L.A. Confidential; The Bourne Identity |
| December | 31 | Paula Raymond | 79 | US | Actress | Crisis; The Beast from 20,000 Fathoms |

== Film debuts ==
- Jonathan Bennett – Season of Youth
- P.J. Byrne – Bruce Almighty
- Miley Cyrus - Big Fish
- Rob Corddry – Old School
- Benedict Cumberbatch – To Kill a King
- Zac Efron – Melinda's World
- Selena Gomez - Spy Kids 3-D: Game Over
- Matthew Goode – South from Granada
- Ari Graynor – Mystic River
- Vanessa Hudgens – Thirteen
- Josh Hutcherson – American Splendor
- Zoe Kazan – Swordswallowers and Thin Men
- Anna Kendrick – Camp
- Danny McBride – All the Real Girls
- Chris O'Dowd – Conspiracy of Silence
- Ahna O'Reilly – Bill the Intern
- Chris Pratt – The Extreme Team
- Kelly Rowland – Freddy vs. Jason
- Nikki Reed – Thirteen
- Rob Riggle – Pushing Tom
- Britt Robertson – The Ghost Club
- John Robinson – Elephant
- Mike Vogel – Grind
- Kristen Wiig – Melvin Goes to Dinner
