= Matthew Broome =

British actor

- Born: Matthew James Broome; 24 February 2001 (age 25); Bedford, England
- Education: Guildhall School of Music and Drama
- Occupation: Actor
- Years active: 2022–present

Matthew James Broome (born 24 February 2001) is an English actor. He is known for his roles in the Apple TV+ series The Buccaneers (2023–present) and the Amazon Prime film My Fault: London (2025).

== Early life ==
Broome was born in Bedford and grew up in Northampton. He attended Caroline Chisholm School. He was a member of the Northampton Musical Theatre Company's (NMTC) Youth Society and went on to join the National Youth Theatre. Broome is a graduate of the Guildhall School of Music and Drama, earning a Bachelor of Arts (BA) in Acting.

== Career ==
In his third and final year at Guildhall, Broome signed with United Agents and made his professional stage debut as Jack Virtue in Scandaltown at the Lyric Theatre in Hammersmith. The following year, after graduating, he featured in the Shakespeare's Globe productions of The Comedy of Errors as Antipholus of Ephesus and Twelfth Night as Sebastian. For his performance in the former, Broome received praise alongside Michael Elcock, who played Antipholus of Syracuse.

Broome made his television debut when he was cast as Guy Thwarte in the 2023 Apple TV+ period drama The Buccaneers, based on Edith Wharton's novel of the same title. Broome had not yet finished drama school when he first auditioned for the series.

In 2025, he starred opposite Asha Banks in the Amazon Prime film My Fault: London, an English-language version of Culpa mía. He reprised the role in the 2026 sequel, Your Fault: London, and is set to do so for the final time in the unreleased conclusion, Our Fault: London.

== Filmography ==
Year	Title	Role
2023–present	The Buccaneers	Guy Thwarte
2025	My Fault: London	Nick Leister
2026	Your Fault: London	Nick Leister

Year	Title	Role	Notes
2022	Scandaltown	Jack Virtue	Lyric Theatre, London
2023	The Comedy of Errors	Antipholus of Ephesus	Globe Theatre, London
2023	Twelfth Night	Sebastian	Globe Theatre, London
