= Degerfors IF =

Swedish football club

Degerfors
- Full name: Degerfors Idrottsförening
- Nickname: Bruket
- Founded: 13 January 1907; 119 years ago
- Ground: Stora Valla, Degerfors
- Capacity: 6,000
- Chairman: Ulrika Eriksson
- Head coach: Henok Goitom
- League: Allsvenskan
- 2025: 13th
- Website: degerforsif.se
Home colours	Away colours

Degerfors IF is a professional football club located in Degerfors, Sweden. The club was formed on 13 January 1907, and is currently playing in the highest tier in Swedish football, Allsvenskan.

== Fans ==
Being a club in a town with a big iron industry, the club has a lot of politically progressive fans. In their away game versus GAIS on the 13th of April 2025, the away fans displayed a banner saying “ultra rossoblaco - Against Fascism.” And in 2024 they had another banner saying “no style, just working class”.

== Background ==
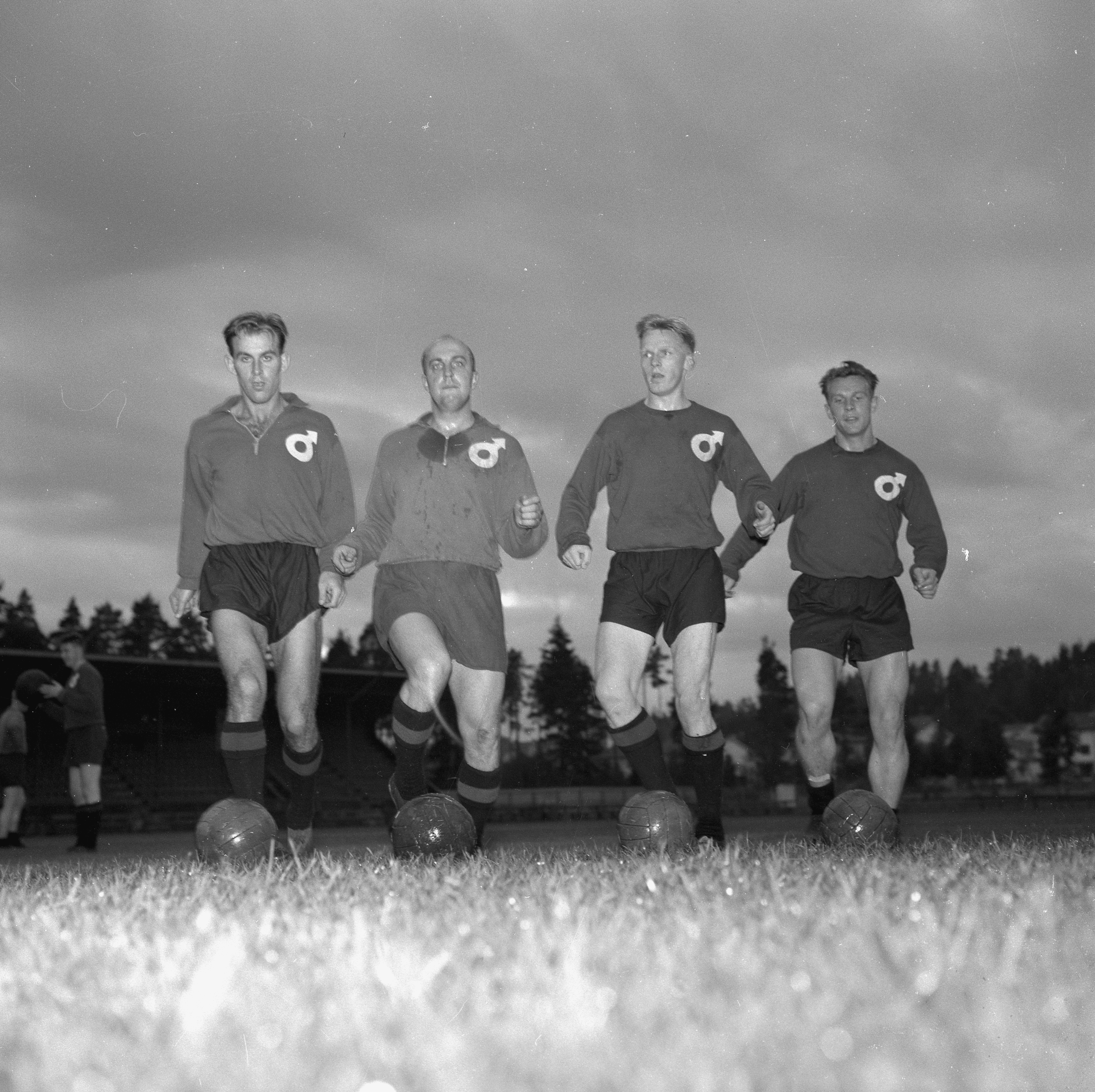
Degerfors players training in 1955.

Degerfors IF first played in the Allsvenskan in 1939, making use of their new home ground at Stora Valla. Up until 1966, the club regularly appeared in the Allsvenskan; however, in recent decades they have played at the highest level for 5 seasons from 1993 to 1997. Their record attendance is 21,065 spectators when Degerfors IF played IFK Norrköping in 1963.

The club is affiliated to the Värmlands Fotbollförbund.

== Season to season ==
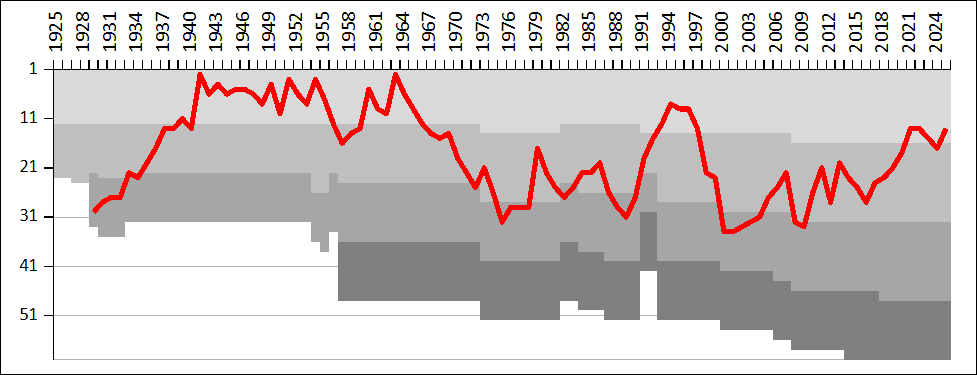
A chart showing the progress of Degerfors IF through the swedish football league system. The different shades of gray represent league divisions.

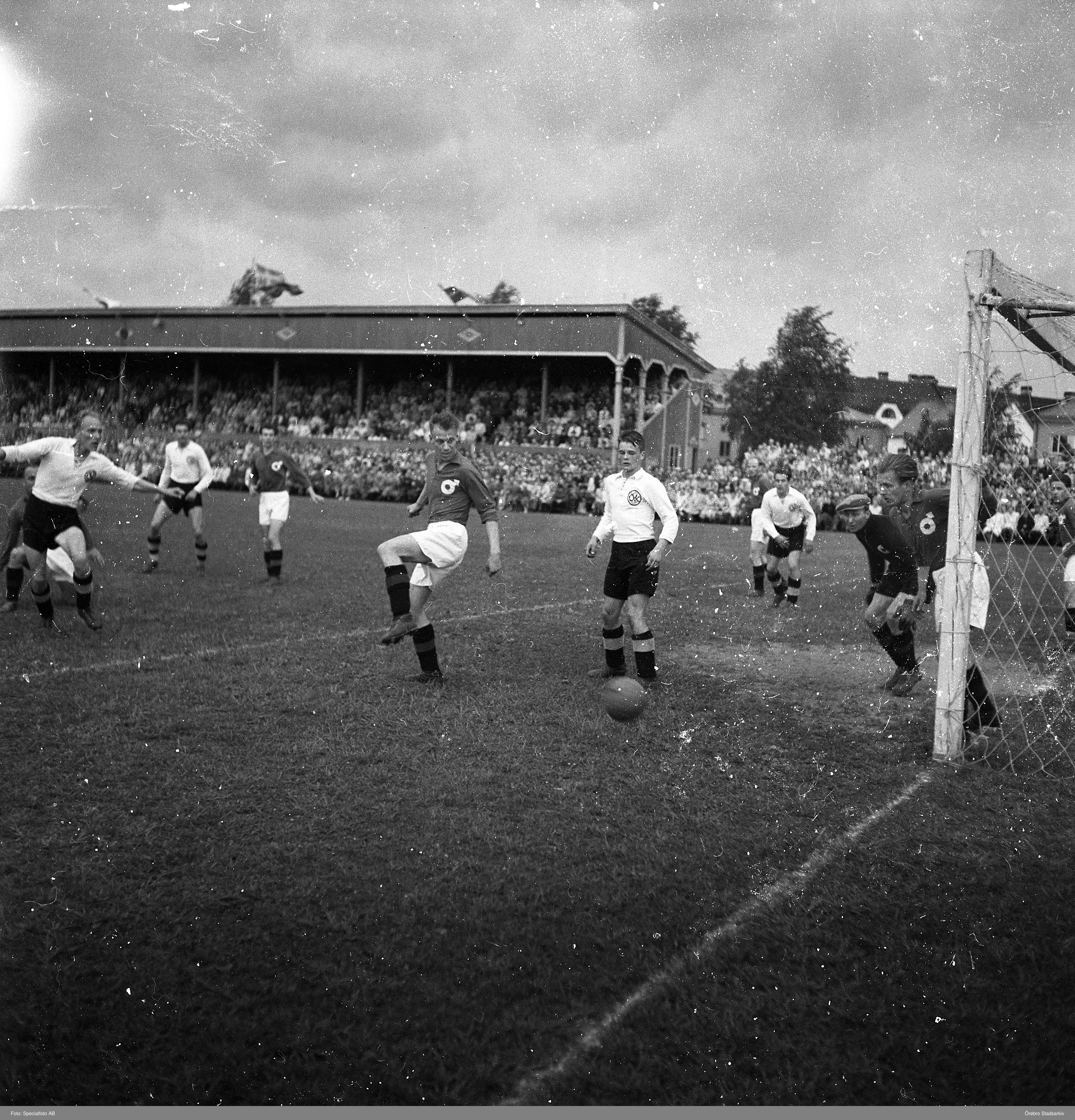
Degerfors playing Örebro SK in the 1948–49 Allsvenskan.

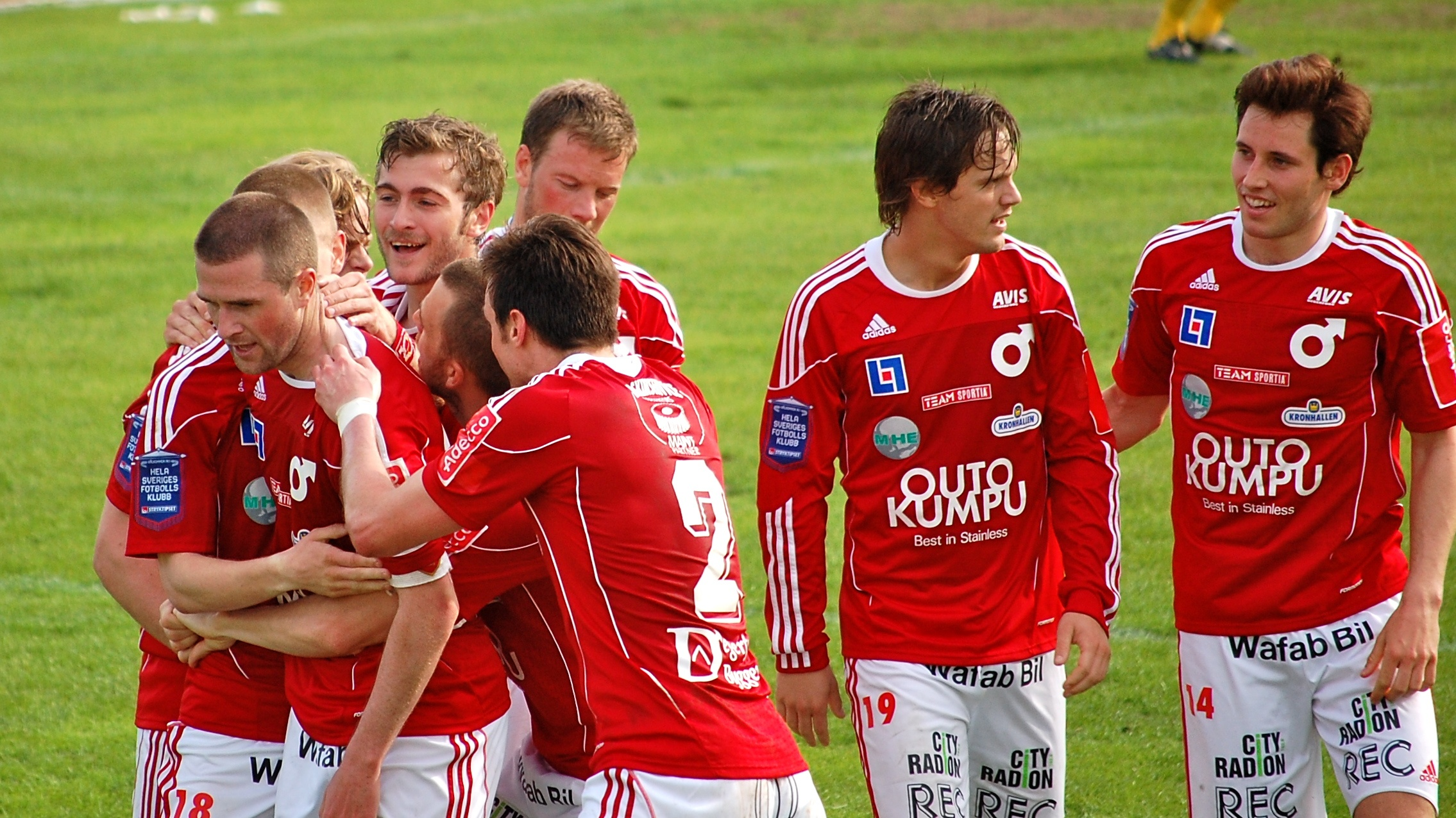
The Degerfors team celebrating a 2010 Superettan goal while wearing their traditional red and white home kit.

Season	Level	Division	Section	Position	Movements
1993	Tier 1	Allsvenskan		12th	
1994	Tier 1	Allsvenskan		8th	
1995	Tier 1	Allsvenskan		9th	
1996	Tier 1	Allsvenskan		9th	
1997	Tier 1	Allsvenskan		13th	Relegated
1998	Tier 2	Division 1	Norra	8th	
1999	Tier 2	Division 1	Norra	9th	Relegated
2000	Tier 3	Division 2	Västra Svealand	4th	
2001	Tier 3	Division 2	Västra Svealand	4th	
2002	Tier 3	Division 2	Västra Svealand	3rd	
2003	Tier 3	Division 2	Västra Svealand	2nd	
2004	Tier 3	Division 2	Västra Svealand	1st	Promoted
2005	Tier 2	Superettan		13th	
2006*	Tier 2	Superettan		11th	
2007	Tier 2	Superettan		8th	
2008	Tier 2	Superettan		16th	Relegated
2009	Tier 3	Division 1	Norra	1st	Promoted
2010	Tier 2	Superettan		10th	
2011	Tier 2	Superettan		5th	
2012	Tier 2	Superettan		12th	
2013	Tier 2	Superettan		4th	
2014	Tier 2	Superettan		7th	
2015	Tier 2	Superettan		9th	
2016	Tier 2	Superettan		12th	
2017	Tier 2	Superettan		8th	
2018	Tier 2	Superettan		7th	
2019	Tier 2	Superettan		5th	
2020	Tier 2	Superettan		2nd	Promoted
2021	Tier 1	Allsvenskan		13th	
2022	Tier 1	Allsvenskan		13th	
2023	Tier 1	Allsvenskan		15th	Relegated
2024	Tier 2	Superettan		1st	Promoted
2025	Tier 1	Allsvenskan		13th	

* League restructuring in 2006 resulted in a new division being created at Tier 3 and subsequent divisions dropping a level.

== Players ==
As of 3 September 2026

Note: Flags indicate national team as defined under FIFA eligibility rules; some limited exceptions apply. Players may hold more than one non-FIFA nationality.

No.	Pos.	Nation	Player
1	GK	SWE	Wille Jakobsson
2	DF	SYR	Ahmad Faqa
3	DF	NOR	Nikolai Skuseth (on loan from Sarpsborg 08)
4	MF	SWE	Kazper Karlsson (on loan from AIK)
5	DF	FIN	Juhani Pikkarainen
6	DF	SWE	Daniel Sundgren (captain)
7	DF	SWE	Sebastian Ohlsson
8	MF	SWE	Bilal Hussein
9	FW	ALG	Karim Boutera
10	FW	SWE	Noel Milleskog (on loan from Sirius)
11	FW	SWE	Dijan Vukojević
13	MF	GHA	Yiriyon Gideon

No.	Pos.	Nation	Player
14	MF	SWE	Ludvig Fritzson
15	DF	GHA	Nasiru Moro
16	MF	SWE	Sebastian Ohlsson
17	FW	DEN	Arman Taranis
18	DF	SEN	Samba Diatara
20	MF	SWE	Elias Barsoum
22	MF	ERI	Nahom Netabay
23	MF	SWE	Robin Dzabic (on loan from Sandefjord)
25	GK	SWE	Liam Karlsson
28	DF	ESP	Jesús Hernández
38	GK	EST	Matvei Igonen

=== Out on loan ===
Note: Flags indicate national team as defined under FIFA eligibility rules; some limited exceptions apply. Players may hold more than one non-FIFA nationality.

No.	Pos.	Nation	Player
19	MF	SWE	Alexander Lindgren (at Nordic United until 30 November 2026)
21	MF	SWE	Alexander Berisson (at Karlslunds IF until 30 November 2026)
23	MF	SWE	Alexander Hedén Lindskog (at FBK Karlstad until 30 November 2026)

No.	Pos.	Nation	Player
24	FW	SWE	Olle Leonardsson (at FC Stockholm until 30 November 2026)
27	FW	GHA	Ziyad Salifu (at Rosengård 1917 until 30 November 2026)

== Staff ==
=== Current technical staff ===
Position	Staff
Manager	(Sweden) William Lundin
Technical Director	(Sweden) Patrik Werner
Goalkeeping Coach	(Sweden) Maria Busk Madland
Team Manager	(Sweden) Stig Ekman

== Managers ==
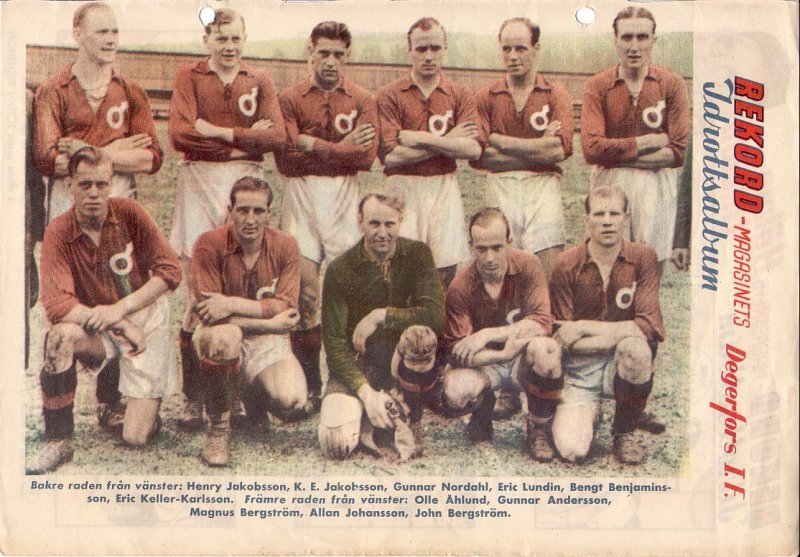
Degerfors 42–43 Allsvenskan squad with Gunnar Nordahl.

- (Sweden) Arnold Andersson-Tagner (1936–37)
- (Hungary) István Wampetits (1937–44)
- (Sweden) Einar Skeppstedt (1945–47)
- (England) Edmund Crawford (1948–49)
- (Sweden) Karl-Erik Jakobsson (1950)
- (Hungary) Imre Markos (1951–53)
- (Sweden) Gunnar Andersson (1953)
- (Austria) Karl Neschy (1954–57)
- (Sweden) Olle Åhlund (1957–59)
- (England) Bill Burnikell (1960–61)
- (Sweden) Tore Karlsson (1961)
- (Sweden) Gunnar Nordahl (1961–64)
- (Hungary) Vilmos Varszegi (1965–66)
- (Sweden) Ernst Bohlin (1961–67)
- (Sweden) Tore Karlsson (1968)
- (Sweden) Åke Klintberg (1969)
- (Sweden) Olle Åhlund (1970)
- (Sweden) Tore Karlsson (1971–72)
- (Sweden) Håkan Höglander (1973–74)
- (Sweden) Curt Edenvik (1975)
- (Sweden) Tord Grip (1976)
- (Sweden) Sven-Göran Eriksson (1977–78)
- (Sweden) Lars-Åke Bäckström (1979–80)
- (Sweden) Peter Pallman (1980)
- (Poland) Janusz Pekowski (1981–82)
- (Scotland) Dave Mosson (1983–85)
- (Sweden) Björn Juhlin (1986–87)
- (Sweden) Lars Henriksson (1988)
- (Sweden) Kenneth Sundkvist (1989)
- (Sweden) Sören Cratz (1990–92)
- (Sweden) Börje Andersson (1993)
- (Sweden) Erik Hamrén (1994)
- (Sweden) Sören Cratz (1995–96)
- (Sweden) Bosse Nilsson (1997)
- (Sweden) Örjan Glans (1998)
- (Sweden) Kenneth Norling (1999–2001)
- (Scotland) Dave Mosson (2002–04)
- (Sweden) Tony Gustavsson (2005–06)
- (Sweden) Mark Selmer (2007)
- (Montenegro) Milenko Vukčević (2007)
- (Sweden) Jan Stahre (2008)
- (Sweden) Patrik Werner (2009–2016)
- (Sweden) Stefan Jacobsson (2016–2019)
- (Sweden) Tobias Solberg and (Sweden) Andreas Holmberg (2020–2023)
- (Sweden) William Lundin (2024–2025)
- (Eritrea) Henok Goitom (2025 - )

== Honours ==
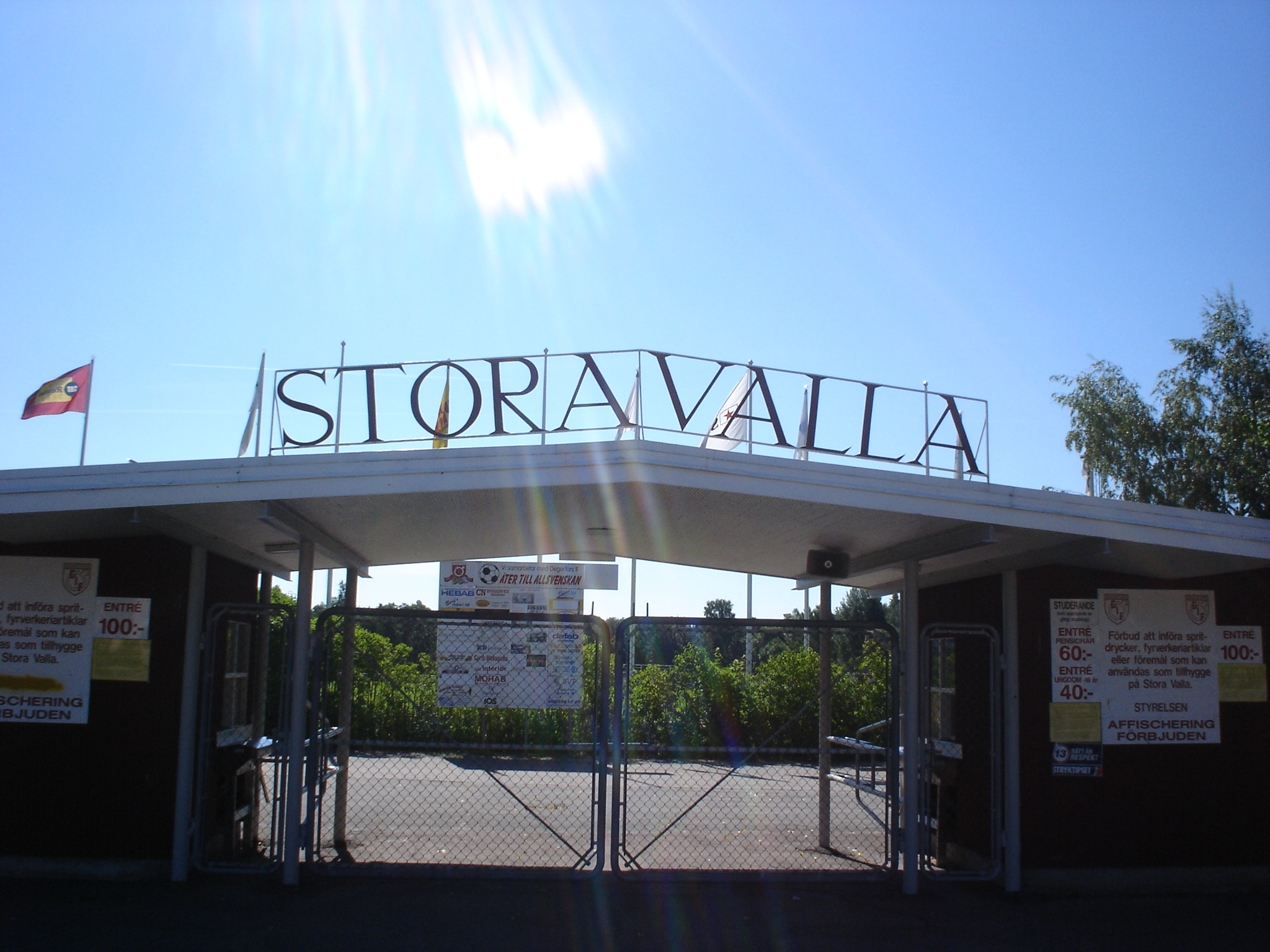
Stora Valla

=== League ===
- Allsvenskan:
  - Runners-up: 1940–41, 1963
- Superettan:
  - Winners: 2024
- Division 1 Norra:
  - Winners: 2009

=== Cups ===
- Svenska Cupen:
  - Winners: 1992–93
