= Your Fault =

Your Fault may refer to:

- Your Fault (Desperate Housewives), an episode of the TV series Desperate Housewives
- Your Fault (film), a 2024 Spanish romantic drama film
- Your Fault, a song by Stephen Sondheim from the musical Into the Woods

== See also ==
- Your Fault: London, an upcoming film sequel to the 2025 film My Fault: London
