= George Manning =

George Manning may refer to:

- George Manning (died 1849), British murderer, the husband and accomplice of Marie Manning
- George Manning (New Zealand politician) (1887–1976), Mayor of Christchurch, New Zealand
- George T. Manning (1908–1956), New York politician

== See also ==
- George Manning McDade (1893–1966), Canadian politician
- Gwyn Manning (1915–2003), Welsh footballer who played at the 1948 Summer Olympics, sometimes mistakenly listed as George Manning
