= Hailaker =

British music project

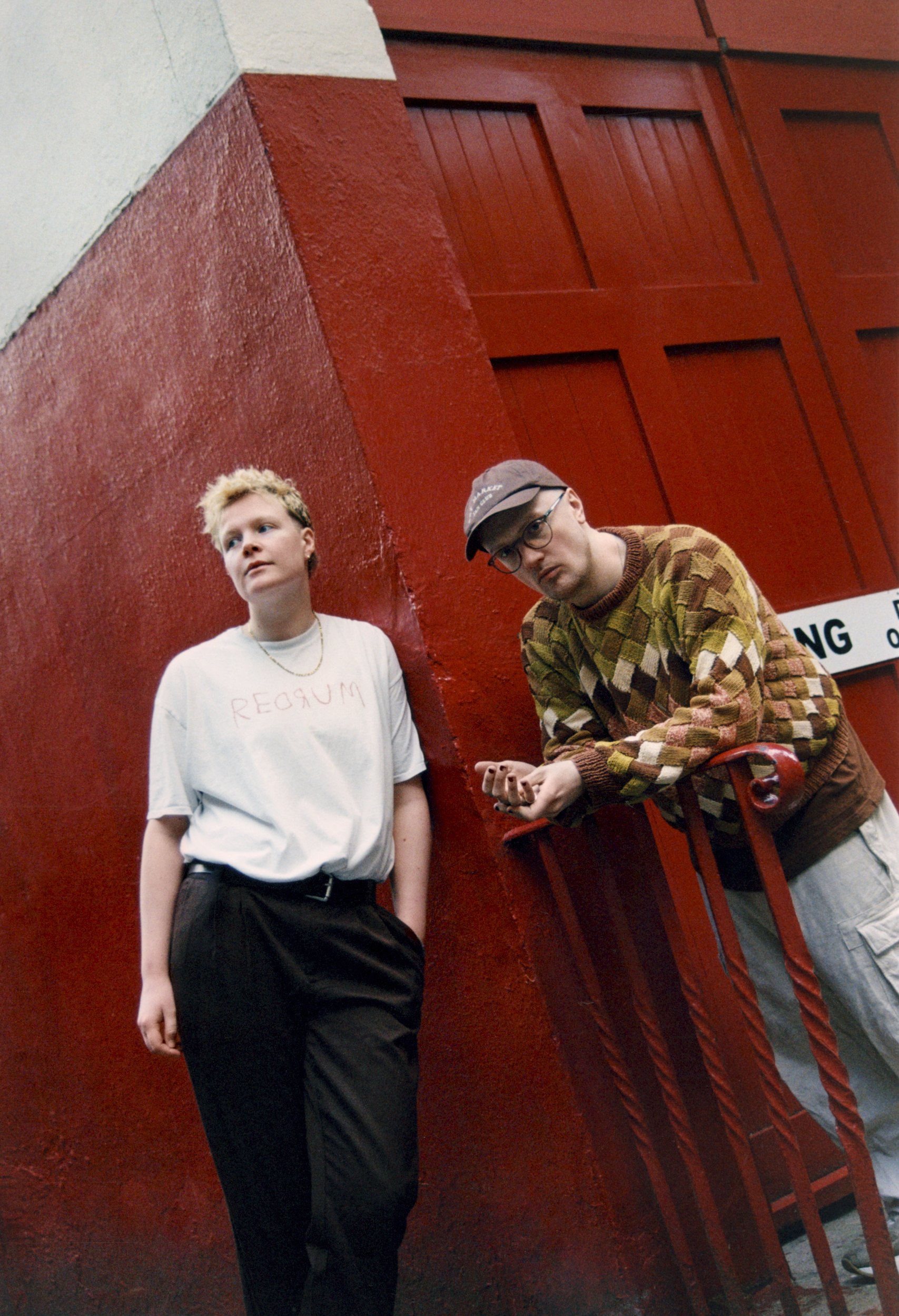
- Ed Tullett and Jemima Coulter

Background information
- Genres: Indie pop; indie folk
- Years active: 2018-present
- Website: hailaker.com

Hailaker (Note: a pseudoword pronounced hay-ull-ache-err) is an indie pop music project of British musicians Jemima Coulter and Ed Tullett, who work between Bristol, Cardiff, and Oxfordshire. They are aided by Portland, Oregon artist Mike Roth who creates artwork, and Ali Lacey (better known as Novo Amor).

According to Coulter, Tullett contacted them in 2016, when they were 18 years old, after he heard their music through a friend. They then drove to his house, and they wrote three songs on the spot, which would later be included in the debut album. The duo debuted with a 2018 double-A single "Rainmaker"/"Earthbound". Their first album, self-titled, was released in 2019, and was followed by the 2020 album Holding. Additionally, they have released music with S. Carey and lilo. As of 2019, they were signed to Lowswimmer, a newly created label run by Lacey, his manager and Tullett. (Note: Tullett later adopted "Lowswimmer" as his solo moniker.) Their third album, Serenity Now, was released on 26 June 2024.

Their music, described also as folktronica, includes ethereal, lo-fi and electronic sounds, employs vocal harmonies, non-standard guitar tunings, and has been compared to Novo Amor, Bon Iver, and Imogen Heap.

== Discography ==
=== Albums ===
Title	Details
Hailaker	Released: 3 May 2019; Label: Lowswimmer Records
Holding	Released: 24 April 2020; Label: Lowswimmer Records
Serenity Now	Released: 26 June 2024; Label: All Points

=== Singles ===
Title	Year	Album
"Coma / Smoke" / "I Could Be Back"	2019	Hailaker
"Not Much"	2019	Hailaker
"Iridesce" / "Famous"	2019	Non-album singles
"Wavepool" (featuring S. Carey)	2021	Non-album singles
"Lorely"	2024	Serenity Now
"Gist"	2024	Serenity Now
"M3"	2024	Serenity Now
"Co-Star"	2024	Serenity Now
"Out Of My Head (I Said What I Said)" (featuring lilo)	2025	Non-album singles
"Sunmouth"	2025	Non-album singles
