= The Magic Flute (2022 film) =

- German theatrical release poster
- Directed by: Florian Sigl
- Screenplay by: Andrew Lowery
- Based on: The Magic Flute by Wolfgang Amadeus Mozart & Emanuel Schikaneder
- Produced by: Roland Emmerich; Christopher Zwickler; Fabian Wolfart
- Starring: Jack Wolfe; Iwan Rheon; Stéfi Celma; Robin Gooch; Sabine Devieilhe; Asha Banks; Morris Robinson; Stefan Konarske
- Cinematography: Peter Matjasko
- Edited by: Alexander Dittner
- Music by: Martin Stock
- Production companies: Flute Film (Christopher Zwickler); Centropolis Entertainment; Tobis Film
- Distributed by: Tobis Film
- Release dates: September 30, 2022 (Zurich); November 17, 2022 (Germany)
- Running time: 124 minutes
- Country: Germany
- Languages: English; German
- Box office: $236,328

The Magic Flute (German: The Magic Flute - Das Vermächtnis der Zauberflöte) is a 2022 German musical fantasy film directed by Florian Sigl and written by Andrew Lowery, partially based on the 1791 opera of the same name by Wolfgang Amadeus Mozart and Emanuel Schikaneder.

== Plot ==
In modern day London, teenager Tim Walker visits his dying father in the hospital. His dad says that after he dies, Tim should follow his dream of going to Mozart International School of Music in Austria. He gives Tim an ornate red German book and asks him to return it to the school.

Tim, who sings and plays piano, begins school. He learns of the school's upcoming auditions for The Magic Flute opera, meets fellow students Sophie and Paolo, and is forced by Headmaster Longbow to sing in front of his classmates with no warning. In the middle of the night, a glowing orb guides Tim to the school library where a large clock resides, under which is a shelf of books with an empty space. Tim inserts the red book and is transported. Three glowing orbs tell him that if he plays the part of Prince Tamino he will get what he desires; if not, he will meet the same fate as this world: engulfed by eternal night. He agrees.

Tim enters the operatic story of the Magic Flute as Prince Tamino, encountering the bird-catcher Papageno, the Queen of Night, and her three ladies. In song, they task him with rescuing the Queen's daughter Pamina from the pagan priest Sarastro. They give him a magic flute and give Papageno a music box of protection.

Tim returns to the real world in possession of the flute. He begins alternating between nights in the story of The Magic Flute and days at school, disappointing his new friends in both by occasionally disappearing to the other. He is forced to choose between art and love, while finding that the most important thing for both is truth.

== Cast ==
- Jack Wolfe as Tim Walker / Prince Tamino
- Iwan Rheon as Papageno
- Stéfi Celma as Papagena
- Robin Gooch as Old Papagena
- Sabine Devieilhe as The Queen of The Night
- Asha Banks as Princess Pamina of The Night
- Morris Robinson as Sarastro The Sorcerer
- Stefan Konarske as Monostatos
- Larissa Herden as Lady Hazel
- Jasmin Shakeri as Lady Scarlet
- Jeanne Goursaud as Lady Azure
- Greg Wise as James Walker
- Luyanda Unati Lewis-Nyawo as Nurse
- F. Murray Abraham as Dr. Longbow
- Niamh McCormack as Sophie
- Elliot Courtiour as Paolo Tocci
- Cosima Henman as Olivia
- Amir Wilson as Anton Milanesi
- Rolando Villazón as Enrico Milanesi
- Tedros "Teddy" Teclebrhan as Mr. Baumgartner
- Waldemar Kobus as Mr. Suessmayr

== Production ==
=== Development ===
In 2017, Roland Emmerich's Centropolis Entertainment and Flimmer began to co-produce a modern-day adaptation of Mozart's opera, the brainchild of Florian Sigl and Christopher Zwickler. Emmerich and Zwickler produced, Sigl directed, while Andrew Lowery wrote the screenplay. Dan Maag and Fabian Wolfart of Pantaleon Films joined as producers at the 68th Berlin International Film Festival in February 2018.

Pixomondo created the film's VFX. The project received funds from both Austria and Germany.

Co-producers include Tim Oberwelland, Theodor Gringel, Peter Eiff and Tobias Alexander Seiffert of Tobis Film as well as Stefan Konarske of Quinta Media.

=== Casting ===
The cast was announced in February 2021, with Iwan Rheon, Jack Wolfe, Asha Banks and Amir Wilson starring. Opera stars Sabine Devieilhe, Rolando Villazón and Morris Robinson would feature. Other cast members include F. Murray Abraham, Stéfi Celma, Jeanne Goursaud, Jasmin Shakeri, Lary, and Stefan Konarske.

=== Filming ===
Principal photography began in February 2021 at Bavaria Studios in Munich and wrapped in Tenerife in April. Other reported filming locations included Salzburg and London.

=== Music ===
Seventeen arias from The Magic Flute are featured in the film, performed by the individual actors.

- "Have Mercy"
- "Observe His Face"
- "I'm Sure That There Could Never Be"
- "Such Loveliness"
- "You, You, You"
- "Hm, Hm, Hm"
- "You Will Not Dare"
- "What Place Is This?"
- "A Man in Search"
- "Two Little Birds"
- "This Music"
- "Long Live to Sarastro"
- "All the World Is Always Lasting"
- "The Wrath of Hell"
- "Before Our Holy Altar"
- "Now I Know"
- "Pa Pa Papagena"

Three non opera songs are also included.

- "I'll Be There" (Jackson 5): The original track is heard early in the film, then is played on piano and sung by Tim and Sophie.
- "Time to Say Goodbye": Tim performs this as part of his introduction to the school.
- "Outweigh Your Love": Performed during the end credits by Madeleine and Wankelmut.

== Release ==
Sola Media has the rights to international distribution. First look stills were revealed in October 2021. The film premiered at the 2022 Zurich Film Festival. It received a theatrical release on 10 March 2023 through Shout! Studios.

== Reception ==
The film received mixed reviews. Review aggregator website Rotten Tomatoes reports a 50% score, based on 18 reviews, with an average rating of 5.4/10.
