= My Fault: London =

2025 romantic drama film

- Release poster
- Directed by: Dani Girdwood; Charlotte Fassler
- Written by: Melissa Osborne
- Based on: Culpa mía by Mercedes Ron
- Produced by: Ben Pugh; Erica Steinberg
- Starring: Asha Banks; Matthew Broome; Eve Macklin; Ray Fearon; Sam Buchanan; Jason Flemyng
- Cinematography: Ed Moore
- Edited by: Robert Frost
- Music by: James Jacob
- Production companies: Ingenious Media; 42
- Distributed by: Amazon MGM Studios
- Release date: February 13, 2025
- Running time: 119 minutes
- Country: United Kingdom
- Language: English

My Fault: London is a 2025 British romantic drama film directed by Dani Girdwood and Charlotte Fassler, and written by Melissa Osborne. It stars Asha Banks, Matthew Broome, Eve Macklin, Ray Fearon, Sam Buchanan, and Jason Flemyng. The film is a remake of the 2023 Spanish film, My Fault, which is based on the novel Culpa mía by Mercedes Ron.

It was released on Amazon Prime Video on 13 February 2025.

== Plot ==
18-year-old Noah moves from Florida to London with her mother Ella, who has married wealthy businessman William. In their new home, Noah meets William’s son Nick, a rebellious but successful young man. The two clash immediately and agree to stay away from each other.

At a family event, Noah discovers Nick is not just a spoiled rich kid—he built his own wealth through an app. Later, after an argument, he abandons her on the roadside, but sends his valet to retrieve her. Instead, Noah has him take her to Nick’s party, where she witnesses his reckless lifestyle. When she unknowingly drinks a spiked drink, Nick saves her and violently confronts the man responsible, revealing a darker side to him. He also notices Noah has a figure-eight knot tattoo, hinting at her troubled past.

Noah’s life becomes more complicated when she learns her boyfriend Dan cheated on her with her best friend Haley. In her anger, she forces Nick to take her to a racing event he attends. There, Noah surprises everyone by proving she has strong driving skills, taught to her by her father. Nick offers to help her get revenge by staging a photo of them kissing. Their plan works, but the fake kiss quickly turns real as their attraction grows.

Nick becomes involved in a dangerous race and fight deal with violent ex-con Ronnie. When Noah takes Nick’s place in the race, she wins, but Ronnie is furious, leading to a brutal fight. She has a panic attack, revealing she has trauma connected to violence, darkness, and confined spaces—stemming from abuse by her father.

As Nick and Noah grow closer, Noah learns more about Nick’s family: his mother is a recovered alcoholic, and his sister Maddie is only accessible to him if he avoids violence. Despite their efforts to stay away from trouble, their bond deepens and they eventually become intimate. Meanwhile, Dan arrives in London unexpectedly, but Noah rejects him and chooses Nick.

Ronnie’s threats escalate. Noah and Nick travel to Ibiza for Nick’s birthday, but his violent instincts surface again, pushing Noah away. Back in London, Nick’s ex, Anna, and her friends trap Noah in a cupboard, triggering a severe panic attack and traumatic flashbacks. Nick rescues and comforts her, and she finally opens up about her father’s attempt to kill her.

Soon, Nick’s best friend Lion is attacked, and a detective investigation reveals that Ronnie is working with Noah’s father, who has been released from prison and is hunting Noah down. She is kidnapped by the two, who demand a million-dollar ransom. Nick tracks them down using the GPS from his car, that Ronnie stole.

A violent confrontation breaks out, and Nick is stabbed, but he refuses to stop fighting for Noah. She is forced to flee at gunpoint with her father, leading to a dangerous car chase. Nick deliberately crashes his car to stop them, injuring himself further. The police arrive, and Noah escapes, rushing to Nick as he collapses unconscious.

Six weeks later, both recover and remain together. Although their parents suspect something romantic between them, they dismiss it. The story ends with Noah and Nick sharing a romantic kiss underwater, confirming their relationship.

== Cast ==
- Asha Banks as Noah Morgan
- Matthew Broome as Nick Leister
- Eve Macklin as Ella
- Ray Fearon as William Leister
- Enva Lewis as Jenna
- Kerim Hassan as Lion
- Sam Buchanan as Ronnie
- Amelia Kenworthy as Anna
- Christina Cole as Bethan
- Jason Flemyng as Travis
- Harry Gilby as Dan
- George Robinson as JP

== Production ==
The film is an adaptation of the first book in Argentine-born Spanish author Mercedes Ron's Culpables trilogy. It is directed by Dani Girdwood and Charlotte Fassler. The script has been written by Melissa Osborne. The film is produced by Ben Pugh and Erica Steinberg from 42.

It stars Asha Banks and Matthew Broome and also includes Ray Fearon, Jason Flemyng, Eve Macklin, Enva Lewis, Kerim Hassan, Sam Buchanan, Amelia Kenworthy, and Harry Gilby.

Principal photography had wrapped by May 2024.

== Release ==
My Fault: London was released by Amazon MGM Studios through their Prime Video service on 13 February 2025.

== Sequels ==
Sequels Your Fault: London and Our Fault: London were commissioned in 2025. Filming began in London in June 2025 on Your Fault: London.
