= Asha Banks =

English actress

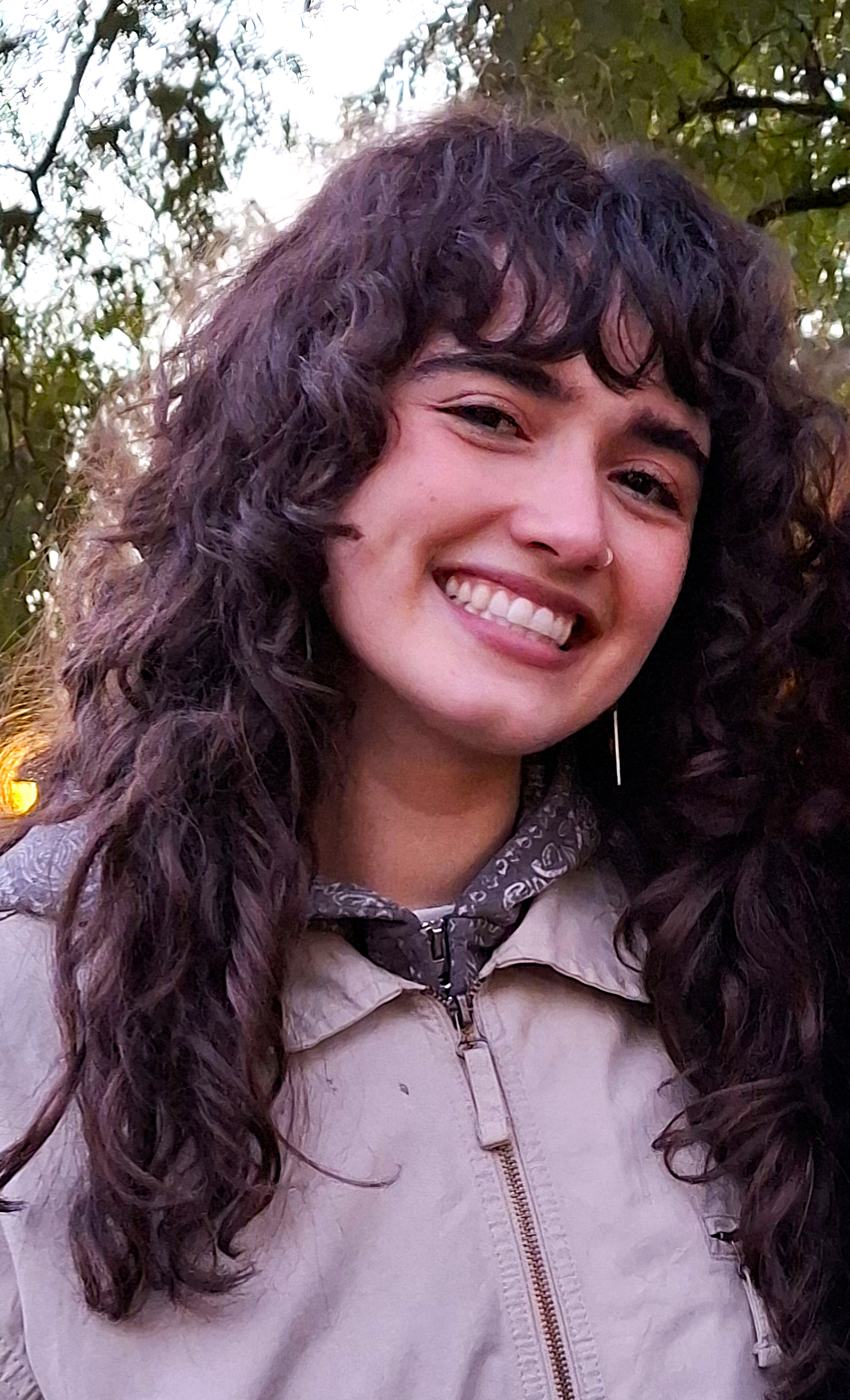
- Asha Banks in 2026
- Born: Asha Alice Banks; 26 November 2003 (age 22); St Albans, Hertfordshire, England
- Occupations: Actress; singer
- Years active: 2011–present
- Musical career
- Genre: Pop
- Instruments: Vocals; guitar
- Label: Island

Asha Alice Banks (born 26 November 2003) is an English actress and musician. She began her career as a child actress in the West End. Her films include The Magic Flute (2022), My Fault: London (2025) and Your Fault: London (2026). On television, she is known for her roles in the CBBC series Rebel Cheer Squad (2022) and the BBC Three series A Good Girl's Guide to Murder (2024–present). She has released two EPs, "Untie My Tongue", "How Real Was It?" and "Bottled Up" in March 2025, November 2025 and October 2026, respectively.

== Early life ==
Banks was born in St Albans, Hertfordshire to parents Sophie and Duncan. She has an older brother. Banks attended the local Abbey Primary School and then Parmiter's School in Garston. She then attended Elstree Screen Arts for sixth form, studying Musical Theatre and Music Performance She took Saturday drama classes at Top Hat Stage School and participated in Michael Xavier's MX Masterclass on Sundays, of which she is now a patron.

== Career ==
Banks made her television debut in 2011 with minor roles in EastEnders and Call the Midwife, both on BBC One. Banks was seven or eight when she was cast as young Éponine in the long-running musical Les Misérables at the Queen's Theatre in 2012, marking Banks' West End debut. She appeared in the 2014 Almeida and Playhouse Theatre runs of the play 1984.

Banks went on the 2015 UK tour of Annie, playing the eldest orphan Duffy. She joined the West End production of Charlie and the Chocolate Factory at the Theatre Royal, Drury Lane as Violet Beauregarde before its closure in 2017. She alternated the roles Pandora Braithwaite in the 2017 off-West End production of The Secret Diary of Adrian Mole Aged 13¾ at the Menier Chocolate Factory and Lisa James in The Boy in the Dress at the Royal Shakespeare Theatre in Stratford-upon-Avon in 2019.

In 2021, Banks played Thea in the London revival of Spring Awakening at the Almeida Theatre. She was also the understudy for Amara Okereke's Wendla. Banks was cast in as Princess Pamina in the German musical film The Magic Flute, marking Banks' feature film debut. The film premiered at the 2022 Zurich Film Festival and had a wide release in 2023. Banks also returned to television in 2022 with a recurring role as Brooke in the BBC iPlayer teen drama Rebel Cheer Squad, a Get Even spinoff.

Banks has played the character Cara Ward in the BBC Three adaptation of A Good Girl's Guide to Murder and starred opposite Matthew Broome in the Amazon Prime film My Fault: London, an English-language version of the Spanish film Culpa mía. She then released her debut EP Untie My Tongue and her second single "Feel the Rush" was featured in the credits of My Fault: London. Her single "Come Down" released prior to, and appeared in the credits of, the sequel film, Your Fault: London.

== Music ==
Banks started writing songs as early as six years old with music always being close to her as she ventured into other projects. She remembered a turning point in her music career after learning how to play the guitar at her local pub where she used to sing songs she loved, having never really learned music theory.

On November 1, 2024, Banks released her first single "So Green". The single, "Feel the Rush", included in the credits of My Fault: London preceded the release of her debut EP, "Untie My Tongue" on 7 March 2025. The EP included four more songs, and was supported by a release show in London the following day, as well as two performances in Omeara, London, on 3 and 4 April. This was followed by the release of a collaborative remix of Holly Humberstone's "Dive", on 25 July, with a live performance in Hyde Park on 6 July.

Banks released the first single, "Rerun", of her second EP, on 15 August 2025. The second single, "Mascara Tears", released on 3 October, was preceded by an American tour announcement, with shows in California, Chicago, New York, and Toronto, as well as a European tour with dates including Stockholm, Berlin, Brussels, Paris, and London. Her second EP, "How Real Was It?" was then released on November 14, 2025, which included the two singles and a further six tracks. Banks embarked on the North American tour in December 2025, and the European tour in March 2026.

Banks went on to release three collaborative songs, compiled under the title "Everything is About You", with Novo Amor and Lowswimmer on 24 April 2026. Her following single, "Too Busy Missing You", was released in conjunction with the Prime series Off Campus, in which it appeared, on 13 May. Her following single, "Come Down", released on 12 June, five days before the Your Fault: London film in which it appeared.

Banks released the first single from her new EP, titled "Biggest Fan", on 31 July 2026. This was followed by "Anything But" on 11 September, and the announcement of her third EP, titled "Bottled Up", which released on 2 October 2026 with a further three songs.

== Filmography ==
Year	Title	Role	Notes
2011	EastEnders	Various	4 episodes
2011	Call the Midwife	Spanish Girl	1 episode
2012	Confus[(ion) (ed)]	Sister	Short films
2014	Blue	Jessica	Short films
2022	Rebel Cheer Squad	Brooke	5 episodes
2022	The Magic Flute	Princess Pamina	
2024–present	A Good Girl's Guide to Murder	Cara Ward	10 episodes
2025	My Fault: London	Noah Morgan	Amazon Prime Video
2026	Your Fault: London	Noah Morgan	Amazon Prime Video

== Stage ==
Year	Title	Role	Notes
2012	Les Misérables	Young Eponine	Queen's Theatre, London
2014	1984	Parsons Child	Almeida Theatre / Playhouse Theatre, London
2015	Annie	Duffy	UK tour
2016–2017	Charlie and the Chocolate Factory	Violet Beauregarde	Theatre Royal, Drury Lane
2017	The Secret Diary of Adrian Mole Aged 13¾	Pandora Braithwaite	Menier Chocolate Factory, London
2019	The Boy in the Dress	Lisa James	Royal Shakespeare Theatre, Stratford-upon-Avon
2021	Spring Awakening	Thea / understudy Wendla	Almeida Theatre, London

== Discography ==
=== Extended plays ===
List of extended plays, with select details
Title	Details
Untie My Tongue	Released 7 March 2025; Label: Independent; Format: Digital download, streaming
How Real Was It?	Released: 14 November 2025; Label: Island Records; Format: Digital download, streaming, vinyl
Bottled Up	Released: 2 October 2026; Label: Island Records; Format: Digital download, streaming

=== Singles ===
List of singles, showing year released and associated album/EP
Title	Year	Album / EP
"So Green"	2024	Untie My Tongue
"Feel the Rush"	2024	Untie My Tongue
"Dive" (duet version with Holly Humberstone)	2025	Non-album singles
"Rerun"	2025	How Real Was It?
"Mascara Tears"	2025	How Real Was It?
"Anymore" (with Novo Amor & Lowswimmer)	2026	Non-album singles
"Lie For Me" (with Novo Amor & Lowswimmer)	2026	Non-album singles
"Hear Me Out" (with Novo Amor & Lowswimmer)	2026	Non-album singles
"Too Busy Missing You"	2026	Off Campus: The Mixtape
"Come Down"	2026	Off Campus: The Mixtape
"Biggest Fan"	2026	Bottled Up
"Anything But"	2026	Bottled Up
