= Stefan Konarske =

German film, television and stage actor (born 1980)

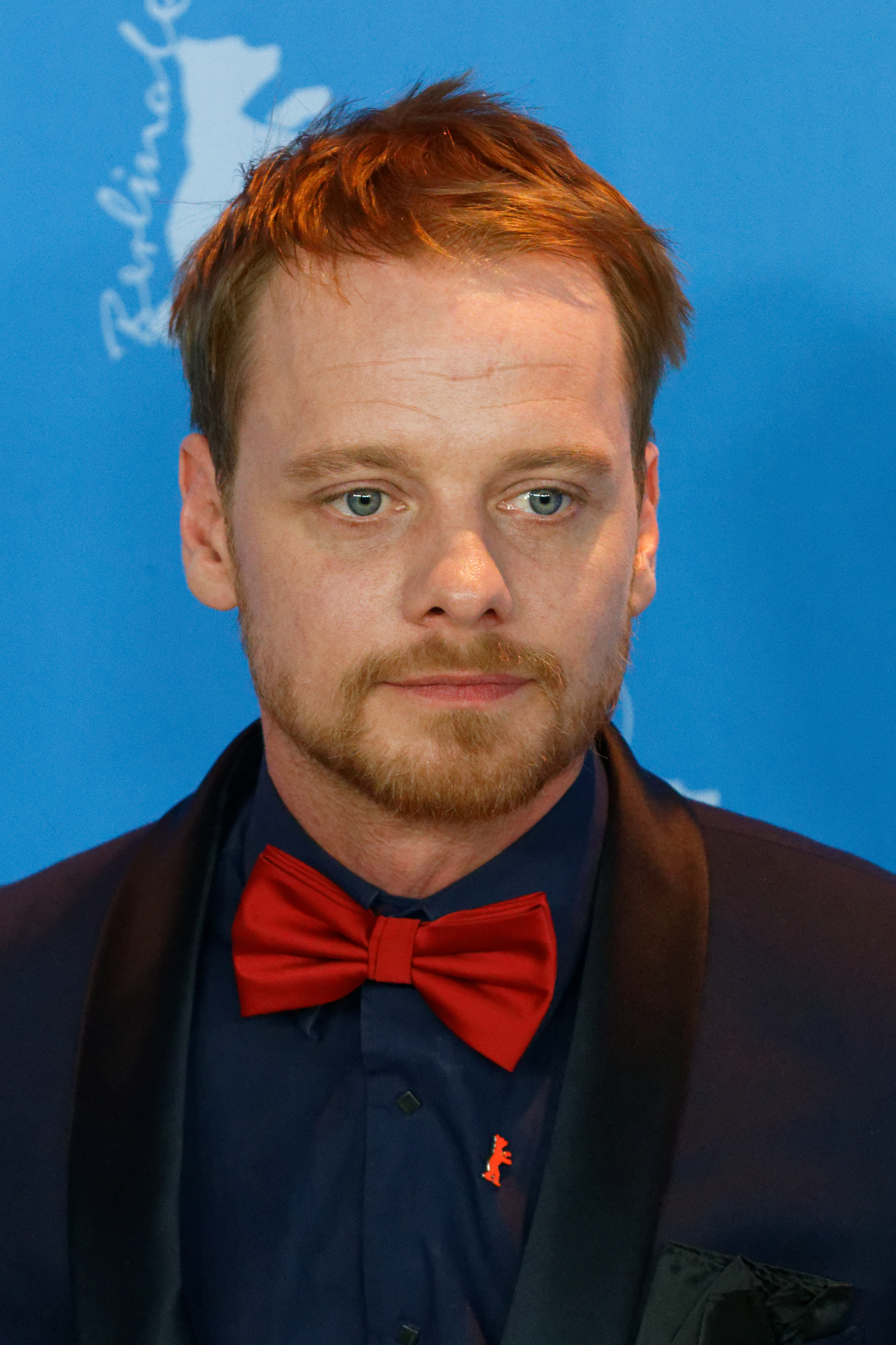
- Stefan Konarske (2017)
- Born: 28 February 1980 (age 46); Stade, West Germany
- Occupations: Film, television and stage actor
- Years active: 2004–present

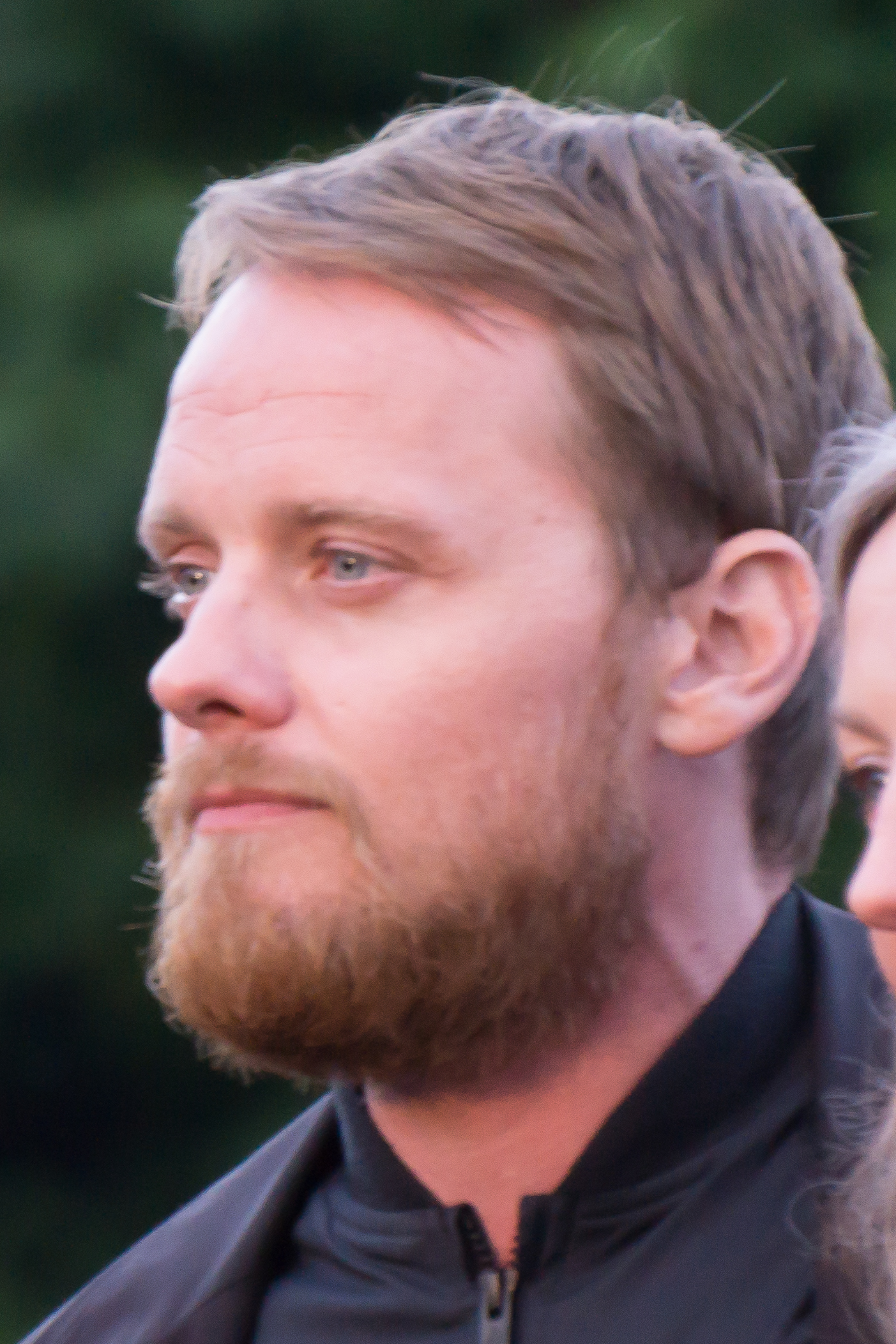
Stefan Konarske as Daniel Kossik in Tatort

Stefan Konarske (born 28 February 1980) is a German film, television and stage actor.

== Biography ==
Konarske studied in Paris before returning to Germany where he had his start as a young actor in a private Hamburg theatre company. He then studied at Ernst Busch Academy of Dramatic Arts graduating in 2006 with distinction after four years of studies. While studying, he played the title role in a production of Bertolt Brecht's Baal. In the 2006-2007 season, he also made his debut at the Deutsches Theater in the role of Orest in Drei Sterne suchen einen Koch directed by Michael Thalheimer. For this role he was named "Young Actor of the Year 2007" by the magazine Theater. He then appeared as part of the Ensemble of the Deutsche Theater Berlin, in the 2008 TV adaptation of the theatre piece Werther in the lead role. It was broadcast on ZDF theater channel. For his role, he was nominated as "Best Young Actor - Television Movie" during the Undine Awards in Austria.

Konarske has appeared in a number of films, shorts, TV series and stage acts, most notably between 2012 and 2017 as Daniel Kossik, in the German long-running police series Tatort, and in films like Valerian and the City of a Thousand Planets and as Friedrich Engels in the 2017 film The Young Karl Marx.

== Filmography ==
Films

- 2009: Same Same but Different as Ed
- 2017: Valerian and the City of a Thousand Planets as Captain Zito
- 2017: The Young Karl Marx as Friedrich Engels
- 2018: My Brother's Name Is Robert and He Is an Idiot
- 2022: The Magic Flute

TV series

- 2006-2011: Tatort in various roles as Martin Jansen, Daniel Bergmann, Tim Krabbert and Micha (TV series)
- 2008: Was ihr wollt as Viola (TV film)
- 2008: KDD – Kriminaldauerdienst as Ansgar Reiter (TV series)
- 2012–2017: Tatort as Daniel Kossik (TV series)
- 2018-2022: Das Boot as Ulrich Wrangel (TV series)
- 2020: Freud as Crown Prince Rudolf (TV series)
