= Jemima Coulter =

British musician

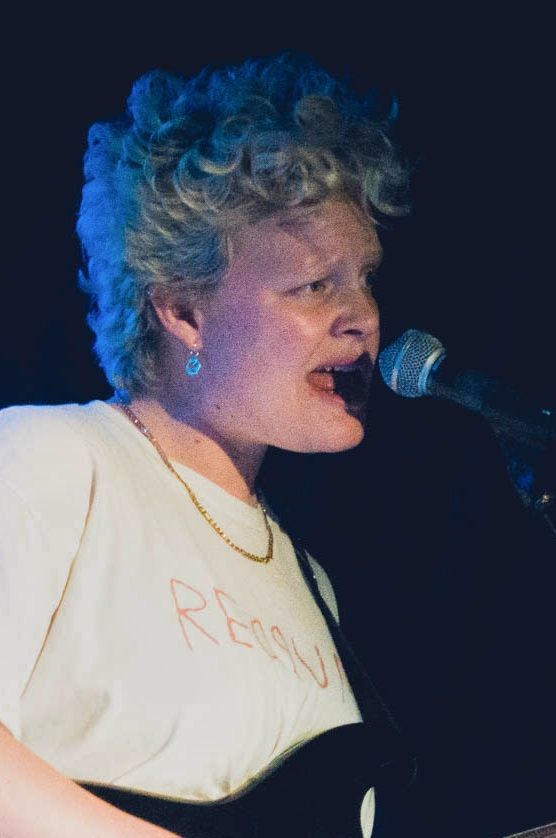
- Coulter in 2022

Background information
- Origin: Bristol, England
- Occupations: Musician; songwriter
- Member of: Hailaker

Jemima Coulter is a British musician, singer, and songwriter. They are one half of the duo Hailaker with Ed Tullett, and released the solo album Grace After a Party in 2022.

== Career ==
Hailaker, the duo formed by Coulter and Tullett, debuted in 2018 with the double single "Rainmaker"/"Earthbound". The project later released the albums Hailaker (2019), Holding (2020), and Serenity Now (2024). On Holding, Coulter was credited as a main artist, composer and lyricist alongside Hailaker, Lowswimmer and Ed Tullett. In 2021, Hailaker released "Wavepool", a collaboration with S. Carey. Coulter began releasing solo music in 2022. Their single "SST" preceded the album Grace After a Party, issued by Hand in Hive later that year.

== Reception ==
Reviews in Loud and Quiet and PopMatters described Grace After a Party as Coulter's debut solo LP. PopMatters called it a confident debut that balances experimental and accessible elements, while Loud and Quiet praised the ambition of Coulter's songwriting, describing parts of it as verging on "derivative" but concluding that "what comes next is bound to be even more accomplished."

== Personal life ==
Coulter grew up in Hampshire, England, and is based in Bristol. Coulter's official website refers to them with they/them pronouns.

== Discography ==
=== Solo ===
Title	Details
Grace After a Party	Released: 2022; Label: Hand in Hive

=== Hailaker ===
From the full Hailaker discography

Title	Details
Hailaker	Released: 3 May 2019
Holding	Released: 24 April 2020
Serenity Now	Released: 26 June 2024
