= Pavlos Lespouridis =

Greek weightlifter (1958–2003)

Personal information
- Nationality: Greek
- Born: 2 November 1958
- Died: 26 February 2003 (aged 44); Highway between Edessa and Florina, Greece

Sport
- Sport: Weightlifting

Pavlos Lespouridis (2 November 1958 – 26 February 2003) was a Greek weightlifter and coach. He competed at the 1980 Summer Olympics and the 1984 Summer Olympics. In 1987 he was 7th in the European Championships. Moreover, he won medals in the Mediterranean Games as he came 2nd in 1987 and 3rd in 1979. Later he became a coach. He was killed in a car crash in the highway between the districts of Edessa and Florina, in Macedonia, Greece, on 26 February 2003. He was 44 years old, was buried in Florina and at the time of his death served at the Greek Police Physical Education Department. His son, Theocharis, was a Boys' champion in 1999.
