= List of Marathi films of 2003 =

A list of films produced by the Marathi language film industry based in Maharashtra in the year 2003.

== 2003 Releases ==
A list of Marathi films released in 2003.

Year	Film	Director	Cast	Producer	Notes	Source
2003	Not Only Mrs. Raut	Gajendra Ahire	Tushar Dalvi, Aditi Deshpande, Vikram Gokhale	My Group	National Film Award for Best Feature Film in Marathi in 2003	
2003	Shodh	Pradeep Berlekar	Laxmikant Berde, Ravindra Berde, Ramesh Bhatkar	Midas Touch, Pawan Films		
2003	Vitthal Vitthal	Gajendra Ahire				
2003	Gharandaaj	Manohar Sakhankar	Anit Shingtey, Guru Thakur, Milind Gogate, Preeti Joshi			
2003	Shevatcha Purava	S. Vijaykumar	Anand Abhyankar, Pankaj Vishnu, Uday Sabnis, Aadesh Bandekar	V. V. Sanyashiv		
2003	Saglikade Bombabomb	Avinash Thakur	Ashok Saraf, Varsha Usgaonkar, Prashant Damle, Kishori Shahane			
2003	Vishwaas		Mrinal Kulkarni, Aadesh Bandekar, Reema Lagoo, Satish Pulekar			
2003	Aadharstambh	Rajesh Chauhan	Vikram Gokhale, Neena Kulkarni			
2003	Aai	Mahesh Manjrekar	Sunil Barve, Arun Badshandey, Nana Dalvi			
2003	Bagh Haat Dakhavun	Vishal Bahandari	Ramesh Medhekar, Viju Khote			
2003	Chimani Pakhare	Mahesh Kothare	Sachin Khedekar, Padmini Kolhapure			
2003	Deva Shappath Khote Sagen Khare Saganar Nahi	Sanjay Kolate	Vijay Chavan, Ashok Saraf, Priya Arun			
