= Elliott Marks =

Canadian photographer

- Born: 3 December 1941
- Died: 9 July 2003 (aged 61)
- Known for: movie stills photographer
- Notable work: Pirates of the Caribbean; The Horse Whisperer; Clueless; Down and Out in Beverly Hills; Annie; Rocky
- Awards: posthumously awarded the first Still Photographer Award by the International Cinematographers Guild Publicists Awards in 2004

Elliott Marks (3 December 1941 – 9 July 2003) was a Canadian movie stills photographer who was Posthumously awarded the first Still Photographer Award by the International Cinematographers Guild Publicists Awards in 2004. According to the award citation: "Marks devoted 25 years of his life to capturing some of the best images from an array of classic Hollywood films. His credits include Pirates of the Caribbean, The Horse Whisperer, Clueless, Down and Out in Beverly Hills, Annie and Rocky.

Elliott Stephen Marks was born in Toronto, Ontario, in 1941. After a career as a wildlife photographer he gained his first screen credit as the still photographer for Jonathan Livingston Seagull in 1973. In 1996, Marks was inducted as a founding member of the Society of Motion Picture Still Photographers. He was the recipient of the Society of Operating Cameramen's Lifetime Achievement Award.

Marks was married to Deborah Klar. He also fathered a son, Harrison, by his first wife Andie.

The movie Starsky & Hutch was dedicated to Marks.
