= Anil Nandy =

Indian footballer

Personal information
- Date of birth: 1923
- Place of birth: Calcutta, British India
- Date of death: 14 February 2003
- Place of death: Kolkata, West Bengal, India

Senior career*
Years	Team	Apps	(Gls)
- Eastern Railway FC

International career
1938–1948	India	4	(0)
- * Club domestic league appearances and goals

Anil Nandy (1923 – 14 February 2003) was a former Indian football player. He was part of the team that played for India at the 1948 Summer Olympics. He with his brothers Nikhil Nandy and Santosh Nandy are the only three brothers to have played for India.

Nandy made his debut for India in the international tour to Australia against the Australian football team in 1938.

== Honours ==
- Santosh Trophy: 1947–48
