= Your Fault: London =

2026 romantic drama film

- Promotional poster
- Directed by: Dani Girdwood; Charlotte Fassler
- Based on: Culpa tuya by Mercedes Ron
- Starring: Asha Banks; Matthew Broome
- Production company: 42
- Distributed by: Amazon MGM Studios
- Release date: June 17, 2026
- Country: United Kingdom
- Language: English

Your Fault: London is a 2026 British romantic drama film. The film is a follow-up to 2025 film My Fault: London. Dani Girdwood and Charlotte Fassler return as directors and lead actors Asha Banks and Matthew Broome reprise their roles. It was digitally released on Amazon Prime Video on 17 June 2026.

== Plot ==
Nick and Noah race in their cars through the countryside, ending up at the country home of William Leister. There, Noah finds a surprise birthday party for her 19th, which is combined with celebrations for her upcoming enrolment to an Aerospace Engineering course at Oxford University. Lion tells Nick that he plans to propose to Jenna, but that he must first raise the funds to keep his gym in Brixton via an illegal racing match. Nick helps him by agreeing to race for him.

Noah settles into Oxford, meeting her housemate Briar, who has unclear prior connections to Nick which Noah does not know about. In her first class, Noah is called on, and exchanges facts with a fellow student, second year Michael, who later tricks her into providing him with her phone number.

Noah attends the launch of the new partnership between Leister Enterprises and a safety technology company, AiTKEN, owned by Sophia. Noah is jealous of Sophia's closeness with Nick, which her mother Ella notices. Ella then confronts her daughter, who admits to being in a relationship with Nick; Ella orders Noah to end the relationship as soon as possible.

Nick continues to visit Noah occasionally at Oxford, and grows jealous of her affinity with Michael. Lion receives threats to his gym from Cruz, an affiliate of Ronnie, who is now in prison but able to keep contact with him over the phone.

Noah attends a family tennis match to find Sophia partnered with Nick; out of jealousy, and when Nick's father suggests that he should consider dating Sophia, Noah reveals the relationship to him. He gives them an ultimatum; they must end the relationship, or Nick will lose his job at Leister Enterprises and Noah will lose the funding for her Oxford tuition fees. They agree to stage a break-up.

Nick lies to her that the following day he has a work meeting, but he is actually at the scheduled site to race with Cruz, which he only learns upon arrival, and which Noah finds out from Jenna. Nick races against Cruz and, because the latter cheats, loses, Noah offers him a rematch, which he agrees to when he hears who she is, and Jenna is arrested when police arrive.

Jenna, Noah, Briar and Michael go out and party dressed as the Spice Girls, while Nick celebrates a business deal with Sophia at a hotel. Nick doesn't answer Noah's calls on the night, and Noah doesn't answer Nick in the morning. Nick goes to Oxford and starts an argument, which they continue at his apartment in London. There, Nick and Noah have sex, and, after realising that Nick has marked her with a hickey, writes "You're mine", something he said during their argument, onto his wrist.

The couple argue later over Noah discovering that, after Nick told her he fell asleep early, he was with Sophia in her hotel room. Noah goes to race with Cruz because of this argument, and narrowly misses a spike strip set up by Ronnie's agents, which Cruz drives over and crashes into the wall because of. Nick tries to intercept Noah as she is driving, and blows up at her when she stops after Cruz's crash. They argue, Noah confronts him for keeping the truth from her, and Noah asks for them to take a break from each other.

Briar capitalises on this, and answers Noah's phone to tell Nick that she has moved on from him and is now dating Michael. Noah attends Lion's gym reopening, where the latter proposes to Jenna and Noah avoids confrontation with her mother.

Both Nick and Noah attend the company party with, respectively, Sophia, and Briar and Michael. Nick still believes that Noah is dating Michael, so kisses Sophia when she is watching. Noah tries to leave, upset, and Nick stops her on the way. Briar reveals their prior affiliation, him having broken her heart years ago, and Noah finds out that Briar lied to Nick on the phone. Later that night, Michael comforts Noah at his house, and they end up sleeping together.

Noah goes back to her dorm, finding Nick there. He apologises, saying that kissing Sophia made him feel nothing and that he loves her, and Noah cries, until Nick realises that she is wearing Michael's jacket and he calls her phone. Nick goes to Michael's house, who taunts him that he would never be able to properly have Noah because she loves Nick too deeply.

Noah drives to Michael's house, finding Nick sat on the pavement. She apologises and says that Michael meant nothing to her, but Nick in turn apologises and says he must go. The police arrive and Nick is arrested for attacking Michael. The car drives away as Noah looks on, and Nick turns his wrist to reveal the tattoo of Noah's handwriting, "You're mine."

== Cast ==
- Asha Banks as Noah Morgan
- Matthew Broome as Nick Leister
- Louisa Binder as Sophia Aitken
- Joel Nankervis as Michael
- Scarlett Rayner as Briar
- Enva Lewis as Jenna
- Kerim Hassan as Lion
- Orlando Norman as Cruz
- Ray Fearon as William Leister
- Eve Macklin as Ella
- Sam Buchanan as Ronnie

== Production ==
The film is an adaptation of the second book in Argentine-born Spanish author Mercedes Ron's Culpables trilogy, Culpa Tuya. It has Asha Banks and Matthew Broome reprising their roles as Noah and Nick from the first English-language adaptation of the trilogy, My Fault: London. The film is directed by Dani Girdwood and Charlotte Fassler, who also directed My Fault: London.

Joining the cast are Louisa Binder, Joel Nankervis, Scarlett Rayner and Orlando Norman.

The film is produced by Amazon MGM Studios and 42. Principal photography took place in London in June 2025. Filming locations also included Overton, Hampshire, and Brasenose College, Oxford. It was later reported the film was shot back-to-back with the sequel Our Fault: London, with director Chanya Button, right after Your Fault was completed filming.

== Release ==
The film was released on June 17, 2026 on Amazon Prime Video.
