= Jean Van Leer =

Belgian hockey player

Personal information
- Nationality: Belgian
- Born: 12 April 1919 Ixelles, Belgium
- Died: 16 February 2003 (aged 83)

Sport
- Sport: Field hockey

Jean Van Leer (12 April 1919 – 16 February 2003) was a Belgian field hockey player. He competed at the 1952 Summer Olympics and the 1956 Summer Olympics.
