= Ed Tullett =

English musician (born 1993)

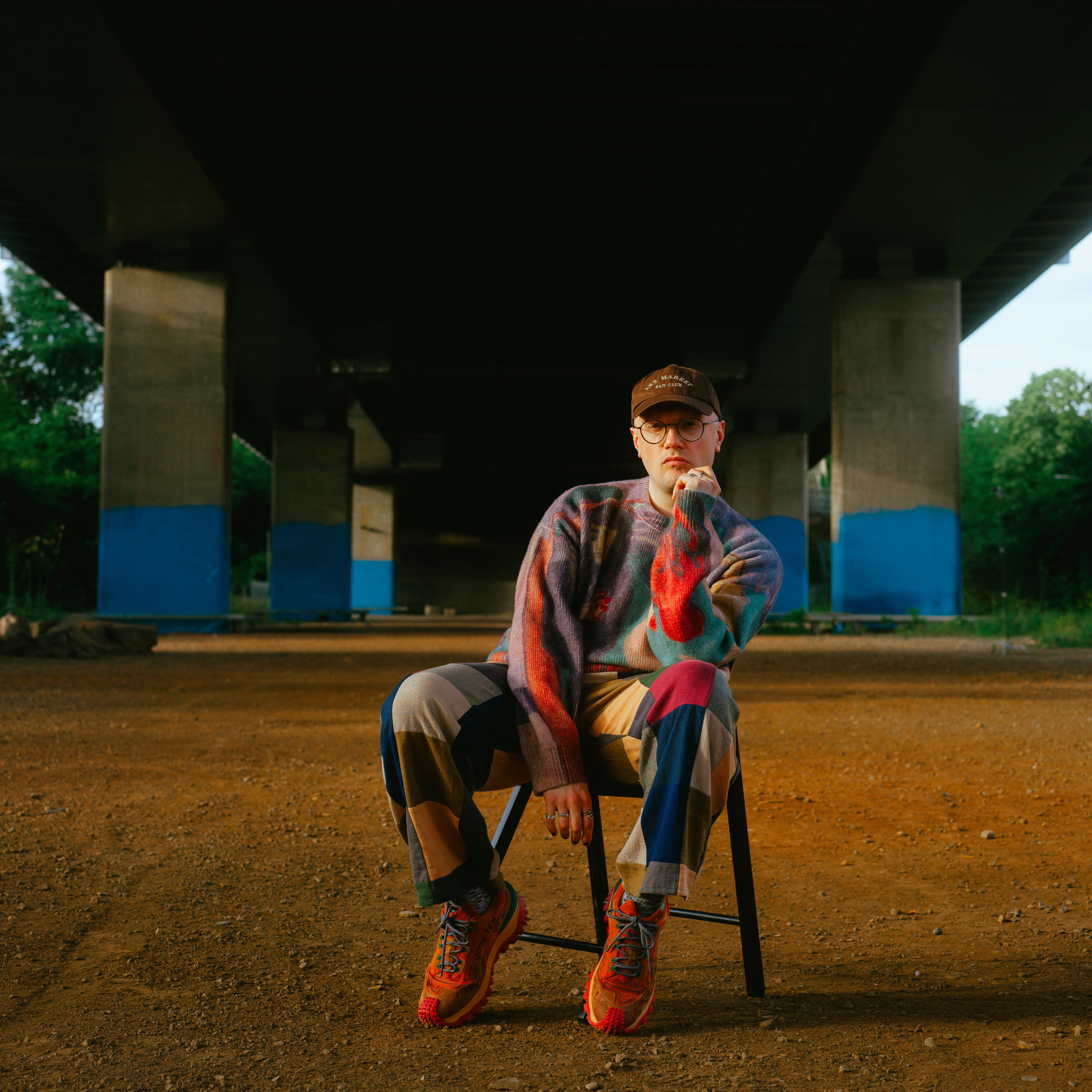
- Tullett in 2024

Background information
- Also known as: Lowswimmer; Easydoes
- Born: Edward Jamie Tullett; 20 October 1993 (age 32); Oxford, England
- Genres: Electronic; indie folk; experimental music; indie pop; experimental pop; folktronica
- Occupations: Singer-songwriter; musician
- Instruments: Vocals; guitar; synthesiser; piano
- Years active: 2012–present
- Labels: All Points; Nettwerk; Naïve; Monotreme Records; Dumont Dumont; Equal Vision
- Member of: Lissom; Hailaker; Tolari
- Formerly of: Ed Tullett & Novo Amor
- Website: edtullett.com

Ed Tullett (born 20 October 1993), also known by the monikers Lowswimmer and Easydoes, is an English multi-instrumentalist and singer-songwriter. His work includes collaborations with Novo Amor as well as the projects Lissom, Hailaker, and Tolari.

== Career ==
=== Solo work ===
In October 2012, Tullett signed with Equal Vision Records. In the same month, his remix of Bon Iver's "Hinnom, TX" was released on Spotify. He then issued an EP entitled Trawl through MTV Hype Music. Equal Vision followed this by digitally re-issuing a remastered version of his previously self-released album Never Joy, in December 2012. Tullett published the single "Oxblood" in April 2013. In September 2023, he released the album Lack Thereof.

=== with Novo Amor ===
Tullett began collaborating with Welsh indie-folk artist Novo Amor with their 2014 joint single "Faux". Their second single, "Alps", came out in April 2016. The duo's debut album, Heiress, was released in November 2017.

Tullett has co-writing credits on Novo Amor's 2018 album Birthplace, 2020's Cannot Be, Whatsoever, and 2024's Collapse List, the last of which is documented in the behind-the-scenes film Please Don't Stand Up When Room Is in Motion.

=== Lissom ===
In August 2018, Tullett formed the collaborative project Lissom, with French pianist Julien Marchal. The duo has since released two records: 2018's Lissom and 2022's Eclipses.

=== Hailaker ===
Since 2019, Tullett has been working with English musician Jemima Coulter on the project Hailaker. Their first, self-titled record, came out in April 2019. A second album, Holding, followed in April 2020. "Wavepool", a single featuring S. Carey, was released in May 2021. In 2024, the duo released their third album, Serenity Now.

=== Tolari ===
In 2020, Tullett formed Tolari, an instrumental electronic project with longtime friend Auryn Tate (Shinamo Moki). The pair released their debut album, Leylines, in 2022, and followed it with Death's Halo in 2024.

=== Lowswimmer ===
In June 2022, Tullett began publishing solo material again, under the moniker Lowswimmer, releasing the twinned albums Glasshouse 1 + 2 that year. Red-Eye Effect, Lowswimmer's third record, came out in May 2023. He has since issued the albums Interpretations (2024) and Godspeed, Fantasy (2025) under that name. In September 2025, he released the touring film World Over, which was accompanied by a soundtrack album.

=== Easydoes ===
In November 2025, Tullet announced his ambient project Easydoes, whose debut album is titled Liminality.

== Discography ==
=== Ed Tullett ===
Title	Details
Never Joy	Released: 2011; Label: self-released
Trawl (EP)	Released: 2012; Label: Equal Vision Records
Fiancé	Released: 2016; Label: Monotreme Records
Lack Thereof	Released: 29 September 2023; Label: All Points

=== Novo Amor & Ed Tullett ===
Title	Details
Heiress	Released: 2017; Label: All Points

=== Lissom ===
Title	Details
Lissom	Released: 2018; Label: Whales Records
Eclipses	Released: 2022; Label: Naïve Records

=== Hailaker ===
Excerpt from the full Hailaker discography

Title	Details
Hailaker	Released: 3 May 2019; Label: Lowswimmer Records
Holding	Released: 24 April 2020; Label: Lowswimmer Records
Serenity Now	Released: 26 June 2024; Label: All Points

=== Tolari ===
Title	Details
Leylines	Released: 2022; Label: Nettwerk
Death's Halo	Released: 25 October 2024; Label: Nettwerk

=== Lowswimmer ===
Title	Details
Glasshouse 1	Released: 3 June 2022; Label: Lowswimmer Records
Glasshouse 2	Released: 1 July 2022; Label: Lowswimmer Records
Red-Eye Effect	Released: 19 May 2023; Label: All Points
Head Rolls Off (EP)	Released: 11 October 2024
Interpretations	Released: 11 November 2024; Label: Group Speed
Godspeed, Fantasy	Released: 6 June 2025; Label: Group Speed
World Over	Released: 18 September 2025

=== Easydoes ===
Title	Details
Liminality	Released: 7 November 2025; Label: Lunar X
