= Gwyn Manning =

Welsh footballer

Personal information
- Full name: Gwyn Thomas Manning
- Date of birth: 19 August 1915
- Place of birth: Wales
- Date of death: 15 February 2003 (aged 87)
- Position: Left back

Senior career*
Years	Team	Apps	(Gls)
- Troedyrhiw
- Treharris
- Merthyr Tydfil

International career
- Wales amateur
1948	Great Britain	1	(0)
- * Club domestic league appearances and goals

Gwyn Thomas Manning (19 August 1915 – 15 February 2003) was a Welsh amateur footballer who captained Great Britain at the 1948 Summer Olympics.

== Career ==
Manning played club football with Troedyrhiw, Treharris and Merthyr Tydfil. He combined his playing career with a job as a painter and decorator. He also played for the Wales amateur national team.

He represented Great Britain at the 1948 Summer Olympics, and was the team's captain at the tournament.
