= Tore Karlsson =

Swedish boxer

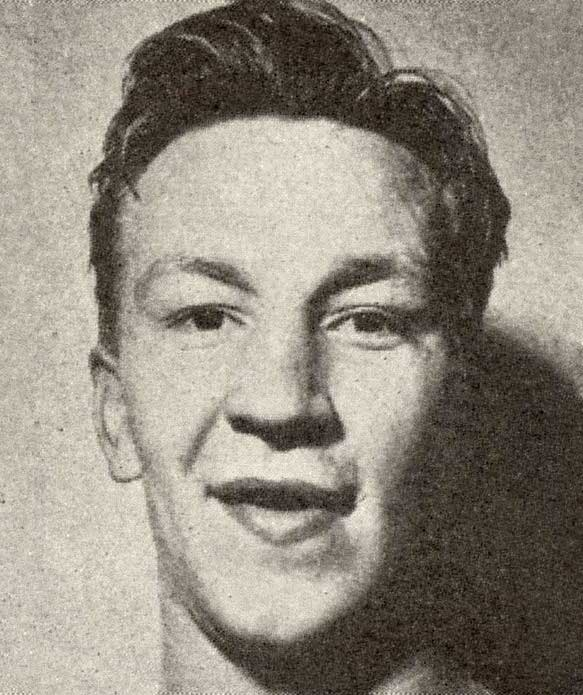

Personal information
- Nationality: Swedish
- Born: 3 December 1924; Norrköping, Sweden
- Died: 20 February 2003 (aged 78); Norrköping, Sweden

Sport
- Sport: Boxing
- Club: BK Akilles, Norrköping

Tore Lennart Karlsson (3 December 1924 – 20 February 2003) was a Swedish boxer. He competed in the middleweight event at the 1948 Summer Olympics and was eliminated in the first bout.
