= Novo Amor =

Welsh singer-songwriter (born 1991)

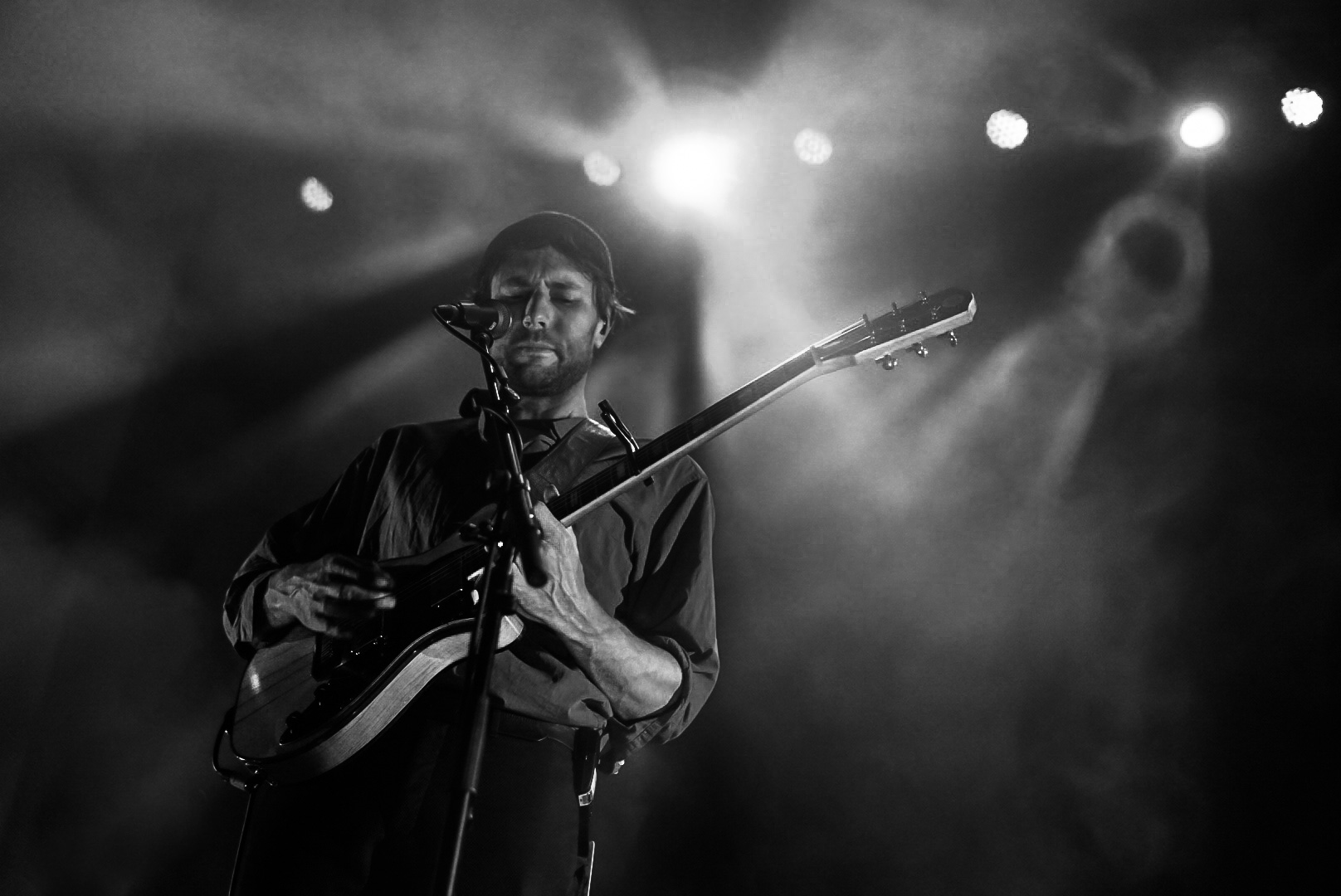
- Novo Amor performing at Queen's Hall, Edinburgh

Background information
- Also known as: Novo Amor
- Born: Ali John Meredith-Lacey; 11 August 1991 (age 35); Aberystwyth, Wales
- Genres: Indie rock, folk
- Occupations: Singer-songwriter, musician
- Instruments: Vocals, guitar, banjo, bass guitar, drums, percussion, piano, keyboards
- Years active: 2012–present
- Labels: All Points, Believe Recordings, Dumont Dumont, Brilliance Records, Lacey Music
- Website: novoamor.co.uk

Ali John Meredith-Lacey (born 11 August 1991), better known under his stage name Novo Amor, is a Welsh multi-instrumentalist, singer, songwriter, sound designer and producer. Lacey rose to prominence after the release of his debut EP Woodgate, NY in March 2014.

== Career ==
Lacey was born on 11 August 1991 and brought up in Llanidloes, Wales and now resides in Cardiff. Drift, a two-track single self-released in 2012, was Lacey's first release as Novo Amor.

Lacey's first Novo Amor EP, Woodgate, NY, was released 31 March 2014 on Norwegian label Brilliance Records. Building on the success of the EP, Lacey released the single "Faux", a collaboration with Ed Tullett, on Dumont Dumont and Brilliance Records on 23 June 2014. In the same month, Lacey also signed to UK publisher BDi Music, part of Bucks Music Group.

"Callow", a further single as Novo Amor, was released 17 November 2014. This was followed by "Welcome to the Jungle", a Guns N' Roses cover for an AXE/Lynx advertising campaign on 6 January 2015, its video directed by Nabil. Lacey toured Germany, Switzerland and Austria across April and May 2015, and was nominated for 2 awards at the Music Week Sync Awards for the use of his music commercially. "Anchor", another single as Novo Amor, was released 23 October 2015.

A second collaborative single with Ed Tullett, "Alps", was released on 15 April 2016.

On 26 May 2017, Bathing Beach, the second of Novo Amor's EPs, was released via AllPoints, the in-house label of Believe Recordings.

On 10 November 2017, Lacey and Ed Tullett released Heiress, their full collaborative album on All Points.

On 14 June 2018, Lacey announced his debut solo record Birthplace, to be released on 19 October 2018 via All Points. To promote the album, Lacey collaborated with Sil van der Woerd and Jorik Dozy (Studio Birthplace), producer Sean Lin and New Frontier Pictures, and cinematographer Nihal Friedel on the music video for the single 'Birthplace'. The video shows how humans are harming the ocean, from the view of free diver Michael Board. The video featured a large model of a whale, "made from plastic collected by school children, who received books in return for their donations". The music video won 'Independent Video of the Year' at the Association Of Independent Music (AIM) Awards.

Lacey toured with Gia Margaret in 2019. They recorded and released two songs together, "Lucky For You" and "No Fun" on 28 February 2019.

In August 2019, Lacey started working on his second full-length album at a home-made studio at Wales, UK. The album recording ended around February 2020. On 30 July 2020, he announced the release of his second solo album, Cannot Be, Whatsoever, through AllPoints on 6 November 2020. The album features an embroidered cover by Dutch artist Tilleke Schwarz, titled 'Birdcage', later becoming one of the songs titles in the album. On 2 December, Lacey released the album documentary titled 'Please Don't Stand Up When Room Is In Motion' directed by Josh Bennett.

On 29 July 2022, Lacey released Antarctican Dream Machine, an instrumental album he recorded during his time in Antarctica aboard Greenpeace's Arctic Sunrise on a research expedition. It was created over a period of three weeks, to capture the inspiration he had and create something without overanalyzing the process.

On 23 February 2024, he announced his new album Collapse List, released on 05 April 2024. The album artwork and imagery were designed by Lacey himself, with additional Elements by Yvette Young. In a teaser video, directed by Josh Bennett, Lacey explained that the album title is inspired by the S-Town Podcast, where the protagonist formulates Collapse Lists with things that need to change. Lacey said that it almost felt like narrating his own collapse list, with the things that needed to change in his life.

Lacey’s songs have been featured in movie soundtracks from Buckley's Chance, Five Feet Apart, Elite, and the video game Life is Strange: True Colors.

=== Etymology ===
Novo Amor is Portuguese for New Love. The artist confirmed in a tweet that the name had a "Portuguese/Latin" [sic] origin, without providing any further explanation. He stated in an interview that he went through a break-up in 2012 before he started producing and that led to this name as he found his "New Love" in music.

== Personal life ==
In a 2024 interview about his new album, Collapse List, which released later that year, Lacey discussed exploring his own neurodivergence and how this journey was one of the main themes of the album.

== Discography ==
=== Studio albums ===
Title	Details
Heiress	Released: 10 November 2017; Label: AllPoints; Formats: CD, digital download, streaming, vinyl
Birthplace	Released: 19 October 2018; Label: AllPoints; Formats: CD, digital download, streaming, vinyl
Cannot Be, Whatsoever	Released: 6 November 2020; Label: AllPoints; Formats: CD, digital download, streaming, vinyl
Antarctican Dream Machine	Released: 29 July 2022; Label: AllPoints; Formats: digital download, streaming
Collapse List	Released: 05 April 2024; Label: AllPoints; Formats: digital download, streaming

=== Extended plays ===
Title	EP details
Woodgate, NY	Released: 31 March 2014; Label: Brilliance Records; Format: digital download, streaming, vinyl
Bathing Beach	Released: 26 May 2017; Label: AllPoints; Format: CD, digital download, streaming, vinyl

=== Singles ===
Title	Year	Certifications	Album
"So We Drift / Flay"	2012		Non-album single
"Holland"	2014		Woodgate, NY.
"From Gold"	2014		Woodgate, NY.
"Faux" (with Ed Tullett)	2014		Non-album singles
"Callow"	2014		Non-album singles
"Welcome to the Jungle"	2015		Non-album singles
"Anchor"	2015	BPI: Silver; ARIA: Platinum; MC: Platinum; PMB: Platinum; RIAA: Gold	Bathing Beach
"Alps" (with Ed Tullett)	2016		Non-album single
"Carry You"	2017	ARIA: Gold	Bathing Beach
"Cavalry" (with Ed Tullett)	2017		Heiress
"Silvery" (with Ed Tullett)	2017		Heiress
"Terraform" (with Ed Tullett)	2017		Heiress
"State Lines"	2018	BPI: Silver; ARIA: Gold; MC: Platinum	Birthplace
"Birthplace"	2018		Birthplace
"Utican"	2018		Birthplace
"Sleepless / Repeat Until Death"	2018	MC: Gold	Birthplace
"No Fun / Lucky for You" (with Gia Margaret)	2019		Non-album singles
"I Make Sparks"	2019		Non-album singles
"Halloween / Decimal"	2020		Cannot Be, Whatsoever
"Opaline"	2020		Cannot Be, Whatsoever
"If We're Being Honest"	2020		Cannot Be, Whatsoever
"I Feel Better"	2020		Cannot Be, Whatsoever
"Haven" (from Life Is Strange: True Colors)	2021		Non-album single
"You Are Here / Ataraxia"	2022		Antarctican Dream Machine
"Land Where I Land"	2024		Collapse List
"Years On"	2024		Collapse List
"Same Day, Same Face"	2024		Collapse List
"Monty (^ᴥ^)" (with Yvette Young)	2025		TBA
