= Eric Smith =

Eric Smith or Erik Smith may refer to:

== Sports ==
- Eric Smith (safety) (born 1983), American former football player and assistant coach
- Eric Smith (offensive lineman) (born 1995), American football offensive tackle
- Eric Smith (wide receiver) (born 1971), American football wide receiver
- Eric Smith (Scottish footballer) (1934–1991), Scottish international footballer who played for Celtic and Leeds United
- Eric Smith (Swedish footballer) (born 1997), Swedish football midfielder
- Eric Smith (canoeist) (born 1964), Canadian Olympic sprint canoeist
- Eric Smith (racing driver), American stock car racing driver
- Erik Smith (javelin thrower) (born 1971), American javelin thrower, winner of the 1993 javelin throw at the NCAA Division I Outdoor Track and Field Championships

== Politics ==
- Eric Smith (British politician) (1908–1951), British Conservative politician, MP, 1950–1951
- Eric Smith (Florida politician) (born 1942), American politician in Florida
- Eric Smith (Michigan politician), prosecuting attorney of Macomb County, Michigan
- Eric Smith (Kansas politician) (born 1966), member of the Kansas House of Representatives

== Other ==
- Eric Smith (artist) (1919–2017), Australian artist
- Eric Smith (British Army officer) (1923–1998), British Army officer and military historian
- Eric Smith (general) (born 1960s), United States Marine Corps general
- Eric Smith (sportscaster) (born 1975), Canadian basketball analyst and Toronto Raptors radio sportscaster
- Eric Smith (murderer) (born 1980), American murderer, convicted of killing a 4-year-old boy when he was 13 years old
- Eric J. Smith (educator) (fl. 1970s–2010s), American educator in Florida
- Eric Ledell Smith (1949–2008), American historian and author
- Erik Smith (1931–2004), German-born British music producer

== See also ==
- Eric Schmidt (disambiguation)
- Eric Smyth, Northern Irish politician
- Eric Dorman-Smith (1895–1969), British Army soldier
