= Smidt Tech =

Smidt Tech High School
- Los Angeles, California; United States

Information
- Founded: 2012
- Founder: Eric Smidt
- School district: Los Angeles Unified School District
- Principal: Josephine Pineda
- Grades: 9–12
- Website: www.smidttech.org

Smidt Tech, also known as Alliance Susan & Eric Smidt Technology High School, is a free public charter school, authorized by the Los Angeles Unified School District and is located in the Lincoln Heights area, northeast of downtown Los Angeles. The area is the primary home to Latino and Asian immigrant families. The high school shares its campus with El Rio Community School It is one of 21 public schools (15 high schools and 6 middle schools) which make up Alliance for College-Ready Public Schools, a non-profit charter management organization that covers east and south Los Angeles. Smidt Tech opened in 2012 when Eric Smidt, chairman and CEO of Harbor Freight Tools, donated the funds towards its formation.

According to the Smidt Tech website, its mission "is to operate a small high performance school equipped to prepare each student to enter and succeed in college." The high school has an average daily attendance rate of 97.68%.
