= Helping Homeless Veterans Act of 2013 =

- Long title: To amend title 38, United States Code, to expand the definition of homeless veteran for purposes of benefits under the laws administered by the Secretary of Veterans Affairs, and for other purposes.
- Announced in: the 113th United States Congress
- Sponsored by: Sen. Mark Begich (D, AK)
- Number of co-sponsors: 4

Codification
- Acts affected: McKinney-Vento Homeless Assistance Act
- U.S.C. sections affected: 42 U.S.C. § 11302, 38 U.S.C. § 2002

Legislative history
- Introduced in the Senate as S. 287 by Sen. Mark Begich (D, AK) on February 12, 2013; Committee consideration by United States Senate Committee on Veterans' Affairs; Passed the Senate on November 6, 2013 (Unanimous consent)

The Helping Homeless Veterans Act of 2013 (S. 287), long title "To amend title 38, United States Code, to expand the definition of homeless veteran for purposes of benefits under the laws administered by the Secretary of Veterans Affairs, and for other purposes," is a bill that would change the definition of "homeless veteran" to expand persons that are covered. The new definition would "allow a veteran or veterans’ family member fleeing domestic violence or sexual assault to be categorized as homeless in order to receive certain benefits offered by the Department of Veterans’ Affairs." The law would increase the per diem payments that homeless veterans receive for assistance in finding a new home and authorize the payment of per diems to the dependents of homeless veterans. It passed in the United States Senate during the 113th United States Congress.

== Background ==
There is a related bill, H.R. 897, that was introduced into the United States House of Representatives during the 113th Congress.

== Provisions of the bill ==
This summary is based largely on the summary provided by the Congressional Research Service, a public domain source.

The bill S. 287 would include in the formal definition of a homeless veteran, for purposes of eligibility for benefits through the Department of Veterans Affairs (VA), a veteran or veteran's family fleeing domestic or dating violence, sexual assault, stalking, or other dangerous or life-threatening conditions in the current housing situation, including where the health and safety of children are jeopardized, there is no other residence, and there is a lack of resources or support networks to obtain other permanent housing.

== Congressional Budget Office report ==
This summary is based largely on the summary provided by the Congressional Budget Office, as ordered reported by the Senate Committee on Veterans’ Affairs on July 24, 2013. This is a public domain source.

S. 287 would reauthorize and expand several programs for homeless veterans that are administered by the Department of Veterans Affairs (VA). The Congressional Budget Office (CBO) estimated that implementing the bill would cost $842 million over the 2014–2018 period, assuming appropriation of the specified and estimated amounts.

In addition, the CBO estimated that enacting the bill would decrease net direct spending by $294 million over the 2014–2023 period; therefore, pay-as-you-go procedures apply to the bill. Enacting S. 287 would not affect revenues.

S. 287 contains no intergovernmental or private-sector mandates as defined in the Unfunded Mandates Reform Act (UMRA).

== Procedural history ==
=== Senate ===
S. 287 was introduced into the Senate on February 12, 2013, by Sen. Mark Begich (D, AK). It was referred to the United States Senate Committee on Veterans' Affairs, which held a hearing about the bill on May 9, 2013. The bill was accompanied by Senate Report 113-110. The Senate voted by Unanimous consent on November 6, 2013, to pass the bill.

== Debate and discussion ==
The National Coalition for Homeless Veterans testified in favor of the bill on the May 9, 2013 hearings.

== See also ==
- List of bills in the 113th United States Congress
- Homelessness
