= Erik Schmidt =

Erik Schmidt may refer to:

- Erik Schmidt (painter) (1925–2014), painter and writer
- Erik Schmidt (handballer) (born 1992), German handball player
- Erik Schmidt (sailor) (born 1939), Brazilian sailor

== See also ==
- Erich Schmidt (disambiguation)
- Eric Schmitt (disambiguation)
- Eric Smidt, American businessman, Chairman and CEO of Harbor Freight Tools
