= Eric Schmidt (disambiguation) =

Eric Schmidt (born 1955) is an American businessman and former Executive Chairman of Alphabet, Inc.

Eric Schmidt may also refer to:

- Eric Schmidt (American football), who played for the 2001 North Dakota Fighting Sioux football team
- Eric Schmidt (handballer), handballer who participated in 2013–14 EHF Champions League qualifying

== See also ==
- Eric Smidt, American businessman, Chairman and CEO of Harbor Freight Tools
- Erik Schmidt (disambiguation)
- Erich Schmidt (disambiguation)
- Eric Schmitt (disambiguation)
