= Erich Schmidt =

Erich Schmidt may refer to:

- Erich Schmidt (archaeologist) (1897–1964), German and American-naturalized archaeologist
- Erich Schmidt (historian) (1853–1913), German historian of literature
- Erich Schmidt (pilot) (1914–1941), German Luftwaffe ace
- Erich Schmidt (soldier) (1911–1977), German officer
- Erich Schmidt (wrestler) (1925–2009), German Olympic wrestler
- Erich Schmidt (politician) (1831–1904), German-born American politician in Texas
- Erich Schmidt (Austrian politician) (1943–2019), Austrian politician and entrepreneur

== See also ==
- Eric Schmitt (disambiguation)
- Eric Schmidt (disambiguation)
- Erik Schmidt (disambiguation)
- Eric Smidt, American businessman
