= Erich Schmid =

Erich Schmid may refer to:

- Erich Schmid (conductor) (1907–2000), Swiss composer and conductor
- Erich Schmid (physicist) (1896–1983), physicist from Austria

== See also ==
- Erich Schmidt (disambiguation)
