= Eric Schmitt (disambiguation) =

Eric Schmitt (born 1975) is the junior U.S. senator from Missouri.

Eric Schmitt may also refer to:

- Éric-Emmanuel Schmitt (born 1960), French writer
- Eric Schmitt (journalist) (born 1969), a Pulitzer prize-winning American journalist

== See also ==
- Eric Schmidt, an American businessman and former Executive Chairman of Alphabet, Inc.
- Eric Smidt, an American businessman, chairman and CEO of Harbor Freight Tools
- Eric Schmidt (disambiguation)
- Erich Schmidt (disambiguation)
