= Erich Schmidt (pilot) =

German World War II fighter pilot (1914–1941)

- Born: 17 November 1914; Neuhaus am Rennweg
- Died: 31 August 1941 (aged 26); Dubno, Ukraine
- Military career
- Allegiance: Nazi Germany
- Branch: Luftwaffe
- Service years: 1938–1941
- Rank: Oberleutnant (first lieutenant)
- Nickname: "Schmidtchen"
- Unit: JG 53
- Conflicts: World War II: Battle of Britain; Operation Barbarossa (MIA)
- Awards: Knight's Cross of the Iron Cross

Erich "Schmidtchen" Schmidt (17 November 1914 – 31 August 1941) was a Luftwaffe ace and recipient of the Knight's Cross of the Iron Cross during World War II. The Knight's Cross of the Iron Cross was the highest award in the military and paramilitary forces of Nazi Germany during World War II. On 31 August 1941, Schmidt was shot down by anti-aircraft artillery on the Eastern Front near Dubno. Although he was reported to have bailed out safely, he remains missing in action. During his career, he was credited with 47 aerial victories claimed in an unknown number of combat missions.

== Early life and career ==
Schmidt was born on 17 November 1914 in Neuhaus am Rennweg, then in the Thuringian states of the German Empire. He volunteered for military service in the Luftwaffe of Nazi Germany in early 1938. Trained as a fighter pilot, (Note: Flight training in the Luftwaffe progressed through the levels A1, A2 and B1, B2, referred to as A/B flight training. A training included theoretical and practical training in aerobatics, navigation, long-distance flights and dead-stick landings. The B courses included high-altitude flights, instrument flights, night landings and training to handle the aircraft in difficult situations.) Schmidt was posted to 2. Staffel (2nd squadron) of Jagdgeschwader 53 (JG 53—53rd Fighter Wing), a squadron of I. Gruppe (1st group) of JG 53, in September 1939.

In February 1940, Schmidt was transferred to the recently formed 9. Staffel of JG 53, a squadron of III. Gruppe. The Gruppe had been formed on 26 September 1939 at Wiesbaden–Erbenheim Airfield. Leadership of the Gruppe had been given to Hauptmann Werner Mölders who had previously commanded 1. Staffel. Formation of the 9. Staffel was headed by Oberleutnant Ernst Boenigk. At the time, the Gruppe was equipped with the Messerschmitt Bf 109 E.

== World War II ==
Following the Armistice of 22 June 1940, III. Gruppe moved to Rennes Airfield where they patrolled the costal area of Brittany. On 10 July, the Gruppe relocated to an airfield at Lanvéoc-Poulmic, sometimes referred to as Brest-South airfield. Here, they flew their first combat missions during the Battle of Britain on 11 August, escorting Junkers Ju 87 dive bombers attacking British shipping. The next day, the Luftwaffe attacked airfields of the Royal Air Force (RAF), harbor facilities on the Isle of Portland, and Chain Home early-warning radar installations. That day, Schmidt claimed his first aerial victory. In combat east of the Isle of Wight, he claimed an RAF fighter shot down.

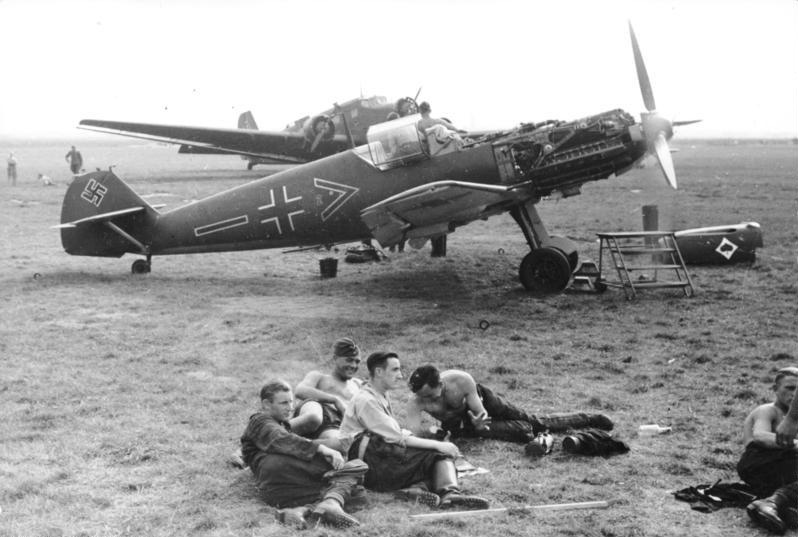
A Messerschmitt Bf 109 E-1 of JG 53, similar to those flown by Schmidt

On 24 August, III. Gruppe began its relocation from Brest to Le Touquet Airfield, near Étaples and Le Touquet in the Pas-de-Calais on the English Channel. The Gruppe stayed here until 19 December. On 31 August, III. Gruppe flew a combat air patrol to Dover. In aerial combat with RAF fighters between 20:35 and 20:42, Schmidt claimed his second aerial victory. On 9 September, Schmidt claimed a Supermarine Spitfire for his fourth aerial victory. For his achievements, he was awarded both classes of the Iron Cross (Eisernes Kreuz). On 15 September, later dubbed Battle of Britain Day, Schmidt claimed two aerial victories on the first mission of the day. On the second mission, flown later in the afternoon, he claimed his third aerial victory of the day, taking his total to seven. Schmidt claimed his tenth aerial victory on 30 September.

Flying a fighter bomber escort mission on 2 October, Schmidt claimed two aerial victories. Three days later, RAF Fighter Command reported the loss of two Hawker Hurricanes and one Spitfire fighter. Luftwaffe pilots claimed five aerial victories, including one by Schmidt which brought his total to 13. On 30 November 1940, Schmidt claimed his last aerial victory of 1940 and 17th in total. He was then briefly transferred to the Stab (headquarters unit) of III. Gruppe where he served as Gruppenadjutant, the assisting officer, helping the commanding officer of the Gruppe. Schmidt emerged as the leading fighter pilot of JG 53 during the Battle of Britain.

III. Gruppe was withdrawn from the Channel Front on 19 December and moved to Mönchengladbach. There, the Gruppe was replenished while the pilots were sent on a skiing holiday until late January 1941. They then received a full complement of Bf 109 F-2 aircraft. The pilots continued to train and familiarize themselves with this new aircraft before on 18 March, III. Gruppe was again ordered to the English Channel where they were based at Berck-sur-Mer.

=== Operation Barbarossa ===
On 8 June 1941, the bulk of JG 53's air elements moved via Jever, in northern Germany, to Mannheim-Sandhofen. There the aircraft were given a maintenance overhaul prior to moving east. On 12 June, III. Gruppe was ordered to transfer to a forward airfield at Sobolewo. On 21 June, the Geschwaderkommodore (wing commander) of JG 53 and its Gruppenkommandeure were summoned to nearby Suwałki, where Generalfeldmarschall (field marshal) Albert Kesselring gave the final instructions for the upcoming attack. Wolf-Dietrich Wilcke, who had been appointed Gruppenkommandeur of III. Gruppe on 12 August 1940, briefed his pilots that evening.

On 22 June, the Geschwader crossed into Soviet airspace to support Operation Barbarossa, the invasion of the Soviet Union, which opened the Eastern Front. III. Gruppe took off on its first mission at 6:00 a.m., a fighter escort mission for Junkers Ju 87 dive bomber attacking Grodno. On this mission, Schmidt claimed a Polikarpov I-16 fighter shot down. On 23 July, Schmidt was awarded the Knight's Cross of the Iron Cross (Ritterkreuz des Eisernen Kreuzes) for 31 aerial victories claimed. The presentation was made by Oberst Werner Mölders.

On 26 July, Schmidt claimed five Ilyushin DB-3 bombers from 3 BAK (Bombardirovochnyy Aviatsionyy Korpus—bomber aviation corps) shot down, making him an "ace-in-a-day". He shot down his final three victories on 29 August taking his total to 47. On 31 August 1941, returning from a combat air patrol, Schmidt was shot down east of Velikiye Luki. His Bf 109 F-2 (Werknummer 12633—factory number) had been hit by Soviet anti-aircraft artillery. Schmidt bailed out near Dubno and was seen to have safely landed, he was never seen again and remains missing in action. At the time, Schmidt was the leading fighter pilot of III. Gruppe and was posthumously promoted to Oberleutnant (first lieutenant).

== Summary of career ==
=== Aerial victory claims ===
According to Obermaier, Schmidt was credited with 47 aerial victories, including 28 aerial victories claimed on the Eastern Front and 19 on the Western Front. Page also lists him with 47 aerial victories of which 19 were claimed on the Western Front. Mathews and Foreman, authors of Luftwaffe Aces — Biographies and Victory Claims, researched the German Federal Archives and found records for 47 aerial victory claims, including 30 aerial victories claimed on the Eastern Front and 17 on the Western Front.

Chronicle of aerial victories
This and the ♠ (Ace of spades) indicates those aerial victories which made Schmidt an "ace-in-a-day", a term which designates a fighter pilot who has shot down five or more airplanes in a single day.
Claim	Date	Time	Type	Location	Claim	Date	Time	Type	Location
– 9. Staffel of Jagdgeschwader 53 – At the Channel and over England — 26 June 1940 – 7 June 1941
1	12 August 1940	12:37	Spitfire	Isle of Wight	10	30 September 1940	14:33	Spitfire	
2	31 August 1940	20:42	Spitfire	vicinity of Dover	11	2 October 1940	11:06	Spitfire	Thames Estuary
3	5 September 1940	16:35	Spitfire		12	2 October 1940	11:10	Spitfire	Thames Estuary
4	9 September 1940	18:55	Spitfire		13	5 October 1940	12:33	Hurricane	Thames Estuary
5	15 September 1940	12:44	Spitfire		14	7 October 1940	14:20	Spitfire	Mayfield
6	15 September 1940	13:08	Spitfire	10 km (6.2 mi) south of London	15	10 October 1940	11:30	Spitfire	Thames Estuary
7	15 September 1940	15:36	Spitfire		16	1 November 1940	12:45	Spitfire	Tunbridge Wells
8	17 September 1940	16:41	Spitfire		17	30 November 1940	11:30	Spitfire	north of Dover
9	27 September 1940	13:33	Spitfire						
– 9. Staffel of Jagdgeschwader 53 – Operation Barbarossa — 22 June – 31 August 1941
18	22 June 1941	07:15	I-16	vicinity of Grodno	33♠	26 July 1941	10:10	DB-3	
19	22 June 1941	11:35	DJ-6		34♠	26 July 1941	10:12	DB-3	
20	22 June 1941	18:25	I-16		35♠	26 July 1941	18:28	DB-3	
21	22 June 1941	20:45	DJ-6		36♠	26 July 1941	18:32	DB-3	
22	25 June 1941	08:33	SB-3		37	2 August 1941	13:45	I-18	
23	25 June 1941	11:30	SB-3		38	5 August 1941	10:41	I-18	
24	26 June 1941	07:28	DB-3		39	5 August 1941	10:46	I-18	
25	26 June 1941	07:41	DB-3		40	7 August 1941	10:22	I-16	
26	27 June 1941	05:08	DB-3		41	19 August 1941	13:05	I-16	vicinity of Velikiye Luki
27	27 June 1941	14:57	DB-3		42	23 August 1941	17:00	I-18 (MiG-1)	vicinity of Velikiye Luki
28	27 June 1941	18:34	DB-3		43	25 August 1941	14:55	V-11 (Il-2)	Velikiye Luki/Toropets
29	2 July 1941	20:09	I-153		44	27 August 1941	16:25	I-153	
30	4 July 1941	12:21	I-16		45	29 August 1941	15:35	I-16	
31	14 July 1941	18:05	I-15		46	29 August 1941	15:44	I-18	
32♠	26 July 1941	09:35	DB-3		47	29 August 1941	15:46	I-18	

=== Awards ===
- Iron Cross (1939)
  - 2nd Class
  - 1st Class (12 September 1940)
- Knight's Cross of the Iron Cross on 23 July 1941 as Leutnant and pilot in the III./Jagdgeschwader 53 (Note: According to Scherzer as pilot in the 9./Jagdgeschwader 53.)
