= Berck =

- Commune
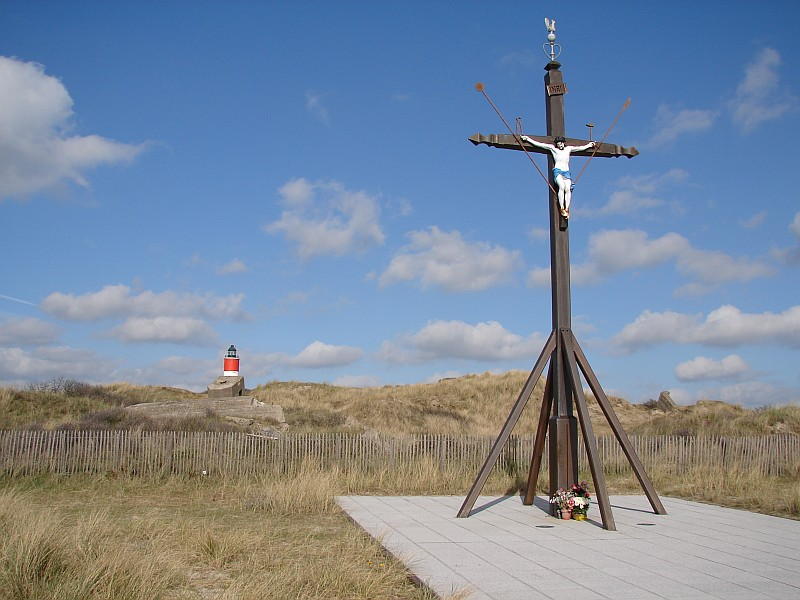
- Sailors' Calvary with remains of the Nazi coastal defences behind

- Coat of arms
- Location of Berck
- Location within France Location within Hauts-de-France
- Coordinates: 50°24′32″N 1°35′36″E
- Country: France
- Region: Hauts-de-France
- Department: Pas-de-Calais
- Arrondissement: Montreuil
- Canton: Berck
- Intercommunality: CA Deux Baies en Montreuillois

Government
  - Mayor (2020–2026): Bruno Cousein
- Area^{1}: 14.88 km^{2} (5.75 sq mi)
- Elevation: 9 m (30 ft)
- Highest elevation: 30 m (98 ft)
- Lowest elevation: 0 m (0 ft)
- Population (2023): 12,951
  - Density: 870.4/km^{2} (2,254/sq mi)
- Time zone: UTC+01:00 (CET)
  - Summer (DST): UTC+02:00 (CEST)
- INSEE/Postal code: 62108 /62600
- ^{1} French Land Register data, which excludes lakes, ponds, glaciers > 1 km^{2} (0.386 sq mi or 247 acres) and river estuaries.

Berck (French pronunciation: [bɛʁk]), sometimes referred to as Berck-sur-Mer in French or Berck-su-Mér in Picard (transl. Berck on Sea), is a commune in the northern French department of Pas-de-Calais.

Situated on the English Channel immediately north the mouth of the river Authie, Berck boasts over 11 kilometres (6.8 mi) of sandy beaches and grass-topped dunes, and since the middle of the 19th century it has been a destination for convalescents and vacationers.

== Toponymy ==
Various forms of Berck's name were in use by the early 13th century. Datum Bergis and Berc appear in documents from 1215, and Bierk appears in a document from in 1282. Its specific etymology is unknown and may come from either the Germanic berg ("hill") or birkja ("place of the birch trees").

== History ==
By the start of the 14th century, Berck was an established fishing village. In 1301, it was recorded to have 150 homesteads with 800 inhabitants. The oldest parts of Berck are now 1.5 kilometres (0.93 mi) inland from both river and sea, presumably because of deposition, but at the time of its founding the village was on the coast and what is now the church of St-Jean-Baptiste began its existence as a lighthouse (first wooden, then stone).

As a result of the retreating coastline, boats were designed with flat bottoms so that they could be drawn up on the beach. A cart was driven out to them in order to bring in the catch (see Eugène Boudin's painting below).

Berck was a location of combat for centuries. The chronicler Enguerrand de Monstrelet mentions that during 1414 the English garrison in Calais raided south and burned the town. During the second siege of Montreuil in 1544, the English advanced from the south and burned 200 houses, the church and the mill as they passed through Berck. What was left of the place was burned by the French on their way to relieve the siege.

In the mid-19th century, Berck was given a therapeutic role in the treatment of tuberculosis. The Maritime hospital was inaugurated in 1869 by Empress Eugenie. Other hospitals and benevolent institutes were soon created to cater for the sick and those in need of rest and recuperation. It was at this time that the medical benefits of sea bathing were being recommended. The town, advertised as just a three-hour journey from Paris, began to build up its tourist trade with the help of the railways.

At first passengers had to alight at the nearby town of Verton, on the main line to Calais, but in 1893 a 1,000 mm (3 ft 3 3/8 in) metre gauge branch line was built connecting Berck with other towns in the region. As well as carrying passengers, the train carried goods traffic from the brick-works at Berck Ville. Known locally as le Tortillard for its wandering route, it was closed in 1955. There was a later narrow-gauge line running northwards through the dunes from Berck Plage to Paris-Plage, as Le Touquet was then known. It was built in stages via Merlimont between 1909 and 1912, but gradually it sanded over and closed in 1929.

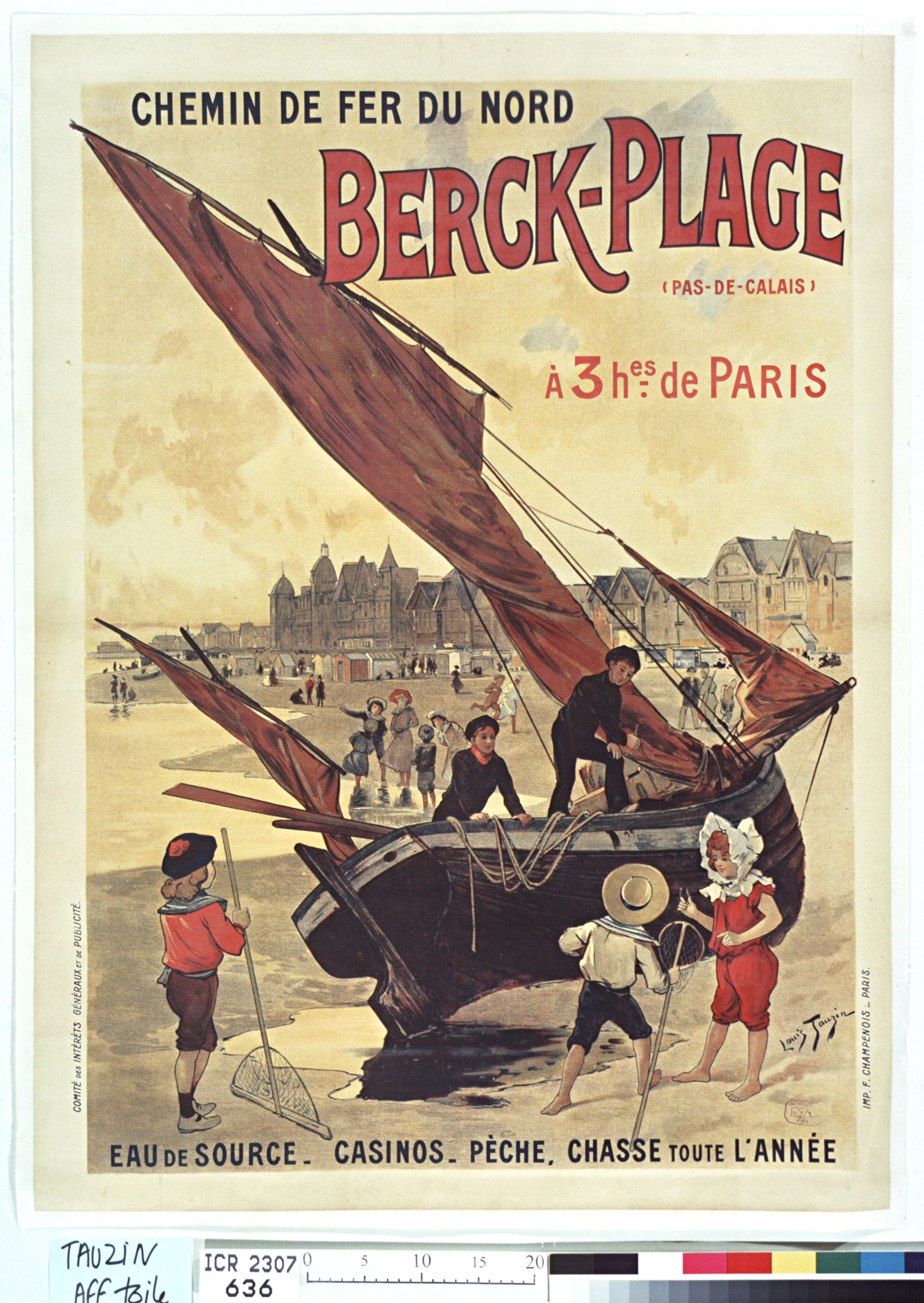
Railway advertising

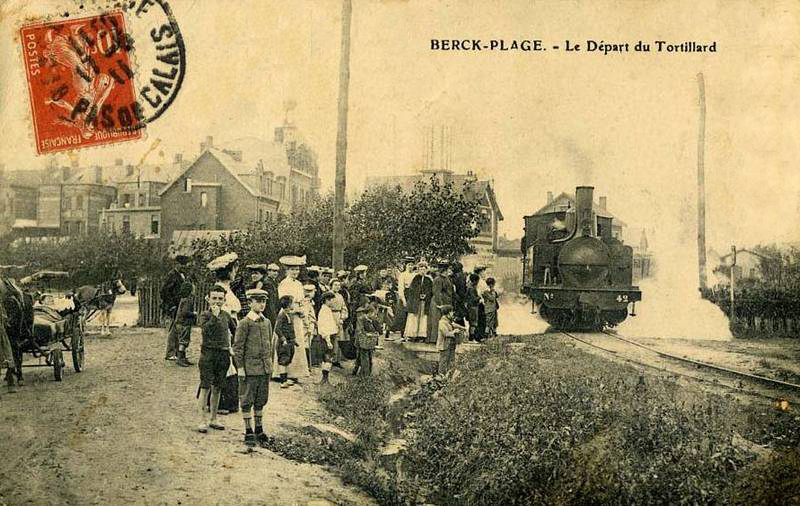
The beach station (1911)

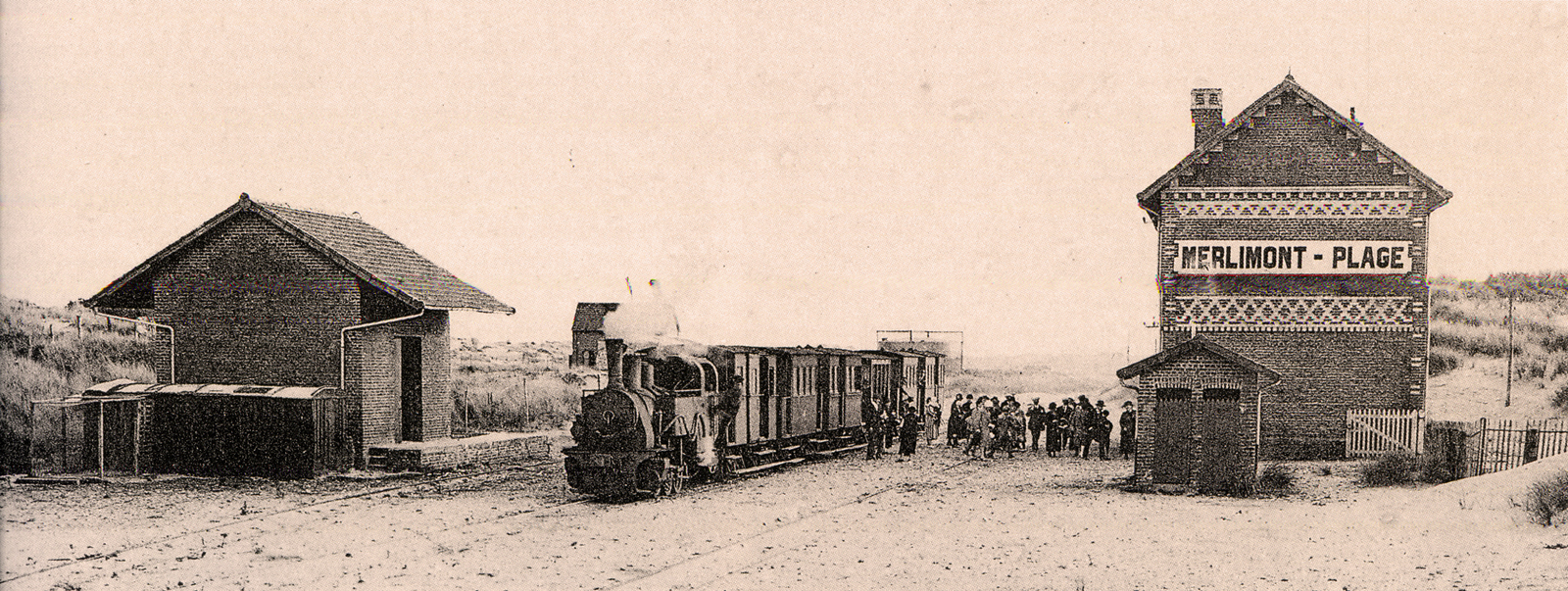
Merlimont dunes station

During World War II the sea front was disrupted by the installation of the Nazi Atlantic Wall. The town suffered from bombing during the Allied invasion in 1944. This contributed to the diminishing of the ancient fishing industry, which numbered some 150 boats at the turn of the century. It had all but disappeared by the 1960s.

Today, although the hospital sector remains economically important, the town has again promoted itself as a tourist attraction. A seaside bathing station, with an immense beach of fine sand on the Opal Coast, it continues to be a centre for sand yachting and the new sport of surfboarding. The former Berck Plage railway station has been converted into a casino.

The town has twinned with Bad Honnef in Germany and with Hythe in England.

== Fauna ==
The bay of Authie has a population of harbor seals, which can be seen at low tide from Berck.

== Buildings ==
The church of Saint Jean Baptiste was restored in 1954. The 15th-century carvings on its corbels were then highlighted in paint. The choir and belfry are listed monuments.

The new church of Notre-Dame des Sables was opened in 1886 on the marketplace of the beach quarter. Its seating for 1,500 was to cater principally to holiday makers in season and to the patients from the many medical establishments profiting from the sea air. There are paintings on the choir walls.

Beside its medical establishments, the beach quarter catered to the moneyed classes in the second half of the 19th century. It slowly developed with grandiose villas, hotels and amenities. Among these were handsome casinos, of which the principal was the Eden, also known as the Grand Casino de la Plage, with a theatre and music hall. This was destroyed in war in 1944, but it is survived by its equally gorgeous rival, the Kursaal. The ambitious Cottage des Dunes, which tried to unite a luxury hotel and casino, failed commercially in 1913. After a brief spell of use as a hospital, it was adapted for official use. Another official building that survived the bombing was the town hall, which was built in 1893 and has murals painted by Jan Lavezzari.

After the stone tower of St John the Baptist fell into disuse as a lighthouse, it was replaced at first by a primitive oil lamp suspended in the dunes to mark the sandbars at the river mouth. Two years later a 10-metre tower was mounted above a keeper's cottage. This became hidden by construction of the maritime hospital in 1861. A new, taller tower was constructed in 1868. The two buildings, referred to locally as father and son (le père et fils), stood next to each other until they were dynamited by the Germans in 1944. The current concrete lighthouse, designed by Georges Tourry, was completed in 1951 and is 45 metres high. Its light can be seen from a distance of 24 nautical miles (44 km).

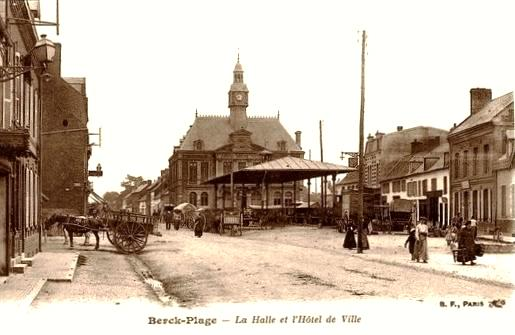
The town hall in 1900

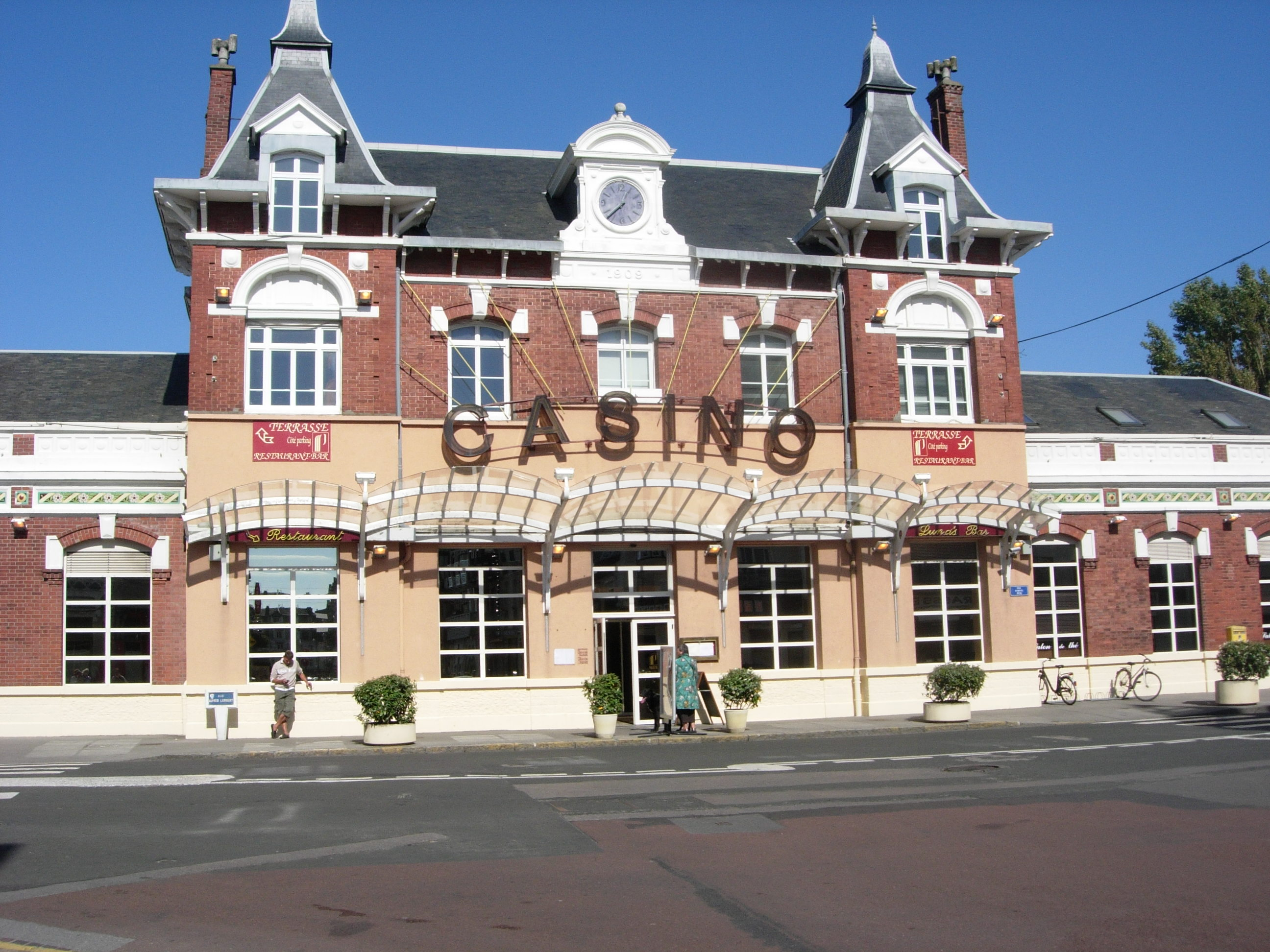
The station casino

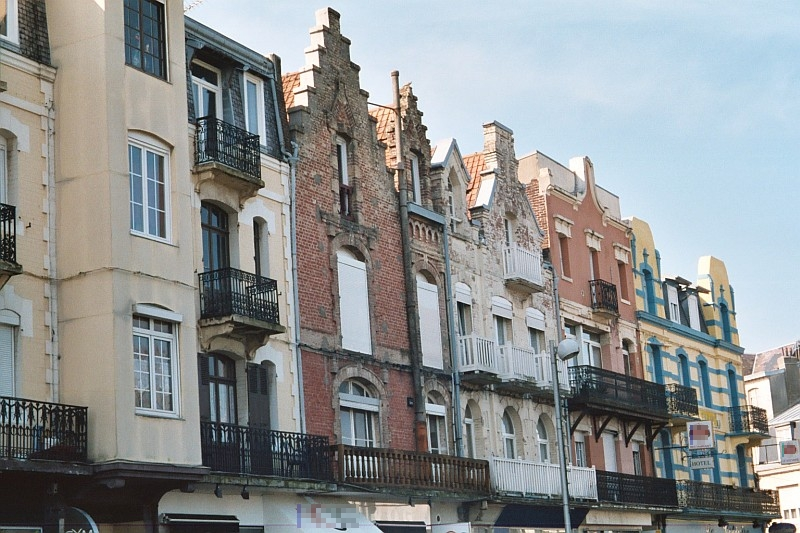
Architecture

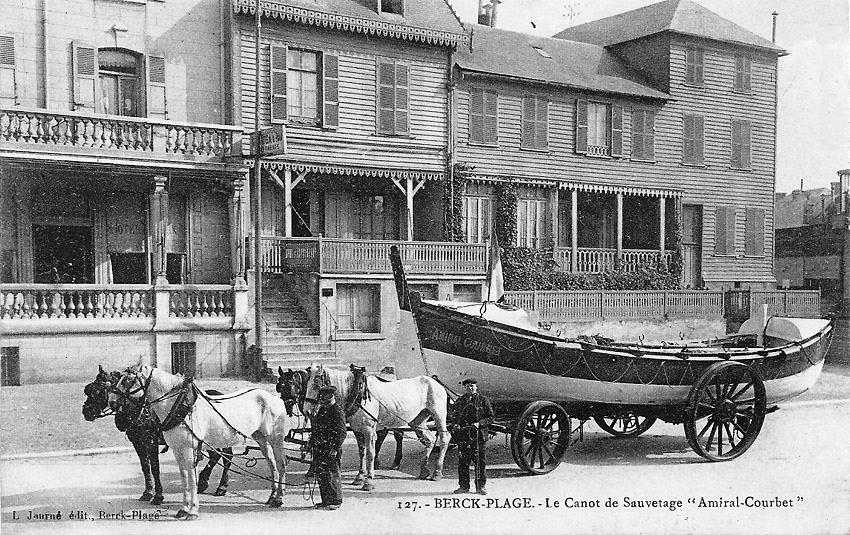
The lifeboat in front of holiday chalets about 1900

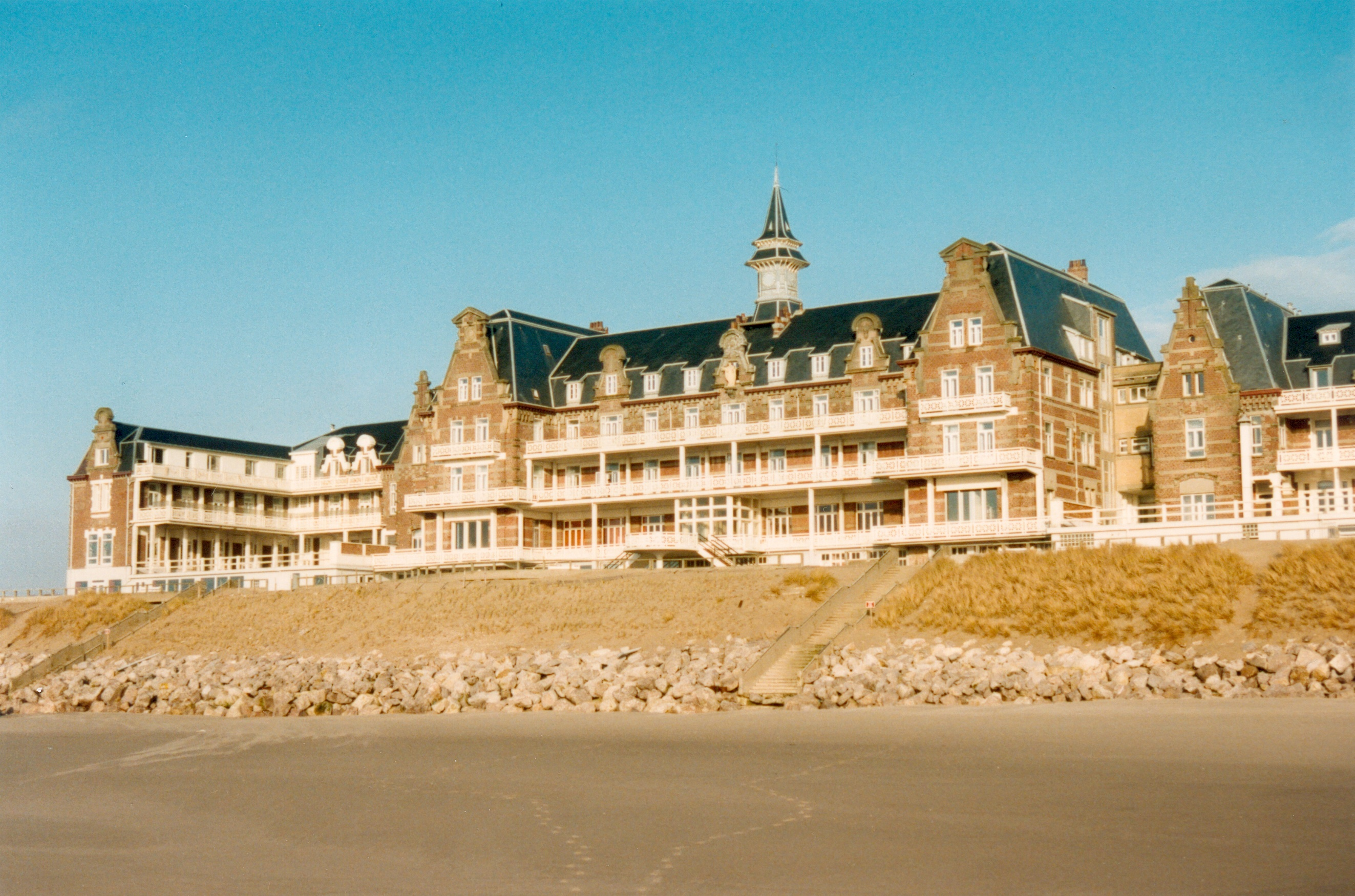
Institut Calot

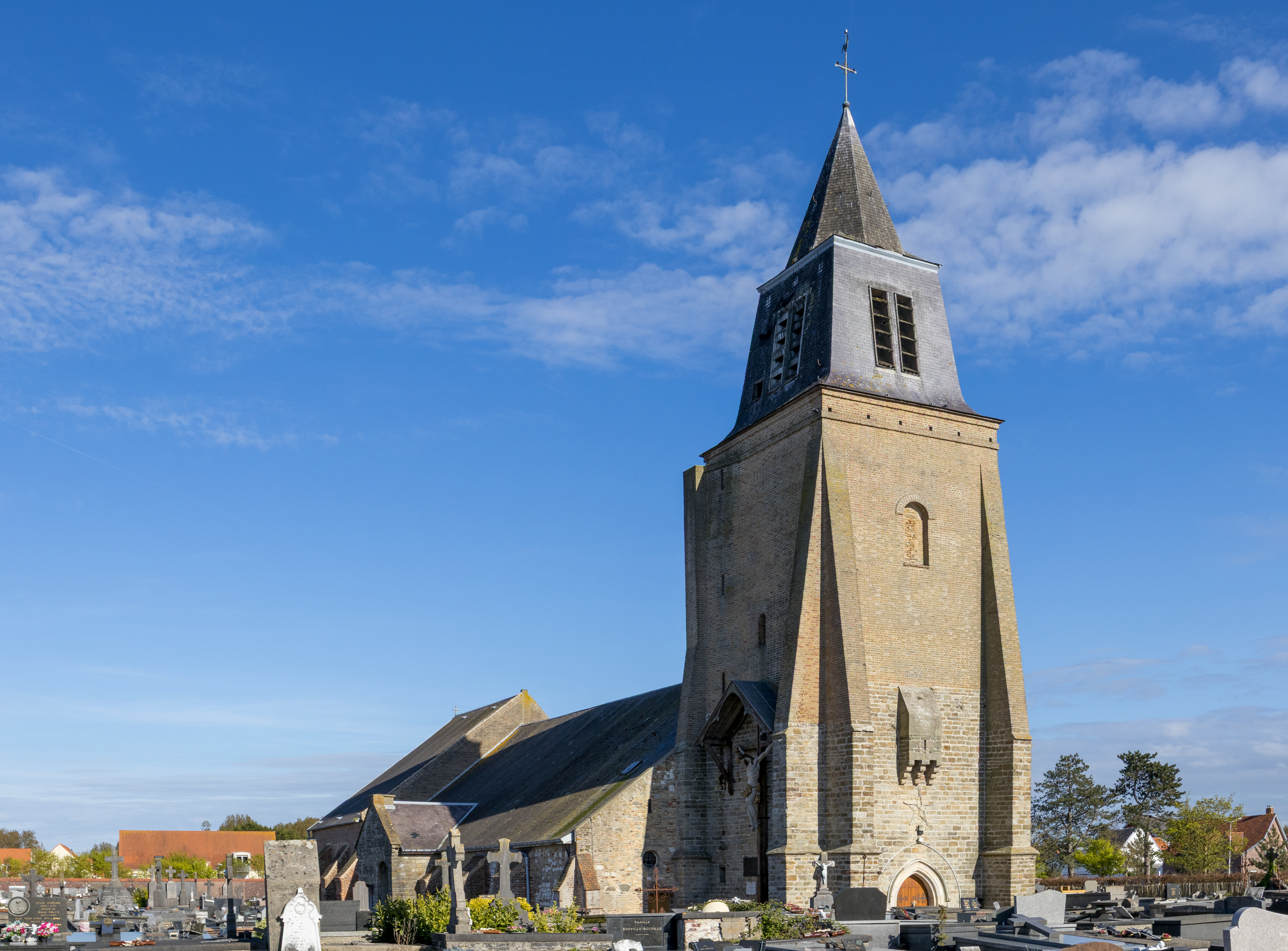
Church of St John the Baptist

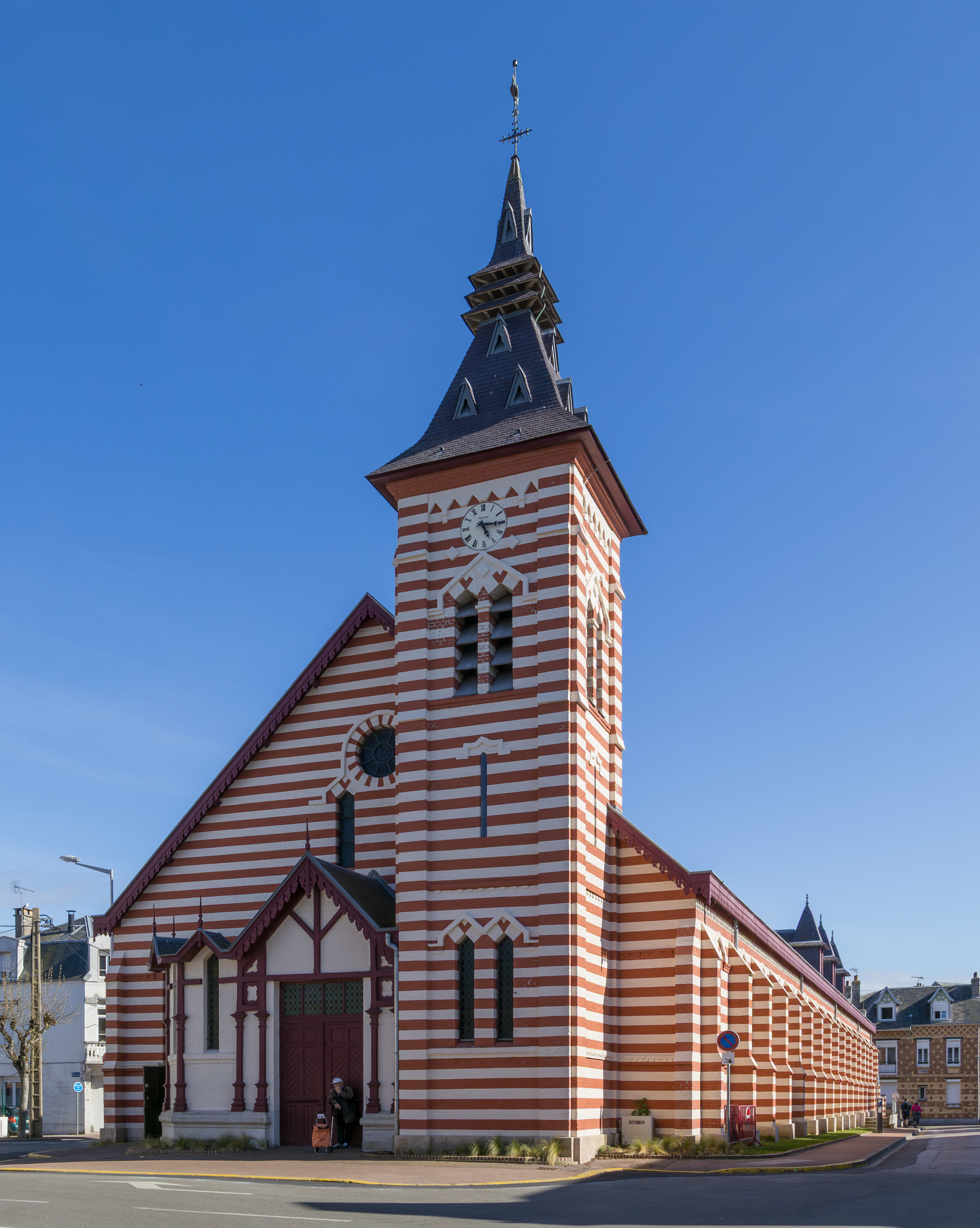
Parish Church of Our Lady of the Sands in Berck

== Aeronautical experiments ==
The steady sea breezes and the updraft created by the neighbouring dunes once made the town the centre of a number of aeronautical experiments. These began in the final decades of the 19th century with early trials of photography from unmanned kites. Among the first working locally was the English meteorologist E.D.Archibald in 1887; he was followed the next year by Arthur Batut and during 1889-91 by Emile Wenz. The experiments continued until 1914 and some of the photos found commercial use on postcards.

The town has had an aerodrome since 1917. This was in part because at the start of the 20th century, the area played its part in the race to take to the air. The artist Jan Lavezzari, who had originally studied engineering, tested a double lateen sail hang glider from the Merlimont sand dunes in February 1904. He was followed there that Easter by Gabriel Voisin, who made a trial flight in a glider plane modelled on that of the Wright Brothers and over a few seconds was airborne for 50 metres.

His one-time partner Louis Blériot never experimented with flight at Berck. He did develop and test the sand-yacht (l'aeroplage) there in 1911 and pioneered the first race over the sands in 1913.

Since 1966 a six-hour endurance race has been hosted by the local Eole Club. Since April 1987 there has been an international kite-flying festival every year on the sands.

== Population ==
Historical population

| Year | Pop. | ±% p.a. |
|---|---|---|
| 1793 | 984 | — |
| 1800 | 1,041 | +0.81% |
| 1806 | 1,212 | +2.57% |
| 1821 | 1,379 | +0.86% |
| 1831 | 1,649 | +1.80% |
| 1836 | 1,706 | +0.68% |
| 1841 | 1,842 | +1.55% |
| 1846 | 2,100 | +2.66% |
| 1851 | 2,216 | +1.08% |
| 1856 | 2,399 | +1.60% |
| 1861 | 2,703 | +2.41% |
| 1866 | 3,293 | +4.03% |
| 1872 | 4,228 | +4.25% |
| 1876 | 4,373 | +0.85% |
| 1881 | 4,590 | +0.97% |
| 1886 | 5,187 | +2.48% |
| 1891 | 5,752 | +2.09% |
| 1896 | 7,039 | +4.12% |
| 1901 | 7,799 | +2.07% |

| Year | Pop. | ±% p.a. |
|---|---|---|
| 1906 | 9,636 | +4.32% |
| 1911 | 11,597 | +3.77% |
| 1921 | 12,674 | +0.89% |
| 1926 | 13,980 | +1.98% |
| 1931 | 16,433 | +3.29% |
| 1936 | 16,700 | +0.32% |
| 1946 | 11,529 | −3.64% |
| 1954 | 14,285 | +2.72% |
| 1962 | 12,877 | −1.29% |
| 1968 | 13,690 | +1.03% |
| 1975 | 14,420 | +0.74% |
| 1982 | 14,060 | −0.36% |
| 1990 | 14,167 | +0.09% |
| 1999 | 14,378 | +0.16% |
| 2007 | 15,341 | +0.81% |
| 2012 | 14,725 | −0.82% |
| 2017 | 14,189 | −0.74% |
| 2023 | 12,951 | −1.51% |

Source: EHESS and INSEE (1968–2023)

The inhabitants are called Berckois in French. Over the past two centuries there has been a steady growth in the population of the town, which in the 1793 census was 983, only a little more than the 800 recorded in 1301. In 1851 this had more than doubled to 2,216 and after the commercial development during the second half of that century had climbed to 7,799 by 1901. It more than doubled again by 1936 (16,700) but fell to 11,529 by 1946. After a peak in 2007, it has decreased to 12,951 in 2023.

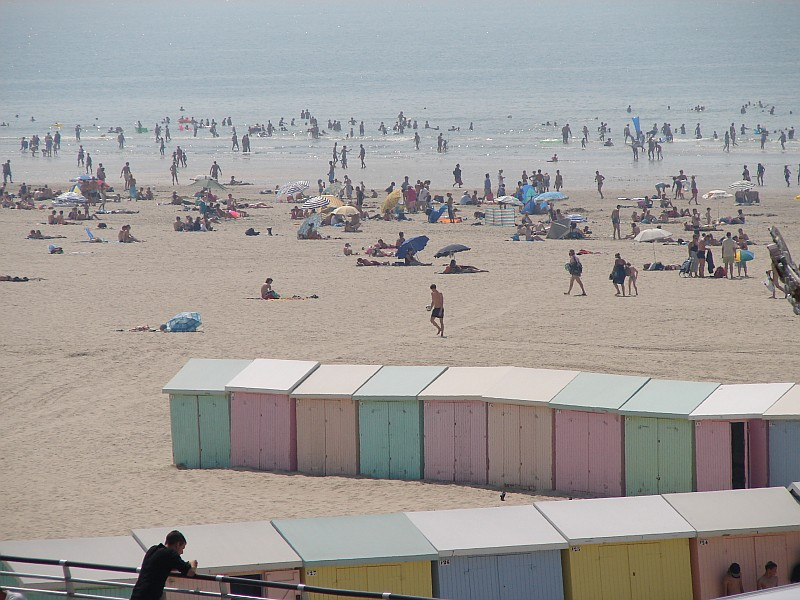
Berck – The sea front

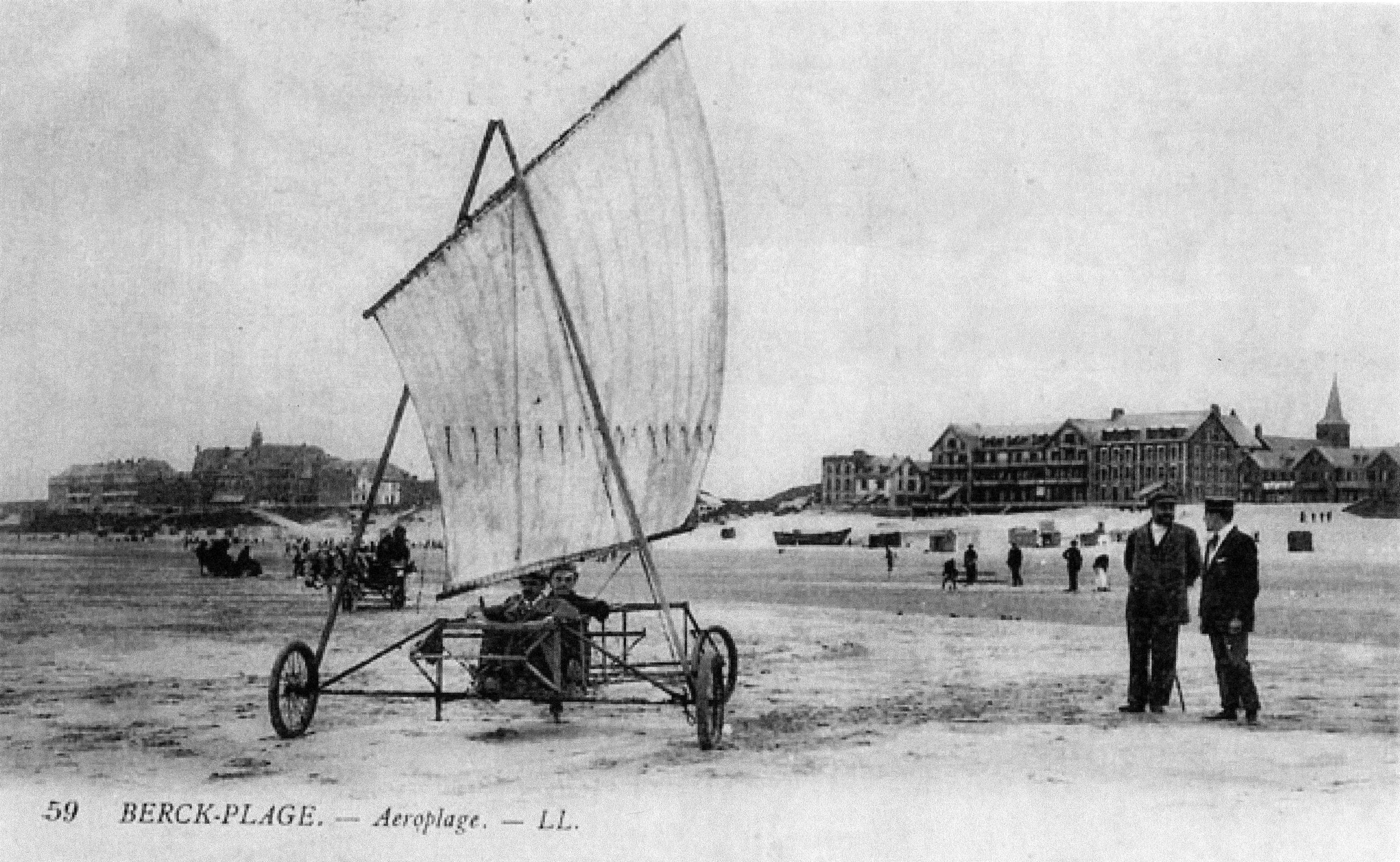
A sand-yacht on the beach in 1913

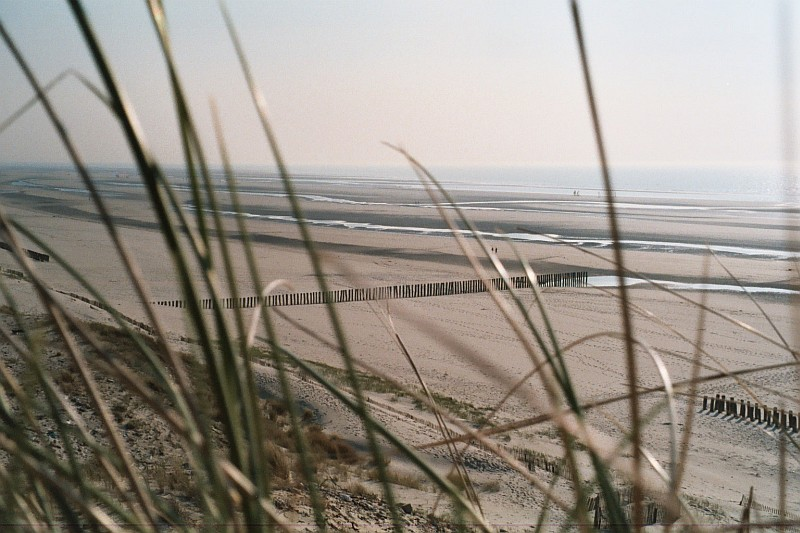
The sands

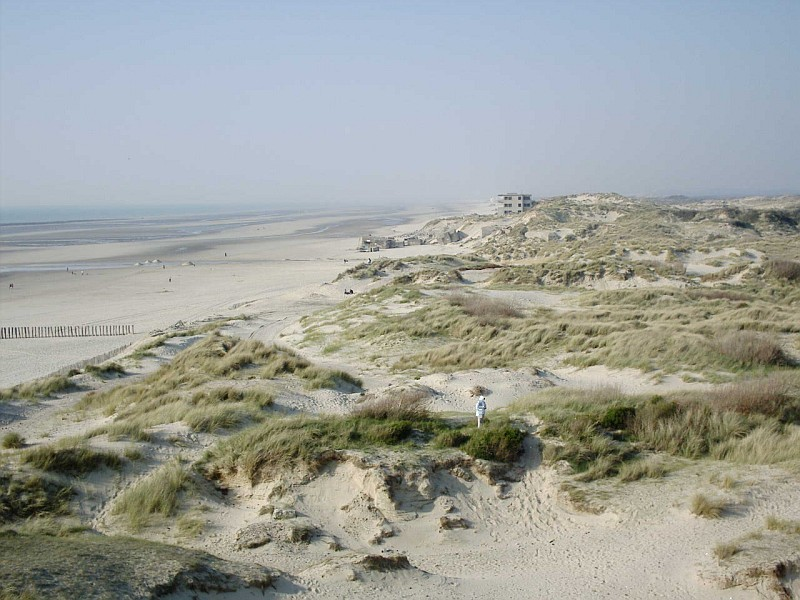
The dunes

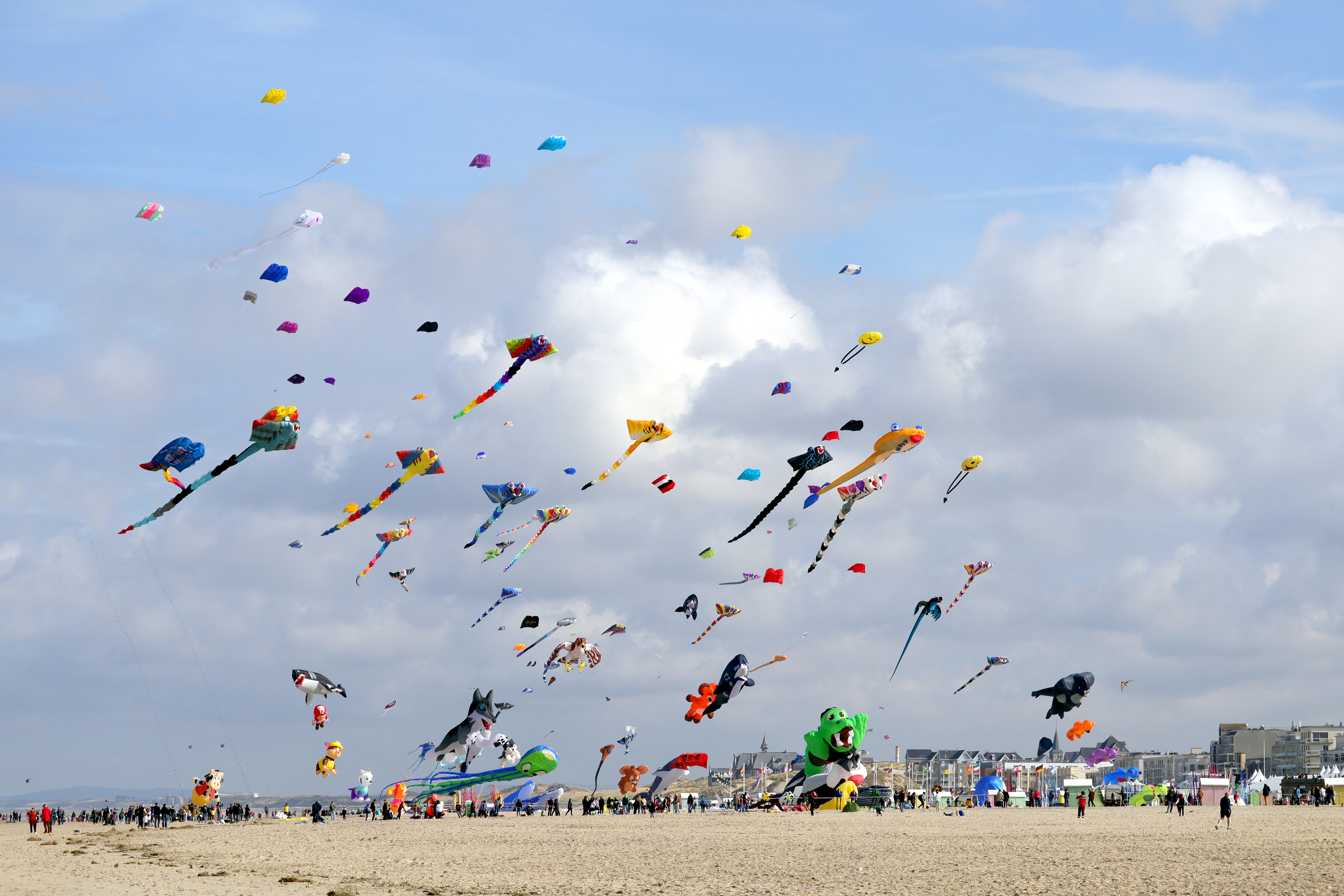
International Kite Festival

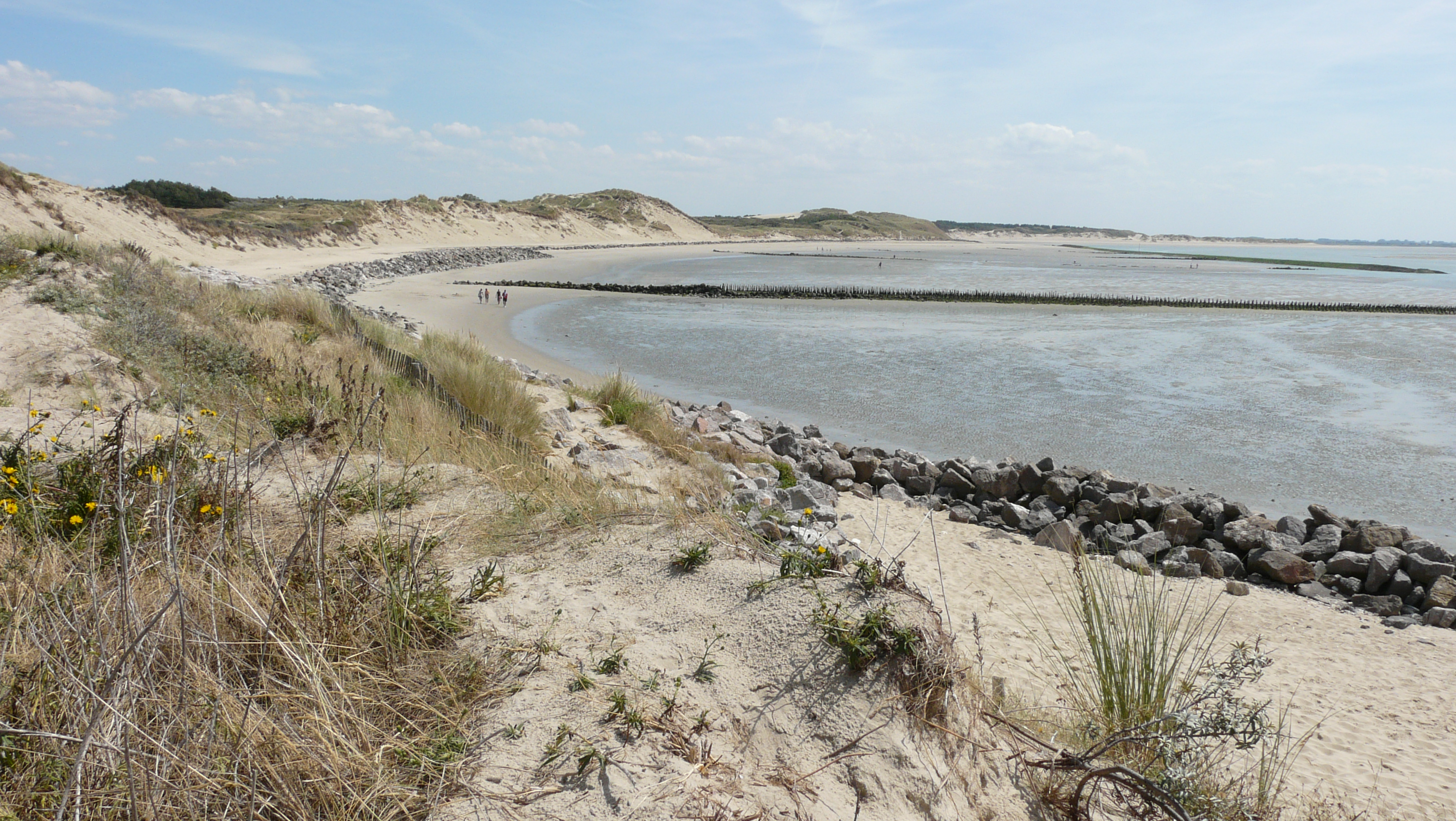
The dunes of " Baie d'Authie"

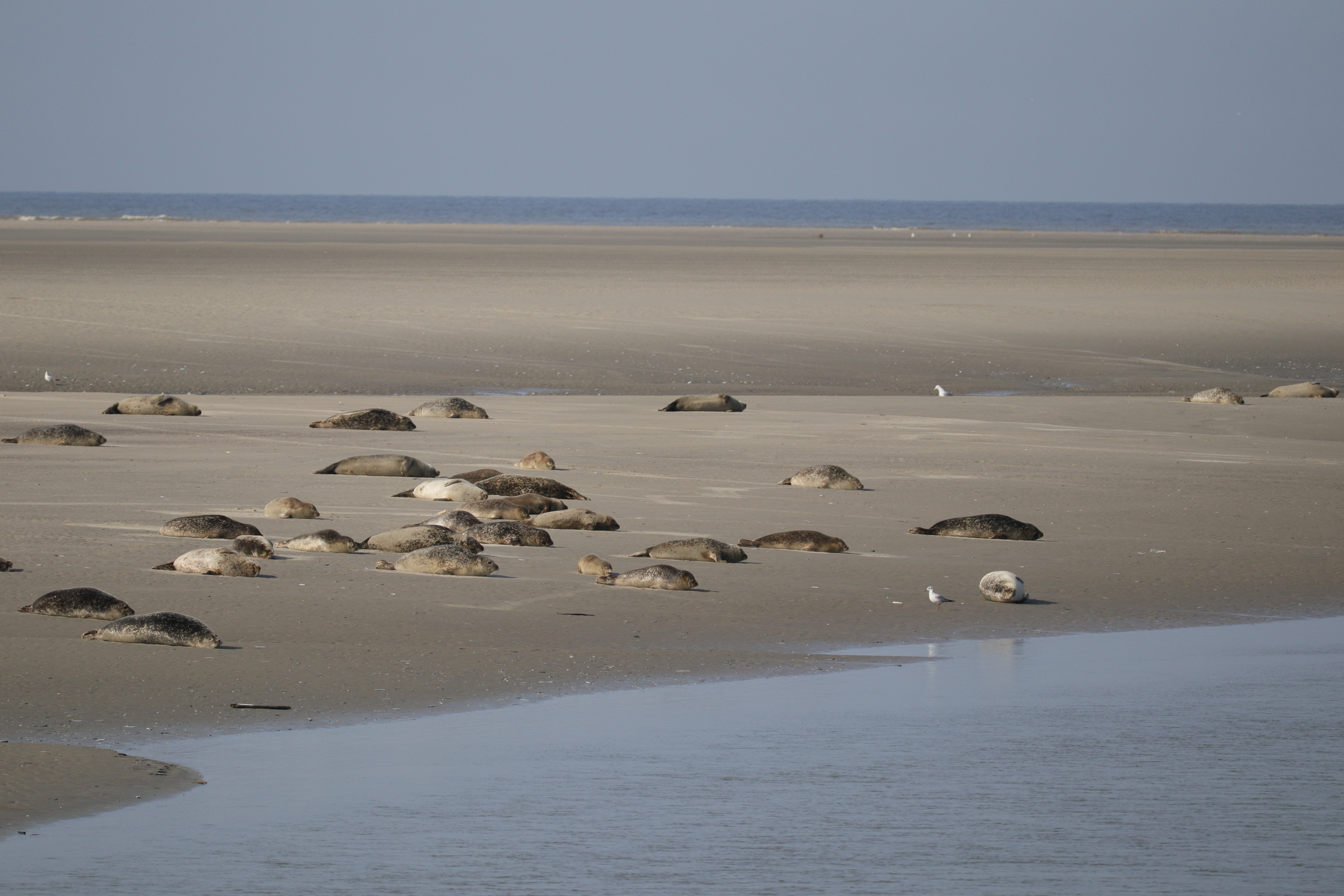
Seals on the sands

== The 'Berck School' of painters ==
Painters joined the 19th century Parisian visitors to the town and passed on news of their discovery to fellow artists in the capital. One of the most notable was Édouard Manet, who passed a summer there with his family in 1873. Among the twenty paintings he made were depictions of boats at sea and the beachscape; some are now held by the Musée d'Orsay. Eugène Boudin first visited in 1874; over the next twenty years, he made Berck the subject of some 120 paintings. He was followed in 1876 by Ludovic-Napoléon Lepic, who was so taken with the place that he set up a studio there. Until 1885 he devoted some six months of the year there, painting the area and the lives of fishermen.

Following in their footsteps came the sons of local families who, until about 1914, constituted what has been called 'the Berck School'. These included Francis Tattegrain, who was encouraged to take up art by Lepic; Jan Lavezzari, son of the town architect who was also a friend of Lepic; Charles Roussel (1861–1936), who settled in the town in 1886; and Eugène Trigoulet (1864–1910).

After World War I the town and its inhabitants continued to be represented artistically by Roussel and by Louis Montaigu (1905–1988). Fishermen in interiors were a specialty of the latter.

A collection of these and other Opal Coast painters was opened in 1979 in the Municipal Museum, sited in Berck's old Gendarmerie. This was built at the end of the 19th century by Emile Lavezzari.

== Berck in the arts ==
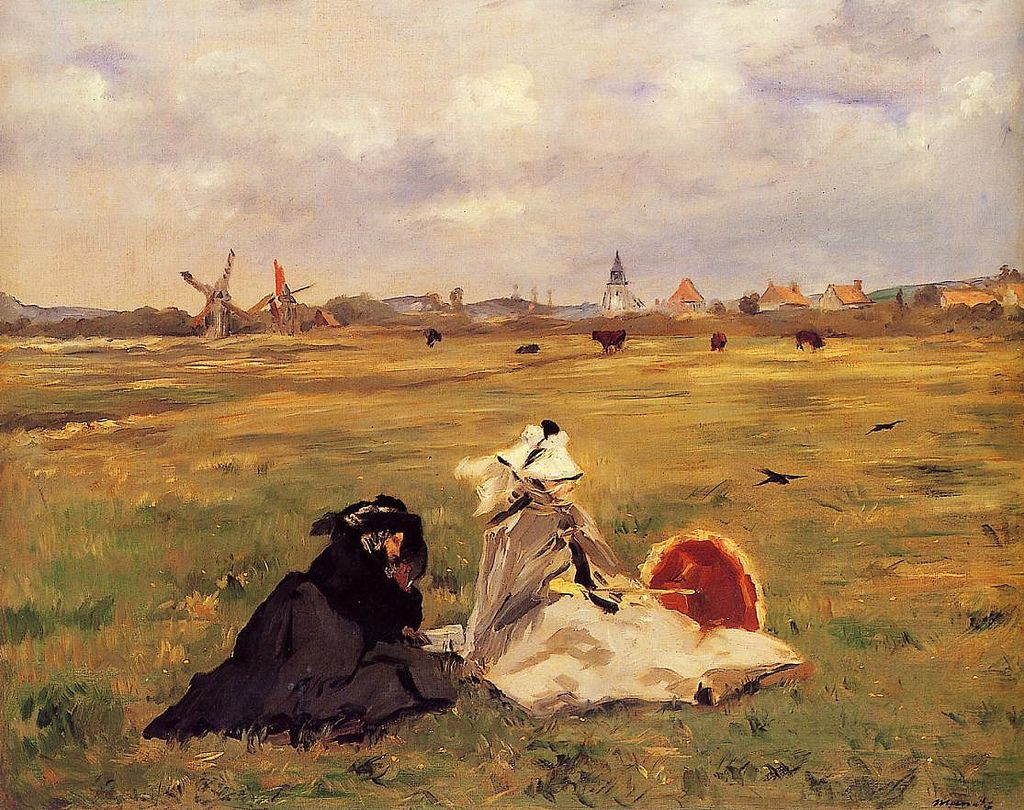
Édouard Manet, The Swallows (Berck meadows). 1873, E.G. Bührle Collection, Zürich

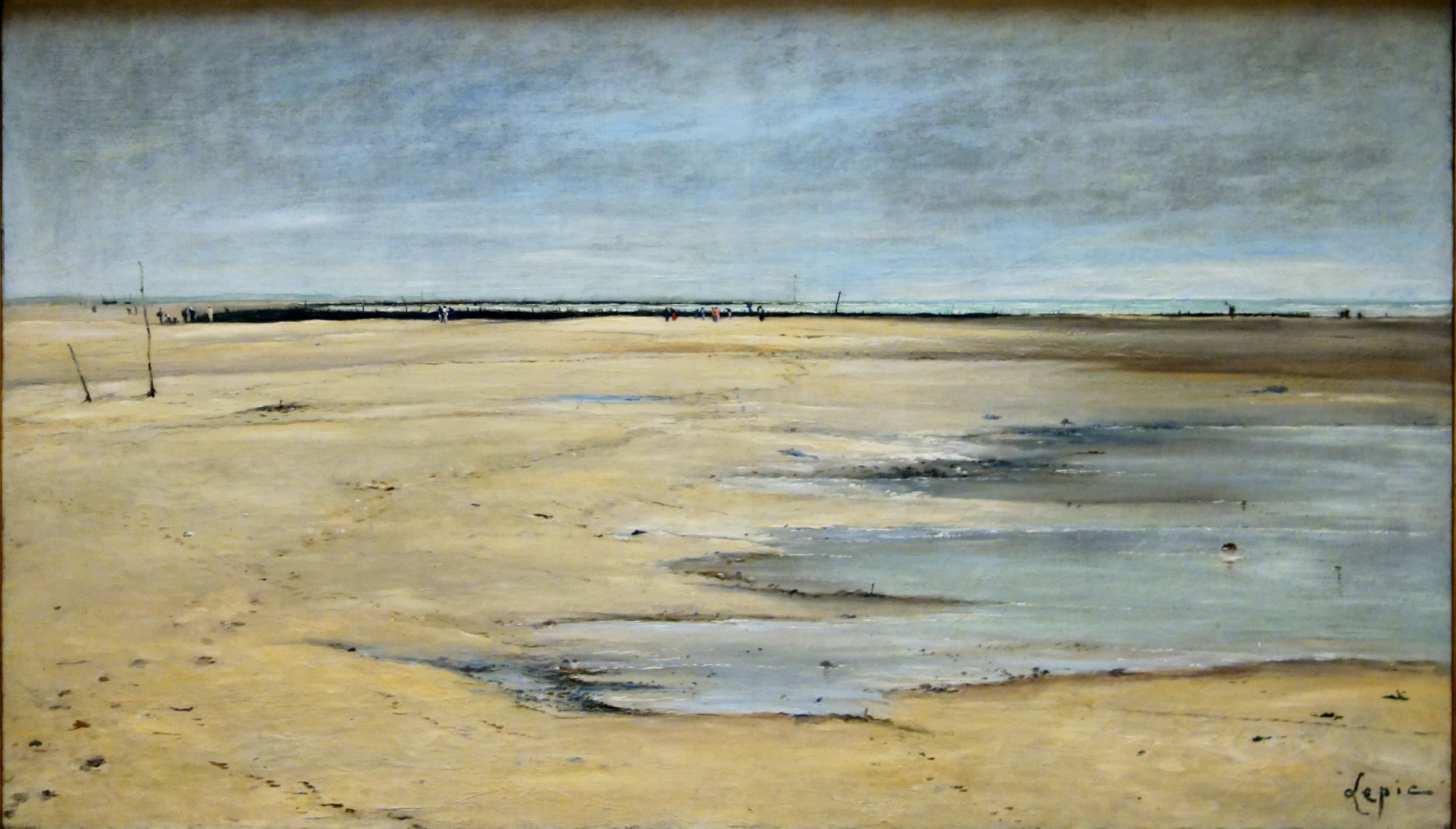
Ludovic-Napoléon Lepic, The beach at Berck. 1876, Palais des beaux-arts de Lille

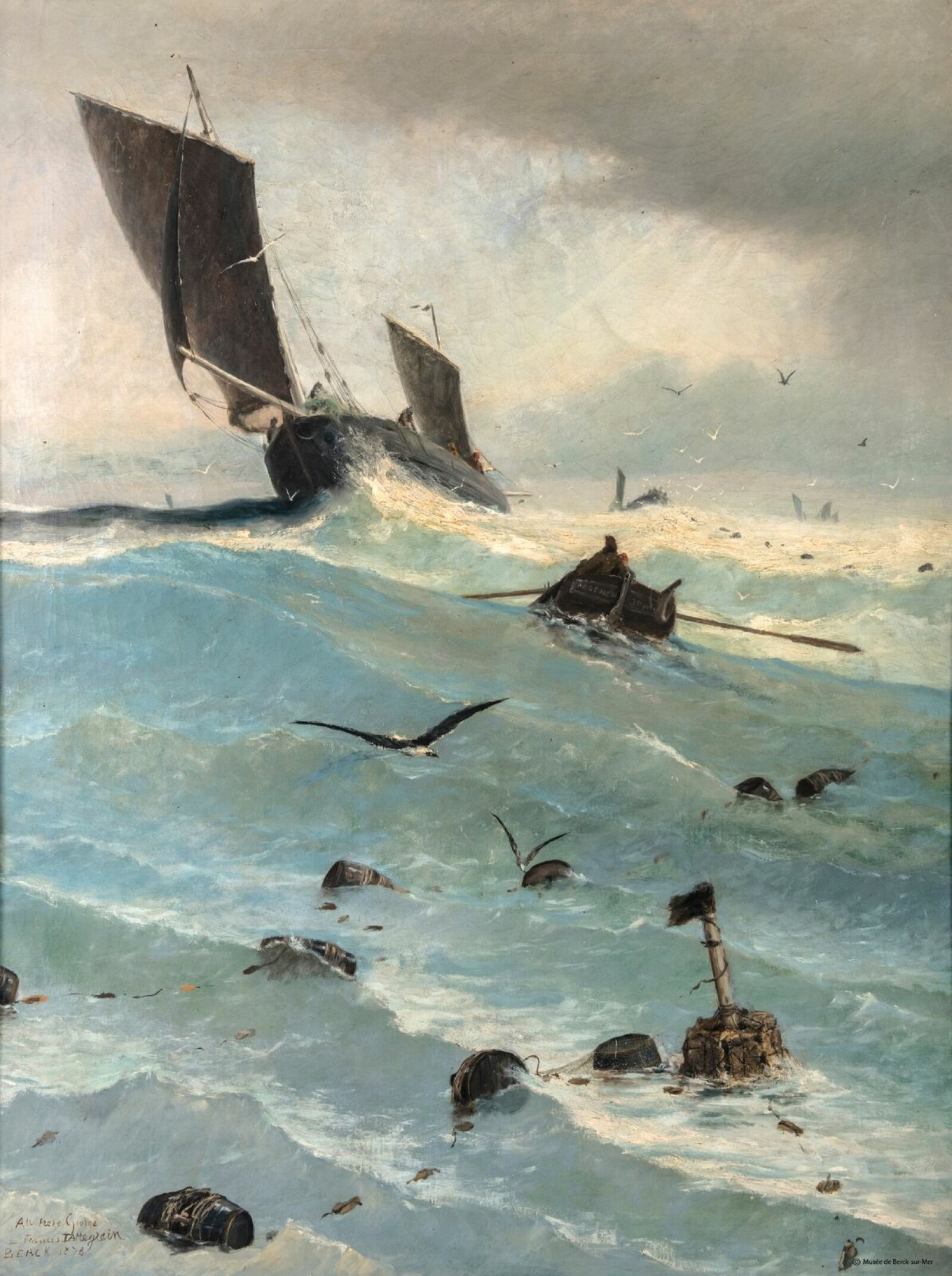
Francis Tattegrain, Fishing boats off Berck. 1878, Musée de Berck sur Mer

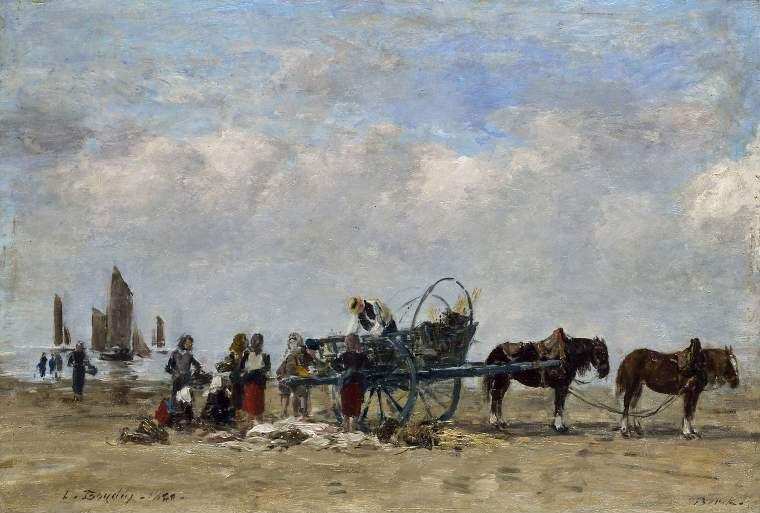
Eugène Boudin, The fish-cart. 1880, Fitzwilliam Museum, Cambridge

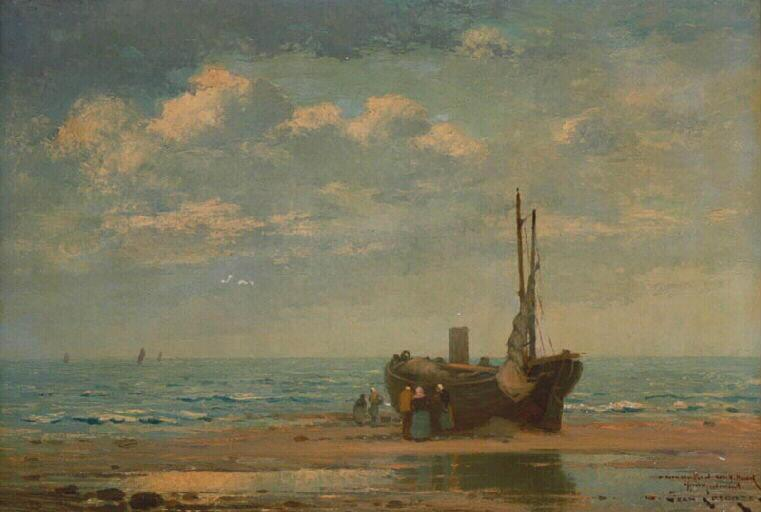
Jean Laronze, Berck foreshore. 1904, Musée des Ursulines, Mâcon

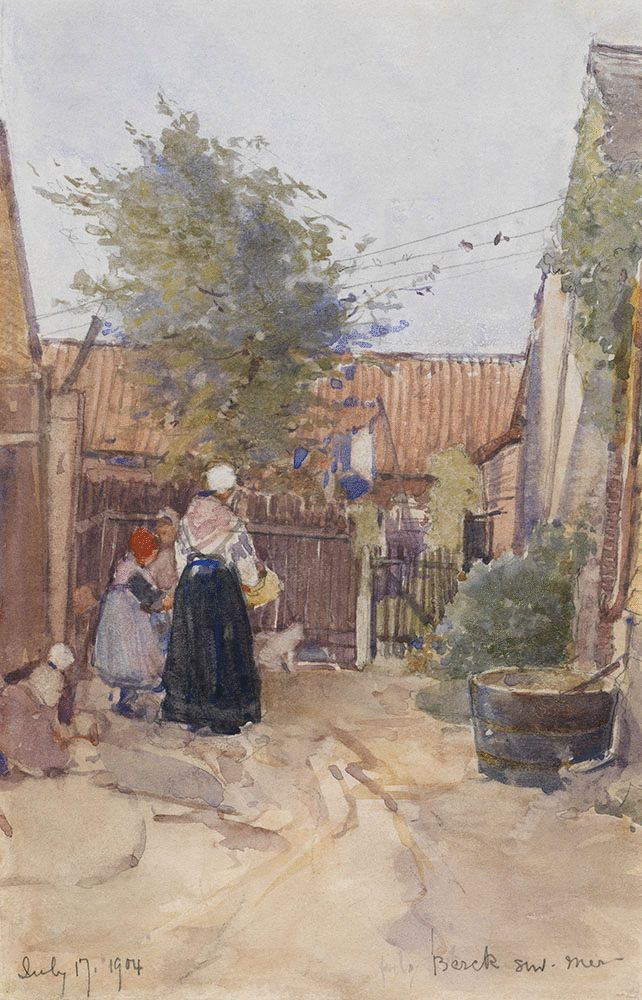
Patty Townsend-Johnson, Berck back garden. Watercolour, 1904

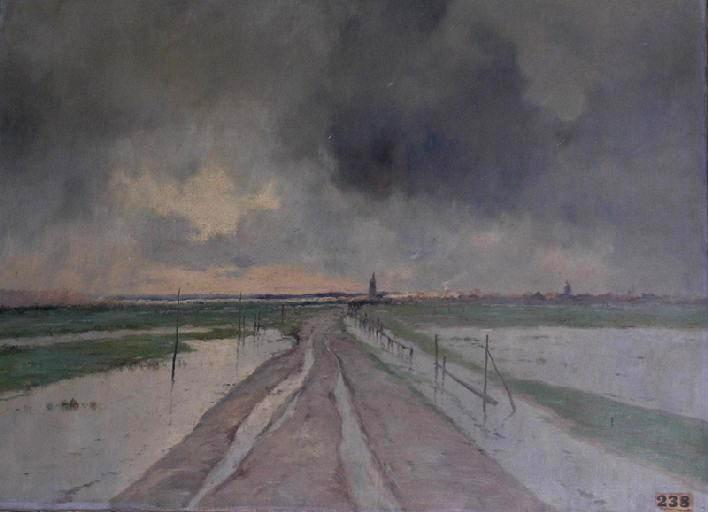
Marie-Joseph Iwill, The flooded road to Berck. 1909, Musée des Beaux-Arts, Rouen

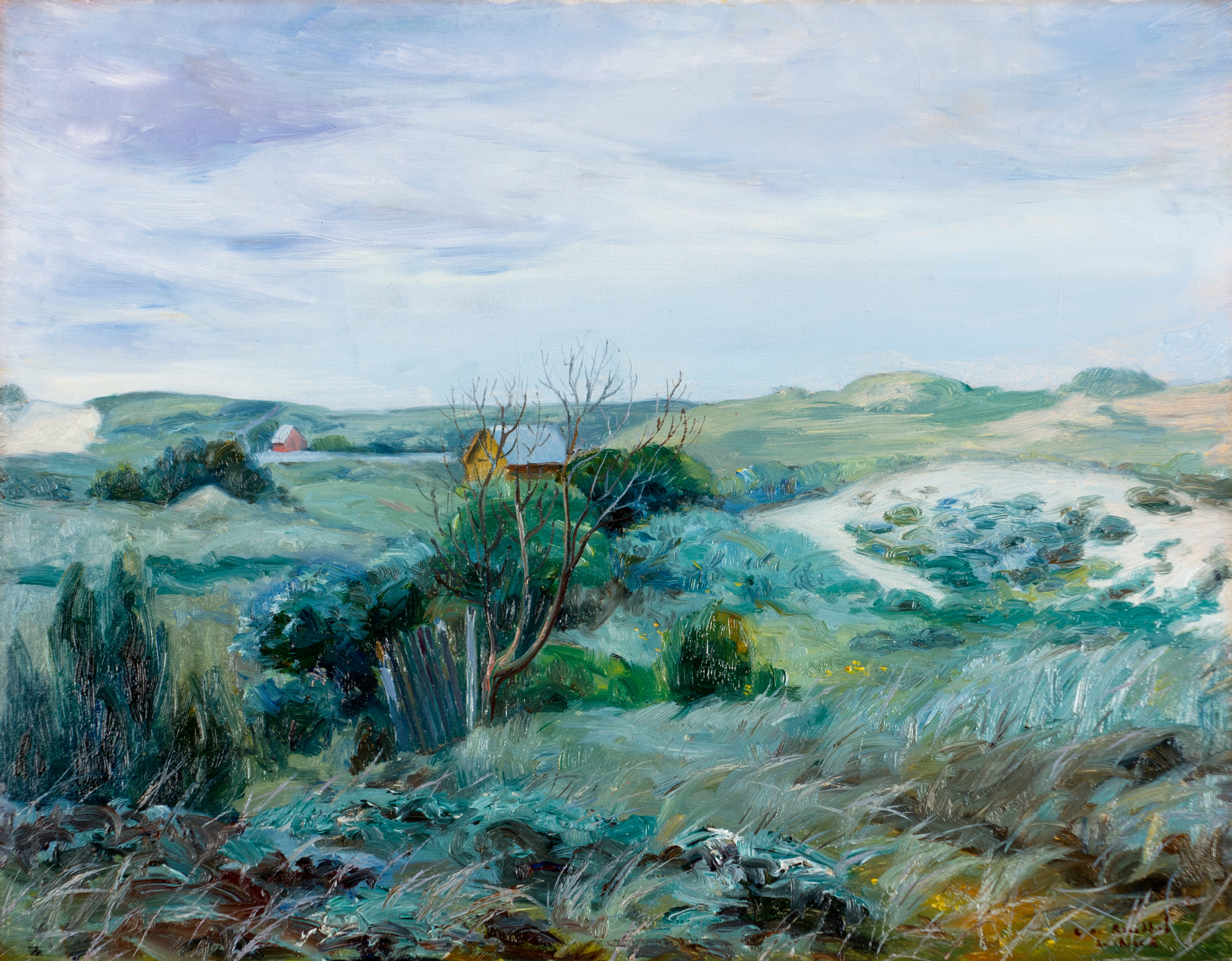
Charles Roussel, Dune on the outskirts of Berck. Oil on wood, 1920

Among minor artists who have made Berck a subject in their work are Paul Laugée (1853–1937); Eugène Chigot (1860–1923), who had a studio there in 1893; and Georges Maroniez, a judge who painted and photographed in the area during holidays. Two others stayed in the town because of its medical facilities. Albert Besnard was there in 1895 on account of his tubercular son. As a thanks offering for his cure, Besnard and his wife Charlotte decorated the walls of the chapel in the Cazin-Perrochaud Institute between the years 1898–1901. While he was there, he also executed oil paintings and etchings. Jean Laronze (see above) was also there in 1904 for the same reason and painted several canvases during his stay.

The town figures unfavourably in the long poem "Berck-Plage" by Sylvia Plath. She had visited it in 1961 and wrote the poem a year later, mixing memories of maimed war veterans at the Berck hospital with impressions of the recent death and funeral of a neighbour.

In Jean-Paul Sartre's Le Sursis (The Reprieve), the character of Charles is evacuated from the military hospital at Berck just before the outbreak of the Second World War. The town also figured in the novel Une année à Berck by Christian Morel de Sarcus (Paris, 1997).

== Language ==
The language originally spoken by the inhabitants was Picard, from which originated several expressions used by fishermen. Although it has now retreated before standard French, there are still those who seek to preserve it. Berck has a language association, T'yn souvyin tu? and there have been linguistic studies of the local dialect. These include the poet Edouard Grandel's Lexique du patois berckois (Université de Picardie, Amiens, 1980), Lucien Tétu's Glossaire du parler de Berck (Société de linguistique picarde, 1981) and his À l'écoute des Berckois : Dictons et proverbes, sobriquets (Société de linguistique picarde, 1988). The Picard dialect poet Ivar Ch'Vavar was born in the town in 1951 and, though he now lives in Amiens, has often written about it, most notably in Berck (un poème), published in 1997.

== Personalities ==
- Annette Messager, conceptual artist.
- Jean-Dominique Bauby, author of the French best seller Le scaphandre et le papillon, the film adaptation of which was also shot in the town.

== See also ==
- Communes of Pas-de-Calais
