= Jean Laronze =

French painter (1852–1937)

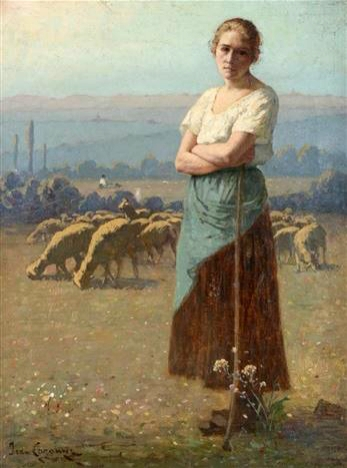
Shepherdess in a Summer Landscape

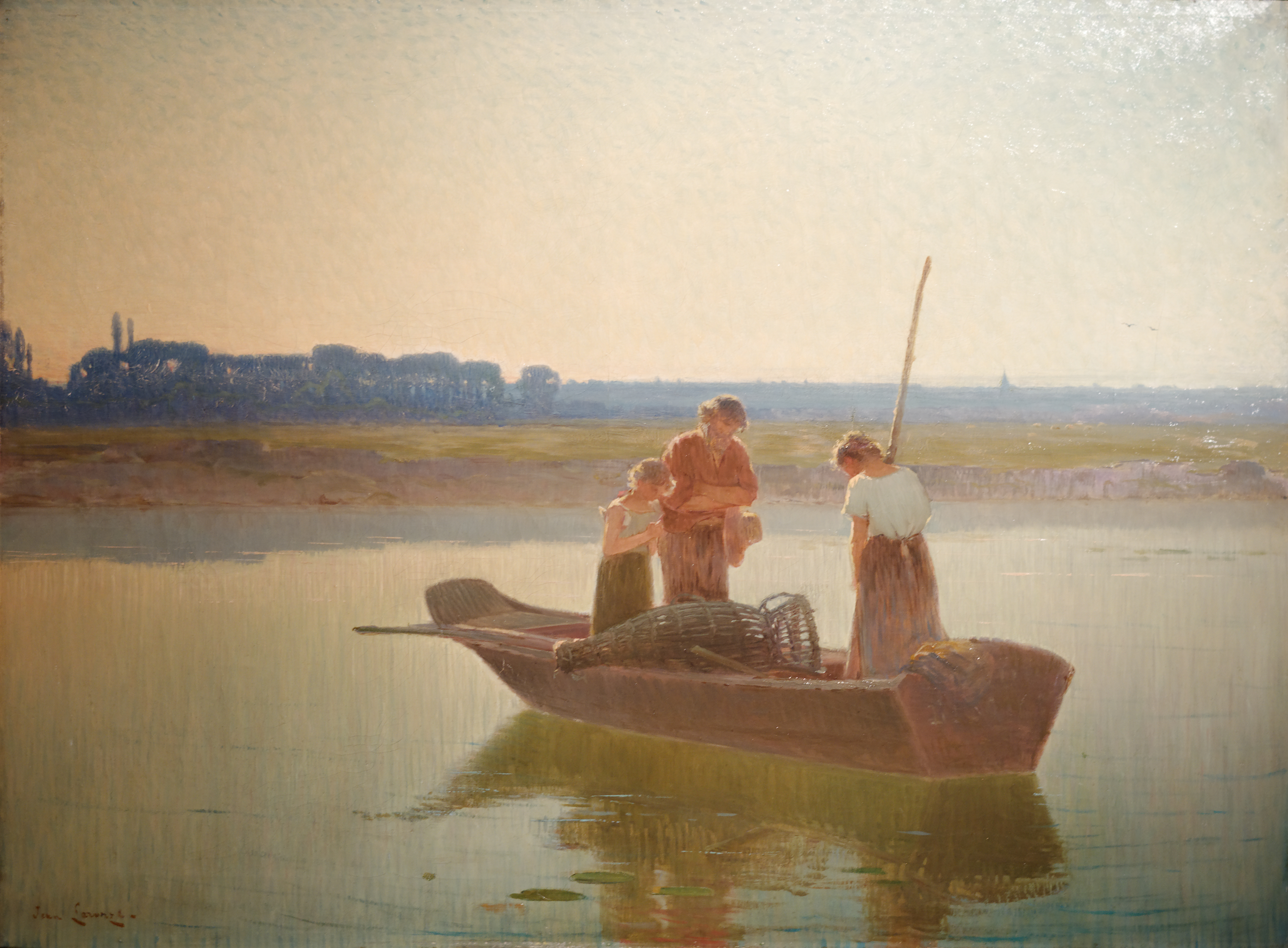
The Angelus

Jean Laronze (25 November 1852, Génelard – 12 February 1937, Neuilly-sur-Seine) was a French painter of rural scenes and landscapes.

== Biography ==
He became interested in art following a visit to the Musée Rolin in Autun. The following year (1859), he began his schooling at the Lycée Lamartine in Mâcon, where his drawing teacher, Eugène Chambellan (1821–1901), was impressed by his enthusiasm and encouraged him to pursue his interest. He left the Lycée in 1872, without having received his diploma, and enlisted in the Army. When he had completed his service, Chambellan advised him to take classes at the École des Beaux-Arts de Paris. This was opposed by his father, who wanted him to take over the family river transport business.

He honored his father's wishes until 1878, when he married Eugénie Mignot, the daughter of a wealthy merchant. In 1882 they moved to Paris, where his in-laws were more than happy to support his artistic aspirations. His first teacher there was the landscape painter, Émile Dardoize (1826–1901). Initially, his works were very simple and plain, inspired by Neo-Classicism. Later, he came under the influence of the Barbizon School; adding figures to his landscapes. Next, he studied at the Académie Julian with Tony Robert-Fleury and William Bouguereau, where he was the oldest student in the workshop. His first exhibit at the Salon came in 1883.

In 1890, both of his daughters died from meningitis. His father-in-law died soon after. The mourning process curtailed his work for almost two years. It took his friend and former teacher, Bouguereau, to re-motivate him by inviting him into the "Association des Artistes, Peintres, Sculpteurs, Architectes, Graveurs et Dessinateurs", of which Bouguereau had been president since 1883. In 1896, he began exhibiting again. During the 1900s several of his works were purchased by the government. In 1906, he was named a Knight in the Legion of Honor.

He stopped painting during World War I; choosing instead to write patriotic pieces and help tend to the wounded. His son, who had barely survived the meningitis in 1890, was killed in 1918. He resumed his normal activities in 1919. During the next decade, he began selling his paintings abroad for the first time.

In 1930, the town of Charolles proposed opening a "Jean Laroze Museum". He donated around twenty of his own paintings, as well as several by other painters that he had acquired over the years. The museum was inaugurated at the Town Hall in 1933. He died four years later at his home in Neuilly-sur-Seine.
