= Harbor Freight Tools =

US tool and equipment retailer

- Type: Private
- Industry: Retail
- Founded: 1977; 49 years ago Los Angeles, California, U.S.
- Founders: Eric Smidt and Allan Smidt
- Headquarters: Calabasas, California, U.S.
- Number of locations: 1,600+
- Area served: United States
- Key people: Eric Smidt (Owner and CEO) and Allan Mutchnik (President)
- Products: Tools
- Revenue: ▲$9 billion (2026)
- Number of employees: 30,000
- Website: www.harborfreight.com

Harbor Freight Tools, commonly referred to as Harbor Freight, is an American privately held tool and equipment retailer, headquartered in Calabasas, California. It operates a chain of retail stores, as well as an e-commerce business. The company employs over 30,000 people in the United States, and has over 1,600 locations in 48 states.

== History ==
In 1977, Eric Smidt and his father, Allan Smidt, started Harbor Freight Salvage in a small building in North Hollywood, California. The company began as a mail-order tool business that dealt in liquidated and returned merchandise. As the business grew, its name was changed to Harbor Freight Tools. In 1985, Eric Smidt was named president of the company at age 25; he served under that title until 1999, when he became chief executive officer. From the mid-1980s to 2010 Harbor Freight was headquartered in nearby Camarillo, California.

== Retail stores ==
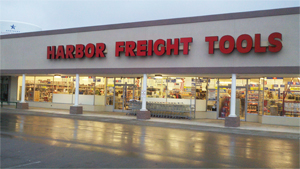
First Harbor Freight Tools retail store, located in Lexington, Kentucky

In 1982, Harbor Freight Tools opened its first retail store in Lexington, Kentucky, to sell returned merchandise from its mail order business. The original location was at 1387 East New Circle Road. It later moved to 1301 Winchester Road, Suite 213. The venture proved successful, and Harbor Freight Tools began to open stores across the United States. As of 2024, Harbor Freight Tools operates over 1,600 retail stores in 48 states.

== House brands ==
Harbor Freight sells many tools, accessories, and numerous other types of products under its house brands, sourced directly from manufacturers. These include:

- Apache
- Ames
- Armstrong
- Atlas
- Avanti
- Badland
- Bauer
- Berger
- Black Widow
- Braun
- Bunker Hill
- Cen-Tech
- Central Machinery
- Chicago Electric
- Cover-Pro
- Daytona
- Doyle
- Drill Master
- Drummond
- Earthquake
- Fasten-Pro
- Fortress
- Gordon
- Grant's
- Greenwood
- Hardy
- Haul-Master
- Hercules
- HFT
- ICON
- Luminar
- Maddox
- McGraw
- Merlin
- Niagara
- One Stop Gardens
- Pittsburgh
- Predator
- Portland
- Quinn
- Roadshock
- Spectrum
- Storehouse
- Thunderbolt
- Titanium
- U.S. General
- Vanguard
- Vulcan
- Warrior
- Yukon

== Website ==
Harbor Freight's website went online in 1997. It had a modest catalog of products, a brief "About Us" section and an order form for the printed catalog. There were also links to a customer service page with delivery times and return policies. In all, the original site had 10 landing pages. The current Harbor Freight website has over 79,000 indexed pages. The Harbor Freight website had over 31 million monthly visits as of 2023, mostly within the United States, according to Similarweb.

== Corporate affairs ==
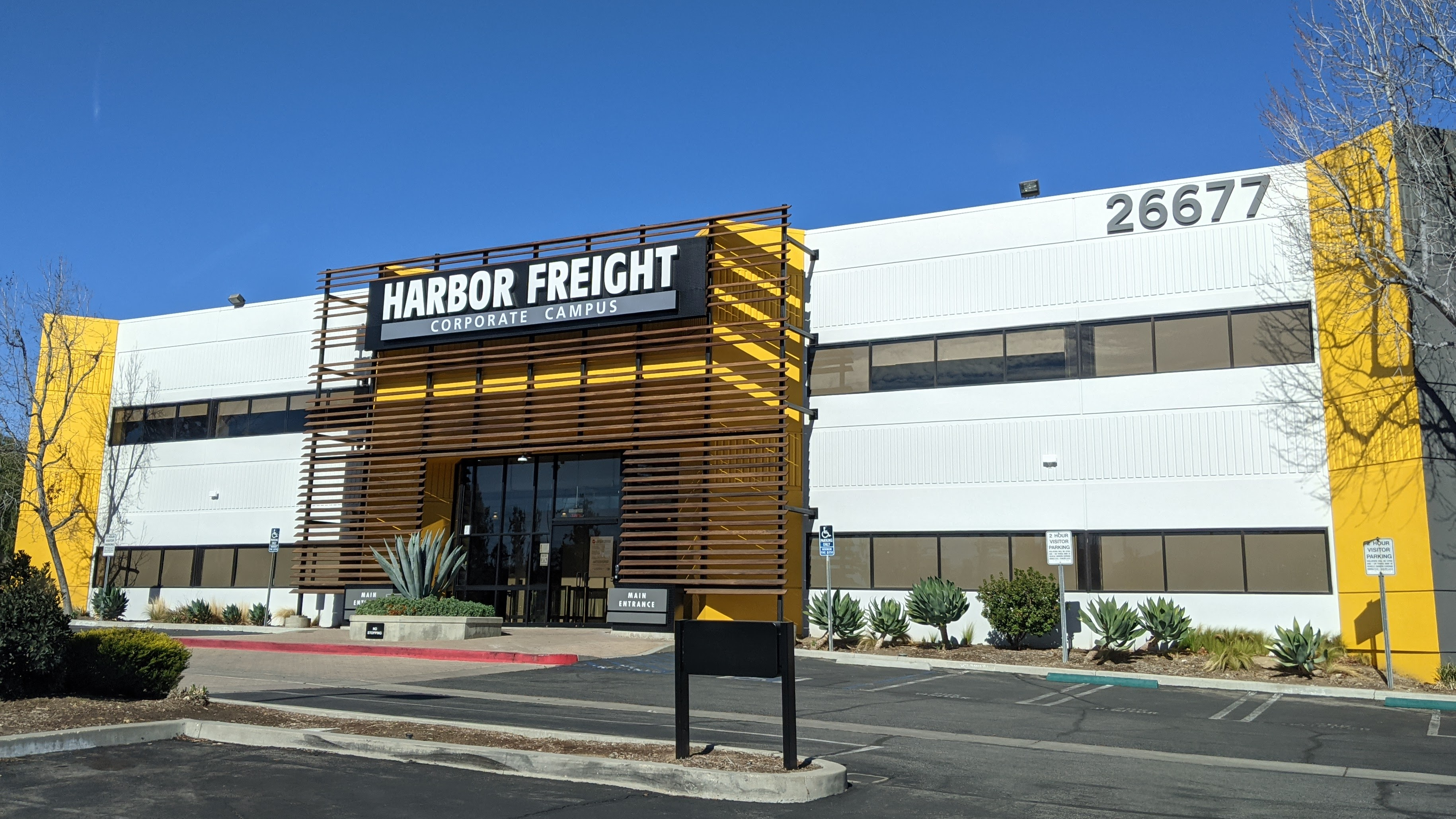
Harbor Freight Tools Corporate Headquarters in Calabasas, California

Harbor Freight Tools is headquartered in Calabasas, California. Harbor Freight has distribution space in Camarillo, California; Moreno Valley, California; Dillon, South Carolina; Joliet, Illinois; Fort Worth, Texas; and Frederickson, Washington. It closed a distribution facility in Oxnard, California, in early 2013.

On 4 April 2013, Harbor Freight Tools announced a $75 million expansion project for the Dillon distribution center, which opened on November 22, 2015, adding 1 million square feet to the facility and 200 new jobs.

In 2022, Harbor Freight Tools opened a distribution center in Joliet, Illinois, spanning 1.6 million square feet in size and creating 800 new jobs.

In 2023, 2024, and 2025, Harbor Freight Tools was certified as a Great Place to Work. According to the Great Place to Work Institute, 90% of employees at Harbor Freight Tools say it is a great place to work compared to 57% of employees at a typical U.S.-based company.

== Investor relations ==
In 2012, Harbor Freight, through Credit Suisse, secured a $750 million loan to refinance existing debt and fund a dividend for the company's private shareholders.

== Philanthropy ==
Harbor Freight Tools states "one of our core values is giving back to the great communities where we live, work and serve. With respect and humility, we strive to support and strengthen communities, big and small, across the United States." The company supports K-12 skilled trades education, veterans, and police and fire organizations with donations and gifts of tools and equipment.

On January 9, 2013, CEO Eric Smidt, through Harbor Freight Tools, donated $1.4 million of tools and equipment to the Los Angeles Unified School District's (LAUSD) Career Technical Education.

In 2016, Eric Smidt formed The Smidt Foundation to house Harbor Freight Tools for Schools and support other education, health, safety, and community needs. The Harbor Freight Tools for Schools Prize for Teaching Excellence awards more than $1.5 million annually to skilled trades teachers and their schools, and in total, has awarded over $10 million to date.

In March 2020, in response to the COVID-19 pandemic, Harbor Freight Tools committed to donate its entire supply of N95 masks, face shields, and nitrile gloves to U.S. hospitals which had a 24-hour emergency room.

== Criticism and legal action ==
Harbor Freight Tools was sued by a group of its store employees in 2012, who alleged that they were misclassified as "exempt" from overtime payments as "managers" under the Fair Labor Standards Act. Harbor Freight Tools won a decertification of the class action; that is, the court found that all the individual situations were not similar enough to be judged as a single class, and that their claims would require an individual-by-individual inquiry, so the case could not be handled on a class basis.

In 2015, a class action lawsuit was filed against the company by customers, claiming that the tool company falsely advertised "normal" prices for products that were higher than an advertised "sale" price, when the item had never been offered at the original, higher price. Consumers claimed that this practice misled them into thinking that the item was on sale and they were getting a deal. The company settled, paying consumers up to $33,000,000.
