= Eric Ledell Smith =

American historian

Eric Ledell Smith (1949 – 2008) was an American historian and author. He served as Commissioner for the Pennsylvania Historical and Museum Commission. He was part of a presentation on Frederick Douglass aired on C-SPAN.

Smith was born in Detroit, Michigan. He was inspired by his grandmother, poet Florence Brown. At the time of his death he was working on the Trailblazers: Innovative African Americans in Pennsylvania History project writing profiles of historical figures.

He has written about Pennsylvania and African American history including books on Bert Williams, Black Opera, African American theaters, the State Museum of Pennsylvania, civil rights movement in Pennsylvania, and an article on the Chester Race Riot.

== Writings ==
- Bert Williams : a biography of the pioneer Black comedian McFarland & Company, Jefferson, North Carolina (1992) ISBN 9780899506951
- Blacks in opera : an encyclopedia of people and companies, 1873-1993 McFarland (1994) ISBN 9780899508139
- The protégé becomes a prophet : Meta Vaux Warrick Fuller Pennsylvania heritage (1974). Vol. 22, no. 2 (spring 1996)
- African Americans in Pennsylvania; Shifting Historical Perspectives, edited with Joe W. Trotter, Penn State University Press (1997) ISBN 9780892710591
- "Researching the Underground Railroad in Dauphin County, Pennsylvania" (2000)
- "Painted with pride in the U.S.A." PHMC, Harrisburg, Pennsylvania (2001)
- African American theater buildings : an illustrated historical directory, 1900-1955 McFarland (2003) ISBN 9781476604664
- The State Museum of Pennsylvania : a centennial history, 1905-2005 (2005)
- "The civil rights movement in Pennsylvania" Pennsylvania Historical and Museum Commission (2006)
- "The 1917 Race Riot in Chester, Pennsylvania". Pennsylvania History: A Journal of Mid-Atlantic Studies. 75 (2): 297–341 (2008)
