= National Coalition for Homeless Veterans =

U.S. nonprofit organization

The National Coalition for Homeless Veterans (NCHV) is an American 501(c)(3) nonprofit organization governed by a 17-member board of directors is a resource and technical assistance center for some community-based service providers and local, state and federal agencies that provide emergency and supportive housing, food, health services, job training and placement assistance, legal aid and case management support for homeless veterans.

NCHV also serves as a liaison between care providers, the U.S. Congress and the executive branch agencies.

Under a technical assistance grant awarded by the U.S. Department of Labor, NCHV provides guidance and information about program development, administration, governance and funding to all of the nation's homeless veteran service providers.

== VA's Plan to end veteran homelessness in five years ==
On Nov. 3, 2009, at the "VA National Summit Ending Homelessness among Veterans," then-Secretary of Veterans Affairs Eric Shinseki unveiled his department's comprehensive plan to end homelessness among veterans, stating:

Many of you have been working the issue of veteran homelessness for a long time – as members of the Interagency Council on Homelessness or the National Coalition for Homeless Veterans or the Advisory Committee on Homeless Veterans. ... I'm the newcomer here today, so let me reiterate that this is not a summit on homeless veterans – it's a summit to end homelessness among veterans. That's our purpose. President Obama and I are personally committed to ending homelessness among veterans within the next five years.

Upon the summit's conclusion, NCHV published a detailed account of Shinseki's address and the proposed five-year plan, titled "VA Summit Frames Plan to End Veteran Homelessness." On August 5, 2011, the U.S. Department of Labor announced 23 grants totaling $5,436,148 to provide homeless veterans with job training aimed at helping them succeed in civilian careers. The grants are being awarded by the department's Veterans' Employment and Training Service through the Homeless Veterans Reintegration Program. The grants announced in August 2011, are the first of a possible four years of annual awards contingent upon satisfactory performance and congressional appropriations.
