= Eric Smidt =

American billionaire businessman

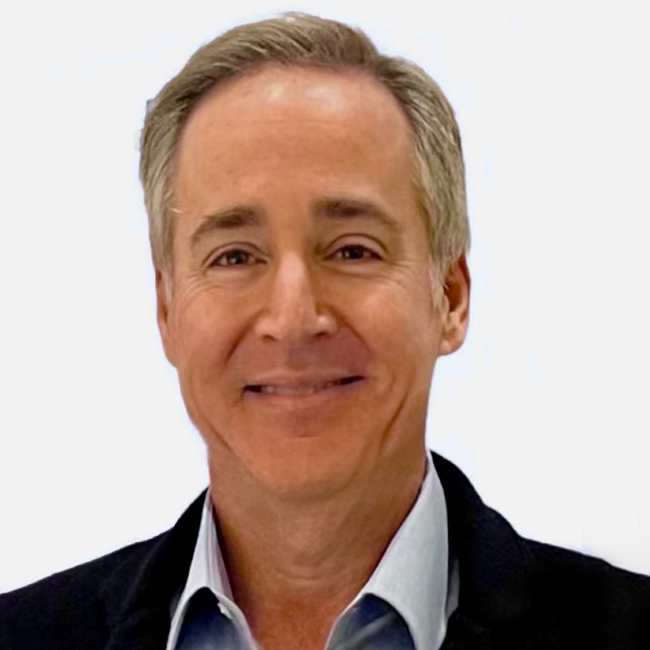
- Born: 1960 (age 65–66); Los Angeles, California, US
- Occupations: Chairman & CEO of Harbor Freight Tools; Founder and President, The Smidt Foundation
- Spouse: Susan Smidt
- Children: 2

Eric L. Smidt is an American businessman. He is the chairman and CEO of Harbor Freight Tools, a tool retailer with more than 1,600 stores across 48 states and annual revenue of $9 billion as of 2026.

== Early life ==
Eric was born in Los Angeles, California to Allan Smidt and Dorothy Smidt. His mother had multiple sclerosis and his father, overwhelmed, sent him to an orphanage when he was nine. Four years later, he went to live with an aunt in Tennessee, returning home after two years, before moving into his own apartment on his 16th birthday. He graduated from Grant High School in Van Nuys, a public school in Los Angeles.

In 1977, Eric and his father, Allan Smidt, started Harbor Freight Salvage in a small building in North Hollywood, California. The company began as a mail order tool business that dealt with liquidated and returned merchandise. As the business grew, its name was changed to Harbor Freight Tools. Eric introduced the company's defining innovation, which was cutting out the middleman, and began to send tools directly from the factories to the customer.

== Tenure as chairman and CEO ==
In 1985, Eric Smidt was named president at age 25; he served under that title until 1999, when he became CEO. In 2001, he was listed as one of Ernst & Young's Entrepreneurs of the year.

In 2008, Smidt responded to the turbulence in the global economy by implementing a company-wide reinvigoration plan. The program led to new products and lower prices.

== Philanthropy ==
Smidt is the founder and president of The Smidt Foundation. With assets of approximately $265 million, the foundation's signature program, Harbor Freight Tools for Schools, supports skilled trades education in U.S. public high schools.

A long-time supporter of Los Angeles-area charitable organizations, Smidt in 2012 funded a new public high school in Los Angeles known as "Smidt Tech" (also known as Alliance Susan & Eric Smidt Technology High) for Alliance College-Ready Public Schools (an independent non-profit charter school manager).

In January 2013, Smidt directed Harbor Freight Tools to donate $1.4 million in tools and equipment to the Los Angeles Unified School District's (LAUSD) Career Technical Education program after learning that its annual budget was cut to one-quarter of what it was two years earlier. He named this program "Tools for Schools." He observed that "for far too long vocational education has not been given the attention and funding it deserves," and added that, "at a time when a well-trained workforce is essential to compete in the global economy, the United States too often falls short."

In August 2013, Smidt expanded the Tools for Schools program by donating a $100,000 gift of tools and equipment to vocational schools in and around Dillon County, South Carolina. Harbor Freight Tools for Schools awards $1.5 million to skilled trades teachers and their schools annually. To date, over $10 million has been awarded to more than 180 teachers and their programs. In 2026, the annual prize amount increased to $2 million.

Marking the opening of the 500th Harbor Freight Tools store near Chicago, Smidt announced the contribution of $100,000 and the donation of tools to Chicago Public Schools to support teachers and students in skilled trades learning and internships.

In 2015, Harbor Freight Tools established a program to fund requests from non-profit organizations in the U.S. to support veterans, police and fire departments, and K-12 skilled trades education.

In 2016, the National Coalition for Homeless Veterans honored Harbor Freight Tools with its Outstanding Corporate Partner Award in recognition of the company's support for homeless veterans.

To help fund disaster relief efforts across the country, The Smidt Foundation makes an annual $500,000 donation to the American Red Cross.

Smidt reportedly contributed $350,000 to support Mayor Eric Garcetti's effort to help Los Angeles secure the 2024 Olympic Games.

On February 14, 2018, Eric and Susan Smidt, along with The Smidt Foundation, made a $50 million gift to Cedars-Sinai Medical Center to establish the Smidt Heart Institute. This gift, the largest single donation then received by Cedars-Sinai, was earmarked to fund cardiovascular disease and cardiology research efforts. "It's important to support outstanding local institutions, and we want to help amplify Cedars-Sinai's impact on human health and wellbeing here and far beyond Los Angeles. We are humbled to play a role in their long tradition of savings lives and serving our community," said Eric Smidt in a press release.

On March 22, 2020, Smidt directed Harbor Freight to donate its entire supply of N95 masks, Face shields, and 5/7 mil Nitrile gloves to hospitals with a 24-hour emergency room.

In June 2022, Eric & Susan Smidt donated $5 million to the Holocaust Museum LA, which will allow the museum to double its campus in Pan Pacific Park.

As of 2025, The Smidt Foundation has given more than $10 million to teachers and their programs through the Harbor Freight Tools for Schools Prize for Teaching Excellence.

== Personal life ==
Smidt is a collector of modern art and serves on the board of the Los Angeles County Museum of Art.

Smidt is a prominent Los Angeles Democrat who has hosted fundraiser dinners for both Bill and Hillary Clinton. He is a friend of former Mayor of Los Angeles Antonio Villaraigosa, and he helped pay down the Mayor's ethics fines. On March 4, 2013, LA Weekly reported that Smidt donated $50,000 to the Coalition for School Reform to elect Kate Anderson and Antonio Sanchez to the LAUSD Board of Education and to re-elect incumbent Monica Garcia. He contributed $114,300 to Democratic campaigns in 2012.

In 2010, Smidt was sued by his parents for "looting" Harbor Freight Tools. In 2022, Smidt purchased a $350-million megayacht called Infinity.
